= Sofia Carson discography =

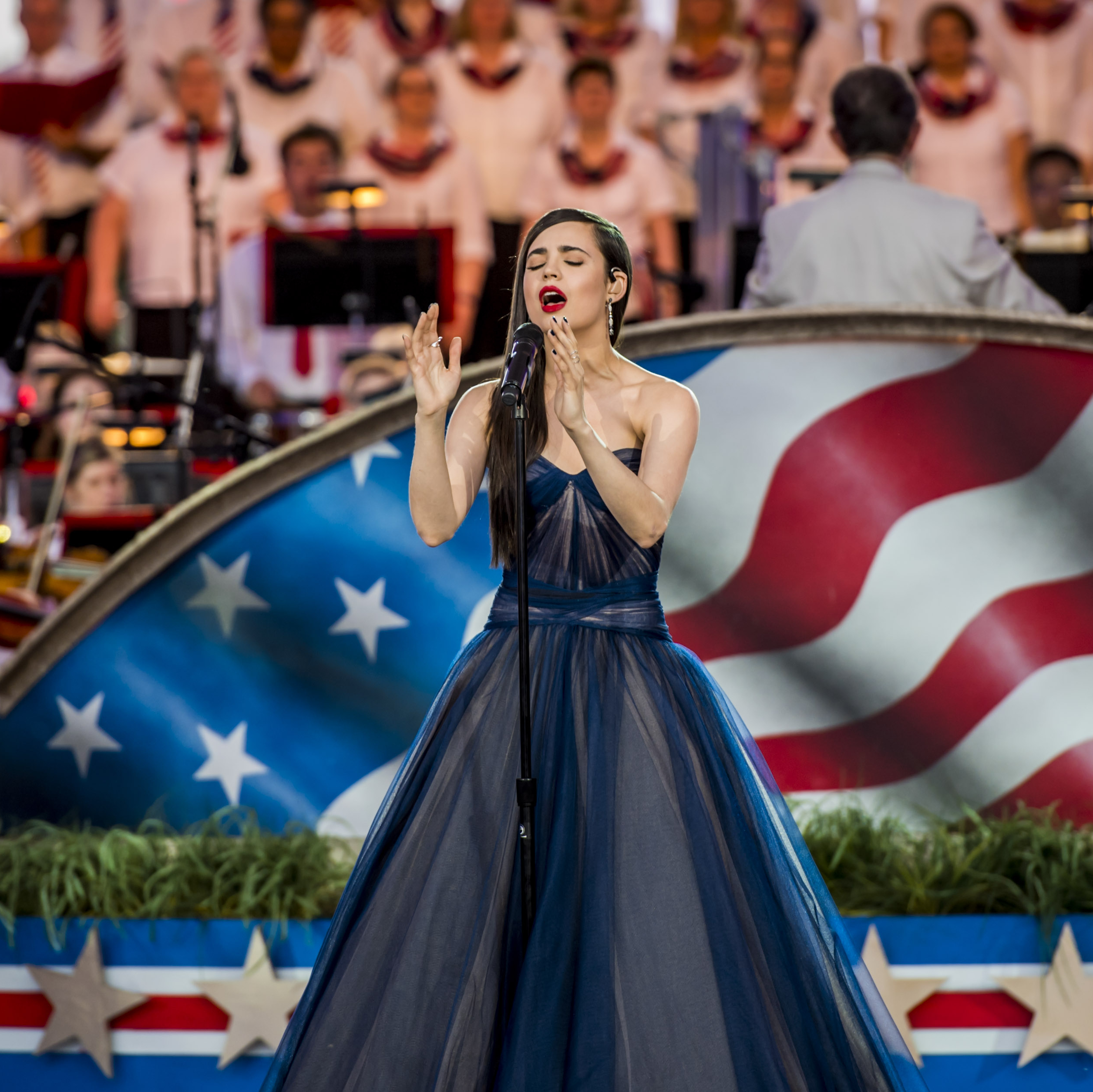
- Carson at the "A Capitol Fourth" Concert in July 2017
- Studio albums: 1
- Soundtrack albums: 4
- Singles: 19
- Music videos: 23
- Promotional singles: 10

American singer and actress Sofia Carson has released one studio album, four soundtrack albums, 19 singles (including three as a featured artist), 10 promotional singles and 23 music videos.

Carson first gained recognition for her music after lending her vocals to the soundtracks for the Descendants franchise, most notably on "Rotten to the Core" and "Chillin' Like a Villain" for which she also released solo versions for. The former song reached number 38 on the Billboard Hot 100. The soundtrack album for the first film in the series debuted at number-one on the US Billboard 200.

Carson's debut single, "Love Is the Name", was released in 2016 and reached number 36 on the US Latin Pop Songs chart. She followed this with a string of collaborations including "Different World" with Alan Walker and "Wildside" with Sabrina Carpenter. Her eponymous debut album followed in 2022 which featured various singles including "Fool's Gold" which reached number 34 on the US Pop Songs chart. That same year, Carson found success with the soundtrack to her film Purple Hearts (2022) which spawned the single "Come Back Home".

== Albums ==
=== Studio albums ===
List of albums
Title	Album details
Sofia Carson	Released: March 25, 2022; Format: CD, digital download, streaming; Label: Hollywood

=== Soundtrack albums ===
List of soundtrack albums, with selected chart positions
Title	Album details	Peak chart positions									
Title	Album details	US	US OST	AUS	BEL	FRA	GER	ITA	NL	NZ	SPA
Descendants	Released: July 31, 2015; Formats: CD, digital download, streaming; Label: Walt Disney	1	1	57	178	102	—	19	50	—	36
Descendants 2	Released: July 21, 2017; Formats: CD, digital download, streaming; Label: Walt Disney	6	1	64	192	135	—	—	—	— (Note: Descendants 2 did not enter the NZ Top 40 Albums Chart, but peaked at number 6 on the NZ Heatseekers Albums Chart.)	53
Descendants 3	Released: August 2, 2019; Formats: CD, digital download, streaming; Label: Walt Disney	7	1	36	110	—	—	—	—	—	—
Purple Hearts	Released: July 29, 2022; Formats: Digital download, streaming; Label: Hollywood	136	7	28	29	125	25	—	62	—	76
"—" denotes releases that did not chart or were not released in that territory.

== Compilations ==
List of compilations, with selected details
Title	Details
Leave Your Heart on the Dance Floor	Released: May 28, 2021; Label: Universal; Formats: Streaming

== Singles ==
=== As lead artist ===
List of singles as lead artist, showing year released, selected chart positions, certifications and album name
Title	Year	Peak chart positions										Certifications	Album
Title	Year	US Bub.	US Pop	US Dance/ Elec	CAN	GER	IRE	POL	SWI	UK	WW	Certifications	Album
"Love Is the Name" (Note: "Love Is the Name" are featured as bonus tracks on the Japanese edition of Sofia Carson.) (solo or featuring J Balvin)	2016	—	— (Note: "Love Is the Name" did not enter the Mainstream Top 40 chart but reached number 36 on the US Latin Pop Songs chart.)	—	—	—	—	22	—	—	—		Non-album singles
"I'm Gonna Love You"	2016	—	—	—	—	—	—	—	—	—	—		Non-album singles
"Back to Beautiful" (Note: "Back to Beautiful" are featured as bonus tracks on the Japanese edition of Sofia Carson.) (featuring Alan Walker)	2017	—	—	—	—	—	—	—	—	—	—		Non-album singles
"Ins and Outs" (Note: "Ins and Outs" are featured as bonus tracks on the Japanese edition of Sofia Carson.)	2017	—	—	—	—	—	—	—	—	—	—		Non-album singles
"Rumors" (with R3hab)	2018	—	—	— (Note: "Rumors" did not enter the US Dance/Electronic Songs chart but reached number four on both the US Dance Club songs chart and the US Dance/Electronic Digital Song Sale chart.)	—	—	—	10	—	—	—		The Wave
"Different World" (with Alan Walker and K-391 featuring Corsak)	2018	—	—	32	—	—	—	—	73	—	—		Different World
"I Luv U" (Note: "I Luv U" are featured as bonus tracks on the Japanese edition of Sofia Carson.) (with R3hab)	2019	—	—	21	—	—	—	—	—	—	—		Non-album singles
"Miss U More Than U Know" (Note: "Miss U More Than U Know" are featured as bonus tracks on the Japanese edition of Sofia Carson.) (with R3hab)	2020	—	—	32	—	—	—	—	—	—	—		Non-album singles
"Guess I'm a Liar" (Note: "Guess I'm a Liar" are featured as bonus tracks on the Japanese edition of Sofia Carson.)	2020	—	—	—	—	—	—	—	—	—	—		Non-album singles
"Hold on to Me" (Note: "Hold on to Me" are featured as bonus tracks on the Japanese edition of Sofia Carson.)	2020	—	—	—	—	—	—	—	—	—	—		Non-album singles
"Fool's Gold"	2021	—	34	—	—	—	—	—	—	—	—		Sofia Carson
"He Loves Me, But..."	2021	—	—	—	—	—	—	—	—	—	—		Sofia Carson
"Loud"	2022	—	—	—	—	—	—	—	—	—	—		Sofia Carson
"Come Back Home"	2022	17	—	—	80	76	79	—	28	71	75	MC: Gold; ZPAV: Platinum	Purple Hearts
"Applause" (From "Tell It Like a Woman")	2022	—	— (Note: "Applause" did not enter the Mainstream Top 40 chart but reached number 18 on the US Adult Contemporary chart.)	—	—	—	—	—	—	—	—		Non-album single
"I Hope You Know"	2024	—	—	—	—	—	—	—	—	—	—		TBA
"Joke's on Me"	2024	—	—	—	—	—	—	—	—	—	—		TBA
"If I Knew" (with Matteo Bocelli)	2024	—	—	—	—	—	—	—	—	—	—		TBA
"—" denotes a recording that did not chart or was not released in that territory.

=== As featured artist ===
List of singles as featured artist, showing year released, selected chart positions and album name
Title	Year	Peak chart positions	Album
Title	Year	US Dance	Album
"San Francisco" (Galantis featuring Sofia Carson)	2018	37	Non-album singles
"Grey Area" (Grey featuring Sofia Carson)	2019	—	Non-album singles
"White Christmas" (Andrea Bocelli featuring Sofia Carson)	2024	—	Non-album singles
"—" denotes a recording that did not chart or was not released.

=== Promotional singles ===
List of promotional singles, showing year released, selected chart positions, certifications and album name
Title	Year	Peak chart positions	Certifications	Album
Title	Year	US Bub.	Certifications	Album
"Rotten to the Core"	2015	5	RIAA: Platinum; BPI: Silver	Descendants
"I'm Your Girl" (with Dove Cameron)	2016	—		Descendants
"Rather Be with You" (with Dove Cameron, Lauryn McClain and Brenna D'Amico)	2016	—		Descendants 2
"Better Together" (with Dove Cameron)	2017	—		Descendants 2
"Ways to Be Wicked" (with Dove Cameron, Cameron Boyce and Booboo Stewart)	2017	1	RIAA: Platinum; PMB: 2× Platinum	Descendants 2
"Chillin' Like a Snowman"	2017	—		Non-album promotional single
"Good to Be Bad" (with Dove Cameron, Booboo Stewart, Cameron Boyce, Jadah Marie and Anna Cathcart)	2019	—	RIAA: Gold	Descendants 3
"VK Mashup" (with Dove Cameron, Cameron Boyce and Booboo Stewart)	2019	—		Descendants 3
"Feeling the Love" (with Cast of Descendants: The Royal Wedding)	2021	—		Non-album promotional single
"Glowin' Up"	2021	—		My Little Pony: A New Generation
"—" denotes a recording that did not chart or was not released.

== Other charted songs ==
List of songs, showing year released, selected chart positions, certifications and album name
Title	Year	Peak chart positions						Certifications	Album
Title	Year	US	US KDS	CAN	NZ Hot	KOR	WW	Certifications	Album
"Rotten to the Core" (with Dove Cameron, Cameron Boyce and Booboo Stewart)	2015	38	1	66	—	—	—	RIAA: Gold	Descendants
"Set It Off" (with Dove Cameron, Cameron Boyce, Booboo Stewart, Mitchell Hope, Sarah Jeffery and Jeff Lewis)	2015	— (Note: "Set It Off" did not enter the Billboard Hot 100, but peaked at number six on the Bubbling Under Hot 100 Singles chart.)	—	—	—	—	—		Descendants
"Wildside" (from Adventures in Babysitting) (with Sabrina Carpenter)	2016	—	4	—	—	—	—		Your Favorite Songs from 100 Disney Channel Original Movies
"Chillin' Like a Villain" (with Cameron Boyce, Booboo Stewart and Mitchell Hope)	2017	95	2	—	—	—	—	RIAA: Platinum	Descendants 2
"It's Goin' Down" (with Dove Cameron, Cameron Boyce, Booboo Stewart, China Anne McClain, Mitchell Hope, Thomas Doherty and Dylan Playfair)	2017	77	1	—	—	—	—	RIAA: Platinum	Descendants 2
"You and Me" (with Dove Cameron, Cameron Boyce, Booboo Stewart, Mitchell Hope and Jeff Lewis)	2017	— (Note: "You and Me" did not enter the Billboard Hot 100, but peaked at number 20 on the Bubbling Under Hot 100 Singles chart.)	—	—	—	—	—	RIAA: Gold	Descendants 2
"Night Falls" (with Dove Cameron, Cameron Boyce, Booboo Stewart, China Anne McClain, Thomas Doherty and Dylan Playfair)	2019	84	—	—	—	—	—	RIAA: Platinum; PMB: Platinum	Descendants 3
"One Kiss" (with Dove Cameron and China Anne McClain)	2019	—	—	—	—	—	—	RIAA: Gold; PMB: Gold	Descendants 3
"Break This Down" (with Dove Cameron, Cameron Boyce, Booboo Stewart, China Anne McClain, Thomas Doherty, Mitchell Hope, Sarah Jeffery, Jadah Marie and Dylan Playfair)	2019	—	—	—	—	—	—	RIAA: Gold; PMB: Platinum	Descendants 3
"I Didn't Know"	2022	—	—	—	38	—	—		Purple Hearts
"Slow Dance" (Jimin featuring Sofia Carson)	2024	—	—	—	32	122	159		Muse
"—" denotes releases that did not chart or were not released in that territory.

== Guest appearances ==
List of other appearances, showing year released, other artist(s) credited and album name
Title	Year	Other artist(s)	Album
"Sueña"	2016	—N/a	We Love Disney (Latino)
"Full Throttle"	2016	—N/a	A Cinderella Story: If the Shoe Fits
"Do You"	2016	Nicole Fortuin	A Cinderella Story: If the Shoe Fits
"Stuck on the Outside"	2016	—N/a	A Cinderella Story: If the Shoe Fits
"Why Don't I"	2016	—N/a	A Cinderella Story: If the Shoe Fits
"Why Don't I (Duet)"	2016	Thomas Law	A Cinderella Story: If the Shoe Fits
"Jolly to the Core"	2016	Dove Cameron, Cameron Boyce and Booboo Stewart	Disney Channel Holiday Hits
"Silent Night"	2016	—N/a	Disney Channel Holiday Hits
"Una Flor"	2018	—N/a	Adiós (Cover en Español)
"Ciclo sin Fin"	2019	—N/a	El Rey León
"Always"	2020	—N/a	Feel the Beat
"Siempre"	2020	—N/a	Feel the Beat
"Makin' Mayhem"	2023	Dr. Teeth and the Electric Mayhem	The Muppets Mayhem
"Moon River"	2024	Andrea Bocelli	Duets (30th Anniversary)

== Music videos ==
Title	Year	Other artist(s)	Director(s)	Ref.
As lead artist
"Rotten to the Core"	2015	None	Naren Wilks and Adam Santelli	
"Love Is the Name"	2016	None	Hannah Lux Davis	
"Love Is the Name"	2016	J Balvin	Hannah Lux Davis	
"Wildside"	2016	Sabrina Carpenter	Chase Langley	
"Full Throttle"	2016	None	Michelle Johnston	
"Jolly to the Core"	2016	Dove Cameron, Cameron Boyce and Booboo Stewart	Unknown	
"Back to Beautiful"	2017	Alan Walker	Emil Nava	
"Ways to Be Wicked"	2017	Dove Cameron, Cameron Boyce and Booboo Stewart	Kenny Ortega	
"Ins and Outs"	2017	None	John-Michael Triana	
"Rumors"	2018	R3hab	Mario Gonsalves	
"Different World" (Vertical Video)	2018	Alan Walker, K-391 and Corsak	Alexander Zarate Frez	
"Good to Be Bad"	2019	Dove Cameron, Booboo Stewart, Cameron Boyce, Jadah Marie and Anna Cathcart	Kenny Ortega	
"Ciclo sin Fin"	2019	None	Brenda Chapman	
"I Luv U"	2019	R3hab	Joseph Toman	
"Miss U More Than U Know"	2020	R3hab	Miles & Aj	
"Guess I'm a Liar"	2020	None	Hannah Lux Davis	
"Hold on to Me"	2020	None	Unknown	
"Fool's Gold"	2021	None	Hannah Lux Davis	
"He Loves Me, But..."	2021	None	Unknown	
"Glowin' Up"	2021	None	John Tashiro	
"Loud"	2022	None	Uri Schutzer	
"It's Only Love, Nobody Dies"	2022	None	Uri Schutzer	
"Come Back Home (Piano Version)"	2022	None	Elizabeth Allen Rosenbaum	
"Come Back Home"	2022	None	Elizabeth Allen Rosenbaum	
"Applause"	2022	None	Javiera Eyzaguirre	
"I Hope You Know" (Live Performance Video)	2024	None	Kyle Goldberg	
"Joke's on Me" (Live Performance Video)	2024	None	Kyle Goldberg	
"If I Knew"	2024	Matteo Bocelli	Gaetano Morbioli	
As featured artist
"San Francisco"	2018	Galantis	Dano Cerny	
"Grey Area"	2019	Grey	Sean Matsuyama	
Guest appearances
"Believe"	2015	Shawn Mendes	Jake Kasdan	
