= Josh Edmondson (songwriter) =

American Songwriter, Record Producer, Composer

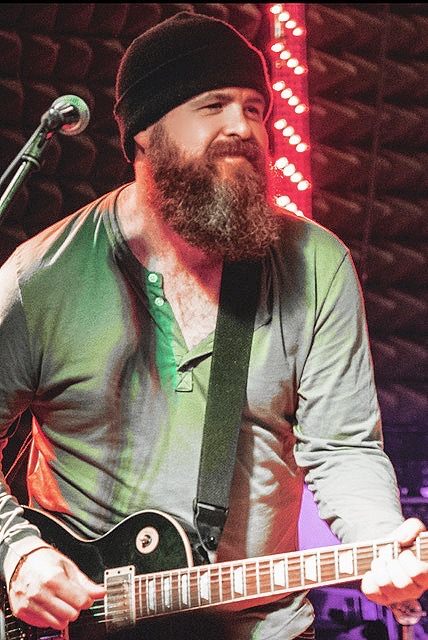

Background information
- Born: Joshua William Edmondson; Cincinnati, Ohio, United States
- Genres: Pop; indie pop; rock
- Occupations: Songwriter; record producer; arranger
- Instruments: Vocals; piano; guitar
- Years active: 1998–present
- Website: www.imdb.com

Josh Edmondson is an American songwriter and record producer based in Los Angeles, California. He contributed songs to the 2016 Grammy nominated album Falling into Place by Rebelution 's and G Loves 2021 Best Contemporary Blues nominated album The Juice. He co-produced the Emmy nominated song I Heard Your Voice in a Dream for NBC's Smash (American TV series). and has also written and produced RIAA certified songs for Disney's chart-topping Descendants Franchise that includes a No. 1 on Billboard 200 Other credits include Train (band), Mike Love of The Beach Boys, G. Love & Special Sauce, Goo Goo Dolls, Zendaya, and The O'Jays Most recently, Josh is writing/producing all original songs for NBC's new drama Ordinary Joe starring James Wolk.

== Producing credits ==
- 2022 "Fly Me to the Moon" - Super Bowl LVI - (eToro Ad)
- 2022 Jordin Sparks "New Star in the Sky" Rugrats
- 2021 NBC's Ordinary Joe – Season 1
- 2021 Christmas Again (Disney Channel Original Movie)
- 2021 Holiday Energy - A Loud House Christmas Nickelodeon
- 2020 LOL Surprise REMIX - Magic Star / Sony
- 2019 Soundtrack – Season 1 Soundtrack
- 2019 Mike Love - 12 Sides of Summer
- 2018 Mike Love - Reason for the Season
- 2017 Descendants 2 - Original Movie Soundtrack Walt Disney Records
- 2015 Descendants – Original Movie Soundtrack Walt Disney Records
- 2015 firekid – Firekid Atlantic Records
- 2015 Liv & Maddie – Original TV Soundtrack Walt Disney Records
- 2015 Hunter Hunted – Ready For You RCA
- 2015 Teen Beach 2 – Original Movie Soundtrack Walt Disney Records
- 2015 Band Of Merrymakers – Welcome To Our Christmas Party Sony Masterworks
- 2013 Smash - Season 2 Soundtrack
- 2013 Hollywood Undead – Notes From The Underground Interscope Records
- 2013 The Mowgli's – Waiting for the Dawn Island Records
- 2012 Train – California 27 – Sony Music

== Engineering credits ==
- 2019 The Ojays – Start Stopping' S-Curve Records
- 2019 Mike Love – 12 Sides of Summer
- 2019 Goo Goo Dolls – Miracle Pill Warner Music
- 2018 Mike Love – Reason for the Season
- 2013 Oh Land – Wishbone Federal Prism Records
- 2012 Blues Traveler – Suzie Cracks The Whip Concord Records
- 2011 Nikki Jean – Pennies in a Jar S-Curve Records
- 2008 Charlotte Sometimes – Waves and the Both Of Us Geffen Records

== Songwriting credits ==
=== In films ===
Song title	Year	Artists	Film title	Soundtrack	Label	Notables
Rebels of the Runway	2021	Charity Daw as Fame Queen	LOL Surprise: The Movie	LOL Surprise: The Movie (Original Motion Picture Soundtrack)	Netflix	
Christmas Again	2021	Scarlett Estevez	Christmas Again	Christmas Again (Original Motion Picture Soundtrack)	Walt Disney Records	
Holiday Energy	2021	Charity Daw	A Loud House Christmas	A Loud House Christmas (Original Motion Picture Soundtrack)	Nickelodeon	
VK Mashup	2019	Dove Cameron, Sofia Carson, Cameron Boyce, Booboo Stewart	Descendants 3	Descendants 3 (Original TV Movie Soundtrack)	Walt Disney Records	No. 1 Billboard Soundtracks; No. 7 Billboard 200
Ways to Be Wicked	2017	Dove Cameron, Sofia Carson, Cameron Boyce, Booboo Stewart	Descendants 2	Descendants 2 (Original TV Movie Soundtrack)	Walt Disney Records	RIAA Certified Gold; No. 1 Billboard Soundtracks; No. 1 Billboard Kid Albums; No. 6 Billboard 200; 3x VEVO Certified
Secret Crush	2017	Kang Ji-young	Revenge Girl ( リベンジgirl)	Secret Crush〜사랑 멈출 수 없다〜 /MY ID (EP)	Sony Japan	Peak No. 29 Oricon
Wanna Be With You	2015	Jordan Fisher	Teen Beach 2	Teen Beach 2 (Soundtrack)	Walt Disney Records	No. 1 Billboard Soundtracks; No. 10 Billboard 200
Set It Off	2015	Dove Cameron, Sofia Carson, Cameron Boyce, Booboo Stewart, Sarah Jeffery, Mitchell Hope	Descendants	Descendants (Original Soundtrack)	Walt Disney Records	RIAA Certified Gold; No. 1 Billboard Soundtracks; No. 1 Billboard Kid Albums; No. 1 Billboard 200
Legendary	2015	Megan Nicole	Summer Forever	Summer Forever (Original Soundtrack)	Hollywood Records	-
Lovesick Undercover	2015	Megan Nicole	Summer Forever	Summer Forever (Original Soundtrack)	Hollywood Records	-
Never Say Never	2015	Megan Nicole, Alyson Stoner, Anna Grace Barlow	Summer Forever	Summer Forever (Original Soundtrack)	Hollywood Records	-
Weekend Warriors	2015	Megan Nicole, Alyson Stoner, Anna Grace Barlow	Summer Forever	Summer Forever (Original Soundtrack)	Hollywood Records	-
Make An X	2015	Megan Nicole, Alyson Stoner, Anna Grace Barlow	Summer Forever	Summer Forever (Original Soundtrack)	Hollywood Records	-
Ours To Lose	2015	Megan Nicole, Alyson Stoner, Anna Grace Barlow, Ryan McCartan	Summer Forever	Summer Forever (Original Soundtrack)	Hollywood Records	-
About Tonight	2015	Megan Nicole, Ryan McCartan	Summer Forever	Summer Forever (Original Soundtrack)	Hollywood Records	-
Powerless	2015	Alyson Stoner	Summer Forever	Summer Forever (Original Soundtrack)	Hollywood Records	-
Big Time	2015	Ryan McCartan	Summer Forever	Summer Forever (Original Soundtrack)	Hollywood Records	-
Ur Your Own Star	2014	American Girl	An American Girl: Isabelle Dances Into the Spotlight	An American Girl: Isabelle Dances Into the Spotlight (Original Soundtrack)	Mattel	-

=== In television ===
Single Title	Year	Artist(s)	Show Title	Soundtrack	Label
Malibu Dreamin'	2022	Rainbow High (dolls) feat. Paris Hilton	Rainbow High (web series)	_	Netflix
Colors Go POW!	2022	Rainbow High (dolls)	Rainbow High (web series)	_	Netflix
Fly Me to the Moon	2022	Genevieve (musician)	Super Bowl LVI	"Flying Your Way" ad	eToro
New Star in the Sky	2022	Jordin Sparks	Rugrats (2021 TV series)	Rescuing Cynthia (Soundtrack)	Nickelodeon
Soldier On	2021	James Wolk	Ordinary Joe	Music from the Series: Ordinary Joe	Hollywood Records / NBC
Landing	2021	James Wolk	Ordinary Joe	Music from the Series: Ordinary Joe	Hollywood Records / NBC
Down The Road	2021	James Wolk	Ordinary Joe	Music from the Series: Ordinary Joe	Hollywood Records / NBC
Away You Go	2021	James Wolk	Ordinary Joe	Music from the Series: Ordinary Joe	Hollywood Records / NBC
All or Nothing	2021	James Wolk	Ordinary Joe	Music from the Series: Ordinary Joe	Hollywood Records / NBC
Ways To Be Wicked	2021	Jojo Siwa and Jenna Johnson (dancer)	Dancing with the Stars (American season 30)	_	American Broadcasting Company
King Size Bed	2021	Jamra	All American (TV series)	_	The CW
Pastelito!	2021	Hialeah High	Gentefied	_	Netflix
Set It Off Remix	2021	Cheyenne Jackson	Descendants Remix Dance Party: A Disney Music Event	Descendants Remix Dance Party (Soundtrack)	Walt Disney Records
Glitters	2020	Charity Daw	Spinning Out	Spinning Out Season 1	Netflix
Work Done	2019	Melissa Gorga, Porsha Williams, Sonja Morgan	Fiber One Campaign	Work Done presented by Fiber One	Mindshare (firm)
Nightshade	2018	Alberto Rosende	Shadowhunters (Freeform)	Shadowhunters (Original Television Series Soundtrack)	Hollywood Records
Monroe Is The Man	2017	Andrew Dice Clay	Dice (Showtime)	–	–
Fragile World	2017	Alberto Rosende	Shadowhunters (Freeform)	Shadowhunters (Original Television Series Soundtrack)	Hollywood Records
Bronze Bond	2016	–	Bronze Bond Marathon (Esquire Network)	–	–
Say Hey	2015	Dove Cameron	Liv and Maddie (Disney Channel)	Liv and Maddie: Music from the TV Series	Walt Disney Records
Hot Head	2014	–	Reckless (CBS)	–	–
Ring Ring	2014	Bella Thorne	Shake It Up (Disney Channel)	Disney Channel Play It Loud	Walt Disney Records
Shake Santa Shake	2012	Zendaya	Shake It Up (American TV series) (Disney Channel)	Disney Channel Holiday Playlist	Walt Disney Records
Who I Am	2012	Ross Lynch	Austin & Ally (Disney Channel)	Austin & Ally: Turn It Up	Walt Disney Records

=== Recorded by artists ===
Single Title	Year	Artist(s)	Album	Label	Notables
Rebels of The Runway	2020	LOL Surprise!	LOL Surprise! REMIX	Magic Star	_
I'm A Queen!	2020	LOL Surprise!	LOL Surprise! REMIX	Magic Star	_
Surprise Me	2020	LOL Surprise!	LOL Surprise! REMIX	Magic Star	_
Birmingham	2019	G Love and Special Sauce (feat) Robert Randolph and the Family Band and Keb Mo	The Juice	Brushfire Records	2021 Grammy Nominee for Best Contemporary Blues Album
Me and the Mistletoe	2019	Laura Marano (feat) Kurt Hugo Schneider	Me and the Mistletoe (Single)	Flip Phone Records	MTV Best Original Holiday Songs Of 2019 List
Oakland	2019	birthday	blue EP	Sony Music	–
Emelia Earhart	2019	birthday	blue EP	Sony Music	–
Boomerang	2018	firekid ft. (Rory Feek)	Boomerang (Single)	–	–
Stranger(1993)	2018	birthday	Stranger(1993) (Single)	–	–
Ways to Be Wicked	2017	Dove Cameron, Sofia Carson, Cameron Boyce, Booboo Stewart	Descendants 2 (Original TV Movie Soundtrack)	Walt Disney Records	RIAA Certified Gold; No. 1 Billboard Bubbling Under Hot 100 Singles
悪の力を呼び覚ませ (Ways To Be Wicked – Japanese version)	2017	Miracle Vell Magic	Thank You Disney	Avex	-
Mil Formas De Ser Un Vilano (Ways To Be Wicked – Castellano version)	2017	Pepper3	Disney Channel (Latin American TV channel)	Walt Disney Records	-
Weekend Walking	2017	birthday	Weekend Walking (Single)	Atlantic Records	–
Grown Up Kids	2017	birthday	Subtle Love (EP)		–
Subtle Love	2017	birthday	Subtle Love (EP)		–
Parade	2017	birthday	Subtle Love (EP)		–
Babyface	2017	birthday	Subtle Love (EP)		–
Cathedrals	2017	birthday	Subtle Love (EP)		–
Le Drugs	2017	birthday	Subtle Love (EP)		–
Santa Barbara	2016	Rebelution (band)	Falling into Place	Easy Star Records	2016 Grammy Nominee for Best Contemporary Blues Album
Born To Love	2016	Punch !nc	The High Life	S-Curve Records	–
Holiday in LA	2016	Band of Merrymakers	Welcome To Our Christmas Party	Sony Masterworks	Peak No. 9 Billboard Holiday Chart
Better My Love	2015	Hunter Hunted (band)	Ready For You	RCA	–
That Girl	2015	G Love and Special Sauce	Love Saves The Day	Brushfire Records	–
Kids in the Moonlight	2015	We the Kings	So Far	S-Curve Records	–
Magic Mountain	2015	firekid	firekid	Atlantic Records	Peak No. 16 Alt Nation Alt 18
Lay By Me	2015	firekid	firekid	Atlantic Records	–
Movin' On	2015	firekid	firekid	Atlantic Records	–
Die For Alabama	2015	firekid	firekid	Atlantic Records	Theme Song for NASCAR GEICO 500
Boomerang	2015	firekid	firekid	Atlantic Records	–
Anna Lee	2015	firekid	firekid	Atlantic Records	–
Getaway Car	2015	firekid	firekid	Atlantic Records	–
Statues	2015	firekid	firekid	Atlantic Records	–
Gospel	2015	firekid	firekid	Atlantic Records	–
The World Is Mine	2015	firekid	firekid	Atlantic Records	–
