= It's Goin' Down (Descendants song) =

2017 song from Descendants 2

Song by Dove Cameron, Sofia Carson, Cameron Boyce, Booboo Stewart, China Anne McClain, Mitchell Hope, Thomas Doherty and Dylan Playfair

from the album Descendants 2
- Recorded: 2016
- Genre: Dance-pop, hip hop, teen pop, synth-pop
- Length: 4:12
- Label: Walt Disney
- Songwriters: Antonina Armato; Tim James; Tom Sturges; Adam Schmalholz
- Producers: Armato; James

"It's Goin' Down" is a song from Disney Channel's 2017 television film Descendants 2, whose music and lyrics were composed by Antonina Armato, Tim James, Tom Sturges and Adam Schmalholz. The song was performed in the film by Dove Cameron, Sofia Carson, Cameron Boyce, Booboo Stewart, China Anne McClain, Mitchell Hope, Thomas Doherty and Dylan Playfair. The song peaked at number 77 in the Billboard Hot 100.

== Charts ==
Chart (2015)	Peak position
US Billboard Hot 100	77
US Digital Song Sales (Billboard)	47
US Kid Digital Songs (Billboard)	1

== Certifications ==
Region	Certification	Certified units/sales
United Kingdom (BPI)	Silver	200,000^{‡}
United States (RIAA)	Platinum	1,000,000^{‡}
^{‡} Sales+streaming figures based on certification alone.
