= J. Lewis =

American singer-songwriter

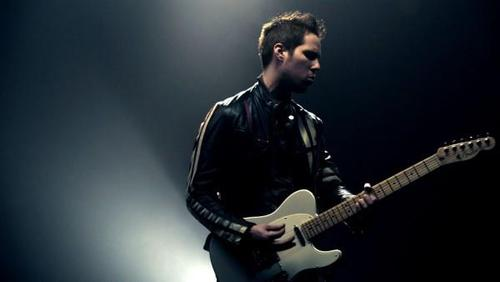
J. Lewis

Jeff Lewis is a singer-songwriter from Dallas, Texas. He was a contestant on The Voice Season 4 on Team Usher.

== Notable work ==
Lewis is featured on the Lego Batman soundtrack on the track "Friends Are Family" by Oh, Hush! feat. Will Arnett and Jeff Lewis. The soundtrack debuted at number 18 and peaked at number 11 on the Billboard Soundtrack charts in 2017.

Lewis also made more songs with Oh, Hush!, including "Found My Place." from The Lego Ninjago Movie soundtrack and "Ready for the Ride" from Disneyland Paris 30th anniversary parade show "Dream.. and Shine Brighter!".

Lewis is also featured on the soundtrack of the 2015 Disney Channel Original Movie Descendants, providing the singing voice of King Ben, played by Mitchell Hope. The song "Did I Mention" from the film is performed by Lewis and Hope, and peaked at number 2 on the Billboard Bubbling Under Hot 100 Singles chart. "Set It Off", performed by Lewis, Hope, Dove Cameron, Sofia Carson, Sarah Jeffery, Cameron Boyce, and Booboo Stewart, debuted at number 17 and peaked at number 6 on the Billboard Bubbling Under Hot 100 Singles chart. In 2017, Lewis returned for the Descendants 2 soundtrack in the song "You and Me."
