= Descendants 2 (soundtrack) =

Soundtrack album by Descendants cast
- Released: July 21, 2017
- Recorded: July – August 2016
- Genre: Pop
- Length: 32:30
- Label: Walt Disney
- Producers: Tijs Michiel Verwest, Rob Cavallo, Felicity Jones, Martin Garrix, Sylvia Massy, Joel Thomas Zimmerman, Oli Sykes

Singles from Descendants 2
- 1. "Ways to Be Wicked" Released: April 14, 2017; 2. "What's My Name" Released: June 2, 2017

Descendants 2 is a soundtrack album by the cast of the film of the same name, released on July 21, 2017, by Walt Disney Records. The soundtrack and lead single, "Ways to Be Wicked", was announced on April 12, 2017. The soundtrack was released on July 21, 2017.

The soundtrack debuted at number six on the U.S. Billboard 200 after earning 46,000 album-equivalent units, 35,000 of which were pure sales; sales for the soundtrack's debuting week were up from the previous film. It dropped to number nine on the chart for its second week, earning an additional 27,000 units. It also charted in 8 other countries including Australia, Canada, France, and the United Kingdom, at numbers 64, 25, 135, and 5, respectively.

== Background ==
Descendants 2 was released on July 21, 2017, along with the release of its parent film. The soundtrack consists of 11 songs, six of which are originally from the film. It also includes renditions of “Kiss the Girl” and “Poor Unfortunate Souls” from the 1989 animated musical fantasy film, The Little Mermaid. Additionally, three songs from Descendants: Wicked World was also included in the soundtrack including "Together", "Evil", and "Rather Be with You".

In an Interview with Billboard talking about the film's music, Disney Channel's VP of music and soundtracks, Steven Vincent, said that the first step in making the sequel's music was "developing a [musical] palette that builds on what we had and what kids loved about the first one". "It all starts with the scene and what energy fits that idea" Vincent added.

Talking about the film's original song, "It's Going Down", songwriter Antonina Armato stated that "The [song] was never in the script...The scene was supposed to be all dialogue, but [director] Kenny Ortega and Steven Vincent had this ambitious idea to create a big musical moment that had influences from Hamilton, hip-hop and West Side Story, using counter melodies and chants. Luckily, we came through for them".

== Commercial performance ==
The soundtrack debuted at number six on the Billboard 200 with 46,000 album-equivalent units, tallying higher than Descendants' first week sales which earned 42,000 units. The soundtrack fell to number nine the next week earning an additional 27,000 units. It also debuted at number 13 on the UK Soundtrack Albums Chart, and later peaked at number five. The soundtrack also charted in Australia, Canada, and France, at numbers 64, 25, 135, respectively.

== Singles ==
"Ways to Be Wicked", performed by Dove Cameron, Sofia Carson, Cameron Boyce, and Booboo Stewart, premiered on Radio Disney and then was officially released as first single on April 14 along with the pre-order of the soundtrack. It debuted at number 1 on the Billboard Bubbling Under Hot 100 Singles. The song is produced by Sam Hollander and Josh Edmondson who wrote the song with Grant Michaels and Charity Daw. "What's My Name", performed by China Anne McClain, Thomas Doherty, and Dylan Playfair, premiered on Radio Disney and then was officially released as second single on June 2, 2017.

=== Promotional singles ===
"Rather Be With You", from "Descendants: Wicked World", performed by Dove Cameron, Sofia Carson, Lauryn McClain, and Brenna D'Amico, was released as first promotional single on October 28, 2016. "Evil", from Wicked World, performed by Dove Cameron, was released on December 9, 2016, as second promotional single. "Better Together", from Wicked World, performed by Dove Cameron and Sofia Carson, was released as third and final promotional single on March 3, 2017.

=== Other charted songs ===
"Chillin' Like a Villain", performed by Sofia Carson, Cameron Boyce, Booboo Stewart, and Mitchell Hope, peaked at number 95 on the US Billboard Hot 100. "It's Goin' Down", performed by Dove Cameron, Sofia Carson, Cameron Boyce, Booboo Stewart, China Anne McClain, Mitchell Hope, Thomas Doherty, and Dylan Playfair, peaked at number 77 on the Hot 100. "You and Me", performed by Dove Cameron, Sofia Carson, Cameron Boyce, Booboo Stewart, Mitchell Hope, and Jeff Lewis, debuted at number 20 on the Billboard Bubbling Under Hot 100 Singles.

== Track listing ==
Descendants 2 (Original TV Movie Soundtrack) – Standard edition
No.	Title	Writer(s)	Performer(s)	Length
1.	"Ways to Be Wicked"	Sam Hollander; Josh Edmondson; Grant Michaels; Charity Daw	Dove Cameron; Sofia Carson; Cameron Boyce; Booboo Stewart	3:38
2.	"What's My Name"	Antonina Armato; Tim James; Tom Sturges; Adam Schmalholz	China Anne McClain; Thomas Doherty; Dylan Playfair	3:10
3.	"Chillin' Like a Villain"	Armato; James; Sturges; Schmalholz	Carson; Boyce; Stewart; Mitchell Hope	3:13
4.	"Space Between"	Shayna Mordue; Stephen Mark Conley; Tyler Shamy; Andy Dodd	Cameron; Carson	3:26
5.	"It's Goin' Down"	Armato; James; Sturges; Schmalholz	Cameron; Carson; Boyce; Stewart; McClain; Hope; Doherty; Playfair	4:12
6.	"You and Me"	Mitch Allan; Nikki Leonti	Cameron; Carson; Boyce; Stewart; Hope; Jeff Lewis	3:32
7.	"Kiss the Girl"	Alan Menken; Howard Ashman	Cameron; Carson; Boyce; Stewart; McClain; Doherty	2:44
8.	"Poor Unfortunate Souls"	Menken; Ashman	McClain	2:43
9.	"Better Together" (from Descendants: Wicked World)	Matt Wong; Jack Kugell; Hannah Jones	Cameron; Carson	2:44
10.	"Evil" (from Descendants: Wicked World)	Dan Book; Shelly Peiken	Cameron	2:54
11.	"Rather Be with You" (from Descendants: Wicked World)	Jeannie Lurie; Chen Neeman; Aris Archontis	Cameron; Carson; Lauryn McClain; Brenna D'Amico	2:14
Total length:				32:30

== Charts ==
=== Weekly ===
Chart (2017–2024)	Peak position
Australian Albums (ARIA)	64
Belgian Albums (Ultratop Flanders)	102
Canadian Albums (Billboard)	25
Dutch Albums (MegaCharts)	102
French Albums (SNEP)	135
New Zealand Heatseekers Albums (RMNZ)	6
Spanish Albums (PROMUSICAE)	53
UK Compilation Albums (OCC)	24
UK Soundtrack Albums (OCC)	5
US Billboard 200	6
US Kid Albums (Billboard)	1
US Soundtrack Albums (Billboard)	1

=== Year-end ===
Chart (2017)	Position
US Billboard 200	175
US Kid Albums (Billboard)	5
US Soundtrack Albums (Billboard)	11

== Certifications ==
Region	Certification	Certified units/sales
Denmark (IFPI Danmark)	Gold	10,000^{‡}
United Kingdom (BPI)	Gold	100,000^{‡}
United States (RIAA)	Gold	500,000^{‡}
^{‡} Sales+streaming figures based on certification alone.
