= Charity Daw =

American Singer-Songwriter

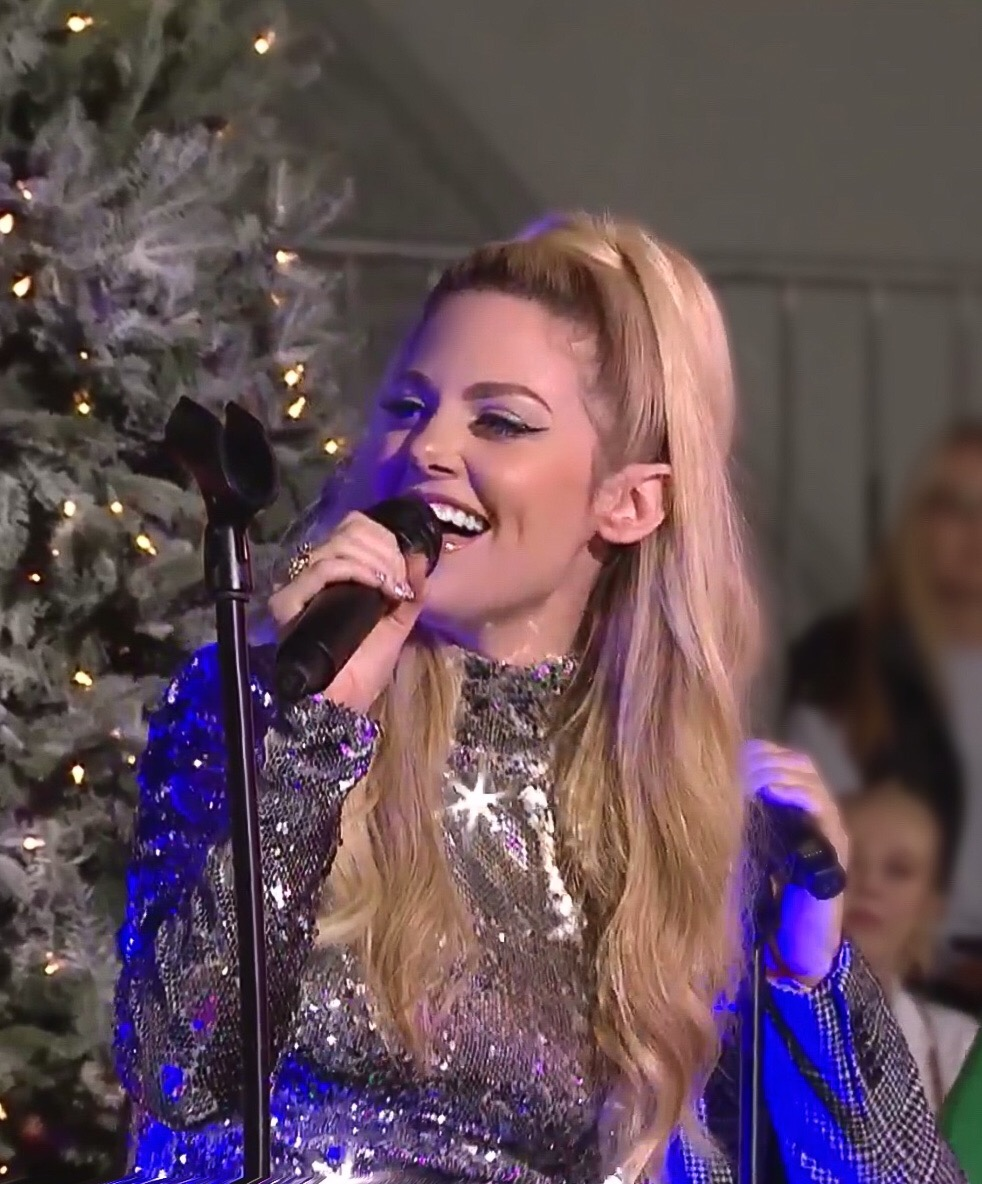
- Charity performing at the 2018 Hollywood Christmas Parade

Background information
- Born: Charity Joy Daw; Miami, FL
- Genres: Pop, Latin music, musical theatre, film & TV
- Occupations: Vocalist, songwriter, record producer, VO actress
- Years active: 2007–present
- Website: www.charitydaw.com

Charity Daw is a Cuban-American singer and songwriter based in Los Angeles. She has written RIAA certified songs for Disney's chart-topping Descendants (franchise) that includes a No. 1 on Billboard 200, as well as Dove Cameron, Jordin Sparks, Ally Brooke (Fifth Harmony), LOL Surprise, Mattel's American Girl, Jordan Fisher, Bella Thorne, We the Kings, Porsha Williams & Melissa Gorga of The Real Housewives franchise, and Andrew Dice Clay's Showtime series DICE.

Songs she has written have been performed on Grand Ole Opry, Dancing with the Stars, Dancing with the Stars: Juniors, Good Morning America, The Today Show and the 2018 Radio Disney Music Awards.

As a performer, she has appeared on Jimmy Kimmel Live!, NBC's Christmas in Rockefeller Center, Good Day L.A., and Hallmark's Home & Family. Charity also contributed the song "La Rubia" to the Ubisoft video game, Far Cry 6 Soundtrack.

== Early life ==
Charity studied fine art and music at Miami, Florida's schools for the arts; the Design and Architecture High School (DASH) and New World School of the Arts. As a student, the release of her first self-produced album led to a spot on American Idol season 7 followed by a stint in Nashville, TN where she developed her songwriting and performing skills on Music Row.

== Tours ==
- Band of Merrymakers – 2016, 2017, 2018

== Songwriting credits ==
=== In films ===
Song title	Year	Artists	Film title	Soundtrack	Label	Notables
"View From Here"	2025		Dora and the Search for Sol Dorado		Nickelodeon	
"Dime Que Me Amas"	2021	Cast	10 Songs for Charity	Original Cast Recording	De Productie (Netherlands)	2022 African Film Festival, Inc. Official Selection; Giffoni Film Festival 2021
"Christmas Again"	2021	Scarlett Estevez	Christmas Again	Christmas Again (Original Motion Picture Soundtrack)	Walt Disney Records	
"Rebels of the Runway"	2021	Charity Daw as Fame Queen	LOL Surprise: The Movie	LOL Surprise: The Movie (Original Motion Picture Soundtrack)	Netflix	
"Holiday Energy"	2021	Charity Daw	A Loud House Christmas	A Loud House Christmas (Original Motion Picture Soundtrack)	Nickelodeon	
"Hey Love"	2021	Charity Daw	Courting Mom & Dad		Universal Pictures	
VK Mashup	2019	Dove Cameron, Sofia Carson, Cameron Boyce, Booboo Stewart	Descendants 3	Descendants 3 (soundtrack)	Walt Disney Records	No. 1 Billboard Soundtracks; No. 7 Billboard 200
"Ways to Be Wicked"	2017	Dove Cameron, Sofia Carson, Cameron Boyce, Booboo Stewart	Descendants 2	Descendants 2 (soundtrack)	Walt Disney Records	RIAA Certified Gold; No. 1 Billboard Soundtracks; No. 1 Billboard Kid Albums; No. 6 Billboard 200; 3x VEVO Certified
"Secret Crush"	2017	Kang Ji-young	Revenge Girl ( リベンジgirl)	Secret Crush〜사랑 멈출 수 없다〜 /MY ID (EP)	Sony Japan	Peak No. 29 Oricon
"Wanna Be With You"	2015	Jordan Fisher	Teen Beach 2		Walt Disney Records	No. 1 Billboard Soundtracks; No. 10 Billboard 200
"Set It Off"	2015	Dove Cameron, Sofia Carson, Cameron Boyce, Booboo Stewart, Sarah Jeffery, Mitchell Hope	Descendants	Descendants (soundtrack)	Walt Disney Records	RIAA Certified Gold; No. 1 Billboard Soundtracks; No. 1 Billboard Kid Albums; No. 1 Billboard 200
"Legendary"	2015	Megan Nicole	Summer Forever	Summer Forever (Original Soundtrack)	Hollywood Records	
"Lovesick Undercover"	2015	Megan Nicole	Summer Forever	Summer Forever (Original Soundtrack)	Hollywood Records	
"Never Say Never"	2015	Megan Nicole, Alyson Stoner, Anna Grace Barlow	Summer Forever	Summer Forever (Original Soundtrack)	Hollywood Records	
"Weekend Warriors"	2015	Megan Nicole, Alyson Stoner, Anna Grace Barlow	Summer Forever	Summer Forever (Original Soundtrack)	Hollywood Records	
"Make An X"	2015	Megan Nicole, Alyson Stoner, Anna Grace Barlow	Summer Forever	Summer Forever (Original Soundtrack)	Hollywood Records	
"Ours To Lose"	2015	Megan Nicole, Alyson Stoner, Anna Grace Barlow, Ryan McCartan	Summer Forever	Summer Forever (Original Soundtrack)	Hollywood Records	
"About Tonight"	2015	Megan Nicole, Ryan McCartan	Summer Forever	Summer Forever (Original Soundtrack)	Hollywood Records	
"Powerless"	2015	Alyson Stoner	Summer Forever	Summer Forever (Original Soundtrack)	Hollywood Records	
"Big Time"	2015	Ryan McCartan	Summer Forever	Summer Forever (Original Soundtrack)	Hollywood Records	
"Ur Your Own Star"	2014	American Girl	An American Girl: Isabelle Dances Into the Spotlight	An American Girl: Isabelle Dances Into the Spotlight (Original Soundtrack)	Mattel	-

=== In television ===
Single title	Year	Artist(s)	Show title	Soundtrack	Label/Network
"Malibu Dreamin'"	2022	Rainbow High (dolls) feat. Paris Hilton	Rainbow High (web series)		Netflix
"Colors Go POW!"	2022	Rainbow High (dolls)	Rainbow High (web series)		Netflix
"Fly Me to the Moon"	2022	Genevieve (musician)	Super Bowl LVI	"Flying Your Way" ad	eToro
"New Star in the Sky"	2022	Jordin Sparks	Rugrats	Rescuing Cynthia (Soundtrack)	Nickelodeon
"Ways To Be Wicked"	2021	JoJo Siwa and Jenna Johnson (dancer)	Dancing with the Stars (American season 30)		American Broadcasting Company
"The Colors"	2021		Queer Eye		Netflix
"King Size Bed"	2021	Jamra	All American		The CW
"Pastelito!"	2021	Hialeah High	Gentefied		Netflix
"Set It Off Remix"	2021	Cheyenne Jackson	Descendants Remix Dance Party: A Disney Music Event	Descendants Remix Dance Party (Soundtrack)	Walt Disney Records
Reset	2020	Kate Hall for Denmark	Free European Song Contest		ProSieben
"We Are A Family"	2020	Ally Brooke	The 94th Annual Macy's Thanksgiving Day Parade		NBC
"Glitters"	2020	Charity Daw	Spinning Out		Netflix
"Work Done"	2019	Melissa Gorga, Porsha Williams, Sonja Morgan	Fiber One Campaign	Work Done presented by Fiber One	Mindshare
"Nightshade"	2018	Alberto Rosende	Shadowhunters (Freeform)	Shadowhunters (Original Television Series Soundtrack)	Hollywood Records
"Monroe Is The Man"	2017	Andrew Dice Clay	Dice (Showtime)		
"Fragile World"	2017	Alberto Rosende	Shadowhunters (Freeform)	Shadowhunters (Original Television Series Soundtrack)	Hollywood Records
"Bronze Bond"	2016		Bronze Bond Marathon (Esquire Network)		
"Say Hey"	2015	Dove Cameron	Liv and Maddie (Disney Channel)	Liv and Maddie: Music from the TV Series	Walt Disney Records
"Hot Head"	2014		Reckless (CBS)		
"Ring Ring"	2014	Bella Thorne	Shake It Up (Disney Channel)	Disney Channel Play It Loud	Walt Disney Records

=== Recorded by artists ===
Single title	Year	Artist(s)	Album	Label	Notables
"Rebels of The Runway"	2020	LOL Surprise! / Charity Daw as Fame Queen	LOL Surprise! REMIX	Magic Star	2021 Doll of the Year: Toy Association Award Finalist; LOL Surprise! Live! World Tour 2021-2022
"I'm A Queen!"	2020	LOL Surprise! / Charity Daw as Fame Queen	LOL Surprise! REMIX	Magic Star	2021 Doll of the Year: Toy Association Award Finalist; LOL Surprise! Live! World Tour 2021-2022
"Surprise Me"	2020	LOL Surprise! / Charity Daw as Fame Queen	LOL Surprise! REMIX	Magic Star	2021 Doll of the Year: Toy Association Award Finalist; LOL Surprise! Live! World Tour 2021-2022
"Me and the Mistletoe"	2019	Laura Marano (feat) Kurt Hugo Schneider	"Me and the Mistletoe" (Single)	Flip Phone Records	MTV Best Original Holiday Songs Of 2019 List
"Oakland"	2019	birthday	blue EP	Sony Music	
"Emelia Aerhart"	2019	birthday	blue EP	Sony Music	
"Boomerang"	2018	firekid ft. (Rory Feek)	"Boomerang" (Single)		
"Stranger (1993)"	2018	birthday	"Stranger (1993)" (Single)		
"Ways to Be Wicked"	2017	Dove Cameron, Sofia Carson, Cameron Boyce, Booboo Stewart	Descendants 2 (soundtrack)	Walt Disney Records	RIAA Certified Gold; No. 1 Billboard Bubbling Under Hot 100 Singles
"悪の力を呼び覚ませ" ("Ways To Be Wicked" – Japanese version)	2017	Miracle Vell Magic	Thank You Disney	Avex	-
"Mil Formas De Ser Un Vilano" ("Ways To Be Wicked" – Castellano version)	2017	Pepper3	Disney Channel (Latin American TV channel)	Walt Disney Records	
"Weekend Walking"	2017	birthday	"Weekend Walking" (Single)	Atlantic Records	
"Grown Up Kids"	2017	birthday	Subtle Love (EP)		
"Subtle Love"	2017	birthday	Subtle Love (EP)		
"Parade"	2017	birthday	Subtle Love (EP)		
"Babyface"	2017	birthday	Subtle Love (EP)		
"Cathedrals"	2017	birthday	Subtle Love (EP)		
"Le Drugs"	2017	birthday	Subtle Love (EP)		
"Born To Love"	2016	Punch !nc	The High Life	S-Curve Records	
"Holiday in LA"	2016	Band of Merrymakers	Welcome To Our Christmas Party	Sony Masterworks	Peak No. 9 Billboard Holiday Chart
"Kids in the Moonlight"	2015	We the Kings	So Far	S-Curve Records	
"Magic Mountain"	2015	firekid	firekid	Atlantic Records	Peak No. 16 Alt Nation Alt 18
"Lay By Me"	2015	firekid	firekid	Atlantic Records	
"Movin' On"	2015	firekid	firekid	Atlantic Records	
"Die For Alabama"	2015	firekid	firekid	Atlantic Records	Theme Song for NASCAR GEICO 500
"Boomerang"	2015	firekid	firekid	Atlantic Records	
"Anna Lee"	2015	firekid	firekid	Atlantic Records	
"Getaway Car"	2015	firekid	firekid	Atlantic Records	
"Statues"	2015	firekid	firekid	Atlantic Records	
"Gospel"	2015	firekid	firekid	Atlantic Records	
"The World Is Mine"	2015	firekid	firekid	Atlantic Records	
"Circus Girl"	2011	Sherrié Austin	Circus Girl	Broken Bow Records	

== Featured artist credits ==
Single title	Year	Artist(s)	Album	Label
"A Friend Like You"	2021	Charity Daw, SQVARE	Noggin's Big Heart Beats	Nickelodeon
"Christmas Everyday"	2018	Band of Merrymakers (ft. Charity Daw)	"Christmas Everyday" (Single)	
"Have Yourself a Merry Little Christmas"	2017	Tito Nieves (ft. Charity Daw)	Navidad A Mi Estilo	
"Cuando, Cuando, Cuando"	2017	Tomasito Cruz (ft. Charity Daw)	Yo Soy Cuba	360 Group
