= What's My Name (Descendants song) =

Song from Descendants 2

Single by China Anne McClain, Thomas Doherty and Dylan Playfair

from the album Descendants 2
- Released: June 2, 2017
- Recorded: 2016
- Genre: Electropop; pop rap; pop
- Length: 3:10
- Label: Walt Disney
- Songwriters: Antonina Armato; Tim James; Tom Sturges; Dustin Clapier; Adam Schmalholz
- Producers: Rock Mafia; Armato; James

China Anne McClain singles chronology
"Calling All the Monsters" (2011)	"What's My Name" (2017)	"Stronger" (2018)

Descendants singles chronology
"Ways to Be Wicked" (2017)	"What's My Name" (2017)	"Stronger" (2018)

Music video
- "What's My Name" on YouTube

"What's My Name" is a song performed by China Anne McClain, Thomas Doherty, and Dylan Playfair that was released as a single on June 2, 2017, by Walt Disney Records. The song is featured in the musical fantasy television film Descendants 2.

== Live performances ==
On July 17, 2017, Dove Cameron, Sofia Carson, China Anne McClain, Cameron Boyce, Booboo Stewart, and Dianne Doan performed a mashup of "Ways to Be Wicked" and "What's My Name", both original songs from the movie musical on Good Morning America.

== Music video ==
The video was directed by Kenny Ortega and released on June 14, 2017.

== Charts ==
Chart (2017)	Peak position
Canada (Canadian Hot 100)	94
US Billboard Hot 100	61

== Certifications ==
Region	Certification	Certified units/sales
United Kingdom (BPI)	Silver	200,000^{‡}
United States (RIAA)	2× Platinum	2,000,000^{‡}
^{‡} Sales+streaming figures based on certification alone.

== Release history ==
Country	Date	Format	Label
United States	June 2, 2017	Digital download	Walt Disney

== Other versions and adaptations ==
In 2020, Kylie Cantrall performed a remix of the song for the television special Descendants Remix Dance Party.

A remix version for the film Descendants: The Rise of Red, under the title "What's My Name (Red Version)", was released on April 26, 2024, performed by China Anne McClain and Kylie Cantrall.
