= Chillin' Like a Villain =

Song in the Descendants 2 original soundtrack

Song by Sofia Carson, Cameron Boyce, Booboo Stewart and Mitchell Hope

from the album Descendants 2
- Released: May 9, 2017
- Recorded: 2016
- Genre: Pop
- Length: 3:13
- Label: Walt Disney
- Songwriters: Antonina Armato; Tim James; Tom Sturges; Adam Schmalholz
- Producers: Armato; James

Music video
- Chillin' Like a Villain on YouTube

"Chillin' Like a Villain" is a song from the 2017 Disney Channel television film Descendants 2. The music and lyrics were composed by Antonina Armato, Tim James, Tom Sturges, and Adam Schmalholz. The song was performed by the cast members Sofia Carson, Cameron Boyce, Booboo Stewart, and Mitchell Hope, in their vocal roles as Evie (daughter of the Evil Queen), Carlos (son of Cruella de Vil), Jay (son of Jafar), and Ben (son of Belle and Beast).

== Reception ==
"Chillin' Like a Villain" achieved commercial success, reaching number 95 on the Billboard Hot 100 chart. This feat reflects the song's popularity and the broad appeal of the Descendants franchise. The series, known for combining elements of fantasy and musical genres, has captivated a diverse audience of Disney fans. "Chillin' Like a Villain" stands out as a key musical number in the film, contributing to the overall narrative and entertainment value.

== Performance in the film ==
In the film, the song is performed as the characters try to teach Ben how to fit in with the villain kids from the Isle of the Lost. The upbeat tempo and catchy lyrics of the song convey the mischievous yet fun nature of the characters' backgrounds and their attempts to navigate their complex identities.

== Charts ==
| Chart (2017) | Peak position |
|---|---|
| US Billboard Hot 100 | 95 |
| US Kid Digital Songs (Billboard) | 2 |

== Certifications ==
| Region | Certification | Certified units/sales |
|---|---|---|
| United Kingdom (BPI) | Silver | 200,000^{‡} |
| United States (RIAA) | Platinum | 1,000,000^{‡} |
^{‡} Sales+streaming figures based on certification alone.

== Christmas version ==
"Chillin' Like a Snowman"

Single by Sofia Carson
- Released: December 1, 2017
- Recorded: 2017
- Genre: Pop; Christmas music
- Length: 2:29
- Label: Walt Disney
- Songwriters: Antonina Armato; Tim James; Tom Sturges; Adam Schmalholz

Descendants singles chronology
| "What's My Name" (2017) | "Chillin' Like a Snowman" (2017) | "Stronger" (2018) |

"Chillin' Like a Snowman" is a song performed by Sofia Carson. It was released on December 1, 2017 by Walt Disney Records. The song is the holiday version of "Chillin' Like a Villain" from Disney Channel's Descendants 2.

=== Track listing ===
- Digital download
1. "Chillin' Like a Snowman" — 2:29

=== Release history ===
| Country | Date | Format | Label |
|---|---|---|---|
| United States | December 1, 2017 | Digital download | Walt Disney |
