= Ways to Be Wicked =

Song from Descendants 2

Single by Dove Cameron, Sofia Carson, Cameron Boyce and Booboo Stewart

from the album Descendants 2
- Released: April 14, 2017
- Recorded: 2016
- Studio: Pop rock
- Length: 3:38
- Label: Walt Disney
- Songwriters: Sam Hollander; Josh Edmondson; Grant Michaels; Charity Daw
- Producers: Hollander; Edmondson

Descendants singles chronology
"Rotten to the Core" (2015)	"Ways to Be Wicked" (2017)	"What's My Name" (2017)

Music video
- "Ways to be Wicked" on YouTube

"Ways to Be Wicked" is a song performed by Dove Cameron, Sofia Carson, Cameron Boyce, and Booboo Stewart in their vocal roles as Mal, Evie, Carlos, and Jay from the Disney Channel Original Movie Descendants 2 (2017). The pop rock song originally debuted a day before on Radio Disney.

It premiered on Radio Disney and then was officially released as the Descendants 2 soundtrack's first single on April 14, 2017, by Walt Disney Records.

== Live performances ==
On May 1, 2017, Cameron, Boyce, Stewart and Carson, introduced the theme in the show Dancing with the Stars along with the song "Rotten to the Core" belonging to the first soundtrack. On July 17, the cast performed a mashup of "Ways to Be Wicked" and "What's My Name", both original songs from the movie musical on Good Morning America.

== Music video ==
The music video of "Ways to Be Wicked" was premiered on April 29, 2017 in the 2017 Radio Disney Music Awards in Microsoft Theater, Los Angeles. The video was directed by Kenny Ortega and released on April 30, 2017.

== Charts ==
Chart performance for "Ways to Be Wicked"
Chart (2017)	Peak position
US Bubbling Under Hot 100 (Billboard)	1

== Certifications ==
Certifications for "Ways to Be Wicked"
Region	Certification	Certified units/sales
Brazil (Pro-Música Brasil)	2× Platinum	120,000^{‡}
United Kingdom (BPI)	Silver	200,000^{‡}
United States (RIAA)	Platinum	1,000,000^{‡}
^{‡} Sales+streaming figures based on certification alone.
