= Josh Edmondson =

Josh Edmondson may refer to:

- Josh Edmondson (cyclist)
- Josh Edmondson (songwriter)
