= Thirst Project =

American non-profit organization

- Abbreviation: Thirst, TP (unofficially)
- Formation: 2008
- Founded at: Los Angeles, California, U.S.
- Type: Non-profit organization
- Legal status: Charity
- Headquarters: Los Angeles, California, U.S.
- Region served: Kingdom of eSwatini, Uganda, Kenya, El Salvador, India
- Founder: Seth Maxwell
- Key people: Seth Maxwell, Devon Jones, Evan Wesley, Luke Romick, Gina Mitzman, Emily Sagardia, Shaelle Etienne, Kristen de Guzman, Damon Brown, Sibusiso Shiba, Vincent Okeng, Luis Menjivar
- Website: thirstproject.org

The Thirst Project is a non-profit organization whose aim is to bring safe drinking water to communities around the world where it is not immediately available. The Thirst Project raises money and builds water, sanitation, and hygiene projects in communities that do not have immediate access to safe, clean drinking water. Actors Drake Bell, Ansel Elgort, Dylan O'Brien, Jennifer Lawrence and Chyler Leigh are supporters, as were Cameron Boyce and Naya Rivera before their deaths in 2019 and 2020. Boyce alone raised over $30,000 for Thirst Project, followed by another $15,000 raised in honor of Boyce in a fundraiser organized by Adam Sandler after Boyce's death by SUDEP.

== History ==
The organization was founded in 2008 in Los Angeles, by several college students who learned about the international water crisis and wanted to make a difference.

In 2012, Thirst Project pledged to bring clean water to the entire Kingdom of eSwatini by 2022.

While most of Thirst Project's efforts are focused in the Kingdom of eSwatini, they are also operating in India, Uganda, El Salvador and Kenya.

Thirst Project recently collaborated with Minerva Model United Nations founded by Arsh Arora and Yash Maheshwari. As of February 2021, Thirst Project had another collaboration, this time with Key Club International to encourage the drinking of 64 ounces of clean water each day. This collaboration was known as "Hydrate for 28."

== Statistics ==
According to Thirst Project's website as of February 22, 2021, almost 500,000 people have been served by the funds raised by the organization and the students it works with. Over $10 million have been raised for the 13 countries the group works in.

== Partners ==
Thirst Project donates 100% of general donations to end the water crisis. Their partners who pay their other expenses include:

- Kiwanis
- Morton Salt
- Lionsgate
- Follett
- Contiki
- Temple Hill Productions
- Paul Mitchell Schools
- 72andSunny
- Stance
- Not Vodka
- Genexa
- Andrew Gomez Dream Foundation
- 20th Century Fox
- DoSomething.org
- Vizio
- Apex Leadership Co.
- Tea Drops
- Eden
- Liquid Death
- MacKnight Food Group
- Zox
- Tender Greens
