= The Conrad Boys =

- DVD cover
- Directed by: Justin Lo
- Written by: Justin Lo
- Produced by: Justin Lo & Jose Ramirez
- Starring: Justin Lo, Nick Bartzen, Boo Boo Stewart, Barry Shay
- Production company: Newport Films
- Release date: April 24, 2006 (Newport Beach)
- Running time: 93 minutes
- Country: United States
- Language: English

The Conrad Boys is a 2006 American drama film starring Justin Lo, Nick Bartzen, Boo Boo Stewart and Barry Shay. The film was written and directed by Justin Lo. The film was produced by Justin Lo and Jose Ramirez.

== Cast ==
- Justin Lo as Charlie Conrad
- Booboo Stewart as Ben Conrad
- Nick Bartzen as Jordan Rivers
- Barry Shay as Doug Conrad
- Nancy Hancock as Tori Marshall
- Katelyn Ann Clark as Louise Denver
- Dorian Frankel as Evelyn Bridge
- Lauren Xerxes as Suzie Conrad
- Bruce Blauer as Vince Miller
- Shane Arenal as Andy Calhoun
- Bart Shattuck as Attorney Mark Poland
- Connie Schiro as Principal Brower
- Kari McDermott as Paula
- Keegan Bell as PJ
- Wesley Stiller as Keaton
- Scott Erickson as Rude Boy
- Ryan Walsh as College Guy
- Kristine Arnold as Party Girl
- Eduardo Ricketts Jr. as Motel Manager
- B. Anthony Cohen as Priest
- Michael Falls as Doctor
- Don Mack as English Professor

== Release ==
The Conrad Boys was released on April 24, 2006, at the Newport Beach International Film Festival and was released into the theaters in United States on June 6, 2006, and was released to DVD on August 15, 2006.

== See also ==
- List of lesbian, gay, bisexual, or transgender-related films by storyline
