= Love You Like That (film) =

2021 film

- Directed by: Eric C. Nash
- Written by: Eric C. Nash
- Produced by: Eric C. Nash; Patrick Kriz; Sean Gannon
- Starring: Allira Jaques; Mitchell Hope
- Cinematography: Robert Draper
- Edited by: Paul Black
- Music by: Mark Smythe
- Release date: 21 October 2021
- Running time: 104 minutes
- Country: Australia
- Language: English

Love You Like That is a 2021 Australian romantic comedy film written and directed by Eric C. Nash.

== Cast ==
- Mitchell Hope as Harrison
- Allira Jaques as Mim
- John Jarratt as Roy
- Chris Haywood as Gerard
- Steph Tisdell as Emily
- David Woodland as Dennis
- John Harding as Officer Mitch
- Jacob Barns as Officer Doug
- Barbara Hastings as Anne
- Anthony King as Dane
- John Paul Young as Self

== Reception ==
In FilmInk, Erin Free gave the film a rating of $16.50 (out of $20) and said it is "Sweet, positive and charming, this film is like a cinematic breath of fresh air, tapping into a real vein of joy and happiness." Writing in The Australian, David Stratton gave it 1 1/2 stars, calling it "an excessively bland affair". Jim Schembri on jimschembri.com gave it 1/2 a star. He writes "In the latest excruciating example of an Australian genre film that apparently has no idea what it is doing, Love You Like That is an embarrassing muddle of missed opportunities, story holes, wild shifts of tone, wince-worthy dialogue, thin performances and a premise that doesn’t start to cook until five minutes before the credits roll."
