= Four Green Steps =

- Founded: 2008
- Headquarters: Montreal, Quebec, Canada
- Area served: Worldwide
- Founders: Bill and Jaye Yarrow
- Industry: Education, Eco-friendly products, News
- Website: fourgreensteps.com

Four Green Steps is an internet environmental organization based in Montreal, Quebec. The organization was founded in 2008 by Jaye and Bill Yarrow. The business has been active for three years, but the official launch was held in October 2011. The organization consists of four sections: School Program, Community, Marketplace, and InfoZone. Four Green Steps contains information on various environmental topics such as green living, sustainable products, and corporate responsibility. The site also provides an environmental curriculum for various schools of different ages.... The organization celebrated 'Unsolicited Acts of Kindness Week' in August 2012, celebrating by donating used office equipment and pledging to plant a tree for anyone who does a good deed during Kindness Week.

== Services ==
=== School program ===
The Four Green Steps school program was developed in an effort to encourage a younger generation to become interested in environmental sustainability. The school program is a comprehensive, multipurpose initiative dedicated to raising awareness of, and providing solutions to shared environmental problems. The school program has a universal curriculum and activities for primary and secondary schools. The program features a curriculum of various assignments that will entice students to use their creativity and imagination, learn sustainable habits, take initiative, and develop a sense of environmental responsibility—all while fostering a sense of community and interaction among students the world over. The site also offers opportunities for students to share their projects and ideas online, as well as compete for prizes. The school program is offered free of charge and is available in five different languages: English, French, Spanish, Arabic, and Chinese. The curriculum's environmental focus includes the following subjects: Animals/Wildlife, Biodiversity, Climate Change/Weather, Conservation, Creative Arts, Ecology, Energy, Gardening/Composting, Habitats/Ecosystems, Litter, Nature Awareness, Plants, Pollution, Recycling/Waste Management, Sustainability, Team-building/Problem-solving, and Water. It was first launched in October 2009 and was used by 40 schools in 15 different countries that year. The program also host an environmental science fair and ‘one-day’ curriculum designed for substitutes or special events. The school program has engaged hundreds of schools in more than 55 countries worldwide.

=== Community ===
The Community section is made up of blogs, videos, events, and recipes related to the environment. The public can also contribute their own ideas. Four Green Steps was an official partner of the LA Green Festival Actor Booboo Stewart and sister Fivel Stewart joined the Four Green Steps team in 2011.

=== Marketplace ===
The organization sells products that are certified organic, fair-trade or are listed that they are produced in a more sustainable way. Products include clothing, food, furniture and household products. Four Green Steps launched their marketplace at the Los Angeles Green Festival in October 2011

=== InfoZone ===
The Infozone contains articles discussing environmental issues in various subject areas including science and technology, business and world news.

== Reception ==
Ethical products and services are becoming increasingly popular, especially in the United Kingdom where $12 billion in ethical products were sold in 2008.

As of August 10, 2010, there are schools in 72 different countries registered for Four Green Step’s School Programs. The School Program is also recognized by the New Zealand Ministry of Education., as well as the state of New Jersey

Four Green Steps collaborates with students at universities in Montreal, such as McGill University and Concordia University on environmental initiatives and research.

They are recognized by ECO Canada as an environmental organization.

Booboo Stewart of Twilight and his younger sister Fivel are both involved with Four Green Steps
