= Fool's Gold (Sofia Carson song) =

Single by Sofia Carson

from the album Sofia Carson
- Language: English
- Released: March 26, 2021
- Length: 2:21
- Label: Hollywood
- Composers: Stargate; Yakob
- Lyricists: Rachel Keen; Don Raye; Jeff Jones

Sofia Carson singles chronology
"Hold On to Me" (2020)	"Fool's Gold" (2021)	"He Loves Me, But..." (2021)

"Fool's Gold" is a song recorded by American singer and actress Sofia Carson. It was released as the lead single for her eponymous debut studio album on March 26, 2021, by Hollywood Records.

== Background and composition ==
The song is described as a "dance pop song with soulful funk guitar wraps around a pulsating bass line as her captivating voice sings a melody that embraces and transports you".

== Music video ==
The music video was released on the same day and was directed by film director Hannah Lux Davis and explores fire concept, Carson explained that her and the director used the theme to tell a history that is so personal to the singer stating that

“The visual story is all about fire as you guys saw in the video because she’s in a way metaphorically playing with fire in the game of love. The story that I’m telling is so personal, and we kind of created the narrative together. We used the theme of fire in a really fun way to portray a girl who is really fiery within and knows what she wants, but at the same time is also kind of, metaphorically playing with fire."

== Credits ==
Adapted by AllMusic

- Sofia Carson – vocals
- Trondheim Soloists – strings
- Stargate – producer
- Yakob – producer
- Caleb Hulin – engineer
- Kevin KD Davis – mixing
- Mikkel Storleer Eriksen – programming
- Tor Erik Hermansen – programming
- Jakob Rabitsch – programming
- Jeff Jones – programming
- Anders Larsen – recording, arranger

== Charts ==
Chart performance for Fool's Gold
Chart (2021)	Peak position
US Billboard Pop Airplay	34
