= Mitchell Hope =

Australian actor

- Born: 27 June 1994 (age 32); Melbourne, Victoria, Australia
- Occupation: Actor
- Years active: 2012–present
- Notable work: Descendants

Mitchell Hope (born 27 June 1994) is an Australian actor. He is best known for his role as Ben in the first three movies of the Descendants franchise and voiced the character in animated productions. He also starred in the 2021 Australian comedy film Love You Like That, and was part of the ensemble cast of Let It Snow.

== Personal life ==
Hope was born in Melbourne, Australia, and has two younger brothers. Hope is also a childhood classmate and friend of BTS member Jin after the two met in 2007.

== Career ==
Hope had his first television role on the 2014 Australian miniseries INXS: Never Tear Us Apart, a biopic about the rock band INXS. Hope portrayed the younger version of keyboardist and main composer of the band, Andrew Farriss.

From 2015 to 2021, Hope portrayed Ben Florian in the Disney Channel franchise musical films Descendants. His character is the son of King Adam and Queen Belle of Beauty and the Beast and serves as the love interest to Maleficent's daughter, Mal. He stars alongside Dove Cameron, Sofia Carson, Booboo Stewart, and Cameron Boyce. The series proved to be a huge success, with the original trilogy accumulating over 781 million hours of viewing in the United States. Each film was also the most-watched television movie of the year during its premiere in 2015, 2017, and 2019. There has also been a number of spin-offs, animations, and live musical tours. Hope appears 2021 animated short Descendants: The Royal Wedding about Ben and Mal's wedding. He is also featured on the soundtracks of each of the films, with every album reaching the Billboard Top 200 charts.

In 2019 Hope co-starred in Netflix's Christmas romantic comedy film Let It Snow as Tobin. He starred alongside Isabela Merced, Shameik Moore, Odeya Rush, Liv Hewson, and his love interest Kiernan Shipka. The film received good reviews, with a 85% critics approval rating on Rotten Tomatoes. He followed this up by starring in the 2021 Australian romantic comedy Love You Like Thatand a small role in the road trip film Don't Make Me Go.

In 2026 Hope starred in 2026 survival thriller film Killer Whale as Josh, alongside Virginia Gardner and Mel Jarnson.

== Discography ==
=== Soundtrack performances ===
Year	Title	Soundtrack album	Ref.
2015	"Did I Mention"	Descendants	
2015	"Be Our Guest"	Descendants	
2015	"Set it Off"	Descendants	
2017	"Chillin' Like a Villian"	Descendants 2	
2017	"It's Goin' Down"	Descendants 2	
2017	"You and Me"	Descendants 2	
2019	"Break This Down"	Descendants 3	
2019	"Did I Mention"	Descendants 3	

== Filmography ==
=== Film ===
Year	Title	Role	Notes
2006	Earth's Last Remnants	Amir	Short film
2012	Yes Mum	Jonno	Short film
2012	Down the Way	Ryan	Short film
2019	Let It Snow	Tobin	
2021	Love You Like That	Harrison	
2022	Don't Make Me Go	Rusty	
2026	Killer Whale	Josh	

=== Television ===
Year	Title	Role	Notes
2014	INXS: Never Tear Us Apart	Tim Farriss (young)	Television film
2015	Descendants	Prince Ben	Television film
2015–2017	Descendants: Wicked World	King Ben	Voice role
2017	Descendants 2	King Ben	Television film
2019	Descendants 3	King Ben	Television film
2021	Descendants: The Royal Wedding	King Ben	Voice role; TV special
