= Descendants (2015 film) =

Disney Channel Original Movie

- Promotional poster
- Genre: Musical fantasy
- Written by: Josann McGibbon; Sara Parriott
- Directed by: Kenny Ortega
- Starring: Dove Cameron; Cameron Boyce; Booboo Stewart; Sofia Carson
- Composer: David Lawrence
- Country of origin: United States
- Original language: English

Production
- Executive producers: Wendy Japhet; Kenny Ortega
- Cinematography: Thomas Burstyn
- Editor: Don Brochu
- Running time: 112 minutes
- Production companies: Bad Angels Productions; 5678 Productions; Disney Channel Original Productions

Original release
- Network: Disney Channel
- Release: July 31, 2015

Related
- Descendants: School of Secrets; Descendants: Wicked World

Descendants is a 2015 American musical fantasy television film directed and choreographed by Kenny Ortega and written by the writing team of Josann McGibbon and Sara Parriott. It stars Dove Cameron, Sofia Carson, Booboo Stewart, and Cameron Boyce as the teenage children of Maleficent, the Evil Queen, Jafar, and Cruella de Vil, respectively. The film is about the teenagers adjusting to life outside their island prison, while on a mission to steal the Fairy Godmother's wand and free their parents from captivity. It debuted on July 31, 2015, as a Disney Channel Original Movie, to positive reviews and 6.6 million viewers.

The film also stars Mitchell Hope, Melanie Paxson, Brenna D'Amico, Sarah Jeffery, Zachary Gibson, Jedidiah Goodacre, Dianne Doan, Dan Payne, Keegan Connor Tracy, Wendy Raquel Robinson, Maz Jobrani, Kathy Najimy, and Kristin Chenoweth.

The first installment in the Descendants franchise, Descendants was spun off into several television series, short films, and television specials, including an animated short-form series titled Descendants: Wicked World. It was followed by a sequel, Descendants 2, which premiered on July 21, 2017, a third film, Descendants 3, which premiered on August 2, 2019, a fourth film, Descendants: The Rise of Red, which premiered on July 12, 2024 on Disney+. and a fifth film, Descendants: Wicked Wonderland, which premiered on July 16, 2026 on Disney Channel then on the next day on Disney+.

== Plot ==
Belle and Beast have married and become king and queen. After the United States of Auradon was established, they have created a prosperous nation from the surrounding kingdoms. Villains and their children are banished to the Isle of the Lost, an island slum surrounded by a barrier where magic is suspended.

Their son Ben will soon be crowned king, and announces he will give four children selected from the Isle of the Lost a chance to attend Auradon Preparatory away from the influence of their villainous parents. He chooses Carlos, son of Cruella de Vil; Jay, son of Jafar; Evie, daughter of the Evil Queen; and Mal, daughter of Maleficent. Maleficent secretly instructs the four of them to steal the Fairy Godmother's magic wand to release the barrier so she can take over Auradon.

The four meet Ben and his girlfriend Audrey, daughter of Princess Aurora. The Fairy Godmother is the school's headmistress. Evie uses her mother's pocket-sized magic mirror to locate the wand in a nearby museum, and Mal uses her mother's spinning wheel from the museum to put the security guard to sleep. But they fail retrieving the wand due to a barrier blocking the wand and setting off a siren.

After learning that the Fairy Godmother will use the wand at Ben's coronation, the four wait it out by attending classes. Jay is recruited into the school's "tourney" team (a sport similar to field hockey, hurling and lacrosse). Carlos overcomes his fear of dogs by befriending the school's dog, Dude. Though intelligent, Evie acts vain to impress Chad, Cinderella's son; she ends up doing his homework for him. Dopey's son, Doug, encourages her not to pander to others and be herself.

Mal becomes popular, using Maleficent's spell book to alter Jane and Lonnie's hair, the daughters of the Fairy Godmother and Mulan respectively. Jane in particular dislikes her looks, especially because her mother will not use her own magic to change them. Mal learns that Ben's girlfriend will be seated close to the wand during the coronation, which is used during the ceremony. She bakes a cookie laced with a love potion and gives it to Ben, who falls madly in love with her, much to the shock of his friends, particularly Audrey.

On a date with Ben, Mal becomes conflicted with her growing inner goodness and desire to please her mother, unsure of how to react to Ben's feelings towards her. During the school's family day, the villains' children are ostracized after an encounter with Audrey's grandmother, Queen Leah. She hates Mal because Maleficent's curse was the reason she missed Aurora's childhood, prompting an argument that drives Mal to end the beauty spell she used on Jane. Ben tries to reassure them that everything will be okay after the coronation. Doug tries to remain friendly towards Evie, but Chad forces him to distance himself from her. At Ben's coronation, Mal gives him a brownie containing the love spell's antidote, believing it is unnecessary to keep him under the spell. It turns out, per Ben's admission, that he was already freed of the spell since their date when he went swimming in the Enchanted Lake, believing that Mal only did it because she really liked him. However, much to Mal's surprise, it turns out Ben has had feelings for her all along.

During Ben's crowning, a disillusioned Jane grabs the wand from her mother, wanting to improve her beauty, only for her to accidentally damage the Isle's barrier. Mal takes the wand from Jane, but torn over what to do, is encouraged by Ben to make her own choice rather than follow Maleficent's path. She recognizes that she and her friends have found happiness in Auradon and they choose to be good. Maleficent crashes the coronation ceremony, freezing everyone except Mal, Evie, Jay and Carlos. When they defy her, Maleficent transforms into a dragon. Mal and her friends use a counterspell, turning Maleficent into a lizard, her tiny size based on the amount of love in her heart.

Mal returns the Fairy Godmother's wand to her. The Fairy Godmother unfreezes everyone and Mal tells her not to be too hard on Jane. While the villains watch the celebration from afar, Auradon Prep's students party through the night. Mal's eyes turn green as she addresses the audience, telling them the story is not over yet.

== Cast ==
- Dove Cameron as Mal, daughter of Maleficent
- Cameron Boyce as Carlos, son of Cruella de Vil
- Booboo Stewart as Jay, son of Jafar
- Sofia Carson as Evie, daughter of Evil Queen
- Mitchell Hope as Ben, son of Queen Belle and Beast
- Melanie Paxson as Fairy Godmother from Cinderella, the headmistress of Auradon Prep and Jane's mother
- Brenna D'Amico as Jane, daughter of Fairy Godmother
- Sarah Jeffery as Audrey, daughter of Aurora and Prince Phillip
- Zachary Gibson as Doug, son of Dopey
- Jedidiah Goodacre as Chad Charming, son of Cinderella and Prince Charming
- Dianne Doan as Lonnie, daughter of Fa Mulan and Li Shang
- Dan Payne as King Beast from Beauty and the Beast, king of Auradon and Ben's father
- Keegan Connor Tracy as Queen Belle from Beauty and the Beast, queen of Auradon and Ben's mother
- Wendy Raquel Robinson as Cruella de Vil from One Hundred and One Dalmatians, Carlos' mother
- Maz Jobrani as Jafar from Aladdin, Jay's father who owns his own junk shop
- Kathy Najimy as Evil Queen from Snow White and the Seven Dwarfs, Evie's mother who still has issues with her stepdaughter, Snow White
- Kristin Chenoweth as Maleficent from Sleeping Beauty, Mal's mother who is known as the most revered and cruelest villain in Auradon

Additionally, Judith Maxie portrays Queen Leah, Audrey's grandmother, Reese Alexander plays Coach Jenkins, the coach at Auradon Prep, Jonathan Holmes portrays Mr. Deley, the science teacher at Auradon Prep, and Stephanie Bennett has the role of Snow White, who works as a television reporter.

== Production ==
On December 12, 2013, Disney Channel announced the production of the film and released the plot outline. Kenny Ortega, a director who had previously worked with Disney Channel on the High School Musical trilogy, was announced to be directing the film. The script was written by Josann McGibbon and Sara Parriott. Filming began in the spring of 2014. Filming took place in Vancouver and in locations including Hatley Castle and the British Columbia Parliament Buildings in Victoria, British Columbia. The costumes were designed by Kara Saun.

== Broadcast ==
Descendants made its debut on Family Channel in Canada on July 31, 2015, simultaneously with the United States. It was also the last Disney Channel Original Movie to air in Canada on Family after the launch of a Disney Channel there. The film premiered on August 1, 2015 on Disney Channel in Australia and New Zealand and on September 25, 2015 on Disney Channel in the United Kingdom and Ireland. In the Middle East and Africa, the film premiered on September 18, 2015 on the English feed of Disney Channel. It premiered in Turkey on October 17, 2015 on Disney Channel.

== Home media ==
Descendants was released on DVD on July 31, 2015. It was the fifth-best-selling home-video release of August. By the end of 2015, the physical release had grossed about $11.5 million.

== Reception ==
=== Critical reception ===
Descendants received positive reviews from critics. Isabella Biedenharn of Entertainment Weekly gave the film a "B" grade, saying that "plot isn't really the point. The fun is in the roll call... It's no High School Musical, but the songs are catchy, and the junior villains are worth rooting for." Tisha Mae Eaton of Moviepilot.com said, "It's a movie that definitely had the feel of a Disney classic with a modern twist and I highly recommend it." Alex Reif of LaughingPlace.com gave it a score of 4.5 out of 5, saying, "I highly recommend this to any Disney fan, if for no other reason than to see what they've done with the characters, the Hocus Pocus references, and Kristin Chenoweth's Maleficent which is closer to the animated character than Angelina Jolie's portrayal." Brian Lowry of Variety called it "a playful and tuneful TV movie, exhibiting much higher ambitions than, say, the Teen Beach franchise." By contrast, Amy Amatangelo of The Hollywood Reporter gave it a mixed review, calling it "High School Musical meets Once Upon a Time. It smartly ushers little girls who have grown up watching Disney movies into the tween audience and is an idea so ripe for merchandising that the Disney Store is already chock-full of Descendants costumes, dolls and T-shirts." She called the story "flimsy", but applauded the performances of Chenoweth, Najimy, Robinson, and Jobrani.

On the review aggregator website Rotten Tomatoes, 90% of 10 critics' reviews are positive, with an average rating of 7.67/10. The website's critical consensus reads, "Memorable songs and excellent casting help turn Descendants into a decidedly wicked musical romp." Metacritic, which uses a weighted average, assigned the film a score of 63 out of 100, based on 5 critics, indicating "generally favorable" reviews.

=== Ratings ===
Before the film made its TV debut, it was viewed more than one million times on the Watch Disney Channel app. It was viewed by 6.6 million people on its premiere night and 10.5 million viewers in Early DVR Playback. Shortly after the premier air date, ratings showed the film was the fifth most watched original movie in cable history.

In Australia, the film attracted 151,000 viewers, making it the sixth highest-rated broadcast on pay television on its premiere day. The British premiere was watched by 827,000 viewers, making it the most-watched broadcast on Disney Channel of that week and month. The viewers rose to 1.45 million in 28 days, making it the highest viewership ever on the network.

=== Accolades ===
Year	Award	Category	Recipients	Result	Ref.
2015	Teen Choice Awards	Choice Movie TV Song	Shawn Mendes – "Believe"	Nominated	
2016	Writers Guild of America Award	Children's Longform Program	Josann McGibbon and Sara Parriott	Won	
2016	Directors Guild of America Award	Outstanding Directorial Achievement in a Children's Program	Kenny Ortega	Won	
2016	Golden Reel Awards	Sound Editing In Television - Musical: Long Form	Amber Funk	Nominated	
2016	68th Primetime Emmy Awards	Outstanding Music Composition For A Limited Series, Movie Or Special (Original Dramatic Score)	David Lawrence	Nominated	

== Franchise ==
=== Sequels ===
During the 2015 D23 Expo, Disney announced that a sequel to Descendants had been ordered. The news was made official on the Disney Channel Facebook page on October 15, 2015. Deadline reported that Parriott and McGibbon would reprise their duties as screenwriters and executive producers and that all of the cast from the first film was expected to return. On June 10, 2016, it was announced that China Anne McClain would join the sequel as Ursula's daughter, Uma.

On February 16, 2018, Disney Channel announced a third film in the series, Descendants 3, which premiered on August 2, 2019.

=== Prequel spin-off ===
Before the film's premiere air date, Disney Channel announced a live action mini series leading up to the event. Every day leading up to the release of the film, a new episode of Descendants: School of Secrets would be released revealing more secrets about the students at Auradon Prep. Each episode of the series is under 5 minutes long, with 23 episodes in total.

=== Animated spin-off ===
Right after the film finished airing on Disney Channel, it was announced that an animated short spinoff titled Descendants: Wicked World would be released on September 18, 2015. Furthermore, former Phineas and Ferb storyboard artist Aliki Theofilopoulos Grafft announced on Twitter that she was directing the series, with Jenni Cook as producer, and that the original cast would be reprising their roles.

=== Television special ===
Disney Channel announced a television special titled Descendants: The Royal Wedding which premiered on August 13, 2021.

== Soundtrack ==
Descendants is a soundtrack album by the cast of Descendants, released on July 31, 2015 by Walt Disney Records. The soundtrack peaked at No. 1 in United States at Billboard 200, No. 1 on the US Top Digital Albums and topped the US Top Soundtracks.
