= Thomas Doherty (actor) =

Scottish actor & singer (born 1995)

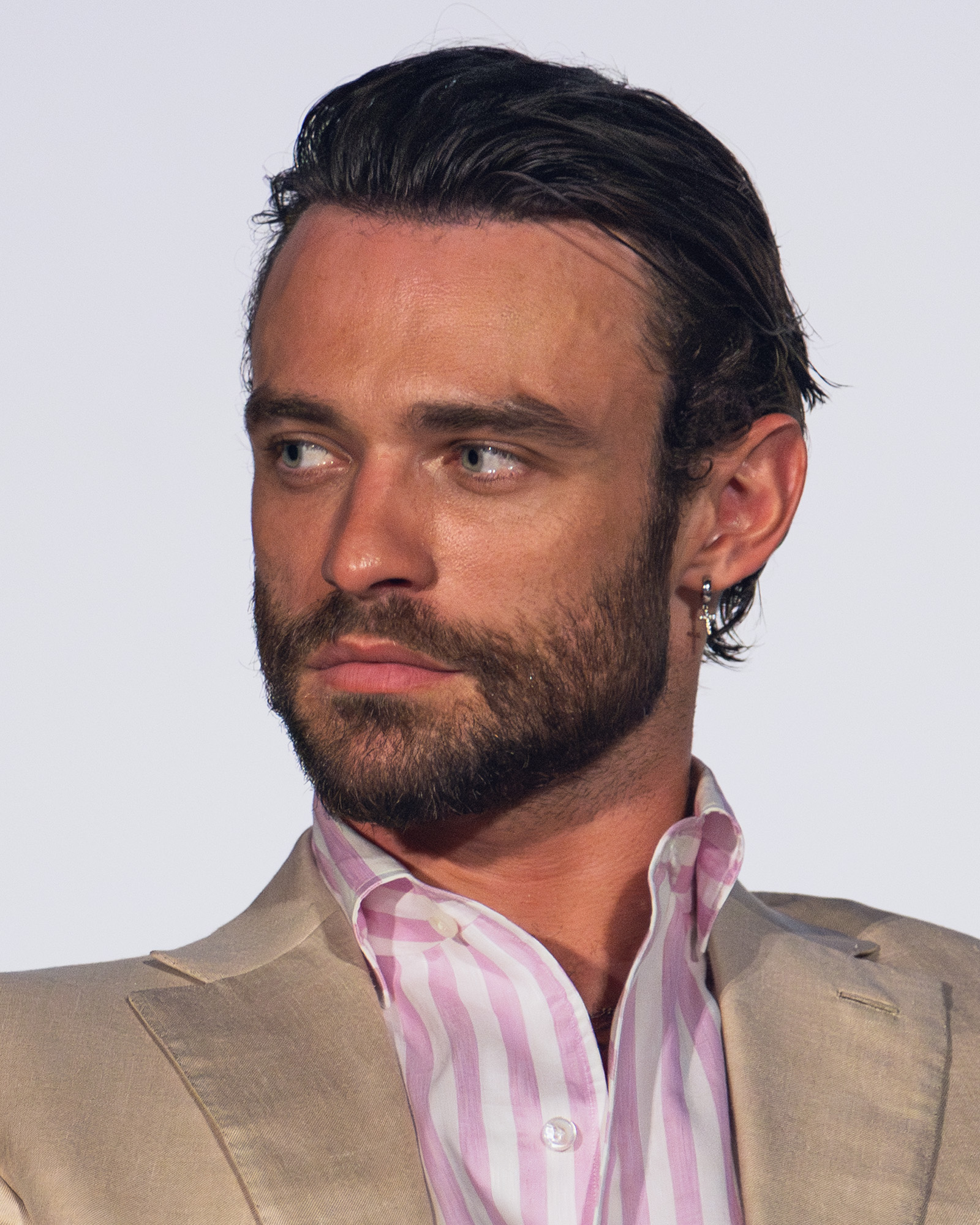
- Doherty in 2026
- Born: Thomas Anthony Doherty; 21 April 1995 (age 31); Edinburgh, Scotland
- Education: Royal High School, Edinburgh
- Occupations: Actor; singer
- Years active: 2013–present

Thomas Anthony Doherty (born 21 April 1995) is a Scottish actor and singer from Edinburgh. He played Sean Matthews on the Disney Channel musical series The Lodge, Harry Hook in the Descendants film franchise, Max Wolfe in the HBO Max reboot of Gossip Girl, and Walter De Ville in the 2022 film The Invitation.

From September to December 2025, he joined the cast of the Off-Broadway stage musical Little Shop of Horrors starring as Seymour.

== Early life ==
Doherty was born in Edinburgh on 21 April 1995, and grew up in the city. He has an older brother and younger sister, and his parents were both in the banking business. He attended Royal High School in Edinburgh.

After high school, Doherty entered The MGA Academy of Performing Arts in Edinburgh, where he studied musical theatre. He graduated in July 2015 and signed a contract with Olivia Bell Management in London.

== Career ==
After his 2015 graduation, Doherty waited tables in Edinburgh at Tigerlilly restaurant. On his days off, Doherty split his time between auditioning for Disney Channel's The Lodge and working with the Edinburgh Fringe. He was offered the role of Sean Matthews in The Lodge, and had to undergo intensive training in mountain biking to prepare for the role. The Lodge was filmed in Belfast, Northern Ireland. He stated that he was able to play the character as a Scot, but he toned down his accent in order to better accommodate the viewers in all 108 countries that The Lodge aired in. In December 2016, The Lodge was renewed for a second series which began production in February 2017.

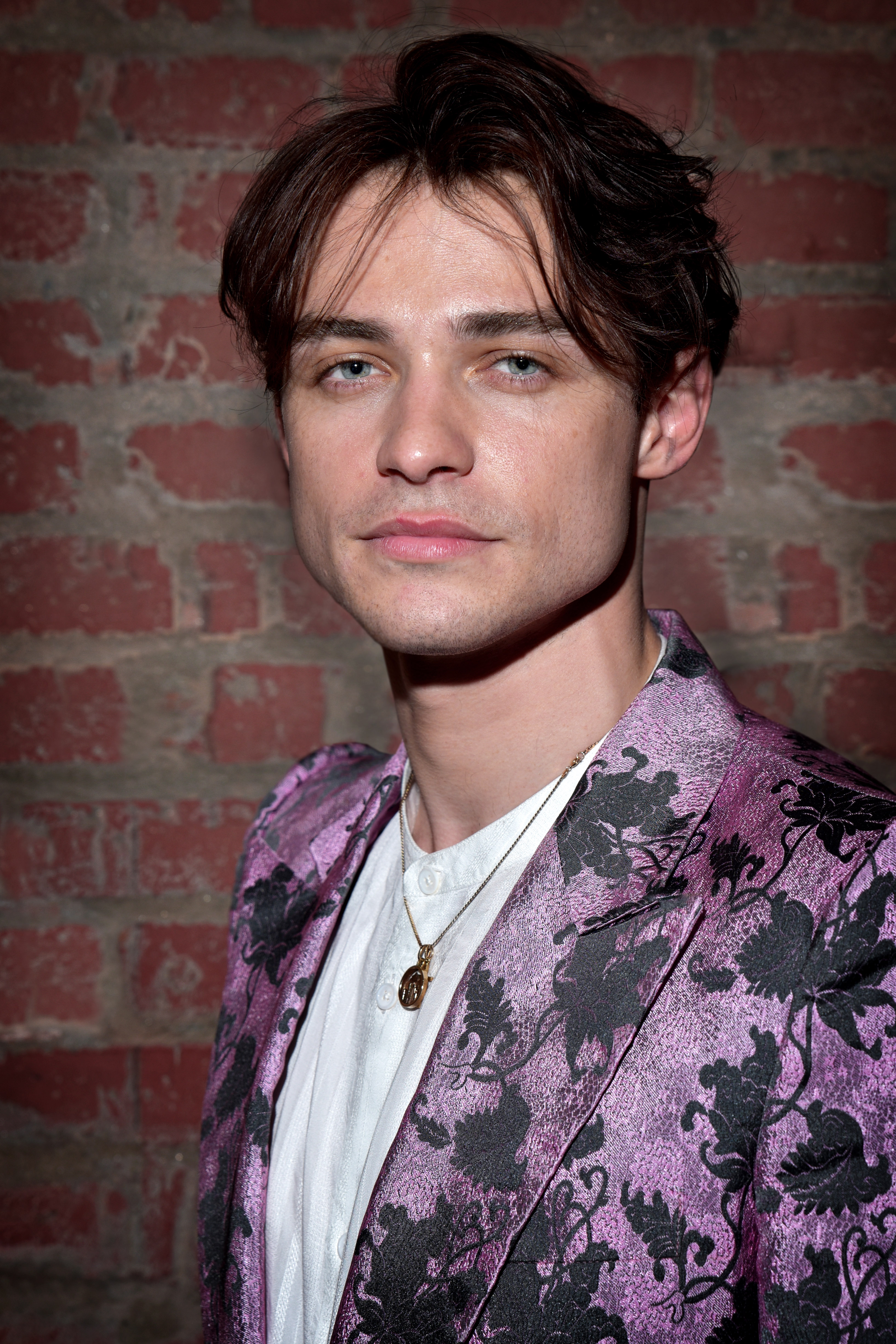
Doherty in 2019

In 2016, Doherty auditioned for Descendants 2 and was cast as Harry Hook, the son of villain Captain James Hook from Peter Pan. Descendants 2 was filmed in Vancouver, Canada, in 2016 and aired on Disney Channel on 21 July 2017. He reprised his role as Harry Hook in the third installment of the Disney Channel franchise, Descendants 3 which premiered in 2019. In August 2017, Doherty was named one of "The 50 Fittest Boys of 2017" by Vogue magazine.

From 2019 to 2020, he appeared in the CW series Legacies as Sebastian.

In 2021, Doherty began starring in the HBO Max teen drama Gossip Girl. The following year, he starred alongside Nathalie Emmanuel in the supernatural horror film The Invitation.

On September 5, 2025, he made his New York stage debut in the Off-Broadway revival of Little Shop of Horrors as Seymour Krelborn opposite Madeline Brewer as Audrey.

== Personal life ==
From 2017 to 2020, Doherty was in a relationship with his Descendants 2 co-star Dove Cameron.

Doherty credits his experience in Gossip Girl as "educational" as it "challenged [his] own preconceived notions and indoctrination of 'this is who you love, this is what you do, everything else is wrong.'" In an interview with Variety, Doherty declared that, while he has only been in heterosexual relationships, he has always seen sexuality as a spectrum and does not believe in labels.

== Filmography ==
=== Film ===
Year	Title	Role	Notes
2016	Lord of the Dance	Neil Tucker	Short film
2018	High Strung: Free Dance	Zander	
2022	The Invitation	Walter De Ville	
2024	Dandelion	Casey	

=== Television ===
Year	Title	Role	Notes
2013	Dracula	Street Boy	Episode: "Servant to Two Masters"
2016–2017	The Lodge	Sean Matthews	Main role
2017	Descendants 2	Harry Hook	Television film
2018	Under the Sea: A Descendants Short Story	Harry Hook	Short film
2018–2019	High Strung Free Dance	Zander Raines	Main role
2019	Catherine the Great	Peter Zavadovsky	Guest role; 3 episodes
2019	Descendants 3	Harry Hook	Television film
2019–2020	Legacies	Sebastian	Recurring role (season 2)
2020	High Fidelity	Liam Shawcross	3 episodes
2021–2023	Gossip Girl	Max Wolfe	Main role
2024	Girls5eva	Gray Holland	Recurring role; 3 episodes
2024–present	Tell Me Lies	Leo	Recurring role (season 2–present)
2026	Paradise	Link (Dylan)	Recurring role (season 2)

=== Theatre ===
Year	Title	Role	Notes
2025	Little Shop of Horrors	Seymour Krelborn	Off-Broadway revival

=== Audio ===
Year	Title	Role	Notes
2022	The Inventor's Apprentice	Horatio Godkin	Main role
