= Tom Sturges =

American music executive

- Born: June 22, 1956 (age 70); Paris, France
- Education: University of California, Los Angeles and University of California, Davis
- Occupations: Music executive, author
- Relatives: Preston Sturges (father); Anne Margaret "Sandy" Nagle (mother); Shannon Sturges (niece)

Tom Sturges (born June 22, 1956) is an American music executive, teacher, speaker, and author.

== Early life ==
Born in France, Sturges is one of only seven Americans baptized at Cathédrale Notre-Dame de Paris. Sturges is the third son of Preston Sturges, the Hollywood screenwriter and director who died when Tom was three years old, and Anne Margaret "Sandy" Nagle (1927-2006). Sturges studied music at the University of California, Davis and the University of California, Los Angeles in the late 1970s. At age 14, Tom sued his mother for the right to his own custody and won the case, a first time in favor of a minor.

== Music career ==
Sturges began his career in the music industry at Clive Davis' Arista Music Publishing, where after interning and taking an opening-level position, he spent three years as a creative executive. In the two years following, Tom worked at Screen Gems Music/ EMI Music with Carole King, Gerry Goffin, and Katrina & The Waves.

In 1985, Sturges became vice president at the company, and in 1989, assumed the role as president of the Chrysalis Music Group, where he signed artists including Smashing Pumpkins, Goodie Mob, OutKast, Green Jelly, Slaughter, songwriters Antonina Armato, and Kipper Jones. At Chrysalis, he also pitched songs that became charting hits for artists including Aretha Franklin, Cher, Mariah Carey, Celine Dion, George Michael, and Whitney Houston.

After Chrysalis, he was president and general manager of Shaquille O'Neal’s imprint, Twism Records. He then became executive vice president and head of creative for Universal Music Publishing Group. While at Universal, he signed artists 3 Doors Down, 50 Cent, Foo Fighters, Stone Temple Pilots, Jack Johnson, Owl City, Vanessa Carlton, Afroman, and Chris Brown, as well as writer/producers Mark Batson and Sean Garrett. Sturges was fired from the company in 2011. He then joined the advisory board for the Clive Davis Institute of Recorded Music. For over ten years Sturges has taught at UCLA, where he co-created the class “Music Business Now” with Jeff Jampol and Lenny Beer.

== Writing and production ==
During the 1980s, Sturges had 12 of his father’s screenplays published by the University of California Press to preserve them, and began shopping his father’s unproduced screenplays. Tom is editing a volume of his father’s letters, and also working with author Donald Spoto on one of his father’s seven biographies. He also is editing several of his father’s scripts produced for the screen and stage, such as the play "A Cup of Coffee" produced by Marlene Swartz.

Sturges is also the author of the parenting books Parking Lot Rules & 75 Other Ideas for Raising Amazing Children, “Grow the Tree You Got: & 99 Other Ideas for Raising Amazing Adolescents and Teenagers,” and “Every Idea Is A Good Idea: Be Creative Anytime, Anywhere” He is also a contributor for the Huffington Post and has appeared on CNN, KTLA, Fox & Friends and the Today Show. In 2013, Tom was a speaker at both the Aspen Challenge and Aspen Ideas Festival. His contributions have been featured in publications including Best Life magazine, Fast Company, People, and The New York Times.

== Philanthropy ==
Sturges has been a volunteer teacher at Grandview Elementary School in Manhattan Beach, and at the Foshay Learning Center in South Los Angeles. Sturges has received over 42 commendations for his volunteerism. His philanthropy was the subject of the film Witness to a Dream, which followed his mentoring of students in the program from grade school through their entry into college. An album complementing the film was later released which featured the collective works of Tom’s mentees from 1997-2003.
