= Descendants 2 =

2017 Disney Channel Original Movie directed by Kenny Ortega

- Promotional poster
- Genre: Musical fantasy
- Written by: Josann McGibbon; Sara Parriott
- Directed by: Kenny Ortega
- Starring: Dove Cameron; Cameron Boyce; Sofia Carson; Booboo Stewart; China Anne McClain
- Composer: David Lawrence
- Country of origin: United States
- Original language: English

Production
- Executive producers: Wendy Japhet; Josann McGibbon; Sara Parriott; Kenny Ortega
- Cinematography: Mark Irwin
- Editor: Don Brochu
- Running time: 111 minutes
- Production companies: Bad Angels Productions; 5678 Productions; Disney Channel Original Productions
- Budget: $12 million

Original release
- Network: Disney Channel; Disney XD; Lifetime; Lifetime Movies; Freeform; ABC
- Release: July 21, 2017

Descendants 2 is an American musical fantasy television film written by Josann McGibbon and Sara Parriott and directed by Kenny Ortega. It is a sequel to Descendants (2015), and the second installment in the Descendants franchise. The film stars Dove Cameron, Cameron Boyce, Sofia Carson, Booboo Stewart, Mitchell Hope, and China Anne McClain.

It premiered as a Disney Channel Original Movie on July 21, 2017, and was simulcast on Disney-owned networks ABC, Disney XD, Freeform, Lifetime, and Lifetime Movies. It was followed by a third film, Descendants 3, which premiered on August 2, 2019.

== Plot ==
Mal struggles with her new celebrity life as the girlfriend of King Ben, putting a spell on her hair making it blonde, and having to maintain an uncomfortable princess-like personality everywhere she goes. She confides her issues in her friends Evie, Carlos, and Jay, but they are content with their new lives in Auradon.

Evie scolds Mal for relying on her mother's spell book to solve her issues. Carlos, wishing to ask Jane to the upcoming Cotillion dance, turns to Mal for help. She gives him a sweet that will make him speak the truth, but his dog, Dude, eats it, magically speaking the blunt truth in English.

Ben eventually discovers Mal's reliance on magic, and she comes clean about her insecurities, causing a falling-out. Mal returns to the Isle of the Lost, now ruled by her former rival Uma, Ursula's daughter, along with Harry and Gil, the sons of Captain Hook and Gaston. Mal visits hairstylist Dizzy Tremaine, Drizella's daughter, who restores her signature purple hair and adds some bangs. Harry learns of Mal's return and informs Uma.

Ben, Evie, Jay, and Carlos learn of Mal's departure so sneak onto the Isle to find her, but Gil recognizes them. Ben confronts Mal, who rejects his feelings for both his sake and Auradon's. He leaves dejected, only to be captured by Uma. Mal and Uma arm wrestle for Ben and Fairy Godmother's wand, which Uma wins. Uma then orders Mal and her friends to retrieve the Fairy Godmother's wand in exchange for Ben's safe return.

Carlos and Jay return to Auradon Prep, where they create a replica of the wand using a 3D printer. They are caught by Lonnie, Mulan's daughter, who blackmails them into letting her come, having previously been rejected by Jay's sports team based on her gender.

Uma tells Ben of her bitterness that she and the others were not chosen to go to Auradon. He takes this into account and invites her to Auradon, but she instead plots to make her own way there. Mal's group returns, handing over the fake wand in exchange for Ben, but Uma discovers the forgery.

The group flee back to Auradon, but Mal and Ben's relationship is still rocky. The villains' children come to terms with the fact that they cannot run from their pasts and agree to be honest with themselves and each other. Carlos confesses to Jane but struggles, while Jay appoints Lonnie as the captain of his team.

Aboard a ship during the Cotillion, Ben stuns everyone by appearing with Uma, who he declares as his true love and announces he will destroy the barrier on the Isle. Jane quickly unveils a stained glass display Ben commissioned to show his affection for Mal, who realizes he loved her for who she was all along.

Suspecting Uma has given him a love potion, Mal confesses her love for Ben and kisses him, breaking the spell. Enraged, Uma leaps into the water using Ursula's magic seashell necklace to transform into a sea monster, with her legs as tentacles, and Mal fights back as a dragon. Ben jumps into the water and intervenes, quelling the battle, and Uma returns the ring that Ben had originally given her when he had declared her as his true love and leaves. Mal and Ben reunite, Mal surrendering her spell book to Fairy Godmother. Evie requests that Dizzy be allowed to attend Auradon Prep; when Dizzy is offered, she excitedly accepts.

In a mid-credits scene, Uma addresses the audience, promising that the story is not over.

== Cast ==
- Dove Cameron as Mal, daughter of Maleficent
- Cameron Boyce as Carlos, son of Cruella de Vil
- Sofia Carson as Evie, daughter of The Evil Queen
- Booboo Stewart as Jay, son of Jafar
- Mitchell Hope as Ben, son of Belle and Beast
- Brenna D'Amico as Jane, daughter of the Fairy Godmother
- Melanie Paxson as the Fairy Godmother, the headmistress of Auradon Prep and Jane's mother
- Bobby Moynihan as the voice of Dude, Carlos' dog who gains the power of speech.
- Thomas Doherty as Harry Hook, son of Captain Hook
- Dylan Playfair as Gil, son of Gaston
- Dianne Doan as Lonnie, daughter of Fa Mulan and Li Shang
- Jedidiah Goodacre as Chad Charming, son of Cinderella and Prince Charming
- Zachary Gibson as Doug, son of Dopey
- Anna Cathcart as Dizzy Tremaine, daughter of Drizella Tremaine and granddaughter of Lady Tremaine
- Dan Payne as the Beast, Queen Belle's husband and Ben's father
- Keegan Connor Tracy as Belle, Beast's wife and Ben's mother
- China Anne McClain as Uma, daughter of Ursula

== Production ==
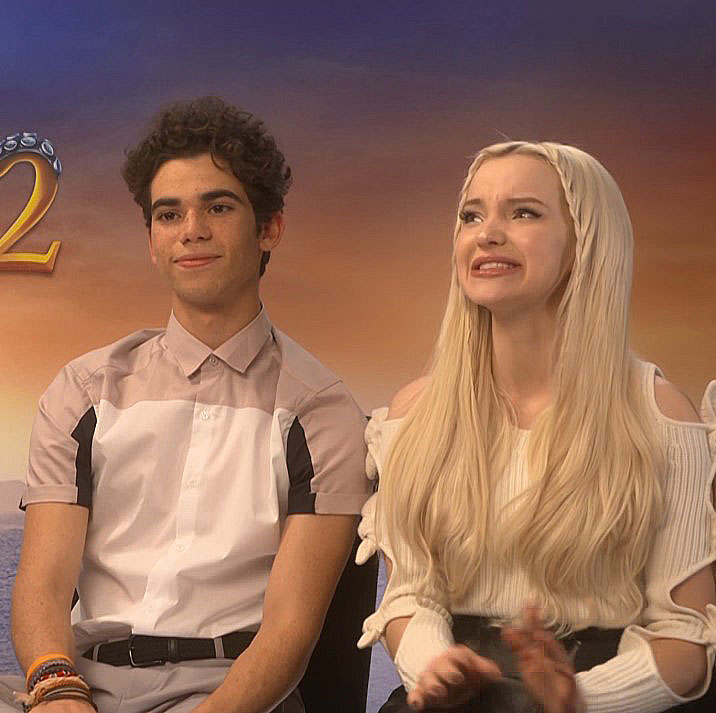
Cameron Boyce and Dove Cameron talking about Descendants 2

=== Development ===
At the 2015 D23 Expo, Disney announced that a Descendants sequel film had been ordered. An official announcement was made on Disney Channel's Facebook page on October 15, 2015. Deadline Hollywood reported that Parriott and McGibbon would return as screenwriters and executive producers for the sequel and that the cast from the first film was expected to return. The budget was reportedly $12 million.

According to China Anne McClain, the post-credits scene featuring Uma saying to the public that "You didn’t think this was the end of the story?" was not included in the original script that she read. However, it was eventually decided to include it in order to foreshadow a possible further sequel, like in the case of the original film.

=== Casting ===
On June 10, 2016, China Anne McClain, who was already voicing Freddie on the Descendants spinoff series Descendants: Wicked World, was announced to be playing Ursula's daughter, Uma, in Descendants 2. In July 2016 it was revealed that Thomas Doherty would play the role of Harry, the son of Captain Hook. In August 2016, Sarah Jeffery who portrays Audrey revealed that she would not be returning, while Brenna D'Amico revealed that she would be returning in Descendants 2, as were Dianne Doan, Jedidiah Goodacre, and Zachary Gibson. On July 19, 2017, it was announced on The View that Whoopi Goldberg would be providing the voice for Ursula, the Sea Witch and Uma's mother.

=== Filming ===
Filming began on September 8, 2016, and wrapped on October 27, 2016. Like Descendants, filming mostly took place in Vancouver and Victoria, British Columbia, Canada.

== Broadcast ==
Descendants 2 made its debut on Disney Channel in Canada on July 21, 2017, at the same time as the United States. In the United States, the film premiered simultaneously across six-Disney owned networks: Disney Channel, Disney XD, Freeform, ABC, Lifetime, and Lifetime Movies. On Disney Channel, the film premiered alongside the world premiere of Raven's Home, which premiered immediately after. In the UK, the film premiered on Disney Channel and Disney XD on October 20, 2017. In South Africa, the film premiered on October 6, 2017. In India, the film premiered on December 23, 2018, on Disney International HD.

== Home media ==
Descendants 2 was released on DVD on August 15, 2017. The film sold 123,760 DVDs in its first week, making it the most sold film in the United States. Overall, the film sold 837,912 DVDs and made $13 million through home media releases.

== Reception ==
=== Ratings ===
In total, the film was viewed by 8.92 million viewers across six networks on the night of its premiere, up from its predecessor in 2015; at least 13 million people watched a minute of the film. On Disney Channel, the film was watched by 5.33 million viewers, and topped the night on cable television, receiving a 1.20 rating. Although down from the first film, it was the most-viewed telecast on the network since the first film. ABC's broadcast of the film received a 0.6/3 rating/share, drawing 2.41 million viewers; 0.47 million viewers watched the film on Disney XD with a 0.12 rating, 0.30 million viewers watched the film on Lifetime with a 0.09 rating, 0.26 million viewers watched the film on Freeform with a 0.08 rating, and 0.15 million viewers watched the film on Lifetime Movies with a 0.05 rating. In delayed viewing, the film rose to a total of 21 million viewers.

On Disney Channel, the film placed second in the week of its DVR ratings, jumping 92% to a 2.3 rating, and topped the week in viewer gains, jumping 104% with an additional 5.54 million viewers, the biggest viewer gain on cable television in two years, totaling to 10.90 million viewers on Disney Channel. On Freeform, the film jumped 207% with an additional 0.54 million viewers, totaling to 0.80 million viewers on the network; on Lifetime Movie Network, the film gained 96% with an additional 0.14 million viewers, totaling to 0.29 million viewers on the network.

=== Accolades ===
Year	Award	Category	Recipients	Result	Ref(s)
2018	Saturn Awards	Best Television Presentation	Descendants 2	Nominated	
2018	Imagen Foundation Awards	Best Supporting Actress – Television	Sofia Carson	Nominated	
2018	Motion Picture Sound Editors Awards	Outstanding Achievement in Sound Editing – Music Score and Musical for Episodic Long Form Broadcast Media	Amber Funk and Richard David Brown	Nominated	

== Soundtrack ==
Descendants 2 (Original TV Movie Soundtrack) is the soundtrack accompanying the film of the same name. The soundtrack and lead single, "Ways to Be Wicked", was announced on April 12, 2017. The soundtrack was released on July 21, 2017.

== Sequel ==
On February 16, 2018, Disney Channel announced that a sequel, Descendants 3, was scheduled to premiere mid-2019. It premiered on August 2, 2019.

== Novel: Rise of the Isle of the Lost ==
A prequel novel called Rise of the Isle of the Lost was released on May 23, 2017. The novel details Uma's rise to power and her earlier history with Mal. The main plot details Uma planning to get the migrating trident of King Triton in order to help bring down the barrier surrounding the Isle of the Lost.

In addition to the mentioning of Genie, Grumpy, and Merriwether being teachers at Auradon Prep, a third school called the Serpent Preparatory School for the Education of Miscreants is located on the Isle of the Lost which Uma and Harry Hook attended. Serpent Prep is a rival of Dragon Hall, where Mal, Jay, Carlos, Gil, and eventually Evie were educated.

The book also introduced Yen Sid's Auradon intern Sophie, Ariel's niece Arabella, and Mulan and Shang's son Li'l Shang who is Lonnie's brother. There was a mentioning that the Stabbington brothers from Tangled are also on the Isle of the Lost where they have Stabbington Cousins. Other information listed here that was later referenced in the film was Audrey and Chad breaking up, the introduction of R.O.A.R., Mal keeping Maleficent's lizard form as a pet, and Evie having her magic mirror placed in the museum.
