= Cameron Boyce =

American actor (1999–2019)

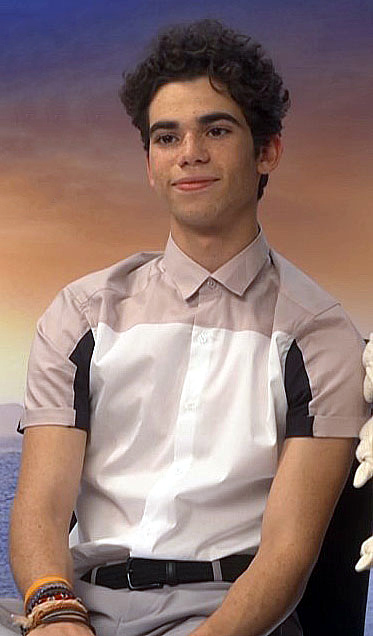
- Boyce in 2017
- Born: Cameron Mica Boyce; May 28, 1999; Los Angeles, California, U.S.
- Died: July 6, 2019 (aged 20); Los Angeles, California, U.S.
- Occupation: Actor
- Years active: 2008–2019 (Note: This is reflective of his working time as an actor, not the final release of his work, which was 2021.)

Cameron Mica Boyce (May 28, 1999 – July 6, 2019) was an American actor. He began his career as a child actor, appearing in the 2008 films Mirrors and Eagle Eye, along with the comedy film Grown Ups (2010) and its 2013 sequel. His first starring role was Luke Ross on the Disney Channel comedy series Jessie (2011–2015).

Continuing to work with Disney, Boyce achieved further prominence as Carlos de Vil, one of the title characters in the musical fantasy Descendants franchise, which included three television films (2015–2019). He also starred as the title character Jake in the Disney Junior series Jake and the Never Land Pirates (2012–2014) and the lead character Conor in Disney XD's Gamer's Guide to Pretty Much Everything (2015–2017).

He died on July 6, 2019 due to sudden unexpected death in epilepsy, less than a month prior to the premiere of Descendants 3. Posthumously, he also headlined the thriller film Runt (2020) and was a series regular on the Amazon Prime Video supernatural thriller Paradise City (2021) as Simon Ostergaard.

== Early and personal life ==
Boyce was born in Los Angeles, California, on May 28, 1999. Boyce was born to an African-American father, Victor Boyce, and a Jewish mother, Libby Boyce. His paternal grandmother, Jo Ann Boyce (née Allen), was one of the Clinton Twelve, the first African-Americans to attend an integrated high school in the Southern United States, in 1956, as ordered by Brown v. Board of Education. His paternal grandfather was from the Caribbean.

Boyce lived in the Los Angeles area with his parents and his younger sister, until he moved in with former co-stars Karan Brar and Sophie Reynolds in May 2019. He was trained in breakdancing, hip-hop, modern dance, jazz, tap dance, and ballet. His favorite style was breakdancing, and, along with four of his friends, he was a member of the breakdancing crew "X Mob".

== Career ==
=== 2008–2014: Early work and acting breakthrough ===
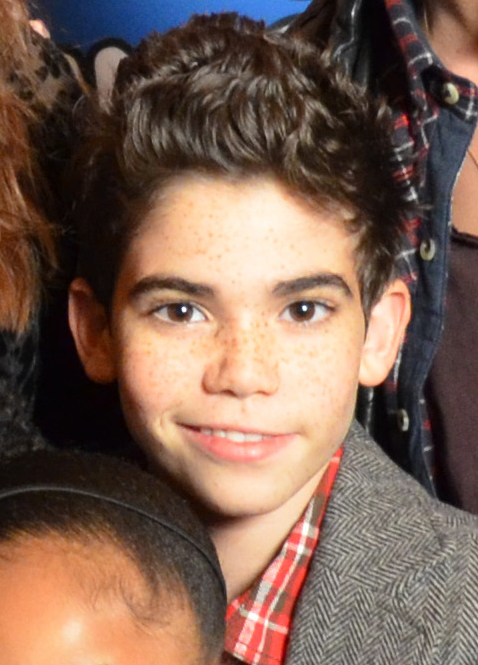
Boyce in 2011

In May 2008, Boyce made his debut as a child actor in the music video "That Green Gentleman (Things Have Changed)", appearing as a younger version of Panic! at the Disco guitarist Ryan Ross. In July 2008, he appeared in General Hospital: Night Shift as a recurring character named Michael. In August 2008, he made his feature film debut with a starring role in the horror film Mirrors, as well as appearing in the mystery-thriller film Eagle Eye that fall.

In June 2010, Boyce starred as Keith, the spoiled son of Adam Sandler's character, in the comedy film Grown Ups and appeared later that same year on the web series The Legion of Extraordinary Dancers.

In April 2011, Boyce made a guest appearance on Disney Channel's comedy series Good Luck Charlie, and later that month he was one of the featured dancers in a royal wedding tribute on ABC's Dancing with the Stars. In June 2011, he had a small role as one of Judy's classmates in the family comedy film Judy Moody and the Not Bummer Summer. In August 2011, he was one of the featured dancers on Disney Channel's comedy series Shake It Up. In September 2011, Boyce was cast in the starring role of Luke Ross on Disney Channel's comedy series Jessie. During pre-production of the series, Luke was originally intended to be a Korean boy named Hiro, but casting directors were impressed with Boyce during the audition process and decided to recreate the role specifically for him.

From 2012 to 2014, he voiced the title character in the Disney Jr. animated series Jake and the Neverland Pirates and in 2013, he reprised his role as Keith in the sequel Grown Ups 2.

=== 2015–2021: Further success ===
In 2015, Boyce was one of the main cast members in Disney Channel's Descendants, playing Carlos, the son of Cruella de Vil. He later reprised the character for the animated shorts Descendants: Wicked World and in the sequels Descendants 2 and Descendants 3, the latter of which was released posthumously.

In March 2018, Boyce was cast in the ABC comedy television pilot Steps, in the role of Becker, and was also cast in the indie film Runt, in the role of Cal.

In January 2019, Boyce had joined the cast of HBO's Mrs. Fletcher. In April 2019, Boyce performed in the music video for "Almost (Sweet Music)" by Hozier. He choreographed the dance with dancer Christine Flores, who appeared in the video alongside him. In September 2019, it was announced that his clothing line called Archives, co-founded by him and stylist and designer Veronica Graye, would be released in November 2019.

On July 14, 2020, a year after Boyce's death, the Alex Winter-directed documentary Showbiz Kids debuted on HBO. The film, which is about childhood stardom and its effects, includes interview footage of Boyce. It is dedicated to the memory of Boyce and to former child actress Diana Serra Cary who died on February 24, 2020, at the age of 101. Just prior to his death, Boyce was to begin production with Sandler on a new project. The project he was due to star in with Sandler, Hubie Halloween, was released on October 7, 2020, with a dedication to Boyce that read, "In loving memory of Cameron Boyce. Gone way too soon and one of the kindest, coolest, funniest, and most talented kids we knew. You live on forever in our hearts and are truly missed everyday."

== Death ==
On July 6, 2019, at the age of 20, Boyce was found unresponsive at his home in Los Angeles, California. Authorities were called, and he was pronounced dead at the scene. According to a statement made by Boyce's family, he died in his sleep "due to a seizure which was a result of an ongoing medical condition for which he was being treated". An autopsy was performed, but release of a cause of death was deferred pending further investigation. On July 9, Boyce's family confirmed that his death was caused by an epileptic seizure and that Boyce was previously diagnosed with epilepsy. The autopsy results were released by the Los Angeles County Department of Medical Examiner-Coroner on July 30, confirming Boyce's cause of death was due to sudden unexpected death in epilepsy. His body was cremated, and his ashes were returned to his family.

== Philanthropy and legacy ==
In the span of 40 days in 2017, Boyce helped raise over $27,000 for the Thirst Project, which helps bring clean water to underdeveloped countries. In September 2019, Thirst Project officially changed the name of the Pioneering Spirit Award to the Cameron Boyce Pioneering Spirit Award, to honor his work with the organization.

He also supported United Way of America's initiative to end homelessness. He helped raise money for the HomeWalk in 2015, and continued to do so until his death. In May 2019, he participated in the opening ceremony of the 12th annual HomeWalk in downtown Los Angeles, one of the largest public events to end homelessness in the United States.

Boyce also worked closely with It's On Us, a social movement created to raise awareness and fight against sexual assault on college campuses for both men and women.

He also worked with the Lucstrong Foundation, which provides grants to families with children who are diagnosed with sickle cell disease and are going through the bone marrow transplant process.

His final humanitarian project was called Wielding Peace, a social media campaign in conjunction with Delaney Tarr, co-founder of March for Our Lives. In Boyce's own words, the campaign would "help fight against gun violence by showing celebrities and survivors 'wielding' a new kind of weapon — one of unity."

In 2025, Grown Ups producer and co-star Adam Sandler paid tribute to Boyce in a moment from Happy Gilmore 2. In the scene, Boyce briefly appears on a television screen showing a clip from the Disney Channel series Jessie (2011–15), which he starred in.

in 2026, Descendants co-star Dove Cameron paid tribute to Boyce in her debut album's final song, "Maybe Heaven is a Jazz Club", which features a clip of Boyce's voice posthumously saying, "So we'll see you very soon".

=== Cameron Boyce Foundation ===
Following Boyce's death in 2019, the Cameron Boyce Foundation, a nonprofit organization, was founded in Los Angeles through Network for Good. It provides young people artistic and creative outlets as alternatives to violence and negativity, and it uses resources and philanthropy for positive change in the world.

On July 25, 2019, the foundation disclosed the first project to be carried out was Wielding Peace, which officially launched on August 16, 2019. The foundation later donated $8,000 to Thirst Project to build a well in Uganda.

== Filmography ==
=== Film ===
Year	Title	Role	Notes	Ref.
2008	Mirrors	Michael Carson		
2008	Eagle Eye	Sam Holloman		
2010	Grown Ups	Keithie Feder		
2011	Judy Moody and the Not Bummer Summer	Hunter		
2013	Grown Ups 2	Keithie Feder		
2020	Showbiz Kids	Himself	Documentary; posthumous release	
2020	Runt	Cal	Posthumous release	

=== Television ===
Year	Title	Role	Notes	Ref.
2008	General Hospital: Night Shift	Michael "Stone" Cates Jr.	Recurring role	
2009	The 7th Annual TV Land Awards	Jimmy		
2011	Good Luck Charlie	Fake Gabe Duncan	Episode: "The Singin' Dancin' Duncans"	
2011	Shake It Up	Lil Highlighter Dancer	Episode: "Throw It Up"	
2011–2015	Jessie	Luke Ross	Main role	
2012–2015	Jake and the Never Land Pirates	Jake, ChillyZack (voice)	Main role (seasons 2–3); Guest role (season 4)	
2014	Ultimate Spider-Man	Luke Ross (voice)	Episode: "Halloween Night at the Museum"	
2015–2017	Gamer's Guide to Pretty Much Everything	Conor	Lead role	
2015–2017	Descendants: Wicked World	Carlos (voice)	Television shorts	
2015	Liv and Maddie	Krahgg	Episode: "Prom-a-Rooney"	
2015	Descendants	Carlos	Television film	
2016	Bunk'd	Luke Ross	2 episodes: "Luke's Back", "Luke Out Below"	
2016	Code Black	Brody	Episode: "Love Hurts"	
2017	Descendants 2	Carlos	Television film	
2017	Spider-Man	Shocker / Herman Schultz (voice)	Episode: "Osborn Academy"	
2019	Descendants 3	Carlos	Television film; posthumous release; dedicated in memory	
2019	Wicked Woods: A Descendants Halloween Story	Carlos	Television short; posthumous release	
2019	Mrs. Fletcher	Zach	5 episodes; posthumous release	
2021	Paradise City	Simon Ostergaard	8 episodes; posthumous release	

=== Music videos ===
Year	Title	Artist	Role	Ref.
2008	That Green Gentleman (Things Have Changed)	Panic! at the Disco	Young Ryan Ross	

=== Video games and web series ===
Year	Title	Role	Notes	Ref.
2010	Just Dance Kids	Coach and background dancer	Video game	
2010	The Legion of Extraordinary Dancers	Young Jasper	Web series; episode: "Origins"	

== Awards and nominations ==
Year	Award	Category	Work	Result	Ref.
2012	Young Artist Award	Best Performance in a Feature Film – Young Ensemble Cast	Judy Moody and the Not Bummer Summer	Won	
2017	Daytime Emmy Award	Outstanding Promotional Announcement	Timeless Heroes – Be Inspired	Won	
2018	Pioneering Spirit Award	Inspirational efforts to support the fight against the world's water crisis	Thirst Project	Won	
