= Booboo Stewart =

American actor (born 1994)

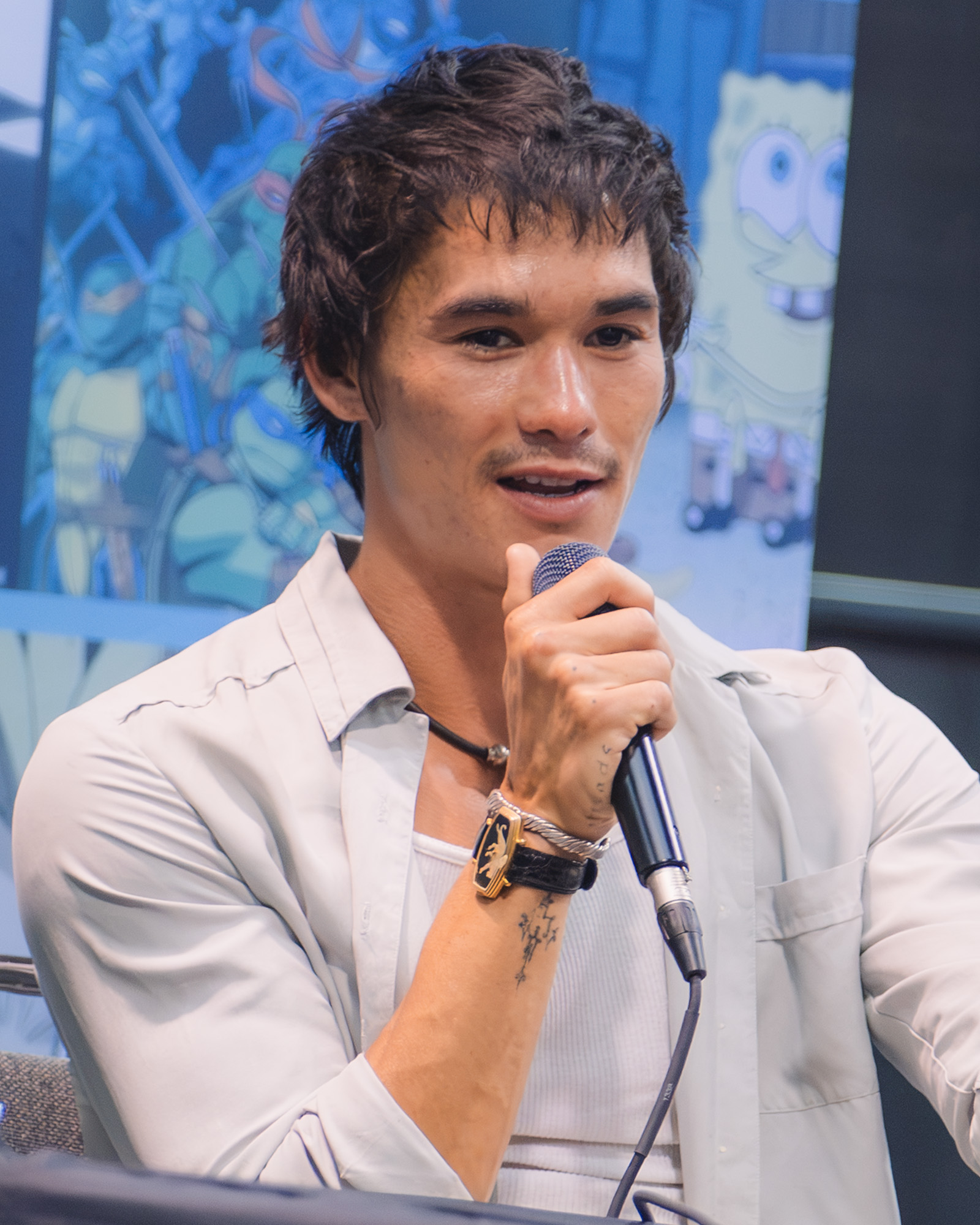
- Stewart in 2026
- Born: Nils Allen Stewart Jr. January 21, 1994 (age 32); Beverly Hills, California, U.S.
- Other names: Booboo Stewart; Booboo Torrali
- Occupation: Actor
- Years active: 2004–present
- Relatives: Fivel Stewart (sister)

Nils Allen "Booboo" Stewart Jr. (born January 21, 1994) is an American actor, musician, and visual artist. He is known for playing Seth Clearwater in The Twilight Saga; Warpath in X-Men: Days of Future Past; Jay in the Disney television film franchise Descendants; Luca in Good Trouble; and Willie in Julie and the Phantoms.

== Early life ==
Nils Allen Stewart, Jr. was born in Beverly Hills, California. His father, Nils Allen Stewart, Sr., is a professional stuntman. His mother is of Japanese, Chinese, and Korean descent while his father is of Russian, Scottish and Native American descent.

Stewart is the older brother of actress Fivel Stewart. He was a former member of T-Squad, a Disney hip-hop/pop group, and performed with his sisters, Fivel and Maegan, as part of "TSC" (The Stewart Clan).

== Career ==
=== Early career ===
During 2006–2010, Stewart appeared or starred in several independent, direct-to-video, or TV films. He also hosted six episodes of the children's show Blue Dolphin Kids in Hawaii, and did stunt work on several films including the 2006 film Zoom and the 2007 film Beowulf. He had roles on episodes of Steve Harvey's Big Time Challenge, ER, Dante's Cove, Everybody Hates Chris and R.L. Stine's The Haunting Hour. Stewart also toured with Hannah Montana/Miley Cyrus on her Best of Both Worlds Tour featuring the Jonas Brothers and in the Camp Rock Freestyle Jam concert series. He recorded the opening theme for the Disney Channel Games 2008 titled "Let's Go!", and in 2010 "Under the Sea" (from The Little Mermaid) for the Disney recompilation disc DisneyMania 7. He promoted clothes, as well as toys and games such as Wii Fit and Hot Wheels. He also played Roman in Lab Rats: Elite Force.

During 2006–2008, he was a member of the musical group T-Squad.

=== 2010–present: Theatrical debut & stepping into other art forms ===
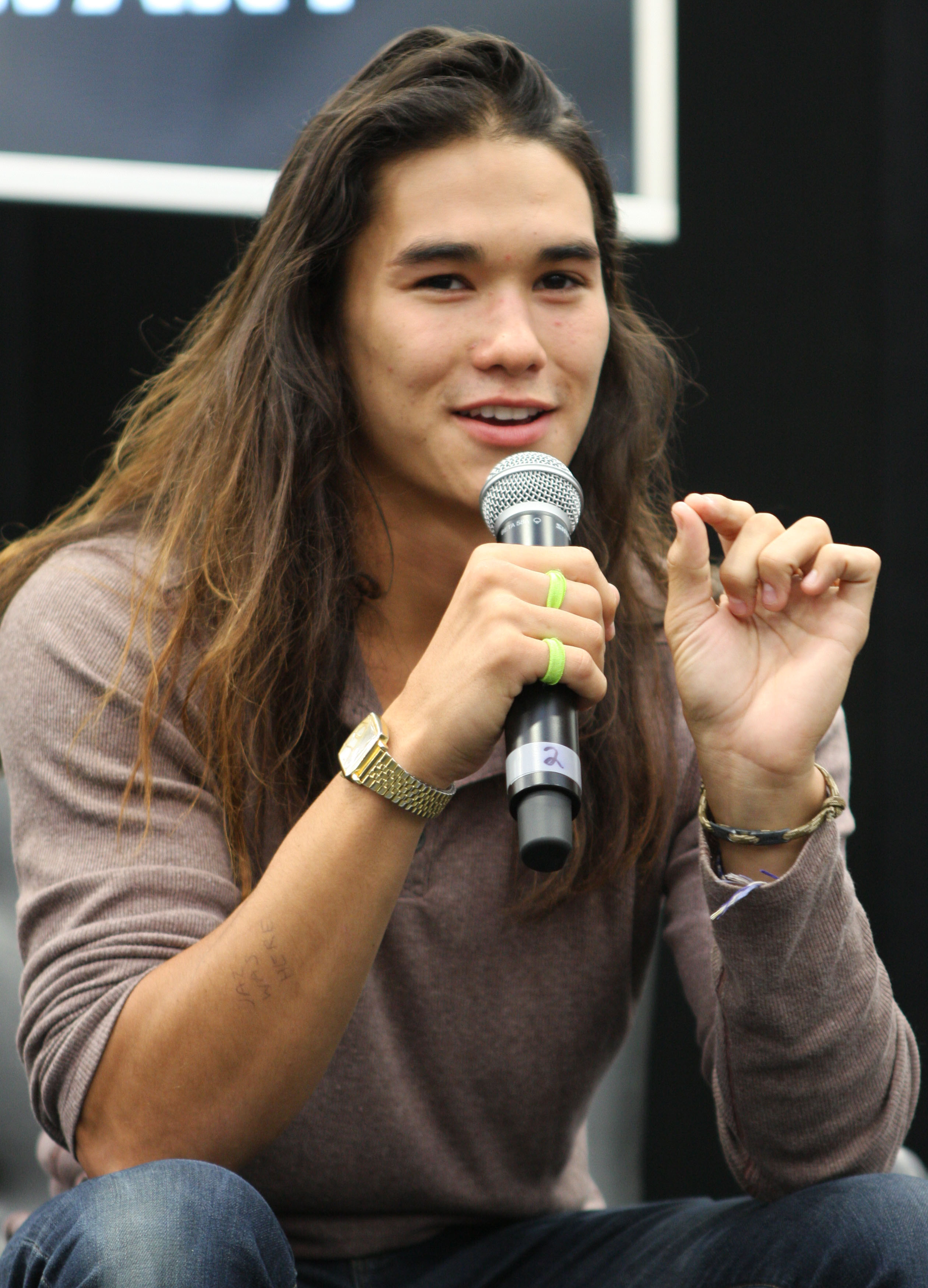
Stewart in 2014

In 2010, Stewart appeared in the movie Logan, a coming of age story about two brothers. He portrayed Seth Clearwater in The Twilight Saga: Eclipse, the third installment of The Twilight Saga film series, as well as The Twilight Saga: Breaking Dawn - Part 1 in 2011 and The Twilight Saga: Breaking Dawn - Part 2 in 2012.

In 2012, Stewart starred in the movie White Frog as Nick Young, a teen with Asperger syndrome. In 2013, he played the lead role in Running Deer, an award-winning short film produced and directed by Brent Ryan Green through Toy Gun Films. Stewart also appeared in 2014's X-Men: Days of Future Past acting as Warpath.

In 2013, Stewart appeared in Space Warriors alongside Danny Glover, Dermot Mulroney, Josh Lucas, Mira Sorvino, directed by Sean McNamara.

Stewart starred in the 2015 Disney Channel original movie Descendants as Jay, the son of Jafar. He reprised his role in the 2017 and 2019 sequels, Descendants 2 and Descendants 3. In 2020, Stewart appeared as Willie in the Netflix series Julie and the Phantoms, and as Peter Dragswolf in the film Let Him Go.

Since 2018, Stewart has been a member of the Los Angeles-based boy band, That Band Honey. Stewart is also a mixed media artist, and has occasionally lent his artistic talents to fundraisers and non-profit organizations.

== Philanthropic activities ==
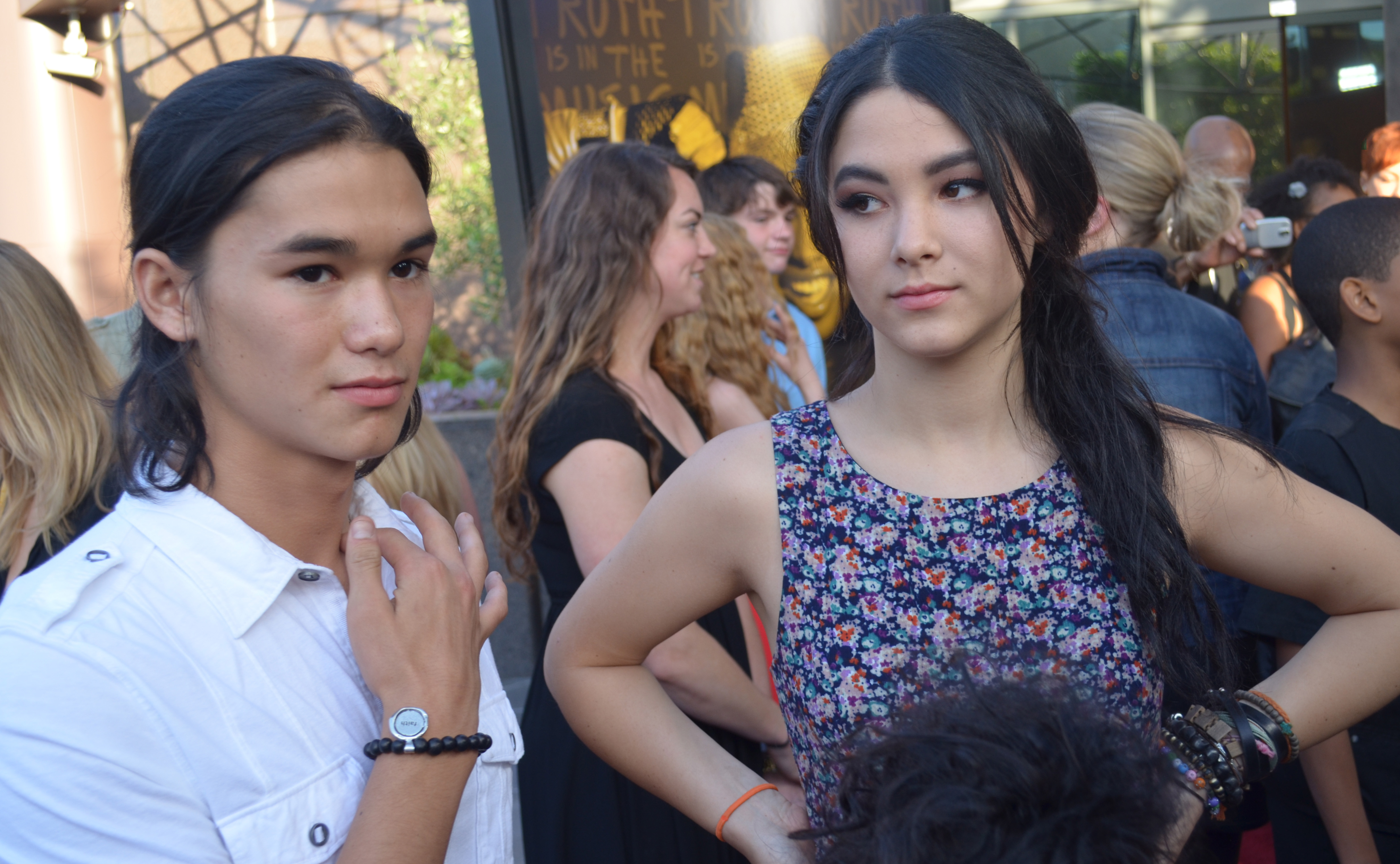
Booboo and Fivel Stewart at the Hollywood Premiere of Disney Channel's Let It Shine In June 2012.

In 2010, he was named a Celebrity Ambassador by the Muscular Dystrophy Association. In his role, Stewart is helping raise awareness in the fight against muscle diseases. He is also part of MDA's "Make a Muscle, Make a Difference" PSA campaign, being featured in print and TV advertisements. He also travelled to Perth, Australia for the Channel 7 Telethon, raising money for the Princess Margaret Hospital for Children. Stewart and his sister Fivel also hosted free concerts on behalf of the national non-profit organization Childhelp.

He appeared in a PETA campaign, encouraging people to adopt animals rather than to buy them from pet stores. He is also involved in Four Green Steps, an environmental organization based in Canada.

== Filmography ==
Film roles
Year	Title	Role	Notes
2004	Yard Sale	Little Boy	
2005	Pit Fighter	Vendor	Uncredited
2005	Uncle P	Bike Kid	
2006	18 Fingers of Death!	Young Buford	
2006	The Conrad Boys	Ben Conrad	
2006	666: The Child	Donald	
2007	The Last Sentinel	Young Tallis	
2008	The Fifth Commandment	Young Chance	
2009	American Cowslip	Cary	
2009	How I Survived the Zombie Apocalypse	Son	Short film
2010	Dark Games	Jake Wincott	
2010	The Twilight Saga: Eclipse	Seth Clearwater	Nominated — Razzie Award for Worst Screen Ensemble
2010	Logan	Ben	Also producer
2011	Jake Stevens: The Last Protector	Jake Stevens	
2011	Dark Games	Jake Wincott	
2011	The Twilight Saga: Breaking Dawn – Part 1	Seth Clearwater	Nominated — Razzie Award for Worst Screen Ensemble
2012	Smitty	Peabo	
2012	The Twilight Saga: Breaking Dawn – Part 2	Seth Clearwater	Razzie Award for Worst Screen Ensemble
2012	White Frog	Nick Young	
2012	Just Yell Fire: Campus Life	Himself	Short documentary
2013	Hansel & Gretel: Warriors of Witchcraft	Jonah (Hansel)	
2013	Isolated	Ambassador for Peace	
2013	Running Deer	Tyler	Short film
2013	Freeze	Booboo	Short film
2014	X-Men: Days of Future Past	James Proudstar / Warpath	
2014	An Evergreen Christmas	Angel	
2014	Like a Country Song	Bobby	
2014	The Last Survivors	Dean	
2015	Hope Bridge	Jackson	
2015	He Never Died	Jeremy	
2015	Tales of Halloween	Isaac	
2015	Dominion	Marek	
2016	Honeyglue	Bailey	
2016	Loveology	Ryan	
2016	Sun Valley	Campbell	
2017	American Satan	Vic Lakota	
2017	Intrepid		Short film
2017	It's Gawd!	J	
2018	Marvel Rising: Secret Warriors	Victor Kohl / Exile	Voice role
2018	The Grizzlies	Kyle	
2018	We Are Boats	Taylor	
2018	Bad Company	Camino	
2018	Good Girls Get High	Jeremy	
2018	#Roxy	Christian	
2020	Let Him Go	Peter Dragswolf	
2020	The Never List	Lead Singer	
2021	Ass Clowns: Constipated	Celebrity Ring Announcer	
2022	Those Who Walk Away	Max	
2022	My Dead Dad	Keiffer	
2024	The Adventures of Tikki the Wonder Dog	Picasso	
Television roles
Year	Title	Role	Notes
2004	Big Time	Martial artist	Unknown episodes
2004	Skeleton Man	Child Warrior	Sci Fi Pictures original film
2004–2006	Dante's Cove	Stephen	5 episodes, 1 episode credit only Unaired pilot as Boo Boo Torra
2005	ER	Power Ranger	Episode: "Man with No Name"
2006	Everybody Hates Chris	Kid / Ping	2 episodes
2006	Blue Dolphin Kids	Himself / Host	11 episodes, 3 episodes as Actor
2010	CSI: Miami	Kenny Turner	Episode: "Die by the Sword"
2011	TNA Impact	Himself	Special guest appearance
2011	Good Luck Charlie	Kai	Episodes: "Sun Show Part 1", "Sun Show Part 2"
2011	The Haunting Hour: The Series	Kai	Episode: "Pool Shark"
2012	Kickin' It	Carson	Episode: "New Jack City"
2013	Space Warriors	Conway	Sci Fi Pictures original film
2014	Hawaii Five-0	Tommy Fa'aloa	Episode: "Ma Lalo o ka 'ili"
2015	Grimm	Simon George	Episode: "Mishipeshu"
2015	CSI: Cyber	Owen Campbell	Episode: "URL, Interrupted"
2015	Blue Peter	Himself	1 episode
2015	Descendants	Jay	Disney Channel Original Movie
2015–2017	Descendants: Wicked World	Jay	Main voice role
2016	Lab Rats: Elite Force	Roman	Recurring role
2017	Descendants 2	Jay	Disney Channel Original Movie
2018	Westworld	Etu	Episode: "Kiksuya"
2018	Spider-Man	Daniel Drumm / Jack O'Lantern	Voice role; Episode: "Bring on the Bad Guys" Pt. 3
2019	Marvel Rising: Chasing Ghosts	Victor Kohl / Exile	Voice role
2019	Descendants 3	Jay	Disney Channel Original Movie
2020	Robot Chicken	Jay	Voice role; Episode: "Sundancer Craig in: 30% of the Way to Crying"
2020	Julie and the Phantoms	Willie	Recurring; 7 episodes
2020	Dr. Seuss' The Grinch Musical Live!	Young Max	Television special
2021	Big City Greens	Kevin	Voice role; Episode: "Big Resolution"
2021	Descendants: The Royal Wedding	Jay	Animated special; voice role
2021	Paradise City	Vic Lakota	TV spinoff of American Satan
2022–2024	Good Trouble	Luca	Main role (season 5); Recurring role (season 4)
Music video roles
Year	Music video	Artist(s)	Notes
2004	"Just Lose It"	Eminem	
2005	"Keep It Goin' On"	Daichi Miura	
2008	"Kung Fu Fighting"	Cee-Lo Green and Jack Black	From DreamWorks' Kung Fu Panda
2015	"Til the Dust Is Gone"	Art of Anarchy	From Art of Anarchy
2019	"I Never Liked Your Friends"	The Federal Empire	
2020	"The New Kid in Town"	Baby Ariel	From Zombies 2
