= List of Descendants characters =

The Disney Channel media franchise Descendants features a large number of characters, the majority of whom are related to or based upon existing Disney characters.

== Introduced in Descendants film series ==
=== Introduced in Descendants ===
Characters introduced in the first Descendants film: (Note: Several of them previously debuted in the film's prequel novel The Isle of the Lost, including Mal, Evie, Jay, Carlos De Vil, Ben, Audrey, Maleficent, the Evil Queen, Jafar, Cruella De Vil, King Beast, and Queen Belle.)

==== Descendants ====
Villain Kids

- Mal (played by Dove Cameron) is the daughter of Maleficent (Sleeping Beauty) and Hades (Hercules) and the protagonist of the first three films. Hades left when she was a baby, with both resuming their relationship as father and daughter in Descendants 3. She is best friends with Evie. During Descendants, she becomes Ben's girlfriend, and after she's engaged to him in Descendants 3, Mal becomes the queen of both Auradon and the Isle of the Lost.
- Evie (played by Sofia Carson) is the daughter of the Evil Queen (Snow White and the Seven Dwarfs). She is very good at cooking, sewing, making clothes, and fashion design. She is best friends with Mal and owns her own fashion company Evie's Four Hearts. She becomes Doug's girlfriend.
- Jay (played by Booboo Stewart) is the son of Jafar (Aladdin). He used to steal for his father's pawn shop. Now in Auradon, he is the Captain of the Tourney team. (In Descendants 2, he surrenders this position to Lonnie.)
- Carlos De Vil (played by Cameron Boyce) is the son of Cruella De Vil (101 Dalmatians). Carlos is jumpy and anxious, but has the skills of a true tech prodigy. In Descendants 2 is shown that he is in love with Jane, later becoming her boyfriend. Initially, he was afraid of dogs, until he met Dude, who became his pet. Carlos died from unknown causes after the events of Descendants 3 and before Descendants: The Royal Wedding.

Auradon Kids

- Ben (played by Mitchell Hope) is the son of King Beast and Queen Belle (Beauty and the Beast), and the current king of Auradon. In Descendants 2, Ben ventures to the Isle of the Lost in hopes of finding Mal and bringing her back to Auradon, disguising himself as a VK so he can infiltrate the isle without being detected. In Descendants 3, Ben proposes to Mal.
- Jane (played by Brenna D'Amico) is the daughter of Fairy Godmother (Cinderella). Since Descendants 2, she is Carlos' girlfriend. She is very sweet, creative, and jumpy.
- Doug (played by Zachary Gibson) is the son of the dwarf Dopey (Snow White and the Seven Dwarfs), and a member of the school musical band. He becomes Evie's boyfriend.
- Audrey (played by Sarah Jeffery) is the daughter of Princess Aurora and Prince Phillip (Sleeping Beauty), who is shown to be opposed to the idea of the villain kids being welcomed to Auradon. Though she did not make an appearance on Descendants 2, she is mentioned various times, especially by Chad Charming. In Descendants, she was mean to all the villain kids, but especially Mal. She acts as the main antagonist in Descendants 3, where she steals the crown and the scepter and turns evil but is later defeated. Later on, Audrey apologizes to Mal and Ben for what she had done and she decides to make peace with the villain kids.
- Lonnie (portrayed by Dianne Doan) is the daughter of Mulan and Li Shang (Mulan). Lonnie has an older brother named Li'l Shang who was introduced in the books.
- Chad Charming (portrayed by Jedidiah Goodacre) is the son of Cinderella and Prince Charming (Cinderella). He is also the older brother of Chloe Charming. Like Audrey, in the first film, he is distrusting of the VKs. After Queen Leah angrily tells Mal about her loss of time with Aurora due to Maleficent, Chad takes the opportunity to berate the VKs, as a result, Jay pushes him and Evie sprays him unconscious with a tranquilizer. In Descendants 2, Chad is shown a lot playing with the 3D printer in Carlos's room. He is also the ex-boyfriend of Princess Audrey. In Descendants 3, he decides to become Audrey's sidekick, however, Audrey locks him in a closet at her cottage. He is later discovered by Ben and the VKs, and he runs away frightened.

==== Disney classic characters ====
- King Beast (portrayed by Dan Payne), from Beauty and the Beast, is the former king of Auradon, Queen Belle's husband and Ben's father.
- Queen Belle (portrayed by Keegan Connor Tracy), from Beauty and the Beast, is the former queen of Auradon, King Beast's wife, and Ben's mother.
- Fairy Godmother (portrayed by Melanie Paxson, and by Grace Narducci as a teen in The Rise of Red), from Cinderella, also known as Fay in her youth, is the principal of Auradon Prep, and Jane's mother.
- Maleficent (portrayed by Kristin Chenoweth, and by Mars as a teen in The Rise of Red), from Sleeping Beauty, is Mal's mother, and the queen of the Isle of the Lost until she was defeated in Descendants.
- Evil Queen (portrayed by Kathy Najimy), from Snow White and the Seven Dwarfs, is Evie's mother.
- Cruella De Vil (portrayed by Wendy Raquel Robinson), from 101 Dalmatians, is Carlos' mother.
- Jafar (portrayed by Maz Jobrani), from Aladdin, is Jay's father.
- Queen Leah (portrayed by Judith Maxie), from Sleeping Beauty, is Audrey's maternal grandmother.
- Snow White (portrayed by Stephanie Bennett), from Snow White and the Seven Dwarfs, is the news reporter on Auradon television.

==== Other characters ====
- Dude (voiced by Bobby Moynihan) is a dog that was taken in by the Auradon Academy and becomes Carlos's pet and best friend. Since Descendants 2, he gains the ability to speak after consuming a gummy enchanted by Mal.
- Coach Jenkins (portrayed by Reese Alexander) is the Tourney coach at the Auradon Academy. He teaches Jay to work on a team.

=== Introduced in Descendants 2 ===
Characters introduced in the second film Descendants 2: (Note: Several of them previously debuted in the film's prequel novel Rise of the Isle of the Lost, including Uma, Harry Hook, and Dizzy Tremaine.)

==== Descendants ====
- Uma (portrayed by China Anne McClain) is the daughter of Ursula (The Little Mermaid), and the leader of the pirates on the Isle. After Maleficent is transformed into a lizard, Uma becomes the self-proclaimed leader of the Isle of the Lost. She and Mal were fierce archenemies after Mal doused Uma with a bucket of shrimp and christened her "Shrimpy". In Descendants 3, Mal and Uma put their differences aside to save Auradon and eventually reconcile. She later becomes the Headmistress of Auradon Prep in The Rise of Red.
- Harry Hook (portrayed by Thomas Doherty) is the middle child of Captain Hook (Peter Pan). He is Uma's first mate and best friend. Harry is the grandson of an unknown man.
- Gil (portrayed by Dylan Playfair) is the youngest son of Gaston (Beauty and the Beast). He is part of Uma's crew. In Descendants 3, Gil bonds with Jay.
- Dizzy Tremaine (portrayed by Anna Cathcart) is the daughter of Drizella Tremaine (Cinderella), and works for her grandmother Lady Tremaine at "Curl Up & Dye" on Isle of the Lost. In Descendants 2, she is in charge of giving Mal a hairstyle change. In Descendants 3, she was chosen by Evie to come to Auradon.

==== Disney classic characters ====
- Lumière (portrayed by Jan Bos in Descendants 2 and by Sean Yves Lessard in Hidden Heroes: A Descendants Story), from Beauty and the Beast, is Lou’s father, and the butler of Auradon's royal family.
- Ursula (voiced by Whoopi Goldberg), from The Little Mermaid, is Uma's mother, and the owner of "Ursula's Fish and Chips". She does not physically appear and is only heard screaming when her tentacle pokes out of the kitchen door at her restaurant. She is also Uliana's older sister.

=== Introduced in Descendants 3 ===
Characters introduced in the third film Descendants 3:

==== Descendants ====
- Celia Facilier (portrayed by Jadah Marie) is the youngest daughter of Dr. Facilier (The Princess and the Frog). She tells fortunes and runs errands for Hades. She is chosen by Mal to travel to Auradon.
- Squeaky and Squirmy Smee (portrayed by Christian Convery and Luke Roessler in Descendants 3 and by Ryan McEwen and Dayton Paradis in Descendants: Wicked Wonderland) are the twin sons of Mr. Smee (Peter Pan). They were chosen by Carlos and Jay to travel to Auradon.

==== Disney classic characters ====
- Hades (Note: Although the character Hades is listed here, he previously debuted in the film's prequel novel Escape from the Isle of the Lost. In addition, a bust of him was seen previously in the episode "Pair of Sneakers" of Descendants: Wicked World.) (portrayed by Cheyenne Jackson, and by Anthony Pyatt as a teen in The Rise of Red), from Hercules, is the former ruler of the Underworld and Greek god of the dead. He is the father of Hadie and Mal.
- Mr. Smee (portrayed by Faustino Di Bauda), from Peter Pan, is the father of Sammy Smee and the twins Squeaky and Squirmy.

=== Introduced in Descendants: The Rise of Red ===
Characters introduced in the fourth film Descendants: The Rise of Red: (Note: Several of them previously debuted in the film's prequel novel Beyond the Isle of the Lost: Wonderland, including Red and the Queen, as well as Chloe Charming, Cinderella, and King Charming in the Barnes & Noble extended version.)

==== Descendants ====
- Red (portrayed by Kylie Cantrall) is the daughter of the Queen of Hearts (Alice in Wonderland), and the older sister of Pink.
- Chloe Charming (portrayed by Malia Baker) is the daughter of Cinderella and King Charming (Cinderella), and the younger sister of Chad.
- Maddox Hatter (portrayed by Leonardo Nam) is the son of the Mad Hatter (Alice in Wonderland) and father of Max.

==== Disney classic characters ====
- Queen of Hearts (portrayed by Rita Ora as an adult, and by Ruby Rose Turner as a teenager), from Alice in Wonderland, known as Bridget the Princess of Hearts in her youth, is Red and Pink's mother.
- Cinderella (Note: Although formally introduced in the fourth film, Cinderella and King Charming made cameo appearances in Descendants during Ben's coronation ceremony, and in Descendants 2 during the royal cotillone, in both cases appearing as background characters played by uncredited actors.) (portrayed by Brandy Norwood as an adult, and by Morgan Dudley as a teenager), from Cinderella, being known as Ella in her youth, is Chad and Chloe's mother, and King Charming's wife.
- King Charming (portrayed by Paolo Montalban as an adult, and by Tristan Padil as a teenager), from Cinderella, is Chad and Chloe's father, and Cinderella's husband.
- Aladdin (portrayed by Levin Valayil as an adult, and by Kabir Bery as a teenager), from Aladdin, is Jasmine's husband.
- Jasmine (portrayed by Shazia Pascal as an adult, and by Aiza Azaar as a teenager), from Aladdin, is Aladdin's wife.

==== Other characters ====
- Uliana (portrayed by Dara Reneé) is the younger sister of Ursula (The Little Mermaid), who in the past was the leader of a gang of Villain Kids.
- Morgie (portrayed by Peder Lindell) is the son of Morgana le Fay, who is part of Uliana's gang.
- Jack of Diamonds (portrayed by Alex Boniello) is the captain of the Queen of Hearts's Red Army.
- Meadow (portrayed by Sam Morelos) is a student at Merlin Academy.

=== Introduced in Descendants: Wicked Wonderland ===
Characters introduced in the fifth film Descendants: Wicked Wonderland:

- Pink (portrayed by Liamani Segura) is the daughter of the Queen of Hearts (Alice in Wonderland) and younger sister of Red.
- Max Hatter (portrayed by Brendon Tremblay) is the son of Maddox Hatter, and grandson of the Mad Hatter (Alice in Wonderland).
- Luis Madrigal (portrayed by Alexandro Byrd) is the son of Luisa Madrigal (Encanto).
- Hazel Hook (portrayed by Kiara Romero) is the daughter of Captain Hook (Peter Pan), and younger sister of Harriet, Harry, and CJ Hook.
- Robbie Hood (portrayed by Joel Oulette) is the son of Robin Hood (Robin Hood), and younger brother of Bobby Hood.
- Felix Facilier (portrayed by Zavien Garrett) is the son of Dr. Facilier (The Princess and the Frog), and younger brother of Freddie and Celia Facilier.
- Chessy Cheshire (voiced by Awkwafina) is the daughter of Cheshire Cat (Alice in Wonderland).

=== Introduced in Hidden Heroes: A Descendants Story ===
Characters introduced in the spinoff film Hidden Heroes: A Descendants Story:

==== Descendants ====
- Jennie (portrayed by Dior Goodjohn) is the daughter of the Genie (Aladdin), and younger sister of Jordan.
- Zara (portrayed by Momona Tamada) is the daughter of Yzma (The Emperor's New Groove), and the younger sister of Yzla and Zevon.
- Kronk Jr. (portrayed by Jacob Rodriguez) is the son of Kronk (The Emperor's New Groove).
- Meri (portrayed by Eva Fossaceca) is the daughter of Merryweather (Sleeping Beauty).
- Lou (portrayed by Harry Jones) is the son of Lumiere (Beauty and the Beast).
- The Potts Siblings are the children of Mrs. Potts (Beauty and the Beast), and the younger siblings of Chip and Carina:
  - Scratch Potts (Connor Wong)
  - Nic Potts (Kyra Wong)
  - Unnamed sibling (Rhys Dawkins)

==== Disney classic characters ====
- Jiminy Cricket (portrayed/voiced by Darren Criss), from Pinocchio
- Yzma (portrayed by Sherry Cola), from The Emperor's New Groove, is the mother of Yzla, Zevon, and Zara
- Genie (portrayed by James Monroe Iglehart), (Note: The character previously debuted in the novel The Isle of the Lost.) from Aladdin, is the father of Jordan and Jennie
- Kronk (portrayed by Hugo Ateo), from The Emperor's New Groove, is the father of Kronk Jr.

== Introduced in Descendants: School of Secrets ==
Characters in the shorts of the Descendants: School of Secrets series, not counting those who later appear in the film series:

- Long Haired Princess is the unnamed daughter of Rapunzel and Eugene Fitzherbert (Tangled), and the sister of Ruby.
- Sleepy Jr. is the son of Sleepy (Snow White and the Seven Dwarfs).
- Bashful Jr. is the son of Bashful (Snow White and the Seven Dwarfs).

== Introduced in the Isle of the Lost book series ==
=== Introduced in The Isle of the Lost ===
==== Descendants ====
- Diego De Vil is the cousin of Carlos and the nephew of Cruella De Vil (101 Dalmatians).
- Harold "Harry" Badun is the child of Horace (101 Dalmatians), and is one of Carlos' henchmen.
- Jason "Jace" Badun is the child of Jasper (101 Dalmatians), and is one of Carlos' henchmen.
- Anthony Tremaine is the son of Anastasia Tremaine and grandson of Lady Tremaine (Cinderella). Cousin of Dizzy.
- Ginny Gothel is the daughter of Mother Gothel (Tangled). She also hates Mal.
- Claudine Frollo is the daughter of Claude Frollo (The Hunchback of Notre Dame).
- Harriet Hook is the eldest child of Captain Hook (Peter Pan), and older sister of Harry, CJ and Hazel. She appears in the books The Isle of The Lost and Rise of the Isle of the Lost.
- Sammy Smee is the eldest child of Mr. Smee (Peter Pan), and the older brother of Squeaky and Squirmy.
- Yzla is the daughter of Yzma (The Emperor's New Groove), and the sister of Zevon and Zara.
- Aziz is the son of Aladdin and Jasmine (Aladdin).
- Sea Witches are the possible relatives of Ursula (The Little Mermaid).
- Beelzebub is Carlos' pet cat, and the daughter of Lucifer (Cinderella).

==== Disney classic characters ====
- Dr. Facilier (portrayed by Jamal Sims), from The Princess and the Frog, is Freddie, Celia and Felix's father. In the book Isle of the Lost, he appears as the principal and one of the teachers at the school of the Isle of the Lost. In the films, he makes an appearance in Descendants 3.
- Lady Tremaine (portrayed by Linda Ko in Descendants 3, Julee Cerda in The Rise of Red), from Cinderella, is Anthony and Dizzy's grandmother, and Ella's stepmother. In the book The Isle of the Lost, she appears as one of the teachers at the school of the Isle of the Lost. In Descendants 2, she can only be heard yelling at her granddaughter from the top of her hair salon. In Descendants 3, she appears saying goodbye to her granddaughter when she leaves the Isle. A younger Lady Tremaine appears in The Rise of Red, ordering Ella to do the housework.
- Mother Gothel, from Tangled, appears as one of the teachers at the school of the Isle of the Lost. She is Ginny's mother.
- Yen Sid (portrayed by Dan Bakkedahl), from Fantasia, is a sorcerer who was sent to the Isle of the Lost by the King Beast to apply a little kindness to the children of villains, serving as a science teacher at school. In Return to the Isle of the Lost, he finds a secret club joined by the children of villains who want to change just like Mal and her friends.
- Captain Hook (portrayed by Joshua Colley), from Peter Pan, is Harriet, Harry, CJ and Hazel's father. He is one of the attendees at Evie's 6th birthday party. In the novel Rise of the Isle of the Lost, he organizes a competition where he awards his old ship as a prize. In the film Descendants: The Rise of Red, a teen Hook appears in the past as part of Uliana's gang.

=== Introduced in Return to the Isle of the Lost ===
==== Descendants ====
Villain Kids

- Mad Maddy is the granddaughter of Madam Mim (The Sword in the Stone). She and Mal were best friends growing up.
- The Anti-Heroes Club, formed by Villain Kids who don't want to be like their parents, includes:
  - Hadie is the son of Hades (Hercules), and Mal's half-brother.
  - Artie is the son of King Arthur (The Sword in the Stone).
  - Eddie is the son of Edgar Balthazar (The Aristocats).
  - Hermie Bing is the daughter of The Ringmaster (Dumbo).
  - Big Murph is the son of one of the pirates of Captain Hook's crew (Peter Pan). Due to his name, he may be the son of Black Murphy.

Auradon Kids

- Tiger Peony is the daughter of Tiger Lily (Peter Pan).
- Pin is the son of Pinocchio (Pinocchio).
- Gordon is the son of Grumpy (Snow White and the Seven Dwarfs).
- Herkie is the son of Hercules and Megara (Hercules).

==== Disney classic characters ====
- Merlin (portrayed by Jeremy Swift), from The Sword in the Stone, is a wizard from Camelot Heights. In the film Descendants: The Rise of Red a younger Merlin appears in the past as the principal of Merlin Academy.
- Madam Mim, from The Sword in the Stone, is a witch who is Mad Maddy's grandmother, and Merlin's old rival.

=== Introduced in Rise of the Isle of the Lost ===
- Sophie is the intern of Yen Sid and Lonnie's childhood friend.
- Arabella is the niece of Ariel and the daughter of one of Ariel's sisters (The Little Mermaid).
- Li'l Shang is the son of Mulan and Li Shang (Mulan) and Lonnie's older brother.

=== Introduced in Escape from the Isle of the Lost ===
- Bobby Hood is the son of Robin Hood (Robin Hood), and the older brother of Robbie Hood.
- Ariana Rose is the snooty cousin of Audrey.

=== Introduced in Beyond the Isle of the Lost: Wonderland ===
- Chester is a relative of the Cheshire Cat (Alice in Wonderland), and a friend of Red and Ace.
- Ace is a friend of Red and Chester.
- The Duchess is the principal of Wonderland High. She is based on the character of Lewis Carroll's Alice's Adventures in Wonderland.
- Dora is the daughter of the Dormouse (Alice in Wonderland).
- Twee and Dee are the twin daughters of Tweedledee (Alice in Wonderland).
- Katy is the granddaughter of Caterpillar (Alice in Wonderland).
- Bill is the nephew of the Cook (based on the character of Lewis Carroll's Alice's Adventures in Wonderland).

== Introduced in Descendants: Wicked World ==
Characters introduced in the animated television series Descendants: Wicked World:

- Freddie Facilier (voiced by China Anne McClain in Season 1, Lauryn McClain in Season 2) is the eldest daughter of Dr. Facilier (The Princess and the Frog) and the older sister of Celia and Felix Facilier.
- Jordan (voiced by Ursula Taherian) is the daughter of the Genie (Aladdin) and the older sister of Jennie. She has the powers of a genie and possesses the magic lamp.
- Ally (voiced by Jennifer Veal) is the daughter of Alice (Alice in Wonderland). Her mother owns a tea shop.
- CJ Hook (voiced by Myrna Velasco) is the daughter of Captain Hook (Peter Pan). She appears as the antagonist of Wicked World and is mentioned in Rise of the Isle of the Lost. She is Harriet and Harry's younger sister, and Hazel's older sister.
- Zevon (voiced by Bradley Steven Perry) is the son of Yzma (The Emperor's New Groove), and the brother of Yzla and Zara. He is the main antagonist in the second season of Wicked World.
- Ruby is the daughter of Rapunzel and Eugene Fitzherbert (Tangled). Only her hair is seen, which is as long as her mother's. She also has a sister who was introduced in Descendants: School of Secrets.

== Introduced in School of Secrets book series ==
- Opal is the daughter of Mama Odie (The Princess and the Frog), introduced in Freddie's Shadow Cards.
- The Tweedledum and Tweedledee cousins are the sons of Tweedledum and Tweedledee (Alice in Wonderland), introduced in Ally's Mad Mystery.
- Yi-min is the daughter of Yao (Mulan), introduced in Lonnie's Warrior Sword.
- Carina Potts is the daughter of Mrs. Potts (Beauty and the Beast), as well as Chip and The Potts Sibling's sister, introduced in Carlos's Scavenger Hunt.
