= Descendants: Wicked Wonderland (soundtrack) =

Soundtrack album by Descendants cast
- Released: July 17, 2026
- Length: 36:24
- Label: Walt Disney

Singles from Descendants: Wicked Wonderland
- 1. "Perfect Princess" Released: June 11, 2026; 2. "Mad" Released: June 26, 2026; 3. "Dancing with the Enemy" Released: July 10, 2026

Descendants: Wicked Wonderland is a soundtrack album by the cast of the film of the same name, released on July 17, 2026, by Walt Disney Records. The soundtrack was announced on June 11, 2026, with the release of the lead single, "Perfect Princess".

== Background ==
The soundtrack was released on July 17, 2026, to accompany the release of its parent film. The soundtrack consists of 12 songs, including the soundtrack version of "Mad" performed by Leonardo Nam and Rita Ora, as well as "Mad – Wicked Wonderland" performed by Kylie Cantrall, Malia Baker, and Liamani. The third single, "Dancing with the Enemy" performed by Kylie Cantrall, Malia Baker, Liamani Segura and Kiara Romero was released on July 10, 2026.

== Live performances ==
On April 20, 2026, the debut performance of "Perfect Princess" was showcased on American Idol.

== Track listing ==
Descendants: Wicked Wonderland (Original Soundtrack) track listing
No.	Title	Writer(s)	Performer(s)	Length
1.	"Perfect Princess"	Michelle Zarlenga; Chantry Johnson; Mitch Allan	Kylie Cantrall; Malia Baker	3:43
2.	"Mad"	Michelle Zarlenga; Chantry Johnson; Mitch Allan	Leonardo Nam; Rita Ora	2:49
3.	"Did You Hear About Them"	Antonina Armato; Tim James; Thomas Armato Sturges; Adam Schmalholz	Alexandro Byrd; Kiara Romero	3:04
4.	"Dancing with the Enemy"	Antonina Armato; Tim James Price; Thomas Armato Sturges; Adam Schmalholz	Kylie Cantrall; Malia Baker; Liamani; Kiara Romero	2:56
5.	"For Once in My Life"	Jordan Powers; Josh Cumbee	Kylie Cantrall; Alexandro Byrd	3:02
6.	"The Girl I Used to Be"	Jaheem King Toombs	Rita Ora; Brandy Norwood	2:21
7.	"Heartless"	Antonina Armato; Tim James Price; Thomas Armato Sturges; Adam Schmalholz	Malia Baker; Brendon Tremblay	3:37
8.	"Who I Am"	Kari Kimmel	Kylie Cantrall; Liamani	2:03
9.	"Go Live It"	Matthew Tishler; Shridhar Solanki	Descendants Cast	3:03
10.	"True to Your Heart"	David Zippel; Matthew Wilder	Liamani	2:44
11.	"Mad – Wicked Wonderland"	Michelle Zarlenga; Chantry Johnson; Mitch Allan	Kylie Cantrall; Malia Baker; Liamani	1:33
12.	"Descendants: Wicked Wonderland – Score"	Torin Borrowdale	Torin Borrowdale	5:28
Total length:				36:24

== Commercial performance ==
On the Billboard Kid Albums chart, Descendants: Wicked Wonderland debuted at No. 1, becoming the fifth album from the Descendants franchise to top the chart. The album debuted at No. 2 on the Soundtracks chart and at No. 88 on the Billboard 200. As of August 2026, the Descendants: Wicked Wonderland soundtrack had accumulated 50.8 million streams worldwide.

== Charts ==
Chart performance for Descendants: Wicked Wonderland
Chart (2026)	Peak position
Belgian Albums (Ultratop Flanders)	114
Irish Compilation Albums (IRMA)	5
New Zealand Albums (RMNZ)	37
Portuguese Albums (AFP)	152
UK Compilation Albums (Official Charts)	3
UK Album Downloads (OCC)	21
UK Soundtrack Albums (Official Charts)	14
US Billboard 200	88
US Independent Albums (Billboard)	13
US Kid Albums (Billboard)	1
US Soundtrack Albums (Billboard)	2
