= Kylie Cantrall =

American actress (born 2005)

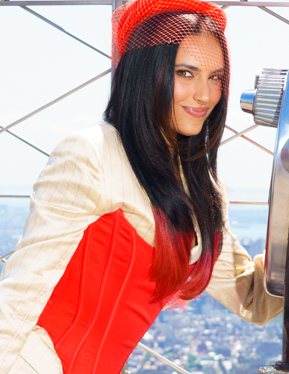
- Cantrall in 2026
- Born: Kylie Lorena Cantrall; June 25, 2005 (age 21); Los Angeles, California, U.S.
- Other name: Hello Kylie
- Occupations: Actress; singer; dancer; social media personality
- Years active: 2014–present
- Musical career
- Genres: Pop; R&B; teen pop
- Instrument: Vocals
- Labels: New Muzik Order; Artist Partner; Heroine; Republic

YouTube information
- Channel: Kylie Cantrall
- Years active: 2014–present
- Genres: Vlogs; music
- Subscribers: 847K
- Website: kyliecantrallofficial.com

Kylie Lorena Cantrall (born June 25, 2005) is an American actress and singer. She began her career in 2014 as a content creator on YouTube, where she would release covers and original music under the name "Hello Kylie".

In her acting career, among her most relevant roles she has played the lead role as Gabby Duran in the television series Gabby Duran & the Unsittables (2019–2021), a recurring role as Dani in the fourth season of High School Musical: The Musical: The Series (2023), and the lead role as Red in the Descendants films Descendants: The Rise of Red (2024) and Descendants: Wicked Wonderland (2026), among other media in the franchise. Among her voice roles, Cantrall voiced Savannah Meades in a lead role in the animated film Ron's Gone Wrong (2021), and White Tiger in a recurring role in the animated television series Spidey and His Amazing Friends (2024–present).

As a singer, Cantrall released her single "Switch Phones" in 2021 with Artist Partner Group and Heroine Music, later releasing her compilation album 10 Minute Song, Vol. 1 (2023), and her debut extended play B.O.Y. (2025). In 2025, she announced a partnership with Republic Records, and the following year released her major-label debut single "Carrie Bradshaw", which featured on her second extended play Valley Girl Problems.

== Early life ==
Cantrall's father is American music producer and songwriter Alex Cantrall, having written hits for Dru Hill and JoJo, while her mother Carol Borjas is a Venezuelan dancer and choreographer. Cantrall began learning how to dance at three years old, while also going with her father to recording sessions. She was in a dance competition in Las Vegas when she was seven years old. When she was eight, she watched the biopic Crazy Sexy Cool. She started researching the group TLC and became obsessed with their music.

== Career ==
With her father's help, Cantrall started a YouTube series "Hello Kylie", where she reviewed Disney Channel shows. She also started singing and performed on YouTube and musical.ly (now known as TikTok). In 2016, Cantrall was signed to a talent management agency. At the end of 2016, as Hello Kylie, she released her first single "Sleep Is 4 Suckas" alongside independent music label New Muzik Order, which was co-founded by her father. She also made guest appearances on Bizaardvark and Raven's Home.

At 13 years old, she was cast as the titular character in the television series Gabby Duran & the Unsittables. As a result, she left public school to focus on her career. In 2019, Gabby Duran & the Unsittables premiered on Disney Channel; she also performed the series' opening theme song, "I Do My Thing". The series was later cancelled in 2021. Also in 2021, Cantrall was featured in the music video of the R3hab song "Sad Boy" and voiced Savannah Meades in the animated film Ron's Gone Wrong, her film debut.

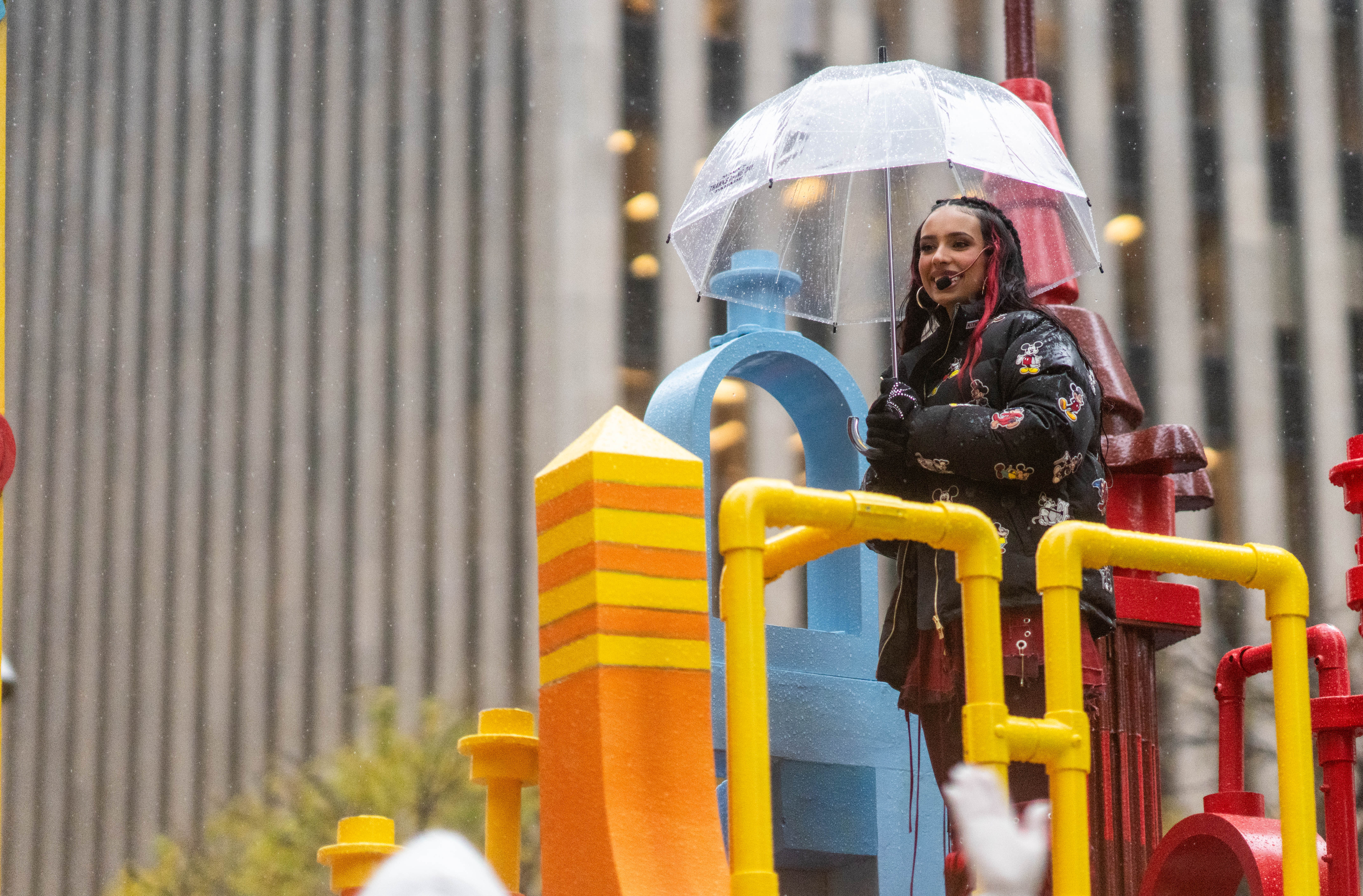
Cantrall at Macy's Thanksgiving Day Parade in 2024.

In September 2022, it was announced during the D23 Expo that Cantrall would be part of the main cast of the fourth installment in the Descendants film series, originally in the working title of Descendants 4, later being officially named Descendants: The Rise of Red. Cantrall was cast in the title role of Red, daughter of the Queen of Hearts (who was portrayed by Rita Ora). In the same month, it was announced that she would become a recurring cast member in the fourth season of High School Musical: The Musical: The Series.

In August 2023, Cantrall became the ambassador of TruSkin cosmetics brand, being the brand's first ambassador. In 2024, she started a recurring voice role as White Tiger in the animated television series Spidey and His Amazing Friends. In 2025, Cantrall released her debut extended play, B.O.Y., as well as filming for the fifth Descendants film, Descendants: Wicked Wonderland (2026).

Cantrall joined as a contestant in season fourteen of The Masked Singer. In the season, Cantrall served as "America's Insider", with her role of "Cat Witch" being known to the audience, but not the panelists. She finished in third place. After signing with Republic Records, Cantrall released "Carrie Bradshaw" in April 2026 as the lead single from EP Valley Girl Problems—which was released in July 2026. In August 2026, Cantrall announced she would embark on the Valley Girl Problems Tour in support of the EP, from September to October 2026.

On October 24, 2026, Cantrall sang the National Anthem before the second game of the World Series between the Tampa Bay Rays and Milwaukee Brewers at American Family Field in Milwaukee.

== Influences ==
Cantrall is influenced by 90s artists such as TLC, Britney Spears, Janet Jackson, and Aaliyah. She has also called Brandy, Mariah Carey and Beyoncé as well as Rosalía, Becky G, Laufey, Raye and Flo her favorite artists.

== Filmography ==
Key
†	Denotes films that have not yet been released

=== Film ===
Year	Title	Role	Notes
2021	Ron's Gone Wrong	Savannah Meades	Voice role; Film debut and voice acting debut
2024	Descendants: The Rise of Red	Red	Lead role; Disney+ original film
2024	Wickedly Sweet: A Descendants Short Story	Red	Voice role; short film
2025	Shuffle of Love: A Descendants Short Story	Red	Short film
2026	Descendants: Wicked Wonderland	Red	Lead role
2027	Zac Power †	Mica Bueno	Main voice role

=== Television ===
Year	Title	Role	Notes
2018	Bizaardvark	Tessa	Episode: "Paige is Wrong"
2018	Raven's Home	Jasmine	3 episodes: "Sleevemore Part One: Frozen"; "Sleevemore Part Two: Found"; "Sleevemore Part Three: Future"
2019–2021	Gabby Duran & the Unsittables	Gabby Duran	Lead role
2019	Just Roll with It	Zombie Musical Performer	Episode: "You Decide LIVE!"
2019	Disney Hall of Villains	Herself	Television special
2019	Disney Channel Holiday Party @ Walt Disney World	Herself	Television special; Live event
2020	Descendants Remix Dance Party	Herself	Television special
2021	Doogie Kameāloha, M.D.	Olivia	Episode: "Career Babes"
2023	High School Musical: The Musical: The Series	Dani	Recurring role (season 4)
2024–present	Spidey and His Amazing Friends	White Tiger	Voice role; Recurring role
2024	Spidey and His Amazing Friends	Adult Bug Enthusiast	Voice role; Episode: "Lizard's Buggy Bonanza"
2025	Cartoonified with Phineas and Ferb	Herself	Voice role; Episode: "Kylie Cantrall"
2026	The Masked Singer	Herself/Cat Witch	Contestant, also "America's Insider"
2026	Locker Diaries: Descendants	Red	Main role

== Discography ==
=== Extended plays ===
List of EPs and selected details
Title	Details
B.O.Y.	Released: May 7, 2025; Label: Artist Partner, Heroine; Format: CD, digital download, streaming
Valley Girl Problems	Released: July 24, 2026; Label: Republic, Artist Partner, Heroine; Format: CD, vinyl EP, digital download, streaming

=== Compilations ===
List of compilations and selected details
Title	Details
10 Minute Songs Vol. 1	Released: December 25, 2023; Label: Artist Partner, Heroine; Format: Digital download, streaming

=== Singles ===
==== As lead artist ====
List of singles as lead artist, showing year released and album name
Title	Year	Album
"Switch Phones"	2021	Non-album singles
"Texts Go Green"	2023	Non-album singles
"Santa Tell Me"	2023	Non-album singles
"Put the Record On"	2023	10 Minute Songs Vol. 1
"Elastic"	2024	Non-album singles
"Boo'd Up"	2024	Non-album singles
"Unsure" (with Alan Walker)	2024	Walkerworld 2.0
"Boy for a Day"	2024	B.O.Y.
"Goodie Bag"	2025	B.O.Y.
"Denim"	2025	B.O.Y.
"See U Tonight" (with Yunah & Minju from Illit)	2025	B.O.Y.
"Carrie Bradshaw"	2026	Valley Girl Problems

==== Promotional singles ====
List of promotional singles, showing year released and album name
Title	Year	Album
"Sleep Is 4 Suckas"	2016	Non-album singles
"Abraca Dab Bruh"	2016	Non-album singles
"Feature from Quavo"	2017	Non-album singles
"The Party Follows Me" (featuring Lexee Smith)	2017	Non-album singles
"Shake"	2017	Non-album singles
"That's What I'm Talkin' Bout"	2019	Non-album singles
"Feeling Some Kinda Way"	2019	Non-album singles
"I Do My Thing" (from Gabby Duran & the Unsittables)	2019	Non-album singles
"Calling All the Monsters"	2019	Non-album singles
"Sucker"	2019	Non-album singles
"No Reason"	2020	Non-album singles
"Red Christmas"	2024	Non-album singles
"Wickedly Sweet" (from Wickedly Sweet: A Descendants Short Story; with Dara Reneé, Ruby Rose Turner and Malia Baker)	2024	Non-album singles
"What's My Name (Red Version)" (with China Anne McClain)	2024	Descendants: The Rise of Red
"Red" (with Alex Boniello)	2024	Descendants: The Rise of Red

==== As featured artist ====
List of singles as featured artist, showing year released and album name
Title	Year	Album
"Sad Boy" (R3hab and Jonas Blue featuring Ava Max and Kylie Cantrall)	2021	Non-album single
"Glown Up" (Girlset & Kylie Cantrall)	2026	Non-album single

=== Other charted songs ===
List of other charted songs, showing year released and album name
Title	Year	Peak chart positions	Album
Title	Year	NZ Hot	Album
"Space Between"	2026	40	Valley Girl Problems

=== Guest appearances ===
List of other appearances, showing year released, other artist(s) credited and album name
Title	Year	Other artist(s)	Album
"Santa Claus Is Comin' to Town"	2019	—N/a	Disney Channel Holiday Hits 2019
"What's My Name (Dance Remix)"	2020	ZaZa	Descendants Remix Dance Party
"High School Musical"	2023	—N/a	High School Musical: The Musical: The Series: The Soundtrack: The Final Season
"Love Ain't It"	2024	Rita Ora, Brandy and Malia Baker	Descendants: The Rise of Red
"Fight of Our Lives"	2024	Malia Baker	Descendants: The Rise of Red
"Life Is Sweeter"	2024	Descendants – Cast	Descendants: The Rise of Red
"Life Is Sweeter (Reprise)"	2024	Rita Ora	Descendants: The Rise of Red
"Life Is Sweeter (Remix)"	2024	Descendants – Cast	Descendants: The Rise of Red
"Bad Reputation"	2024	—N/a	Descendants: The Rise of Red
"Red (Halloween Remix)"	2024	Alex Boniello	Descendants: The Rise of Red - Halloween EP
"Love Ain't It (Halloween Remix)"	2024	Rita Ora, Brandy and Malia Baker	Descendants: The Rise of Red - Halloween EP
"Fight of Our Lives (Halloween Remix)"	2024	Malia Baker	Descendants: The Rise of Red - Halloween EP
"Perfect Princess"	2026	Malia Baker	Descendants: Wicked Wonderland (soundtrack)
"Mad - Wicked Wonderland"	2026	Malia Baker, Liamani	Descendants: Wicked Wonderland (soundtrack)

=== Music videos ===
List of music videos, showing year released, other artist(s) credited and director(s)
Title	Year	Other artist(s)	Director(s)	Ref.
As lead artist
"Sleep Is 4 Suckas"	2016	None	Nayip Ramos	
"Abraca Dab Bruh"	2016	None	Nayip Ramos	
"The Party Follows Me"	2017	Lexee Smith	Sir Francis Michael	
"Shake"	2017	None	Nayip Ramos	
"That's What I'm Talkin' Bout"	2019	None	Unknown	
"Feeling Some Kinda Way"	2019	None	Unknown	
"I Do My Thing"	2019	None	Unknown	
"Calling All the Monsters"	2019	None	Unknown	
"Sucker"	2019	None	Unknown	
"My Favorite Things"	2019	None	Unknown	
"No Reason"	2020	None	Unknown	
"What's My Name (Dance Remix)"	2020	ZaZa	Unknown	
"Switch Phones" (Dance Video)	2021	None	Unknown	
"High School Musical"	2023	None	Unknown	
"Texts Go Green" (Dance Battle)	2023	None	Mary Mason	
"Santa Tell Me"	2023	None	Nayip Ramos	
"Elastic" (Dance Video)	2024	None	Mary Mason and Kylie Cantrall	
"What's My Name (Red Version)"	2024	China Anne McClain	Jennifer Phang	
"Unsure"	2024	Alan Walker	Anders Øvergaard and Erik Bergamini	
"Red"	2024	Alex Boniello	Jennifer Phang	
"Love Ain't It"	2024	Rita Ora, Brandy and Malia Baker	Jennifer Phang	
"Fight of Our Lives"	2024	Malia Baker	Jennifer Phang	
"Life Is Sweeter"	2024	Descendants – Cast	Jennifer Phang	
As featured artist
"Sad Boy"	2021	R3hab, Jonas Blue and Ava Max	Noah Sterling	

== Tours ==
=== Headlining ===
- The Valley Girl Problems Tour (2026)

=== Co-headlining ===
- Descendants/Zombies: Worlds Collide Tour (2025) featuring Cantrall, Freya Skye, Malia Baker, Malachi Barton, Dara Reneé, Joshua Colley and Mekonnen Knife.

== Awards and nominations ==
Award	Year	Category	Recipient(s) and nominee(s)	Result	Ref.
Nickelodeon Kids' Choice Awards	2025	Favorite Butt-Kicker	Princess Red	Nominated	
Gracie Awards	2025	Best Ensemble Cast in Family Programming	Descendants: The Rise of Red	Won	
