= Descendants (franchise) =

American film series

- Created by: Josann McGibbon; Sara Parriott
- Owner: The Walt Disney Company
- Years: 2015–present
- Based on: Animated films by Walt Disney Animation Studios

Print publications
- Novels: List of novels

Films and television
- Short films: Under the Sea (2018); Audrey's Royal Return (2019); Wicked Woods (2019); Wickedly Sweet (2024); Shuffle of Love (2025)
- Television series: Descendants: School of Secrets (2015); Locker Diaries: Descendants (2026)
- Animated series: Descendants: Wicked World (2015–2017); Descendants: The Planning of the Royal Wedding (2020)
- Television specials: Descendants Remix Dance Party (2020); Descendants: The Royal Wedding (2021)
- Television films: Descendants (2015); Descendants 2 (2017); Descendants 3 (2019); Descendants: The Rise of Red (2024); Descendants: Wicked Wonderland (2026)

Theatrical presentations
- Musicals: Descendants: The Musical (2020–present); Descendants/Zombies: Worlds Collide Tour (2025); Descendants/Zombies/Camp Rock: Worlds Collide Concert Tour (2026-2027)

Games
- Video game: Descendants (2015)

Audio
- Soundtracks: Descendants (2015); Descendants 2 (2017); Descendants 3 (2019); Descendants: The Rise of Red (2024); Descendants: Wicked Wonderland (2026)

Descendants is an American media franchise centered on a series of Disney Channel musical fantasy films. The franchise was created by Josann McGibbon and Sara Parriott, with the first three films directed by Kenny Ortega, the fourth directed by Jennifer Phang, and the fifth directed by Kimmy Gatewood.

The Descendants franchise is set in a universe that continues the narratives of Disney's animated classic films. The series stars Dove Cameron, Cameron Boyce, Sofia Carson, and Booboo Stewart, and each film follows the lives of the teenage children of four Disney Villains who reside on the Isle of the Lost. They are invited to the kingdom of Auradon by the teenage son of Queen Belle and King Beast. The first film premiered as a Disney Channel Original Movie in July 31, 2015. Due to its success, a sequel was produced and premiered across six Disney-owned networks in July 21, 2017. The third film debuted on Disney Channel in August 2, 2019. A spin-off film to the previous three, Descendants: The Rise of Red, starring Kylie Cantrall and Malia Baker, was released on Disney+ on July 12, 2024, which was followed by a sequel, Descendants: Wicked Wonderland, released in July 16, 2026.

The film series also led to the creation of several television series, short films, television specials, novels, and comic books.

== Development ==
=== Origin ===
Sara Parriott and Josann McGibbon came up with the idea for the Descendants franchise after being approached by a former assistant, who had become a development executive at Disney Channel. They were asked to create a story centered on the teenage children of Disney's iconic villains, which led to the development of the Descendants series. Parriott and McGibbon developed the concept for Descendants by proposing that four children of iconic Disney villains attend school in the idealized fairyland of Auradon, rather than in a school solely for villains' children. They selected the featured characters based on their favorite Disney films, focusing on human villains, and decided to include two male and two female teens. This approach also led to creative exploration of how these notorious villains, such as Maleficent and the Evil Queen, might parent their offspring.

=== Production ===
Descendants 2 was announced on August 15, 2015, at the D23 Expo. The film premiered on July 21, 2017, and was simulcast on six channels: ABC, Disney Channel, Disney XD, Freeform, Lifetime, and Lifetime Movies.

Descendants 3 was announced on February 16, 2018. The film premiered on August 2, 2019 on Disney Channel.

In September 2021, Deadline Hollywood reported that two more Descendants films were being developed by Disney.

On May 10, 2022, a new sequel, initially announced under the title of Descendants: The Pocketwatch, was greenlit for Disney+, with Jennifer Phang attached to direct. On March 21, 2023, the official title for the film was announced as Descendants: The Rise of Red. The film was released on July 12, 2024 on Disney+, and is set to premiere on August 9, 2024 on Disney Channel. The film, serving as a spin-off of the previous three films, centers on Red, the teenage daughter of the Queen of Hearts, and Chloe, the daughter of Cinderella and Prince Charming, teaming up and traveling back in time to prevent a catastrophic event.

On February 2025 were announced the first cast members for the fifth film, in May of the same year the film's official title being announced as Descendants: Wicked Wonderland.

On August 7, 2026, Disney Channel greenlit Hidden Heroes: A Descendants Story, a new film focused on the Disney sidekicks' descendants.

== Film series ==
Film	U.S. release date	Director	Writer(s)	Composer(s)	Producer(s)
Main series
Descendants	July 31, 2015	Kenny Ortega	Josann McGibbon and Sara Parriott	David Lawrence	Wendy Japhet and Kenny Ortega
Descendants 2	July 21, 2017	Kenny Ortega	Josann McGibbon and Sara Parriott	David Lawrence	Wendy Japhet, Josann McGibbon, Sara Parriott and Kenny Ortega
Descendants 3	August 2, 2019	Kenny Ortega	Josann McGibbon and Sara Parriott	David Lawrence	Wendy Japhet, Josann McGibbon, Sara Parriott and Kenny Ortega
Descendants: The Rise of Red	August 9, 2024	Jennifer Phang	Dan Frey and Ru Sommer	Torin Borrowdale	Suzanne Todd and Gary Marsh
Descendants: Wicked Wonderland	July 16, 2026	Kimmy Gatewood	Tamara Chestna, Dan Frey and Ru Sommer	Torin Borrowdale	Suzanne Todd and Gary Marsh
Spin-off
Hidden Heroes: A Descendants Story	2027	Jude Weng	Tamara Chestna, Eydie Faye and Emma Fletcher	TBA	Mark Ordesky, Jane Fleming, Gary Marsh, and Tamara Chestna

=== Main series ===
==== Descendants (2015) ====
In the United States of Auradon, Belle and Beast rule as king and queen, twenty years after they married, united the settings of many Disney animated films, and banished all villains to the Isle of the Lost, a slum surrounded by a magic-suppressing barrier. Beast plans to abdicate in favor of his and Belle's son, Ben, who announces a program to invite four children from the Isle of the Lost (dubbed as "Villains' Kids" or "VKs") to live in Auradon, away from the influence of their villainous parents: Carlos, son of Cruella de Vil; Jay, son of Jafar; Evie, daughter of the Evil Queen; and their gang's leader Mal, daughter of Maleficent. Maleficent orders them to steal the Fairy Godmother's magic wand and deactivate the barrier, so Maleficent can conquer Auradon. The four VKs find themselves fitting in and enjoying a normal childhood, and Mal begins a relationship with Ben, supplanting Audrey, daughter of Princess Aurora and Prince Phillip. When the barrier is inadvertently dispelled, Maleficent attacks Ben's coronation and transforms into a dragon. With Ben encouraging her to make her own choice, Mal decides to be good. She and her friends rebuke Maleficent, turning her into a small lizard, from which state she can recover if she fills her heart with love. The people of Auradon celebrate.

==== Descendants 2 (2017) ====
Mal struggles with her new celebrity life as Ben's girlfriend, secretly using magic to maintain a lifestyle she feels is a façade. Mal decides that she does not belong in Auradon; she returns to the Isle, where gang leadership has fallen to her old rival, pirate captain Uma (Ursula's daughter), and her first and second mates, Harry (Captain Hook's son) and Gil (Gaston's son), respectively. Evie, Jay, and Carlos agree to help Ben find Mal, but Mal rejects Ben, believing it to be best for him and Auradon that she stays on the Isle. Uma captures Ben and demands the Fairy Godmother's wand in exchange for his life. Uma resents not being chosen to live in Auradon; Ben respects her as a leader and invites her to Auradon, but she vows to make her own way there instead. Using a 3D-printed decoy wand, Mal's group rescues Ben. At the shipboard royal cotillion, Uma appears as Ben's date and he announces he will destroy the barrier; Mal realizes Uma has cast a spell on Ben. When Mal discovers Ben commissioned a portrait that depicts her as she was before she changed herself with magic, she accepts the act of love and kisses Ben, breaking the spell. Uma and Mal battle, transforming into an octopus and a dragon, respectively. Ben tries to negotiate with Uma, but she leaves, unreconciled. Evie asks to bring more children from the Isle to Auradon and Ben agrees.

==== Descendants 3 (2019) ====
While Mal, Evie, Jay and Carlos are recruiting a new generation of villain kids, Hades is trying to breach through the barrier, being stopped by Mal. Later, Ben proposes to Mal, making her the future queen of Auradon. Then Audrey steals Maleficent's scepter and the queen's crown and becomes an evil version of herself. The VKs return to the Isle of the Lost on a mission to retrieve Hades' ember and later, Uma, Harry and Gil team up with Mal and the others to stop Audrey from destroying Auradon.

==== Descendants: The Rise of Red (2024) ====
Red, daughter of the Queen of Hearts, and Chloe, daughter of Cinderella, must travel back in time to prevent Red's mother from seizing control of Auradon and becoming a villain. The Queen of Hearts coerces Red into punishing Cinderella as part of her revenge for a prank played on her during her student days at Auradon, then known as Merlin Academy. Red and Chloe's mission focuses on stopping Uliana from pranking Bridget, the younger version of the Queen of Hearts, which would lead her to become an evil queen. Their successful intervention preserves the present, transforming the Queen of Hearts into a loving figure. The film concludes with a cliffhanger, as Uma's voiceover delivers closing lines amidst a scene of general merriment and dancing.

==== Descendants: Wicked Wonderland (2026) ====
After the release of The Rise of Red, the film's executive producer Suzanne Todd confirmed that Disney is "definitely working on and thinking about a follow-up movie," and that due to the end of The Rise of Red with a warning about the unforeseen consequences of time travel, in the sequel "there will be future good and evil turns for sure."

In February 2025, the first cast members were announced, with several characters from The Rise of Red returning and new ones joining, with the film scheduled for release in summer 2026. In March 2025, more new cast members were announced. In May 2025, the film's official title was announced as Descendants: Wicked Wonderland, along with the announcement of most of the adult cast from The Rise of Red reprising their roles.

=== Spin-off ===
==== Hidden Heroes: A Descendants Story (2027) ====
In 2026, was announced Hidden Heroes: A Descendants Story, a film focused on the descendants of Disney characters' sidekicks, who at the Sidekick Academy are challenged to join the elite ranks of partners to heroes, but when a villainous duo comes to the academy, a group of fresh recruits must band together to save the realm.

== Cast members ==
List indicators

This section includes characters who will appear or have appeared in the franchise.

- An empty grey cell indicates the character was not in the film, or that the character's official presence has not yet been confirmed.
- ^{A} indicates an appearance through archival footage or audio.
- ^{C} indicates a cameo role.
- ^{V} indicates a voice-only role.
- ^{Y} indicates a younger version of the character.

Characters	Main series					Spin-off
Characters	Descendants	Descendants 2	Descendants 3	Descendants The Rise of Red	Descendants Wicked Wonderland	Hidden Heroes A Descendants Story
Characters	2015	2017	2019	2024	2026	2027
Mal	Dove Cameron	Dove Cameron	Dove Cameron	Dove Cameron^{A}		
Carlos de Vil	Cameron Boyce	Cameron Boyce	Cameron Boyce	Cameron Boyce^{A}		
Jay	Booboo Stewart	Booboo Stewart	Booboo Stewart	Booboo Stewart^{A}		
Evie	Sofia Carson	Sofia Carson	Sofia Carson	Sofia Carson^{A}		
Ben	Mitchell Hope	Mitchell Hope	Mitchell Hope	Mitchell Hope^{A}		
Fairy Godmother / Fay	Melanie Paxson	Melanie Paxson	Melanie Paxson	Melanie Paxson Grace Narducci^{Y}	Melanie Paxson	Melanie Paxson
Jane	Brenna D'Amico	Brenna D'Amico	Brenna D'Amico			
Audrey	Sarah Jeffery		Sarah Jeffery	Sarah Jeffery^{A}		
Doug	Zachary Gibson	Zachary Gibson	Zachary Gibson			
Chad Charming	Jedidiah Goodacre	Jedidiah Goodacre	Jedidiah Goodacre	Jedidiah Goodacre^{A}		
Lonnie	Dianne Doan	Dianne Doan				
King Beast	Dan Payne	Dan Payne	Dan Payne			
Queen Belle	Keegan Connor Tracy	Keegan Connor Tracy	Keegan Connor Tracy			
Cruella de Vil	Wendy Raquel Robinson					
Jafar	Maz Jobrani					
Evil Queen	Kathy Najimy					
Maleficent	Kristin Chenoweth			Mars^{Y}		
Dude	Paisley	Paisley Bobby Moynihan^{V}	Paisley Bobby Moynihan^{V}			
Queen Leah	Judith Maxie		Judith Maxie			
Snow White	Stephanie Bennett					
Harry Hook		Thomas Doherty	Thomas Doherty			
Gil		Dylan Playfair	Dylan Playfair			
Dizzy Tremaine		Anna Cathcart	Anna Cathcart			
Uma		China Anne McClain	China Anne McClain	China Anne McClain		
Lumière		Jan Bos				Sean Yves Lessard
Celia Facilier			Jadah Marie			
Hades			Cheyenne Jackson	Anthony Pyatt^{Y}		
Lady Tremaine		Uncredited^{V}	Linda Ko	Julee Cerda^{Y}		
Squeaky Smee			Christian Convery		Ryan McEwen	
Squirmy Smee			Luke Roessler		Dayton Paradis	
Dr. Facilier			Jamal Sims			
Mr. Smee			Faustino Di Bauda			
Red				Kylie Cantrall	Kylie Cantrall Emilia Gomez^{Y}	
Chloe Charming				Malia Baker	Malia Baker	Malia Baker
Uliana				Dara Reneé		
Queen of Hearts / Bridget				Rita Ora Ruby Rose Turner^{Y}	Rita Ora Ruby Rose Turner^{Y}^{C}	
Queen Cinderella / Ella	Uncredited^{C}	Uncredited^{C}		Brandy Norwood Morgan Dudley^{Y}	Brandy Norwood Morgan Dudley^{Y}^{C}	
Hook				Joshua Colley		
Maddox Hatter				Leonardo Nam	Leonardo Nam	
King Charming / Prince Charming	Uncredited^{C}	Uncredited^{C}		Paolo Montalban Tristan Padil^{Y}	Paolo Montalban	
Principal Merlin				Jeremy Swift		
Morgie				Peder Lindell		
Aladdin	Uncredited^{C}	Uncredited^{C}		Levin Valayil Kabir Bery^{Y}		
Jasmine	Uncredited^{C}	Uncredited^{C}		Shazia Pascal Aiza Azaar^{Y}		
Pink					Liamani Segura Brielle Celis^{Y}	
Max Hatter					Brendon Tremblay Avery Onyx Hargrave^{Y}	
Luis Madrigal					Alexandro Byrd	
Hazel Hook					Kiara Romero	
Robbie Hood					Joel Oulette	
Felix Facilier					Zavien Garrett	
Chessy Cheshire					Awkwafina^{V}	
Kronk Jr.						Jacob Rodriguez
Jennie						Dior Goodjohn
Zara						Momona Tamada
Meri						Eva Fossaceca Smedley
Lou						Harry Jones
Scratch Potts						Connor Wong
Nic Potts						Kyra Wong
Jiminy Cricket						Darren Criss
Yzma						Sherry Cola
Genie						James Monroe Iglehart
Kronk						Hugo Ateo
Yen Sid						Dan Bakkedahl

== Reception ==
As of August 2024, the original Descendants trilogy—Descendants, Descendants 2, and Descendants 3 —has accumulated over 781 million hours of viewing in the United States, where each film was also the most-watched television movie of the year among Kids 6-11 and Tweens 9-14 during its premiere year in 2015, 2017, and 2019, respectively.

=== Descendants (2015) ===
Descendants was viewed more than one million times on the Watch Disney Channel app before the film made its TV debut. It was viewed by 6.6 million people on its premiere night and 10.5 million viewers in Early DVR Playback. Shortly after the premier air date, ratings showed the film was the fifth most watched original movie in cable history. In Australia, the film attracted 151,000 viewers, making it the sixth highest-rated broadcast on pay television on its premiere day. The British premiere was watched by 827,000 viewers, making it the most-watched broadcast on Disney Channel of that week and month.

Descendants has grossed $18,245,955 in domestic home video sales.

=== Descendants 2 (2017) ===
Descendants 2 was viewed by 8.92 million viewers across six networks on the night of its premiere, up from its predecessor in 2015; at least 13 million people watched a minute of the film. On Disney Channel, the film was watched by 5.33 million viewers, and topped the night on cable television, receiving a 1.20 rating. Although down from the first film, it was the most-viewed telecast on the network since the first film. ABC's broadcast of the film received a 0.6/3 rating/share, drawing 2.41 million viewers; 0.47 million viewers watched the film on Disney XD with a 0.12 rating, 0.30 million viewers watched the film on Lifetime with a 0.09 rating, 0.26 million viewers watched the film on Freeform with a 0.08 rating, and 0.15 million viewers watched the film on Lifetime Movies with a 0.05 rating. In delayed viewing, the film rose to a total of 21 million viewers. On Disney Channel, the film placed second in the week of its DVR ratings, jumping 92% to a 2.3 rating, and topped the week in viewer gains, jumping 104% with an additional 5.54 million viewers, the biggest viewer gain on cable television in two years, totaling to 10.90 million viewers on Disney Channel. On Freeform, the film jumped 207% with an additional 0.54 million viewers, totaling to 0.80 million viewers on the network; on Lifetime Movie Network, the film gained 96% with an additional 0.14 million viewers, totaling to 0.29 million viewers on the network.

Descendants 2 has grossed $13,314,855 in domestic home video sales.

=== Descendants 3 (2019) ===
Descendants 3 was watched by 4.59 million viewers on its August 2, 2019 premiere, with viewership increasing to 8.43 million viewers after three days of delayed viewing.

Descendants 3 has grossed $6,968,947 in domestic home video sales.

=== Descendants: The Rise of Red (2024) ===
Descendants: The Rise of Red was watched by 6.7 million viewers in its first three days of streaming on Disney+. It became Disney Branded Television's highest original movie premiere on the streaming service. The film was the most watched streaming original movie during the week of 12–18 July 2024, with 1.1 billion minutes of watch time. It was the third most watched streaming original movie during the week of 19–25 July 2024, with 299.1 million minutes of watch time. The Rise of Red was the fourth most watched streaming original movie during the week of 26 July – August 1, 2024, with 141.8 million minutes of watch time and 1.5 million views. According to FlixPatrol, which monitors daily updated VOD charts across the globe, the movie reached Disney+'s number one film ranking in the United States on July 27, 2024, and reached number two on August 11, 2024. Analytics company Samba TV, which gathers viewership data from certain Smart TVs and content providers, reported that The Rise of Red was the eighth top streaming programs for the week of August 5–11, 2024. In August 2024, Disney announced that The Rise of Red has reached 20 million views worldwide.

=== Descendants: Wicked Wonderland (2026) ===
Descendants: Wicked Wonderland was watched by 7.5 million viewers in its first three days of streaming on Disney+.It became Disney Branded Television's highest original movie premiere on the streaming service, surpassing its predecessor. The film was the most watched streaming original movie during its initial tracking week, picking up 359,000 views in major tracking metrics. According to platform VOD charts, the movie reached Disney+'s number one film ranking globally, dethroning Avatar: Fire and Ash after its 25-day streak.

== Impact ==
In 2020, Robot Chicken parodied Descendants by having X-23, the clone of Wolverine, appear at the school attended by the children of Disney villains. As of May 2022, nearly 7 million dolls and 9 million Descendants books, including four New York Times Best Sellers, have been sold. The Descendants Halloween costumes were the #1 and #2 best-selling costumes in 2015 and 2016 and have remained among Disney's top 5 licensed costumes for seven consecutive years, from 2015 to 2021. In July 2024, the hashtag "#Descendants" has garnered more than 95 million views in the United States and over 9 billion views globally. As of August 2024, Descendants' official Disney accounts have accumulated over 10 million followers across various social media platforms.

== Discography ==
=== Soundtrack albums ===
List of albums, with selected chart positions
Title	Album details	Peak chart positions										Certifications
Title	Album details	US	US OST	AUS	BEL	FRA	GER	ITA	NL	NZ	SPA	Certifications
Descendants	Released: July 31, 2015; Formats: CD, digital download, streaming; Label: Walt Disney	1	1	57	178	102	50	19	50	—	36	RIAA: Gold
Descendants 2	Released: July 21, 2017; Formats: CD, digital download, streaming; Label: Walt Disney	6	1	64	192	135	—	—	—	— (Note: Descendants 2 did not enter the NZ Top 40 Albums Chart, but peaked at number 6 on the NZ Heatseekers Albums Chart.)	53	RIAA: Gold
Descendants 3	Released: August 2, 2019; Formats: CD, digital download, streaming; Label: Walt Disney	7	1	36	109	166	—	—	—	—	82	RIAA: Gold
Descendants: The Rise of Red	Released: July 12, 2024; Formats: Digital download, streaming; Label: Walt Disney	60	1	—	—	—	—	—	—	—	—	
Descendants: Wicked Wonderland	Released: July 17, 2026; Formats: Digital download, streaming; Label: Walt Disney	88	—	—	—	—	—	—	—	—	—	
"—" denotes releases that did not chart or were not released in that territory.

=== Karaoke albums ===
List of karaoke albums and selected details
Title	Details
Disney Karaoke Series: The Best of Descendants	Released: May 24, 2017; Label: Walt Disney; Format: CD, CD+G
Disney Karaoke Series: Descendants: The Rise of Red	Released: September 27, 2024; Label: Walt Disney; Format: Digital download, streaming

=== Extended plays ===
List of EPs and selected details
Title	Details
Disney Karaoke Series: Descendants	Released: January 1, 2015; Label: Walt Disney; Format: Digital download, streaming
Disney Karaoke Series: Descendants 2	Released: July 21, 2017; Label: Walt Disney; Format: Digital download, streaming
Descendants Remix Dance Party	Released: April 3, 2020; Label: Walt Disney; Format: Digital download, streaming
Descendants: The Rise of Red - Halloween EP	Released: September 27, 2024; Label: Walt Disney; Format: Digital download, streaming

=== Singles ===
Title	Year	Peak chart positions				Certifications	Album
Title	Year	US	CAN	FRA	UK	Certifications	Album
"If Only" (performed by Dove Cameron)	2015	94	—	186	—	RIAA: Platinum	Descendants
"Rotten to the Core" (performed by Sofia Carson)	2015	— (Note: "Rotten to the Core" did not enter the Billboard Hot 100, but peaked at number 5 on the Bubbling Under Hot 100 Singles chart.)	—	—	—		Descendants
"Ways to Be Wicked" (performed by Dove Cameron, Sofia Carson, Cameron Boyce and Booboo Stewart)	2017	— (Note: "Ways to Be Wicked" did not enter the Billboard Hot 100, but peaked at number 1 on the Bubbling Under Hot 100 Singles chart.)	—	—	—	RIAA: Platinum	Descendants 2
"What's My Name" (performed by China Anne McClain, Thomas Doherty and Dylan Playfair)	2017	61	94	—	39	RIAA: 2× Platinum	Descendants 2
"Chillin' Like a Snowman" (performed by Sofia Carson)	2017	—	—	—	—		Non-album singles
"Stronger" (performed by Dove Cameron and China Anne McClain)	2018	—	—	—	—		Non-album singles
"Good to Be Bad" (performed by Dove Cameron, Sofia Carson, Cameron Boyce, Booboo Stewart, Jadah Marie and Anna Cathcart)	2019	—	—	—	—	RIAA: Gold	Descendants 3
"VK Mashup" (performed by Dove Cameron, Sofia Carson, Cameron Boyce and Booboo Stewart)	2019	—	—	—	—		Descendants 3
"Queen of Mean" (performed by Sarah Jeffery)	2019	49	57	—	89	RIAA: 2× Platinum	Descendants 3
"What's My Name (Red Version)" (performed by China Anne McClain and Kylie Cantrall)	2024	—	—	—	—		Descendants: The Rise of Red
"Red" (performed by Kylie Cantrall and Alex Boniello)	2024	—	—	—	—		Descendants: The Rise of Red
"Perfect Princess" (performed by Kylie Cantrall and Malia Baker)	2026	—	—	—	—		Descendants: Wicked Wonderland
"Mad - Wicked Wonderland" (performed by Kylie Cantrall, Malia Baker, and Liamani Segura)	2026	—	—	—	—		Descendants: Wicked Wonderland
"—" denotes releases that did not chart or were not released in that territory.

=== Promotional singles ===
Title	Year	Peak chart positions		Album
Title	Year	US	US KDS	Album
"Believe" (performed by Shawn Mendes)	2015	—	1	Descendants
"Genie in a Bottle" (performed by Dove Cameron)	2016	— (Note: "Genie in a Bottle" did not enter the Billboard Hot 100, but peaked at number 11 on the Bubbling Under Hot 100 Singles chart.)	—	Non-album promotional singles
"I'm Your Girl" (performed by Dove Cameron and Sofia Carson)	2016	—	—	Non-album promotional singles
"Rather Be With You" (performed by Dove Cameron, Sofia Carson, Lauryn McClain and Brenna D'Amico)	2016	—	—	Descendants 2
"Evil" (performed by Dove Cameron)	2016	—	—	Descendants 2
"Better Together" (performed by Dove Cameron and Sofia Carson)	2017	—	—	Descendants 2
"Keep Your Head on Halloween" (performed by Cast - Descendants)	2019	—	—	Non-album promotional singles
"Audrey's Christmas Rewind" (performed by Sarah Jeffery and Jadah Marie)	2019	—	—	Non-album promotional singles
"Feeling the Love" (performed by Cast of Descendants: The Royal Wedding)	2021	—	—	Non-album promotional singles
"Red Christmas" (performed by Kylie Cantrall)	2024	—	—	Non-album promotional singles
"Wickedly Sweet" (performed by Kylie Cantrall, Dara Reneé, Ruby Rose Turner and Malia Baker)	2024	—	—	Non-album promotional singles
"—" denotes releases that did not chart or were not released in that territory.

=== Other charted songs ===
Title	Year	Peak chart positions		Certifications	Album
Title	Year	US	CAN	Certifications	Album
"Rotten to the Core" (performed by Dove Cameron, Cameron Boyce, Booboo Stewart and Sofia Carson)	2015	38	66	RIAA: Platinum	Descendants
"Evil Like Me" (performed by Dove Cameron and Kristin Chenoweth)	2015	— (Note: "Evil Like Me" did not enter the Billboard Hot 100, but peaked at number 12 on the Bubbling Under Hot 100 Singles chart.)	—	RIAA: Gold	Descendants
"Did I Mention" (performed by Jeff Lewis)	2015	— (Note: "Did I Mention" did not enter the Billboard Hot 100, but peaked at number 2 on the Bubbling Under Hot 100 Singles chart.)	—		Descendants
"Set it Off" (performed by Dove Cameron, Sofia Carson, Cameron Boyce, Booboo Stewart, Mitchell Hope, Sarah Jeffery and Jeff Lewis)	2015	— (Note: "Set it Off" did not enter the Billboard Hot 100, but peaked at number 6 on the Bubbling Under Hot 100 Singles chart.)	—		Descendants
"Chillin' Like a Villain" (performed by Sofia Carson, Cameron Boyce, Booboo Stewart and Mitchell Hope)	2017	95	—	RIAA: Platinum	Descendants 2
"It's Goin' Down" (performed by Dove Cameron, Sofia Carson, Cameron Boyce, Booboo Stewart, China Anne McClain, Mitchell Hope, Thomas Doherty and Dylan Playfair)	2017	77	—	RIAA: Platinum	Descendants 2
"You and Me" (performed by Dove Cameron, Sofia Carson, Cameron Boyce, Booboo Stewart, Mitchell Hope and Jeff Lewis)	2017	— (Note: "You and Me" did not enter the Billboard Hot 100, but peaked at number 20 on the Bubbling Under Hot 100 Singles chart.)	—	RIAA: Gold	Descendants 2
"Night Falls" (performed by Dove Cameron, Sofia Carson, Cameron Boyce, Booboo Stewart, China Anne McClain, Thomas Doherty and Dylan Playfair)	2019	84	—	RIAA: Platinum	Descendants 3
"—" denotes releases that did not chart or were not released in that territory.

=== Guest appearances ===
Title	Year	Performed by	Album
"Jolly to the Core"	2016	Dove Cameron, Sofia Carson, Cameron Boyce and Booboo Stewart	Disney Channel Holiday Hits

=== Music videos ===
Title	Year	Artist(s)	Director(s)	Ref.
"Believe"	2015	Shawn Mendes	Jake Kasdan	
"Rotten to the Core"	2015	Dove Cameron, Cameron Boyce, Booboo Stewart and Sofia Carson	Kenny Ortega	
"If Only"	2015	Dove Cameron	Kenny Ortega	
"Evil Like Me"	2015	Kristin Chenoweth and Dove Cameron	Kenny Ortega	
"Set it Off"	2015	Dove Cameron, Sofia Carson, Cameron Boyce, Booboo Stewart, Mitchell Hope, Sarah Jeffery and Jeff Lewis	Kenny Ortega	
"Be Our Guest"	2015	Mitchell Hope, Spencer Lee, Kala Balch and Marco Marinangeli	Kenny Ortega	
"Did I Mention"	2015	Mitchell Hope	Kenny Ortega	
"Rotten to the Core (Single Version)"	2015	Sofia Carson	Naren Wilks and Adam Santelli	
"Good Is the New Bad"	2015	Dove Cameron, Sofia Carson and China Anne McClain	Aliki Theofilopoulos	
"Genie in a Bottle"	2016	Dove Cameron	Jay Martin	
"I'm Your Girl"	2016	Dove Cameron and Sofia Carson	Aliki Theofilopoulos	
"Night Is Young"	2016	China Anne McClain	Aliki Theofilopoulos	
"Rather Be with You"	2016	Dove Cameron, Sofia Carson, Lauryn McClain and Brenna D'Amico	Eric Fogel	
"Jolly to the Core"	2016	Dove Cameron, Sofia Carson, Cameron Boyce and Booboo Stewart	Unknown	
"Evil"	2016	Dove Cameron	Eric Fogel	
"Better Together"	2017	Dove Cameron and Sofia Carson	Eric Fogel	
"Ways to Be Wicked"	2017	Dove Cameron, Sofia Carson, Cameron Boyce and Booboo Stewart	Kenny Ortega	
"What's My Name"	2017	China Anne McClain, Thomas Doherty and Dylan Playfair	Kenny Ortega	
"It's Goin' Down"	2017	Dove Cameron, Sofia Carson, Cameron Boyce, Booboo Stewart, China Anne McClain, Mitchell Hope, Thomas Doherty and Dylan Playfair	Kenny Ortega	
"Space Between"	2017	Dove Cameron and Sofia Carson	Kenny Ortega	
"You and Me"	2017	Dove Cameron, Sofia Carson, Cameron Boyce, Booboo Stewart, Mitchell Hope and Jeff Lewis	Kenny Ortega	
"Chillin' Like a Villain"	2017	Sofia Carson, Cameron Boyce, Booboo Stewart and Mitchell Hope	Kenny Ortega	
"Stronger"	2018	Dove Cameron and China Anne McClain	Scott Rhea	
"Good to be Bad"	2019	Dove Cameron, Cameron Boyce, Sofia Carson and Booboo Stewart	Kenny Ortega	
"VK Mashup"	2019	Dove Cameron, Cameron Boyce, Sofia Carson and Booboo Stewart	Kenny Ortega	
"Break This Down"	2019	Dove Cameron, Sofia Carson, Booboo Stewart, Cameron Boyce, China Anne McClain, Mitchell Hope, Thomas Doherty, Dylan Playfair, Sarah Jeffery, Jadah Marie, Brenna D'Amico and Zachary Gibson	Kenny Ortega	
"Do What You Gotta Do"	2019	Dove Cameron and Cheyenne Jackson	Kenny Ortega	
"One Kiss"	2019	Dove Cameron, Sofia Carson and China Anne McClain	Kenny Ortega	
Night Falls	2019	Dove Cameron, Sofia Carson, Cameron Boyce, Booboo Stewart, China Anne McClain, Thomas Doherty and Dylan Playfair	Kenny Ortega	
"My Once Upon a Time"	2019	Dove Cameron	Kenny Ortega	
"Queen of Mean"	2019	Sarah Jeffery	Kenny Ortega	
"Queen of Mean (CLOUDxCITY Remix)"	2019	Sarah Jeffery	Tore Livia and Gus Dominguez	
"Audrey's Christmas Rewind"	2019	Sarah Jeffery and Jadah Marie	Unknown	
"Feeling the Love"	2021	Cast of Descendants: The Royal Wedding	Salvador Simó	
"What's My Name (Red Version)"	2024	China Anne McClain and Kylie Cantrall	Jennifer Phang	
"Red"	2024	Kylie Cantrall and Alex Boniello	Jennifer Phang	
"Get Your Hands Dirty"	2024	Malia Baker and Morgan Dudley	Jennifer Phang	
"Love Ain't It"	2024	Rita Ora, Kylie Cantrall, Brandy and Malia Baker	Jennifer Phang	
"Fight of Our Lives"	2024	Kylie Cantrall and Malia Baker	Jennifer Phang	
"Life Is Sweeter"	2024	Descendants – Cast	Jennifer Phang	
"So This Is Love"	2024	Brandy and Paolo Montalban	Jennifer Phang	
"Perfect Revenge"	2024	Dara Reneé, Anthony Pyatt, Joshua Colley, Mars and Peder Lindell	Jennifer Phang	

== Television series ==
=== Descendants: School of Secrets (2015) ===
Before Descendants' premiere air date, Disney Channel announced a live action mini series leading up to the event. It serves as a prequel story for the first Descendants movie. Every day leading up to the release of the film, a new episode of Descendants: School of Secrets would be released revealing more secrets about the students at Auradon Prep. Each episode of the series is under 5 minutes long, with 23 episodes in total.

=== Descendants: Wicked World (2015–2017) ===
Right after the film finished airing on Disney Channel, it was announced that an animated short spinoff entitled Descendants: Wicked World would be released on September 18, 2015. Furthermore, former Liv and Maddie storyboard artist Aliki Theofilopoulos Grafft announced on Twitter that she was directing the series, with Jenni Cook as producer, and that the original cast would be reprising their roles. The animated short-form series has reached over 30 million viewers in the U.S. and generated over 100 million consumer engagements across the Disney Channel app, VOD, and YouTube.

=== The Planning of the Royal Wedding (2020) ===
On November 6, 2020, an animated short prequel of the Descendants: The Royal Wedding television special was released on Disney Channel's YouTube channel. The series follows Mal and Evie as they prepare for the royal wedding with Dove Cameron and Sofia Carson reprising their roles.

=== Chibi Tiny Tales (2024) ===
In July 2024, the first Descendants films were featured in the Chibi Tiny Tales short series on Disney Channel's YouTube channel.

=== Locker Diaries: Descendants (2026) ===
On July 25, 2026 Locker Diaries: Descendants was released, a series of shorts featuring the characters from Descendants: Wicked Wonderland in Auradon Prep in scenes shown through their lockers.

== Short films ==
=== Under the Sea: A Descendants Short Story (2018) ===
A short film, Under The Sea: A Descendants Short Story was released on September 28, 2018. The story revolves around Mal (Dove Cameron), who discovers a glowing orb in a forest. She then meets Dizzy (Anna Cathcart), who is wearing a necklace that is possessed by Uma (China Anne McClain).

=== Audrey's Royal Return: A Descendants Short Story (2019) ===
A second short film, Audrey's Royal Return: A Descendants Short Story, was released on July 5, 2019. It centers on Audrey (Sarah Jeffery), who stops by her salon for a makeover in preparation for her comeback at Auradon after her absence the previous year, summarising the events of the first two films from her point of view while also explaining her absence in the second film.

=== Wicked Woods: A Descendants Halloween Story (2019) ===
A stop motion animation short film, Wicked Woods: A Descendants Halloween Story, was released on October 4, 2019. The story revolves around Mal (Dove Cameron) who tells her friends on Halloween night, about the legend of the Headless Horseman, one of Auradon's first villains, who is said to be lost in the woods of the city and has haunted them for hundreds of years. The short was animated using dolls from the Descendants 3 Hasbro toy line with Dove Cameron, Sofia Carson, Booboo Stewart, Cameron Boyce, Sarah Jeffery and China Anne McClain reprising their roles.

=== Wickedly Sweet: A Descendants Short Story (2024) ===
A stop motion animation short film, Wickedly Sweet: A Descendants Short Story, was released on October 25, 2024 on Disney Channel's YouTube page and October 26, 2024 on Disney Channel. It centers around Red, Chloe, and Bridget getting their hands on the Sorcerer's Cookbook, but Uliana shows up and together, the four sing, dance, and cook some "wickedly sweet" treats. They sing new renditions of "Ways to Be Wicked" from Descendants 2 and "Life Is Sweeter" from Descendants: The Rise of Red. The short was animated using dolls from the Descendants: The Rise of Red Mattel toy line with Kylie Cantrall, Malia Baker, Ruby Rose Turner, and Dara Reneé reprising their characters in voice roles.

=== Shuffle of Love: A Descendants Short Story (2025) ===
A short film, Shuffle of Love: A Descendants Short Story, was released on February 13, 2025 on Disney+ and Disney Channel. The short features Ruby Rose Turner, Kylie Cantrall and Malia Baker reprising their roles from The Rise of Red. In the short, Bridget dreams that her song "Shuffle of Love" is a hit and everyone is dancing to it.

== Television specials ==
=== Descendants Remix Dance Party (2020) ===
Descendants Remix Dance Party is a television special released on March 20, 2020 on Disney Channel, featuring Cheyenne Jackson returning in the role of Hades from Descendants 3, who hosts a dance party with reimagined musical hits from the Descendants films, performed by Sofia Wylie, Dara Reneé, and Kylie Cantrall.

=== Descendants: The Royal Wedding (2021) ===
Descendants: The Royal Wedding is an animated special that premiered on Disney Channel on August 13, 2021. In the special, the wedding between Mal and Ben is going to begin to take place (after getting engaged in Descendants 3). However, with the arrival of Hades the place of the ceremony ends up burning. Mal and her friends go in search of Hades, to find out what exactly happened for everything to end in flames. The story ends with a scene that gives way to the story of Descendants: The Rise of Red.

Descendants: The Royal Wedding was the first Descendants project following Boyce's death; Carlos was briefly mentioned in the special, though what happened to his character was unspecified.

Descendants: The Royal Wedding was nominated for Best Original Score - Short Film (Animated) at the 12th Hollywood Music in Media Awards.

== Live performances ==
=== Disney's Descendants: The Musical ===
On February 6, 2020, Music Theatre International released the rights to a stage adaptation of the film series, written for junior performers. The plot mostly follows that of the first film but uses elements from the sequel and music from all three films and Descendants: Wicked World. It features a book and additional lyrics are written Nick Blaemire, additional music by Madeline Smith, and new orchestrations by Matthew Tishler.

=== Worlds Collide Tour (2025-2027) ===
At the Disney Entertainment Showcase on August 9, 2024, held during the D23 Expo, Disney Branded Television, Disney Concerts, Disney Music Group, and AEG announced the Descendants/Zombies: Worlds Collide Tour, set for summer 2025. The tour brought together stars from both the Descendants and Zombies franchises, with appearances by the Descendants: The Rise of Red and Zombies 4: Dawn of the Vampires stars Kylie Cantrall, Malia Baker, Dara Reneé, Ruby Rose Turner, Freya Skye and Malachi Barton. The tour was an immersive and interactive live concert experience celebrating music from both franchises and was held in arenas across the United States and Canada, running from July 17 to September 16, 2025. The dances were created by Chris Czunys. On June 27, 2025, the cast of the tour released the single "Worlds Collide", with vocals from Kylie Cantrall, Malia Baker, Dara Reneé, Joshua Colley, Malachi Barton, Freya Skye and Mekonnen Knife.

On March 18, 2026, Disney and AEG announced a sequel to the tour that included the return of Descendants and Zombies franchises, as well as the Camp Rock franchise joining the tour with 48 tour dates originally set. 11 additional tour dates were later added for early 2027.The cast includes the return of Malachi Barton, Dara Reneé, and Mekonnen Knife, and former special guest from the previous tour, Liamani was added a full cast member. Other cast members include Zombies 4: Dawn of the Vampires star Swayam Bhatia, Camp Rock 3 star Hudson Stone, and Descendants: Wicked Wonderland stars Kiara Romero and Alexandro Byrd.

== Novels ==
=== The Isle of the Lost series ===
This book series details events that take place before or after the films.

==== The Isle of the Lost (2015) ====
A novel called The Isle of the Lost by Melissa de la Cruz, serving as a prequel to the first Descendants film, has the villains' descendants banding together to retrieve the Dragon's Eye. The book was released on May 5, 2015. The book has spent over 14 weeks as a Children's Middle Grade New York Times Best Seller.

==== Return to the Isle of the Lost (2016) ====
Another Descendants novel titled Return to the Isle of the Lost was released on May 24, 2016, serving as a sequel to the events of the first film, as well as to the first season of the television series Descendants: Wicked World. While Ben is running Auradon while his parents are on a cruise, Mal, Jay, Carlos, and Evie receive threatening messages to return to the Isle of the Lost at the time when it ends up in worse shape ever since Maleficent's defeat and the fact that Cruella de Vil, the Evil Queen and Jafar have gone missing.

==== Rise of the Isle of the Lost (2017) ====
A novel called Rise of the Isle of the Lost was released on May 23, 2017, serving as a prequel to the events of Descendants 2. The novel details Uma's rise to power and her earlier history with Mal. The main plot details Uma planning to get the migrating trident of King Triton in order to help bring down the barrier surrounding the Isle of the Lost.

==== Escape from the Isle of the Lost (2019) ====
The fourth book in the series was published on June 4, 2019, serving as a prequel to the events of Descendants 3.

==== Beyond the Isle of the Lost: Wonderland (2024) ====
The fifth book in the series was published on May 7, 2024, serving as a prequel to the events of Descendants: The Rise of Red.

=== School of Secrets ===
School of Secrets is a series of novels that serve as a continuation of the first Descendants film, as well as the Descendants: Wicked World series. The first book, CJ's Treasure Chase, was released on August 30, 2016 and centers on Captain Hook's daughter, CJ Hook. The second book, Freddie's Shadow Cards, was released on November 1, 2016, and centers on Freddie, the daughter of Dr. Facilier. The third book, Ally's Mad Mystery, was released on February 28, 2017 and focuses on Ally, the daughter of Alice in Wonderland. The fourth novel, Lonnie's Warrior Sword, was released on August 25, 2017, and will focus on Lonnie, the daughter of Mulan and Li Shang, while the fifth book, Carlos's Scavenger Hunt, was released on November 14, 2017.

=== Junior novelization ===
A junior novelization of the film Descendants, adapted by Rico Green, was published on July 14, 2015, a junior novelization of the film Descendants 2 was published in 2017, and a junior novel of Descendants 3 was published on July 30, 2019.

=== Other books ===
Other books have been released, including Mal's Diary, Mal's Spell Book 1 and 2, Evie's Fashion Book, Uma's Wicked Book, Audrey's Diary, The Villain Kids’ Guide for New VKs, The Magic of Friendship, a poster book, a Descendants 3 sticker and activity book, and a Guide to Auradon Prep. All of which were published under Disney Publishing Worldwide.

In May 12, 2026 was published Welcome to Merlin Academy: A Descendants Mystery, written by the author of the Isle of the Lost series Melissa de la Cruz. The story focus on the students at Merlin Academy seen in events of the past in Descendants: The Rise of Red, serving as a prequel to said events.

== Video games ==
In July 2015, Disney Karaoke: Descendants was released on mobile, allowing to sing along to Descendants' songs and record music videos. In November 2015, a mobile game based on the first Descendants film was released, where players can create their avatar and on an adventure through Auradon Prep.

Disney's online game Club Penguin hosted a special Descendants event from September 16 to September 30, 2015. Content based on Descendants 2 was included in the sequel Club Penguin Island.
