= Perfect Princess =

Song by Kylie Cantrall and Malia Baker

from the album Descendants: Wicked Wonderland
- Released: June 11, 2026
- Genre: Pop-rock
- Length: 3:43
- Label: Walt Disney
- Songwriters: Michelle Zarlenga; Chantry Johnson; Mitch Allan
- Producers: Chantry Johnson; Mitch Allan

Descendants singles chronology
"Red Christmas" (2024)	"Perfect Princess" (2026)	"Mad" (2026)

"Perfect Princess" is a song performed by Kylie Cantrall and Malia Baker, and the first single from Descendants: Wicked Wonderland and its soundtrack. Other side performers in the song include Rita Ora, Liamani Segura, Brandy Norwood, Alexandro Byrd, Joel Oulette, Brendon Tremblay, Kiara Romero, Zavien Garrett, Ryan McEwen, and Dayton Paradis. The song was released on June 11, 2026, by Walt Disney Records.

== Music video ==
The music video was released on Disney Music's Vevo channel on June 11, 2026.

== Commercial performance ==
On Billboard’s Top Movie Songs chart, "Perfect Princess" ranked No. 9 through July 2026. On the UK Official Video Streaming Chart, the music video for "Perfect Princess" reached No. 71.

== Live performances ==
On April 20, 2026, the debut performance of "Perfect Princess" was showcased on American Idol, performed by the Descendants: Wicked Wonderland cast members Malia Baker, Liamani, Alexandro Byrd, Kiara Romero and Brendon Tremblay.
