= Descendants: Wicked Wonderland =

2026 film by Kimmy Gatewood

- Official release poster
- Genre: Musical; Fantasy comedy
- Screenplay by: Tamara Chestna; Dan Frey; Ru Sommer
- Directed by: Kimmy Gatewood
- Starring: Kylie Cantrall; Malia Baker; Liamani Segura; Brendon Tremblay; Alexandro Byrd; Kiara Romero; Leonardo Nam; Melanie Paxson; Paolo Montalban; Joel Oulette; Zavien Garrett; Ryan McEwen; Dayton Paradis; Awkwafina; Rita Ora; Brandy
- Composer: Torin Borrowdale
- Country of origin: United States
- Original language: English

Production
- Executive producers: Suzanne Todd; Gary Marsh
- Producer: Mandy Spencer-Phillips
- Production location: Canada
- Cinematography: Christopher Baffa
- Editor: Katie Ennis
- Running time: 95 minutes
- Production companies: Suzanne Todd Productions; Potato Monkey Productions; Bearclaw Productions; Disney Kids & Family

Original release
- Network: Disney Channel
- Release: July 16, 2026
- Network: Disney+
- Release: July 17, 2026

Descendants: Wicked Wonderland is a 2026 American musical teen fantasy comedy film directed by Kimmy Gatewood from a screenplay by Tamara Chestna, Dan Frey, and Ru Sommer. Produced by Disney Channel, the film serves as a sequel to Descendants: The Rise of Red (2024) and is the fifth installment in the Descendants film series.

Kylie Cantrall and Malia Baker reprise their roles as Red, the daughter of the Queen of Hearts from Alice in Wonderland, and Chloe Charming, the daughter of Cinderella and King Charming from Cinderella, respectively.

The film premiered on Disney Channel on July 16, 2026, followed by its release on Disney+ on July 17, 2026. It received mixed-to-positive reviews from critics.

== Plot ==
Shortly after returning from their adventure into the past, Red and Chloe hide Maddox Hatter's magic pocket watch in Wonderland's hidden royal vault. The next day, they begin to learn how their lives have changed as a result of their time-travel. Although Bridget, the Queen of Hearts, has been transformed into a kinder ruler, and Cinderella is now safe, the consequences of altering the timeline soon become apparent: Red now has a younger sister named Pink, while Maddox's son Max, who Red had originally grown up with in Wonderland, is now a VK. Meanwhile, Chloe has trouble reconciling the younger version of Cinderella that she met in the past with the older Cinderella in the present, due to their differing views on life.

It is revealed that a young Maddox witnessed Red and Chloe using the watch to return to the present, and became obsessed with finding the watch. This led Maddox down a dark path and ultimately forced Bridget to banish him and Max to the Isle of the Lost, where he succumbed to madness and became a villain. Maddox was allowed back into Wonderland after the Isle's barrier was removed, but he is still searching for the watch with the help of the Cheshire Cat's daughter Chessy, and intends to exact revenge on Bridget for imprisoning him. After discovering that the watch is now in Wonderland's vault, he captures Bridget, who manages to send a magic distress signal to Red. Maddox uses Bridget's magical cards to seize control of Wonderland, and begins searching for the vault.

After receiving Bridget's warning, Red and Chloe return to Wonderland to rescue her. They are accompanied by Pink, Max, Luisa Madrigal's son Luis, Robin Hood's son Robbie, Captain Hook's daughter Hazel, Dr. Facilier's son Felix, and Mr. Smee's twin sons Squeaky and Squirmy. Maddox detects the group's arrival and forces them to fight through several magical challenges, including an attack by corrupted magic flamingoes and an enchanted chess game. During the latter challenge, Red inadvertently uses Chloe as bait for a carnivorous flower in order to win the game, leaving Chloe deeply hurt and damaging their friendship. Chessy also manipulates several members of the group into arguing with each other. Red bonds with Luis, but her relationships with both Chloe and Pink become strained. Meanwhile, Cinderella learns of the teens' departure, so she uses a magic mirror from Bridget to sneak into the Wonderland palace in an attempt to rescue her, but Maddox captures Cinderella as well.

Max, wanting to prove that he is not like his father, leaves the group to try and steal Maddox's Oraculum, a device that they can use to bargain for Bridget's release. Chessy, however, uses the Oraculum to show Max the truth about how Red and Chloe changed the timeline, robbing the Hatters of their original lives, in which Maddox never turned evil and had a loving relationship with Max. Devastated, Max vows to exact revenge on Red, and creates a magic bracelet; he convinces an angry and hurt Chloe to put on the bracelet, which turns her evil. Max and Chloe enter the magic hedge maze around the vault, pursued by Red and Luis. After she is separated from Luis by the hedges, a remorseful Red finds a "treasure box" that, in the new timeline, she and Pink had placed in the maze as children, and acquires her new memories of growing up with Pink. When Pink finds Red, the pair reconcile, and Red accepts Pink as her sister.

With Pink's help, Red catches up to Chloe and Max as they reach the vault. Max explains that he knows about Red's actions in the past, and plans to use the watch to change history again and prevent Maddox from turning evil. Chloe steals the watch for herself, but Red talks her down; Chloe removes the bracelet, returning her to normal, and they reconcile. The two convince Max that trying to change the past again would be too dangerous, considering the damage that they accidentally caused on their first attempt. Max reluctantly accepts this, and Red throws the watch into a magic well where it disappears. The group then reach the castle and capture Maddox with help from Bridget and Cinderella. Red convinces Bridget not to punish Maddox and apologizes to him, admitting that she was to blame for changing his life.

With Wonderland saved, the heroes all celebrate together, and Red, Chloe, Pink, and their new friends look forward to the future. In the final scene, Pink finds a strange glowing object that she hides in her and Red's "treasure box", and Chessy warns the audience that the story is not over.

== Cast ==
- Kylie Cantrall as Red, the daughter of the Queen of Hearts
  - Emilia Gomez as young Red
- Malia Baker as Chloe Charming, the daughter of Cinderella and King Charming
- Liamani Segura as Pink, the daughter of the Queen of Hearts and younger sister of Red
  - Brielle Celis as young Pink
- Leonardo Nam as Maddox Hatter, the son of the Mad Hatter
- Brendon Tremblay as Max Hatter, the son of Maddox Hatter and grandson of the Mad Hatter
  - Avery Onyx Hargrave as young Max
- Alexandro Byrd as Luis Madrigal, the son of Luisa Madrigal
- Kiara Romero as Hazel Hook, the daughter of Captain Hook
- Joel Oulette as Robbie Hood, the son of Robin Hood
- Zavien Garrett as Felix Facilier, the son of Dr. Facilier
- Ryan McEwen as Squirmy Smee, the younger twin brother of Squeaky and son of Mr. Smee
- Dayton Paradis as Squeaky Smee, the older twin brother of Squirmy and son of Mr. Smee
- Rita Ora as Bridget, the Queen of Hearts, ruler of Wonderland, and mother of Red and Pink
- Brandy as Cinderella, Chloe's mother
- Paolo Montalban as King Charming, Chloe's father
- Melanie Paxson as the Fairy Godmother
- Awkwafina as the voice of Chessy Cheshire, the daughter of the Cheshire Cat who is Maddox' companion. She also serves as the narrator of the film.

Additionally, Ruby Rose Turner and Morgan Dudley appear briefly in archive footage as Bridget (the young Queen of Hearts) and Ella (the young Cinderella) respectively, in a flashback.

== Production ==
After the release of Descendants: The Rise of Red, Suzanne Todd confirmed that Disney is "definitely working on and thinking about a follow-up movie," saying that after the end of The Rise of Red and the consequences of time travel, in the sequel "there will be future good and evil turns for sure." After the 2024 Emmy Awards, Cantrall and Baker also hinted that additional films may come in the future.

=== Filming ===
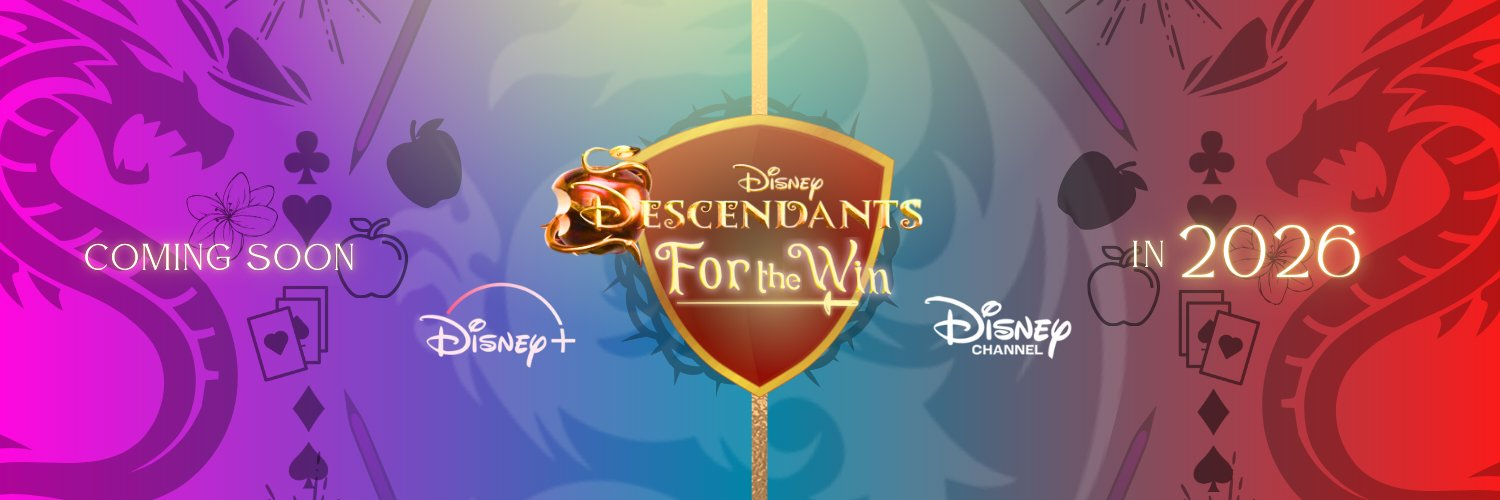
Descendants/Zombies: Worlds Collide Tour announcement.

A fifth film in the Descendants franchise was officially greenlit in February 2025, Principal photography began at The Bridge Studios in Vancouver in early April 2025, British Columbia's provincial film commission, Creative BC, listed the production as active in the province in an in-production report issued in late April 2025. Coverage of the shoot at the time noted the scale of the ensemble cast assembling on location, with Cantrall and Baker heading a group that mixed returning performers with the newly cast young cast members. Filming wrapped by the end of May 2025, with outlets publishing a first look at both the returning and new cast to mark the occasion. Production also reportedly concluded in time for cast members to take part in the Descendants/Zombies: Worlds Collide Tour later that summer.

=== Casting ===
Kylie Cantrall, Malia Baker, and Leonardo Nam were confirmed to return as Red, Chloe Charming, and Maddox Hatter when the project was greenlit, alongside new cast members, Liamani Segura as Pink, Brendon Tremblay as Max Hatter, Alexandro Byrd as Luis Madrigal, and Kiara Romero as Hazel Hook. The following month, four more actors joined the production as the offspring of Robin Hood, Dr. Facilier, and Mr. Smee: Joel Oulette as Robbie Hood, Zavien Garrett as Felix Facilier, and Ryan McEwen and Dayton Paradis as the Smee twins, Squirmy and Squeaky respectively, who were previously played by Christian Convery and Luke Roessler in Descendants 3. In May 2025, Rita Ora, Brandy, and Melanie Paxson were confirmed to reprise their adult roles as the Queen of Hearts, Cinderella, and the Fairy Godmother. Nearly a year later, in March 2026, Awkwafina was announced as the voice of Chessy the Cat, a wholly new character created for the film. Cast photos released around the start of production offered the first public look at the returning and newly assembled ensemble together.

== Music ==
The first single from the film's soundtrack, "Perfect Princess" by Kylie Cantrall and Malia Baker, was released on June 12, 2026. Another song, "Mad - Wicked Wonderland", was released on June 26, 2026 as an audio-only post on the Disney Music channel on YouTube. The third single, "Dancing With The Enemy", was released on July 10, 2026.

On the Billboard Kid Albums chart, Descendants: Wicked Wonderland debuted at No. 1, becoming the fifth album from the Descendants franchise to top the chart. The album debuted at No. 2 on the Soundtracks chart and at No. 88 on the Billboard 200.

== Release ==
Descendants: Wicked Wonderland was released on Disney Channel on July 16, 2026, and streamed on Disney+ the following day.

== Reception ==
=== Critical response ===
Hrvoje Milakovic of Comic basics described the film as a franchise finding new footing, praising director Kimmy Gatewood's sharper visual sense and a rock-and-roll redesign of Wonderland built around neon costuming and tilted geometry, arguing the change in setting gave the sequel a distinct identity rather than recycling the look of Auradon from earlier films. A review by Steve Seigh of JoBlo likewise found the film an improvement over its predecessor across writing, music, and choreography, though it noted the recurring conflict between the young heroes and villains grew wearisome given how easily a candid conversation could have resolved it.

A review at Popped called the film's central antagonist underdeveloped and argued it was weighed down by an overstuffed cast, a distant villain, underused returning characters, and a story that felt both busy and dull, while still crediting the lead performance and soundtrack as bright spots. A review at RIOTUS raised a similar concern about the size of the cast, observing that some characters seemed to be written out of the plot simply for lack of space, leaving figures such as Robbie Hood and Felix Facilier feeling more decorative than developed, the same review also noted the absence of any dark-skinned characters in the principal cast, a point it found conspicuous given Brandy's presence as one of the few performers of color. A review at Mama's Geeky was more measured, praising the newer characters, particularly Luisa Madrigal's son Luis and Hazel Hook, along with Awkwafina's performance as Chessy, while concluding the film was an improvement on The Rise of Red without matching the original trilogy.

Common Sense Media's parents' guide flagged several scenes of peril, including characters taking falls, narrowly avoiding falling objects, becoming lost, being trapped in a teacup amid rough seas, and being held captive, alongside milder content such as teenage flirting and hand-holding.

=== Ratings ===
Descendants: Wicked Wonderland was watched by 7.5 million viewers in the first three days of streaming on Disney+. It become Disney Branded Television's highest original movie premiere on the streaming service, surpassing its predecessor. Streaming analytics firm FlixPatrol, which monitors daily updated VOD charts and streaming ratings across the globe, reported that Descendants: Wicked Wonderland ranked first among films on Disney+ worldwide as of July 19, ahead of Avatar: Fire and Ash, which ranked second. The film ranked first on Disney+ in 71 countries, including the United States, the United Kingdom, and Canada. Nielsen Media Research, which records streaming viewership on certain U.S. television screens, announced that the film recorded 359 million minutes of watch time from July 13–20, ranking as the fourth most-streamed film of the week. During the following week, from July 20–26, it generated a further 289 million minutes of watch time, ranking eighth.

=== Accolades ===
Award	Date of ceremony	Category	Recipient(s)	Result	Ref.
Nickelodeon Kids' Choice Awards	November 14, 2026	Watch Party: Kids' Choice	Descendants: Wicked Wonderland	Nominated	
Hollywood Music in Media Awards	November 18, 2026	Song – Onscreen Performance (TV Show/Limited Series)	"Perfect Princess"– Performed by Kylie Cantrall, Malia Baker, and Descendants: Wicked Wonderland Cast	Nominated	
Hollywood Music in Media Awards	November 18, 2026	Music Themed Film, Biopic or Musical	Kimmy Gatewood	Nominated	

== In other media ==
=== Television series ===
The film was followed by the television series Locker Diaries: Descendants, released a week later on July 25, 2026, where the characters of the film are shown in Auradon Prep in scenes shown through their lockers. While the first two episodes serve as a prequel to the events of the film, the rest take place afterwards.
