= Malia Baker =

Botswana and Canadian actress (born 2006)

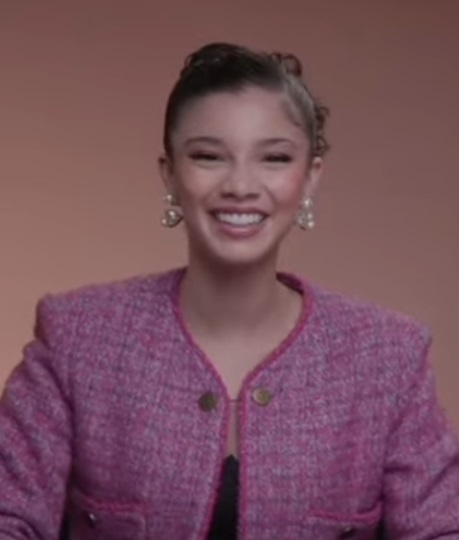
- Baker in 2024
- Born: Malia Simphiwe Baker; December 18, 2006 (age 19); Gaborone, Botswana
- Occupations: Actress; singer; activist
- Years active: 2018–present

Malia Simphiwe Baker (born December 18, 2006) is a Botswana and Canadian actress and singer. She rose to prominence with her leading role in the Netflix comedy-drama series The Baby-Sitters Club (2020–2021), which earned her a Children's and Family Emmy Award nomination for Outstanding Younger Performer. Baker also appeared in the revival of the Nickelodeon anthology series Are You Afraid of the Dark? (2021) and portrays Chloe Charming in the Disney Channel franchise Descendants (2024–present).

== Early life ==
Malia Simphiwe Baker was born on December 18, 2006, in Gaborone, Botswana, to a Motswana father and a Jewish-Canadian mother. The family moved to Vancouver, British Columbia when she was over two years old, where she was raised with her younger sister, Ivory.

== Career ==
=== 2018–2019: Career beginnings ===
Baker made her acting debut in an uncredited role in the Hallmark Channel television film Hope at Christmas (2018); she was an extra for an actress who had a pink eye. Her first credited role was a guest appearance in the first season of the ABC family drama series A Million Little Things (2019). She also had a small role in the fifth season of The CW superhero series The Flash (2019), and an uncredited appearance in the first season of the CBS anthology series The Twilight Zone (2019).

=== 2020–present: Breakthrough roles ===
Baker was cast in the Netflix comedy-drama series The Baby-Sitters Club in March 2020. Her performance as Mary Anne Spier, the club's shy secretary, received widespread critical acclaim. She returned to her leading role in the second season of the series in 2021, before it was cancelled one year later. She was also featured in the second season of the second revival of Are You Afraid of the Dark?, a horror anthology series for Nickelodeon.

In February 2022, Baker starred as a cyberbullying victim in the Lifetime thriller television film Caught in His Web, and defended Catherine Hernandez's novel Scarborough in that year's edition of Canada Reads. For her work on The Baby-Sitter Club, she was nominated for the Children's and Family Emmy Award for Outstanding Younger Performer during its inaugural ceremony. In 2024, Baker starred as Chloe Charming, the daughter of Cinderella and Prince Charming from Cinderella, in the Disney Channel musical fantasy film Descendants: The Rise of Red. She had a minor role in the drama film What We Hide the following year. In 2026, Baker starred in and executive produced the indie drama film Hair of the Bear, and reprised her role as Charming in Descendants: Wicked Wonderland.

==== Upcoming projects ====
Baker will star in the dramedy Harvest Moon, and the drama film Thena.

== Filmography ==
=== Film ===
Key
†	Denotes films that have not yet been released

Year	Title	Role	Notes	Ref(s)
2018	Hope at Christmas	Malia Weir	Uncredited role	
2022	Caught in His Web	Olivia		
2024	Descendants: The Rise of Red	Chloe Charming		
2024	Wickedly Sweet: A Descendants Short Story	Chloe Charming	Short film; Voice role	
2025	Shuffle of Love: A Descendants Short Story	Chloe Charming	Short film	
2025	What We Hide	Alexis		
2025	12 Hours	Jasmine	Short film	
2026	Hair of the Bear	Tori	Also executive producer	
2026	Descendants: Wicked Wonderland	Chloe Charming		
TBA	Harvest Moon †	Bella	Post-production	
TBA	Thena †	Lotus	Post-production	

=== Television ===
Year	Title	Role	Notes	Ref.
2019	A Million Little Things	Young Regina	Cameo role (S1E14)	
2019	The Flash	Alice Bolen	Cameo role (S5E17)	
2019	The Twilight Zone	Young Anna	Uncredited role (S1E10)	
2020–2021	The Baby-Sitters Club	Mary Anne Spier	Main role	
2021	Are You Afraid of the Dark?	Gabby Lewis	Main role	
2026	Disney Parks Christmas Day Parade †	Herself	Host alongside Robert Irwin	

=== Video games ===
Year	Title	Role	Notes	Ref(s)
2023	Avatar: Frontiers of Pandora	Woai	Voice	
2023	Avatar: Frontiers of Pandora	Ahari	Voice	

== Discography ==
=== Albums ===
==== Soundtrack albums ====
Title	Album details
Descendants: The Rise of Red	Released: July 12, 2024; Label: Walt Disney Records; Format: CD, Digital download
Descendants: Wicked Wonderland	Released: July 17, 2026; Label: Walt Disney Records; Format: CD, Digital download

=== Other charted songs ===
Title	Year	Album
"Love Ain't It"	2024	Descendants: The Rise of Red
"Fight of Our Lives"	2024	Descendants: The Rise of Red
"Life Is Sweeter"	2024	Descendants: The Rise of Red
"Get Your Hands Dirty"	2024	Descendants: The Rise of Red
"Life Is Sweeter (Remix)"	2024	Descendants: The Rise of Red
"Perfect Princess"	2026	Descendants: Wicked Wonderland
"Did You Hear About Them"	2026	Descendants: Wicked Wonderland
"Dancing With The Enemy"	2026	Descendants: Wicked Wonderland
"Heartless"	2026	Descendants: Wicked Wonderland
"Go Live It"	2026	Descendants: Wicked Wonderland

== Awards and nominations ==
Award	Year	Category	Work	Result	Ref.
Children's and Family Emmy Awards	2022	Outstanding Younger Performer	The Baby-Sitters Club	Nominated	
Kids' Choice Awards	2022	Favorite Female TV Star (Kids)	The Baby-Sitters Club / Are You Afraid of the Dark?	Nominated	
Leo Awards	2022	Youth Performance	The Baby-Sitters Club	Nominated	
Leo Awards	2026	Best Lead Performance	Hair of the Bear	Nominated	
