= Gary Marsh =

American executive in media and production

- Education: University of California, Los Angeles
- Occupation: Media executive
- Years active: 33
- Employer: The Walt Disney Company
- Known for: Executive of Disney Branded Television
- Title: President and Chief Creative Officer of Disney Branded Television
- Website: TheWaltDisneyCompany.com

Gary Marsh is a media executive who was President and Chief Creative Officer for Disney Branded Television, where he developed and produced Disney Channel Original Series, Disney Channel Original Movies, and Disney Junior Series (formerly Playhouse Disney). He also oversaw talent and casting operations for Disney Channel.

== Career ==
Marsh joined Disney Channel in July 1988 as executive director of Original Programming. He was made Vice President eight months later, and in 1994, became Senior Vice President.

In 1999, he was promoted to Executive Vice President, and in 2001, Marsh assumed the role of Executive Vice President of Original Programming and Production at Disney Channel.

In 2005, he was promoted to President of Entertainment at Disney Channels Worldwide, and in 2009, he assumed the role of Chief Creative Officer at Disney Channels Worldwide before being promoted to President and Chief Creative Office at Disney Channels Worldwide in 2011.

In 2021, Marsh made an overall deal with Disney. At the end of 2021, Marsh left his role as President and Chief Creative Officer of Disney Branded TV but did not leave Disney entirely. Marsh as a longtime executive at Disney who helped develop major franchises like High School Musical, Descendants, and Hannah Montana, stepped down as president and chief creative officer of Disney Branded Television in 2021. He will launched his own production company under a multiyear deal with Disney to develop content for Disney+, ABC, Disney Channel, and National Geographic.

Backed by Disney General Entertainment, Marsh founded production company Potato Monkey Productions and created content for Disney’s online streaming platforms, including Disney+, Hulu, Disney Channel, Freeform, and FX.

== Filmography ==
Year	Title	Executive Producer	Notes
2024	Zombies: The Re-Animated Series	Yes	
2024	Descendants: The Rise of Red	Yes	Potato Monkey Productions; Disney Original Movie
2024–2026	Wizards Beyond Waverly Place	Yes	Potato Monkey Productions
2026	Descendants: Wicked Wonderland	Yes	Potato Monkey Productions; Disney Channel Original Movie
2026	Camp Rock 3	Yes	Potato Monkey Productions; Disney Channel Original Movie
2027	Hidden Heroes: A Descendants Story	Yes	
