= List of Disney's Cinderella characters =

Cinderella fits the glass slipper. From left to right: Jaq, Gus, Suzy, Perla, the Grand Duke, Drizella, Anastasia, Lady Tremaine and Cinderella.

Disney's Cinderella is an animated feature film based on the fairy tale of the same name, released in 1950, which received two direct-to-video sequels: Cinderella II: Dreams Come True (2002) and Cinderella III: A Twist in Time (2007). The main characters introduced in the first film include the protagonist Cinderella, her mouse friends Jaq and Gus, her stepmother Lady Tremaine and stepsisters Anastasia and Drizella, her Fairy Godmother, and her love interest, Prince Charming. Dreams Come True and the 2015 live-action remake introduced new characters while expanding on the story.

== Main characters ==
=== Cinderella ===
Cinderella (voiced by Ilene Woods in the original film and Jennifer Hale in the sequels) is a young orphan who, after the death of her father, is forced into servitude under her evil stepmother, Lady Tremaine, and stepsisters, Anastasia and Drizella. Despite this, she maintains hope through her dreams, believing that one day her dreams of happiness will come true and her kindness will be repaid. Though kind and down-to-earth, she is also a daydreamer.

With the help of her animal friends, she repairs her mother's old dress so that she can attend a royal ball, but is heartbroken when her stepsisters tear it up and fears that her dreams will never come true. However, her Fairy Godmother appears and uses her magic to transform the dress into a gown, as well as a pumpkin into a carriage, Jaq, Gus, and the mice into horses, her horse Major into a coachman, and her bloodhound Bruno into a footman. However, she warns her that the magic will end at midnight. At the ball, she dances with Prince Charming, with whom she falls in love, before leaving at midnight and leaving behind one of her slippers. Although he does not know her name, he identifies her by the slipper, which fits her, and they marry soon after.

In the live-action remake, she is portrayed by Eloise Webb as a 10-year-old in the prologue and Lily James in the present. She was originally named Ella, with Cinderella being a spiteful nickname the stepsisters gave to her after she slept near the fireplace and was covered by cinder (ash).

In the live-action Descendants film series, Cinderella has a son named Chad, who appears in the first three films, and a daughter named Chloe, who appears in the fourth film. Cinderella also appears in the fourth film, Descendants: The Rise of Red, portrayed by Brandy Norwood, who previously portrayed Cinderella in the 1997 television film Cinderella, while Morgan Dudley portrays the character as a teenager, with her real name being Ella.

=== Jaq and Gus ===
Jaq
- First appearance: Cinderella (1950)
- Created by: Ward Kimball; John Lounsbery
- Based on: Bud Abbott
- Voiced by: Jimmy MacDonald (1950–1989); Rob Paulsen (2001–present)
- Alias: Jaq-Jaq
- Species: Mouse
- Significant other: Mary

Gus
- First appearance: Cinderella (1950)
- Created by: Ward Kimball; John Lounsbery
- Based on: Lou Costello
- Voiced by: Jimmy MacDonald (1950–1989); Corey Burton (2001–present)
- Alias: Gus-Gus
- Species: Mouse

Jaq and Gus (voiced by Jimmy MacDonald in the original film, Rob Paulsen and Corey Burton in the sequels) are two mice who serve as Cinderella's sidekicks and closest confidants, with Jaq serving as the mices' leader.

==== In Cinderella films ====
In Cinderella, after Cinderella rescues Gus from a cage, he and Jaq are two of four mice that the Fairy Godmother transforms into stallions so that Cinderella can attend the ball, but return to normal at the stroke of midnight. Later, Jaq and Gus steal the key to Cinderella's room from Lady Tremaine so she can escape. They are last seen attending the wedding of Cinderella and Prince Charming.

In Cinderella II: Dreams Come True, they and the mice move into the castle and Gus comes up with the idea to make the new book of stories to replace the old one. In Aim to Please, Jaq and Gus help Cinderella prepare for the ball and support her when she doubts herself. In Tall Tail, Jaq, feeling useless, wishes that he were a human, which the Fairy Godmother grants. He helps Cinderella and the others prepare for the fair before realizing that he liked being a mouse better and returns to normal. In An Uncommon Romance, he and the mice attempt to help Lucifer win the affections of the snobby female cat Pom-Pom in hopes that the cats will leave the mice alone.

In Cinderella III: A Twist in Time, Gus and Jaq help the Fairy Godmother prepare for Prince Charming and Cinderella's anniversary party. After Lady Tremaine reverses time and makes the slipper fit Anastasia's foot, they help Cinderella search for Charming and witness Tremaine casting a spell on him to make him forget Cinderella and believe that he danced with Anastasia. Though they reclaim the wand from Tremaine, she has Cinderella arrested before she can lift the spell on Charming. Gus and Jaq convince Charming that Cinderella is the right girl through a song, "At the Ball". They later help Cinderella put on her wedding gown, but Tremaine sends them away and assigns Lucifer to drive them in a pumpkin carriage over a cliff. After escaping, Cinderella, Jaq, and Gus return to the palace and they attack the entrance guards to let her through to the wedding. They appear in the closing credits in a series of photos.

==== Other appearances in animation ====
Like other characters from the first film, Jaq and Gus make cameo appearances in the television series House of Mouse as guests of the titular club. In the direct-to-video film Mickey's Magical Christmas: Snowed in at the House of Mouse, they take part in the musical number "The Best Christmas of All", where they give Cinderella a dress for Christmas.

Like other Walt Disney Animation Studios characters, they have a cameo appearance in the short film Once Upon a Studio.

==== In video games ====
Jaq appears in the video game Kingdom Hearts Birth by Sleep, where he befriends Ventus after freeing him from a mousetrap. Ventus later helps him gather the necessary materials for Cinderella's dress; after Tremaine locks Cinderella in her room, Jaq retrieves the key and is saved by Aqua when the Unversed ambush him.

Jaq and Gus also appear as playable characters in the video game Disney Magic Kingdoms.

==== In other media ====
In Once Upon a Time, Billy the mechanic (portrayed by Jarod Joseph) is revealed in the episode "Child of the Moon" to be the mouse Gus. Soon after, he is murdered by D.A. Albert Spencer/King George (Alan Dale).

In the live-action remake, Jaq is a doe named Jacqueline, while Gus is referred to as Gus-Gus.

Jaq and Gus also appear in the Grandma Duck comics in Walt Disney's Comics and Stories, where they live with Grandma Duck and her grandnephew Gus Goose. They also appear in the Mickey Mouse comic strip Mousepotamia.

=== Lady Tremaine ===
Lady Tremaine (voiced by Eleanor Audley in the original film and Susanne Blakeslee in sequels and other media) is the main villainess of the franchise, who is based on the original character from the fairy tale created by Charles Perrault. She is cruel and seeks to ensure her daughters' success. After marrying Cinderella's father for his money, following his death she reveals her true motives of treating Cinderella like a maid while devoting her time and love to her daughters.

In live-action depictions, she was portrayed by Cate Blanchett in the live-action remake, by Linda Ko in Descendants 3, and by Julee Cerda in Descendants: The Rise of Red. Two versions inspired on the character appear in Once Upon a Time: the first is portrayed by Jan Brandle Smith in the first season and by Lisa Banes in the sixth season, and the second version, known as Rapunzel Tremaine, is portrayed by Gabrielle Anwar in the seventh season and Meegan Warner as a young woman.

=== Anastasia Tremaine ===
Anastasia Tremaine
- First appearance: Cinderella (1950)
- Created by: Ollie Johnston; Wetzel Whitaker
- Portrayed by: Holliday Grainger (2015 film); Yael Yurman (Once Upon a Time)
- Voiced by: Lucille Bliss (in Cinderella); Tress MacNeille (1994–present); Lesli Margherita (sequels, singing)

In-universe information
- Alias: Cinderella
- Family: Drizella Tremaine (twin sister); Cinderella's father (step-father, deceased); Cinderella (step-sister); Sir Francis Tremaine (father, deceased; 2015 film); Lady Tremaine (mother)
- Significant others: The Baker (boyfriend); Prince Charming (ex-fiancé)
- Children: Anthony Tremaine (Descendants)
- Relatives: Prince Charming (step-brother-in-law); Dizzy Tremaine (niece; Descendants); Chad Charming (step-nephew; Descendants); Chloe Charming (step-niece; Descendants)

Anastasia Tremaine (voiced by Lucille Bliss) is the younger daughter of Lady Tremaine. Though following the original story's depiction of the ugly and cruel stepsister in the first film, Anastasia undergoes a redemption arc in the sequels as she struggles to find genuine love and follow her conscience despite her mother and sister's negative influence. Pat Williams, James Denney, and Jim Denney reported that actress "Lucille Bliss was the voice of Cinderella's stepsister, Anastasia, an experience that remains one of her fondest memories." Bliss that "I was just a teenager when I got the part...I read that Walt had personally selected me for the part of Anastasia."

==== In Cinderella films ====
In the original film, she and Drizella are cruel to Cinderella and tear up her dress before the Fairy Godmother repairs it.

In Cinderella II: Dreams Come True, Anastasia falls in love with a working-class baker and wants to get close to him, which Tremaine forbids because of her prejudice towards his social standing. However, Cinderella reassures her that the baker is a good man, regardless of what Lady Tremaine believes, and encourages her to follow her heart. With help from Cinderella and her animal friends, they reunite and attend Cinderella's ball together, where she thanks Cinderella for her help.

In Cinderella III: A Twist in Time, she finds the Fairy Godmother's wand, setting into motion Tremaine's plot to destroy Cinderella's "happily ever after" and gain a rich lifestyle at the palace. Though manipulated and forced into marrying Prince Charming as a means to fulfil her family's selfish desires, she begins to feel remorse and guilt. At the altar, after realizing she does not truly love Charming and having understood what true love really means after talking with the King, she refuses to marry him, much to Cinderella's surprise and amazement. Cinderella and Prince Charming protected her from Lady Tremaine and Drizella for her honesty and change of heart, and she sets things right after regaining the wand. Afterwards, she repairs her relationship with Cinderella, who invites her to stay in the castle to be her lady-in-waiting. During the credits, she is shown in a painting sitting in the palace garden while looking at the baker.

Variety stated that "stepsister Anastasia is appreciably more sympathetic" in Cinderella III. At Walt Disney World during the Cinderella's Gala Feast attraction, Julie and Mike Neal stated that "everyone will love Anastasia and Drizella, Cinderella's evil stepsisters, who wander the room with Lady Tremaine..."

==== Other appearances in animation ====
Like other characters from the first film, Anastasia makes cameo appearances in the television series House of Mouse as a guest of the titular club. In the direct-to-video film Mickey's House of Villains, she takes part in the musical number "It's Our House Now" when villains take over the club.

Like other Walt Disney Animation Studios characters, she have a cameo appearance in the short film Once Upon a Studio.

==== In video games ====
Anastasia appears in Kingdom Hearts Birth by Sleep in her homeworld, Castle of Dreams, having the same role as in the original film. However, the darkness in her heart leads her to attempt to murder Cinderella before the Cursed Coach, an Unversed born from their jealousy, drops a bomb on them and transforms them into Heartless.

Anastasia also appears as a playable character in Disney Magic Kingdoms.

==== In other media ====
In the live-action remake, she, along with her mother and sister, leave the kingdom with the Grand Duke.

While Anastasia does not appear in the Descendants franchise, her son, Anthony, appears in the Isle of the Lost book series. She is briefly mentioned by her mother in Descendants: The Rise of Red.

Two versions of the character appear in Once Upon a Time. Clorinda, Cinderella's stepsister who is based on her, appears in the sixth season, portrayed by Mekenna Melvin, while in the seventh season, named Anastasia like in the animated film, she is portrayed by Yael Yurman.

=== Drizella Tremaine ===
Drizella Tremaine
- First appearance: Cinderella (1950)
- Created by: Ollie Johnston; Wetzel Whitaker
- Portrayed by: Sophie McShera (2015 film); Adelaide Kane (Once Upon a Time; adult); Anna Cathcart (Once Upon a Time; tween)
- Voiced by: Rhoda Williams (in Cinderella); Russi Taylor (1986–2020); Kaitlyn Robrock (2020–present)
- Family: Lady Tremaine (mother); Anastasia Tremaine (twin sister); Cinderella's father (step-father); Cinderella (step-sister); Sir Francis Tremaine (father, deceased; 2015 film)
- Children: Dizzy Tremaine (Descendants)
- Relatives: Prince Charming (step-brother-in-law); Anthony Tremaine (nephew; Descendants); Chad Charming (step-nephew; Descendants); Chloe Charming (step-niece; Descendants)

Drizella Tremaine (voiced by Rhoda Williams in the original film and Russi Taylor in the sequels) is the older daughter of Lady Tremaine. Drizella appears in various novels and other publications. She, like Anastasia and Tremaine, is haughty, abusive, and cruel, and envious of Cinderella's success and beauty. Unlike Anastasia, she remains cruel and obedient to Tremaine.

==== In Cinderella films ====
In the original film, she and Anastasia are cruel to Cinderella and tear up her dress before the Fairy Godmother repairs it. In Cinderella II: Dreams Come True, during the story An Uncommon Romance, she is shocked after Anastasia rebels against Tremaine and declares her love for the baker, but still sides with Tremaine.

In Cinderella III: A Twist in Time, she, like Anastasia, was discontented with doing chores that Cinderella used to do. She was at first skeptical of the Fairy Godmother's magic wand, but after Anastasia accidentally turned the Fairy Godmother into a statue, she went along with Lady Tremaine's plan for revenge against Cinderella. She was dismayed and annoyed that the glass slipper fitted Anastasia's foot. She was revealed to have terrible table manners, as shown when she and Anastasia "sample the hors d'oeuvres", resulting in a food fight. After Anastasia's disastrous and incompetent dancing, she suggested that they flee the castle, but she and Lady Tremaine were surprised when the King grew fond of her, as she reminded him of his late wife, the Queen, and he gifted her the Queen's cherished seashell, which left Anastasia feeling guilty about her family's deceit. After Cinderella attempted to undo the spell using the wand, Drizella taunted her in a "Nice try" manner, nearly giving their plot away, at which point, Lady Tremaine threatens to have her banished as well. Later, after Cinderella and the Prince told the King of what really happened, and the King orders the arrest of Lady Tremaine and her daughters, Lady Tremaine made one final attempt for revenge by having Anastasia to pose as Cinderella for the wedding while sending the real Cinderella to her supposed doom. However, after witnessing both the return of the real Cinderella, and Anastasia (who felt guilty that she deceived both the Prince and the King, and betrayed Cinderella) rejecting the Prince at the altar, she, like Lady Tremaine, was furious at Anastasia for her betrayal, and after they emerged from their hiding place, and when Lady Tremaine turned some of the palace guards into farm animals, she told Lady Tremaine to punish both Cinderella and Anastasia by turning them into toads, but the Prince defended the two from the spell and reflected it back with his sword, turning both her and Lady Tremaine into toads instead. During the end credits, she and Lady Tremaine have been restored back to their human forms, but they are horrified to learn that they are holding brooms and wearing scullery clothes identical to those Cinderella used to wear, implying that they have been sentenced to work in the palace as servants as punishment for their crimes and villainous actions.

==== Other appearances in animation ====
Like other characters from the first film, Drizella makes cameo appearances in the television series House of Mouse as a guest of the titular club. In the direct-to-video film Mickey's House of Villains, she takes part in the musical number "It's Our House Now" when villains take over the club.

Like other Walt Disney Animation Studios characters, she have a cameo appearance in the short film Once Upon a Studio.

==== In video games ====
She appears in Kingdom Hearts Birth by Sleep in her homeworld, Castle of Dreams, having the same role as in the original film. However, the darkness in her heart leads her to attempt to murder Cinderella before the Cursed Coach, an Unversed born from their jealousy, drops a bomb on them and transforms them into Heartless.

Drizella also appears as a playable character in the world building game video game Disney Magic Kingdoms.

==== In other media ====
In the live-action remake, where she is portrayed by Sophie McShera, she is known as Drisella. She, along with her mother and sister, later leave the kingdom with the Grand Duke.

While Drizella does not appear in the Descendants franchise, she has a daughter, Dizzy who appears in Descendants 2 and Descendants 3, as well as TV specials and other media. She is briefly mentioned by her mother in Descendants: The Rise of Red.

Two versions of Drizella appear in Once Upon a Time. Tisbe, Cinderella's stepsister who is based on her, appears in the sixth season, portrayed by Goldie Hoffman. Another version of Drizella serves as a secondary antagonist during the seventh season, portrayed by Adelaide Kane. In flashbacks, a tween Drizella is portrayed by Anna Cathcart (coincidentally, Cathcart also played Drizella's daughter, Dizzy, in the Descendants film series).

=== Lucifer ===
Lucifer
- First appearance: Cinderella (1950)
- Created by: Ward Kimball; John Lounsbery; Wolfgang Reitherman; Norm Ferguson
- Voiced by: June Foray (1950); Frank Welker (2002–present); Jon Olson (2010)
- Alias: Rucifie (by the mice)
- Species: Cat
- Gender: Male
- Children: Beelzebub (Descendants)
- Owner: Lady Tremaine

Lucifer (vocal effects provided by June Foray in the original film, Frank Welker in the sequels, and Jon Olson in Kingdom Hearts Birth by Sleep) is the Tremaines' pet cat.

==== In Cinderella films ====
In the first film, he antagonizes the mice and seemingly dies by falling out of the tower's window after being scared away by Bruno. However, the sequels reveal that he survived the fall due to cats always landing on their feet.

In Cinderella II: Dreams Come True, Lucifer appears in the third and final segment, An Uncommon Romance, where he falls in love with the snobby palace cat Pom-Pom and makes a deal with the mice that he will not chase them again if they help him reconcile with Pom-Pom. Though the plan works, Pom-Pom goads Lucifer into breaking his promise and dumps him out of spite.

In Cinderella III: A Twist in Time, Lady Tremaine turns him into a human coachman to take Cinderella and the mice away from the palace. However, he falls off the coach and returns to normal.

==== Other appearances in animation ====
Like other characters from the first film, Lucifer makes cameo appearances in the television series House of Mouse as a guest of the titular club. In the direct-to-video film Mickey's House of Villains, he takes part in the musical number "It's Our House Now" when villains take over the club.

Like other Walt Disney Animation Studios characters, he have a cameo appearance in the short film Once Upon a Studio.

==== In video games ====
Lucifer appears in Kingdom Hearts Birth by Sleep as a boss character who Ventus fights while helping Jaq gather the necessary materials for Cinderella's dress.

He also appears in the video game Disney Magic Kingdoms as a playable character to unlock for a limited time.

=== The Fairy Godmother ===
Fairy Godmother
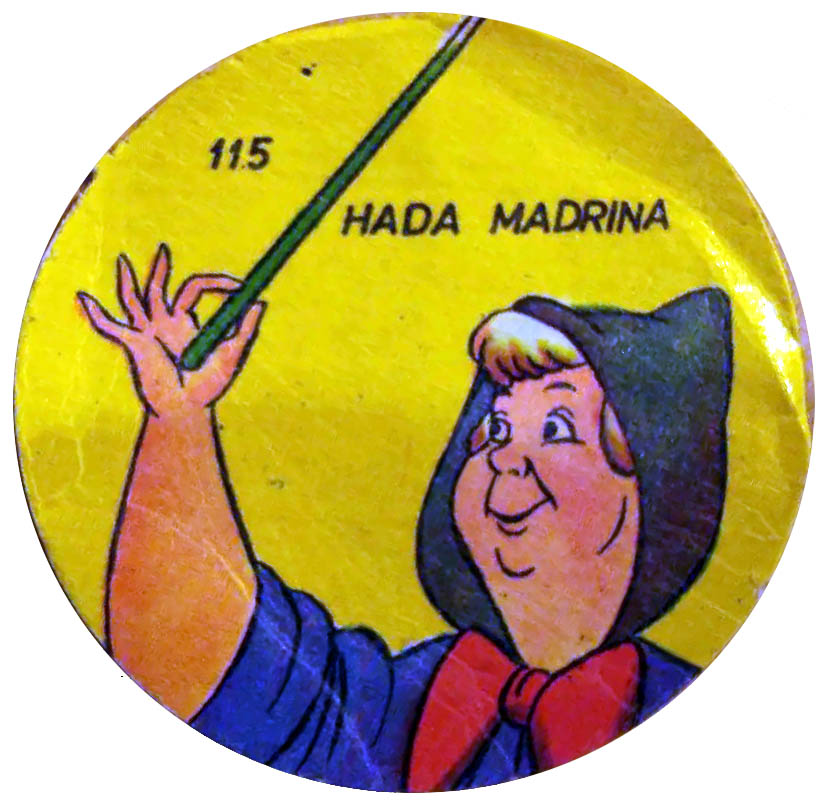
- Fairy Godmother in a 1964 trading card
- First appearance: Cinderella (1950)
- Created by: Milt Kahl
- Portrayed by: Helena Bonham Carter (2015 film); Melanie Paxson (Descendants film series); Grace Narducci (Descendants: The Rise of Red, young)
- Voiced by: Verna Felton (in Cinderella); Russi Taylor (1986–2015); Barbara Dirikson (2019–present); Grey DeLisle (The Wonderful World of Mickey Mouse)
- Species: Fairy
- Children: Jane (Descendants)

The Fairy Godmother (voiced by Verna Felton in the first film, by Russi Taylor in sequels and other media, and Grey DeLisle in The Wonderful World of Mickey Mouse) is Cinderella's gentle fairy godmother.

==== In Cinderella films ====
In the first film, she appears after Cinderella's stepsisters tear up her dress, using her magic to transform her gown into a dress, the mice into stallions, Bruno the dog into a footman, Major the horse into a coachman, and a pumpkin into a white coach. However, she warns Cinderella that the magic will run out at midnight.

In Cinderella II: Dreams Come True, she reads the story of Cinderella to the animals until Gus and Jaq arrive. They then decide to make a new book to narrate what happens after her "happily ever after". In the segment Tall Tail, she turns Jaq into a human so he can help Cinderella in the palace.

In Cinderella III: A Twist in Time, her wand is stolen by Anastasia, who accidentally turns her into a stone statue, and Tremaine uses its magic. By the end of the film, she is returned to normal and offers to return Cinderella and Prince Charming to their former lives, but chooses not to after realizing that their love has grown stronger than it was in the original timeline.

==== Other appearances in animation ====
Like other characters from the first film, the Fairy Godmother makes cameo appearances in House of Mouse as a guest of the club. She has a major role in "Goofy's Menu Magic", where Goofy becomes popular after using her wand to cook.

She appears in The Wonderful World of Mickey Mouse in the episode "Disappearing Act", where she appears to advise Mickey along with other magical characters.

Like other Walt Disney Animation Studios characters, she have a cameo appearance in the short film Once Upon a Studio, where she uses her magic to repair the camera used to take a group photo.

==== In video games ====
The Fairy Godmother appears as a recurring character in the Kingdom Hearts series. In the first game, she comes to live in Traverse Town with Merlin after Maleficent destroys her home world, Castle of Dreams, and restores the spirits of the beings contained in the summon gems, allowing Sora to summon them in battle. She also appears in Kingdom Hearts Birth by Sleep in the world Castle of Dreams, reprising her role from the film and shrinking Ventus and Aqua to the size of mice, and in the Re Mind DLC of Kingdom Hearts III, where Merlin and Yen Sid task her with assisting in the search for Sora by looking into Riku's dreams.

She also appears as a playable character in Disney Magic Kingdoms, and as a villager in Disney Dreamlight Valley.

==== In other media ====
Like other Cinderella characters, the Fairy Godmother is a meet-and-greet character at Disney Parks. She is also the host in the Magic, Music and Mayhem live show at Magic Kingdom.

In the live-action remake, she is portrayed by Helena Bonham Carter and serves as the narrator.

The Fairy Godmother appears in the Descendants film series, portrayed by Melanie Paxson, where she is the principal of Auradon Preparatory and has a daughter, Jane. In the first film, Maleficent seeks to steal her magic wand. She later returns in supporting roles in Descendants 2 and Descendants 3. In the fourth film, Descendants: The Rise of Red, she is the new president of Auradon University, and also a past version of her appears as a teenager, known as Fay, portrayed by Grace Narducci. The Fairy Godmother is also present in the fifth film, Descendants: Wicked Wonderland. She is the only character that is present in the five installments of the Descendants films.

=== Prince Charming ===
Prince Charming
- First appearance: Cinderella (1950)
- Created by: Milt Kahl
- Portrayed by: Richard Madden (2015 film); Paolo Montalban (Descendants); Tristan Padil (Descendants: The Rise of Red, young Josh Dela Cruz (Into the Woods)
- Voiced by: William Phipps (Cinderella, speaking); Mike Douglas (Cinderella, singing); Christopher Daniel Barnes (2002–present); Matt Nolan (Kingdom Hearts Birth by Sleep); Chris Edgerly (Welcome to the Club; Keith Ferguson (Once Upon a Studio)

In-universe information
- Aliases: King Charming (Descendants: The Rise of Red); Kit (2015 film)
- Title: Prince
- Family: Unnamed King (father); Unnamed Queen (mother, deceased)
- Spouse: Cinderella
- Significant other: Anastasia Tremaine (ex-fiancée)
- Children: Chad Charming (Descendants); Chloe Charming (Descendants)
- Relatives: Lady Tremaine (step-mother-in-law); Drizella Tremaine (step-sister-in-law); Anastasia Tremaine (step-sister-in-law); Cinderella's father (father-in-law, deceased); Cinderella's mother (mother-in-law, deceased)

Prince Charming (voiced by William Edward Phipps in the original film, singing voice provided by Mike Douglas, Christopher Daniel Barnes in the sequels) or simply The Prince, is Cinderella's love interest and husband after the first film.

Though he is known as Henry in an official advertisement from Disney France, and also has been given the name August in works such as Prince of Glass & Midnight by Linsey Miller (where he is referred to as "Prince August of Charmant") alongside 1971's Disney on Parade (where he was referred to as "Prince Otto Auguste Ferdinand"), he is referred to as "Prince Charming" in Disney media and merchandise.

==== In Cinderella films ====
In the first film, the King organizes a ball for Prince Charming so he can find a wife. After meeting Cinderella, they fall in love until she is forced to leave at midnight. After finding the slipper that she left behind, he has her try it on to prove that she was the girl he met, and they marry afterwards.

In Cinderella III: A Twist in Time, while he and Cinderella are celebrating their first anniversary, Tremaine obtains the Fairy Godmother's wand and reverses time to the moment of the Duke's arrival at her manor with the glass slipper. She then uses the wand to fit the slipper onto Anastasia's foot and make her marry Prince Charming, casting a spell on him to make him forget Cinderella and believe that he danced with Anastasia. After meeting Cinderella while she attempts to reclaim the wand, he is confused by the connection he feels with her before Gus and Jaq convince him of their story. During the wedding, Tremaine makes Anastasia look exactly like Cinderella to take her place at the wedding. After Anastasia refuses to marry him, he and Cinderella marry again.

==== Other appearances in animation ====
Like other characters from the first film, he make cameo appearances in the television series House of Mouse as a guest of the titular club.

In the short film Once Upon a Studio, he and Cinderella appear going down the stairs, where he loses a shoe, which is picked up by Max from The Little Mermaid, whom they chase to get it back. Later, he is present among the rest of Walt Disney Animation Studios characters taking a group photo.

==== In video games ====
He appears in Kingdom Hearts Birth by Sleep, reprising his role from the film.

The Prince Charming is a playable character in Disney Magic Kingdoms.

==== In other media ====
In the live-action remake, where he is portrayed by Richard Madden, he is known as Kit and first met Cinderella while hunting deer, with Cinderella believing that Kit is an apprentice training under his father. His desire to see Cinderella again led him to open the ball to commoners, and he becomes king after his father dies from illness. In revealing that he is called Kit by his father, a common nickname for Christopher, Disney revealed that his true name is Prince Christopher.

In the Descendants film series, he and Cinderella have a son, Chad, and a daughter, Chloe. He has cameo appearances in the first film during Prince Ben's coronation, and in Descendants 2 during the Cotillion, in both cases portrayed by uncredited actors. He later appears in a more relevant role in the fourth film, Descendants: The Rise of Red, as "King Charming", being portrayed by Paolo Montalban, with a teen Prince Charming being portrayed by Tristan Padil. Montalban reprises the role in the fifth film, Descendants: Wicked Wonderland.

== Supporting and minor characters ==
- The King (voiced by Luis Van Rooten in the first film, Andre Stojka in the sequels) is Prince Charming's father, who wants him to marry and have children before he dies. In Cinderella III: A Twist in Time, his wife is revealed to have died and gives the stepsisters his prized possession: the seashell that they touched together for the first time. In the live-action remake, where he is portrayed by Derek Jacobi, he dies from illness and Kit becomes king.
- The Grand Duke (voiced by Luis Van Rooten in the first film, Rob Paulsen in the sequels) is the King's majordomo, who organizes the ball for Prince Charming and visits the Tremaine manor to find the glass slipper's owner. In Cinderella III: A Twist in Time, he organizes the wedding between Charming and Anastasia. He also appears in Kingdom Hearts Birth by Sleep, where he reprises his role from the film. In the live-action remake, where he is portrayed by Stellan Skarsgård, he serves an antagonistic role by conspiring with Tremaine. By the end of the film, he, along with Tremaine and her family, leave the kingdom.
- The Mice are close friends of Cinderella, whom they help by preparing a dress for her to wear to the ball. Besides Jaq and Gus, other mice include:
  - Mert and Bert, two twin mice who accompany Jaq in search of food, collecting corn from the chickens. One of them is transformed into a horse by the Fairy Godmother to take Cinderella to the ball.
  - Luke, a short mouse who accompanies Jaq in search of food, collecting corn from the chickens. Later, he is transformed into a horse by the Fairy Godmother to take Cinderella to the ball.
  - Perla (voiced by Lucille Williams in the first film, Russi Taylor in Mickey's Magical Christmas) and Suzy (voiced by Maria Kawamura), two female mice who are part of the group in charge of sewing Cinderella's dress. Perla wears a pink dress and hat, while Suzy wears a blue dress and hat. They also appear at Disney Parks as meet-and-greet characters, and in the video game Disney Magic Kingdoms as playable characters to unlock for a limited time.
  - Mary (voiced by Russi Taylor in the second film), a female mouse wearing a pink dress and a light blue hat. While in the first film she is merely a background character, she has a major role in Cinderella II: Dreams Come True, showing that she has a romantic relationship with Jaq. She also has a cameo appearance in the short film Once Upon a Studio.
- Bruno (vocal effects provided by Jimmy MacDonald, Earl Keen in the first film, Frank Welker in the second film) is a bloodhound and Cinderella's pet dog. He is transformed into a footman by the Fairy Godmother so that Cinderella can attend the ball and later confronts Lucifer, allowing Jaq to save Gus and foil Tremaine's plans. In Cinderella II: Dreams Come True, he is shown to have moved into the palace with Cinderella, but does not appear in Cinderella III : A Twist in Time, as well as in the live-action remake. He makes a cameo appearance in the 1953 short film How to Sleep.
- Major is a horse that lives with Cinderella. He is transformed into a coachman by the Fairy Godmother so that Cinderella can attend the ball and later pulls Cinderella and Prince Charming's wedding carriage along with other horses. He also appears briefly in Kingdom Hearts Birth by Sleep, appearing in his human form as the coachman of Cinderella's carriage.
- The Birds help the mice by preparing Cinderella's dress for the ball, later searching for Bruno to help rescue Cinderella from Lucifer.
- Cinderella's Father is the deceased father of Cinderella, husband of Lady Tremaine, and stepfather of Anastasia and Drizella. Following the death of his first wife, he remarries Lady Tremaine before dying. In the live-action remake, where he is portrayed by Ben Chaplin, he has a broader role during his daughter's childhood.

== Introduced in Cinderella II: Dreams Come True ==
- Prudence (voiced by Holland Taylor) is a stern and snobbish woman who is in charge of the palace banquets and parties. Cinderella helps change her view on things through her improvements to the ball and she later falls in love with the Grand Duke. She also appears in Cinderella III: A Twist in Time.
- Beatrice and Daphne (both voiced by Russi Taylor) are ladies-in-waiting who help Cinderella with her preparations for the ball.
- Pom-Pom (vocal effects provided by Frank Welker) is a white female cat who antagonizes the mice.
- The Baker (voiced by Rob Paulsen) is a baker who Anastasia falls in love with despite Tremaine forbidding their relationship. He is given the name "Robert" in the novel Prince of Glass & Midnight by Linsey Miller.
- Countess Le Grande (voiced by Russi Taylor) is a countess who attends a meeting at the palace, where she gets scared after seeing Jaq.

== Introduced in Cinderella III: A Twist in Time ==
- The Queen was the wife of the King and the mother of Prince Charming, who in the past fell in love with the King after their hands touched, as they sensed that it was true love. She is seen in some pictures of the palace.

== Appearing in Cinderella (2015 film) ==
- Cinderella's Mother (portrayed by Hayley Atwell) is Cinderella's biological mother, who died from illness she was ten years old. She taught Cinderella to always be kind and to believe in the existence of magic and fairy godmothers. Before dying, she made her promise to have courage and be kind, for it will see her through life's trials.
- Mr. Goosey Goose (portrayed by Gareth Mason as a human) is a goose who lives with Cinderella on the farm and takes Major the horse's role, being transformed into a coachman by the Fairy Godmother so that Cinderella can attend the ball.
- The Lizards (Mr. Lizard portrayed by Tom Eden as a human) are two green lizards who live in Cinderella's garden. They take Bruno's role, being transformed into footmen.
- The Captain (portrayed by Nonso Anozie) is the captain of the royal guard. He is close friends with Kit and is loyal to him and his father.
- Princess Chelina of Zaragoza (portrayed by Jana Pérez) is a candidate to marry Kit.
- Sir Francis Tremaine was the first husband of Lady Tremaine and father of Anastasia and Drisella, until he died, with the cause of his death being unknown. He is only mentioned.
