= Leonardo Nam =

Australian actor (born 1979)

- 레오나르도 남
- Nam in 2026
- Born: 5 November 1979 (age 47); Buenos Aires, Argentina
- Citizenship: Australia; Argentina; United States (Note: Nam has triple citizenship: Australian (by naturalized), Argentine(by birth) and American (by residence).)
- Education: University of New South Wales
- Occupation: Actor
- Years active: 2001–present
- Spouse: Michael Dodge
- Children: 2

Leonardo Nam (Korean: 레오나르도 남; born 5 November 1979) is an Australian actor. Born in Argentina to South Korean immigrant parents, he emigrated to Australia as a child before moving to the United States in the 1990s to begin his career as an actor. He made his breakthrough as Roy in The Perfect Score (2004), and gained further recognition for his roles as Morimoto in The Fast and the Furious: Tokyo Drift (2006) and Brian McBrian in The Sisterhood of the Traveling Pants 2 (2008).

In 2016, Nam began starring as Felix Lutz in Westworld (2016–2020) which brought him widespread recognition.

== Early life ==
Nam was born in Buenos Aires, Argentina, to South Korean immigrant parents. At the age of six, he moved to Sydney. Nam attended Sydney Technical High School and studied architecture at the University of New South Wales. Nam left Sydney to follow his dreams of an acting career in New York City, United States, at the age of 19. He studied with several acting teachers in New York, namely Austin Pendleton and William Carden at HB Studio.

== Career ==
Before his Hollywood success, Nam traveled to New York City to pursue his acting career. His first few nights he slept in Central Park and then found jobs working as a waiter and bartender. His breakthrough role came in his performance of Roy in The Perfect Score (2004). He had a small role in the 2005 film The Sisterhood of the Traveling Pants as Brian McBrian, a hardcore gamer. He played Brian again in The Sisterhood of the Traveling Pants 2; in the sequel, his character has a larger role. Nam also made an appearance in The Fast and the Furious: Tokyo Drift (2006) as Morimoto. In 2016, he joined the cast of the HBO series Westworld. In 2018 he was featured in the music video "Waste It on Me" by Steve Aoki featuring BTS. In 2024, Nam starred in the Disney film Descendants: The Rise of Red as Maddox Hatter, a role he reprised in the 2026 sequel Descendants: Wicked Wonderland.

== Personal life ==
Nam is married to Michael Dodge. They have twin sons (born 2017) together. The family lives in San Diego.

== Filmography ==
=== Film ===
Year	Title	Role	Notes
2002	Hacks	Phuong	
2004	Debating Robert Lee	Jordan Kramer	
2004	The Perfect Score	Roy	
2005	The Sisterhood of the Traveling Pants	Brian McBrian	
2005	Little Athens	Kwon	
2006	The Fast and the Furious: Tokyo Drift	Morimoto	
2006	Undoing	Joon	
2006	10 Items or Less	Kid at Target	
2007	Finishing the Game	Eli	
2007	American Pastime	Lane Nomura	
2008	Half-Life	Scott Parker	
2008	Quid Pro Quo	Engineer	
2008	Vantage Point	Kevin Cross	
2008	The Sisterhood of the Traveling Pants 2	Brian McBrian	
2009	He's Just Not That into You	Joshua	
2009	Crossing Over	Kwan	
2012	Watching TV with the Red Chinese	Chen	
2012	One for the Money	John Cho	
2013	Snake and Mongoose	Roland Leong	
2014	Murder of a Cat	Yi Kim	
2014	Cat Run 2	Zhang	
2018	Perfect	Haskell	
2018	Happy Anniversary	Hao	
2019	DC Showcase: Death	Vincent Omata (voice)	Short film
2020	Phobias	Johnny	
2021	Yes Day	Mr. Chan	
2021	Marvelous and the Black Hole	Angus	
2023	Origin	Nathan	
2024	Descendants: The Rise of Red	Maddox Hatter	Disney+ film
2025	Love Is the Monster	Justin	
2026	Descendants: Wicked Wonderland	Maddox Hatter	

=== Television ===
Year	Title	Role	Notes
2009	Bones	Nate Grunenfelder	Episode: "The Beautiful Day in the Neighborhood"
2010	CSI: Crime Scene Investigation	Miyamoto Takahashi	Episode: "Internal Combustion"
2011	Franklin & Bash	Gene Toy	Episode: "Jennifer of Troy"
2013–2014	Betas	Michael Lau	4 episodes
2014	Royal Pains	Billy	Episode: "Electric Youth"
2014	Stalker	Howard Granger	Episode: "Skin"
2016–2020	Westworld	Felix Lutz	Recurring role Nominated — Screen Actors Guild Award for Outstanding Performance by an Ensemble in a Drama Series (2016)
2017	Hawaii Five-0	Harley Taylor	Episode: "No Matter How Much One Covers a Steaming Imu, The Smoke Will Rise"
2018	Disjointed	Jesus Bruce Lee Christ	Episode: "Main Street, USA"
2018	Corporate	Sonnet	Episode: "Weekend"
2018	The Flash	Matthew Kim / Melting Point	2 episodes
2019	Sneaky Pete	Alexandre Park-Sun	3 episodes
2019	Prince of Peoria	Mark Takimoto	Episode: "The Summer of Teddy & Emil"
2019	Historical Roasts	Bruce Lee	Episode: "Muhammad Ali"
2019	Swamp Thing	Harlan Edwards	4 episodes
2020	MacGyver	Aubrey	3 episodes
2020	Room 104	Bruce	Episode: "The Night Babby Died"
2021	The Rookie	Sato	Episode: "Revelations"
2021	Robot Chicken	Zack Martin, Chunin Exam Proctor (voice)	Episode: "May Cause Lucid Murder Dreams"
2021–2022	Pacific Rim: The Black	Rickter (voice)	
2022	Maggie	Dave	13 episodes
2022	Werewolf by Night	Liorn	Disney+ television special
2023	Star Trek: Lower Decks	Australian Street Punk (voice)	Episode: "Crisis Point 2: Paradoxus"
2023	Animaniacs	Australian Prime Minister (voice)	Episode: "Groundmouse Day Again"

=== Video games ===
Year	Title	Role	Notes
2020	Iron Man VR	Living Laser	

=== Music videos ===
Year	Title	Artist(s)	Role	Ref.
2018	"Waste It on Me"	Steve Aoki feat. BTS	Himself	
