= Elizabeth Allen Rosenbaum =

American film and television director (born 1971)

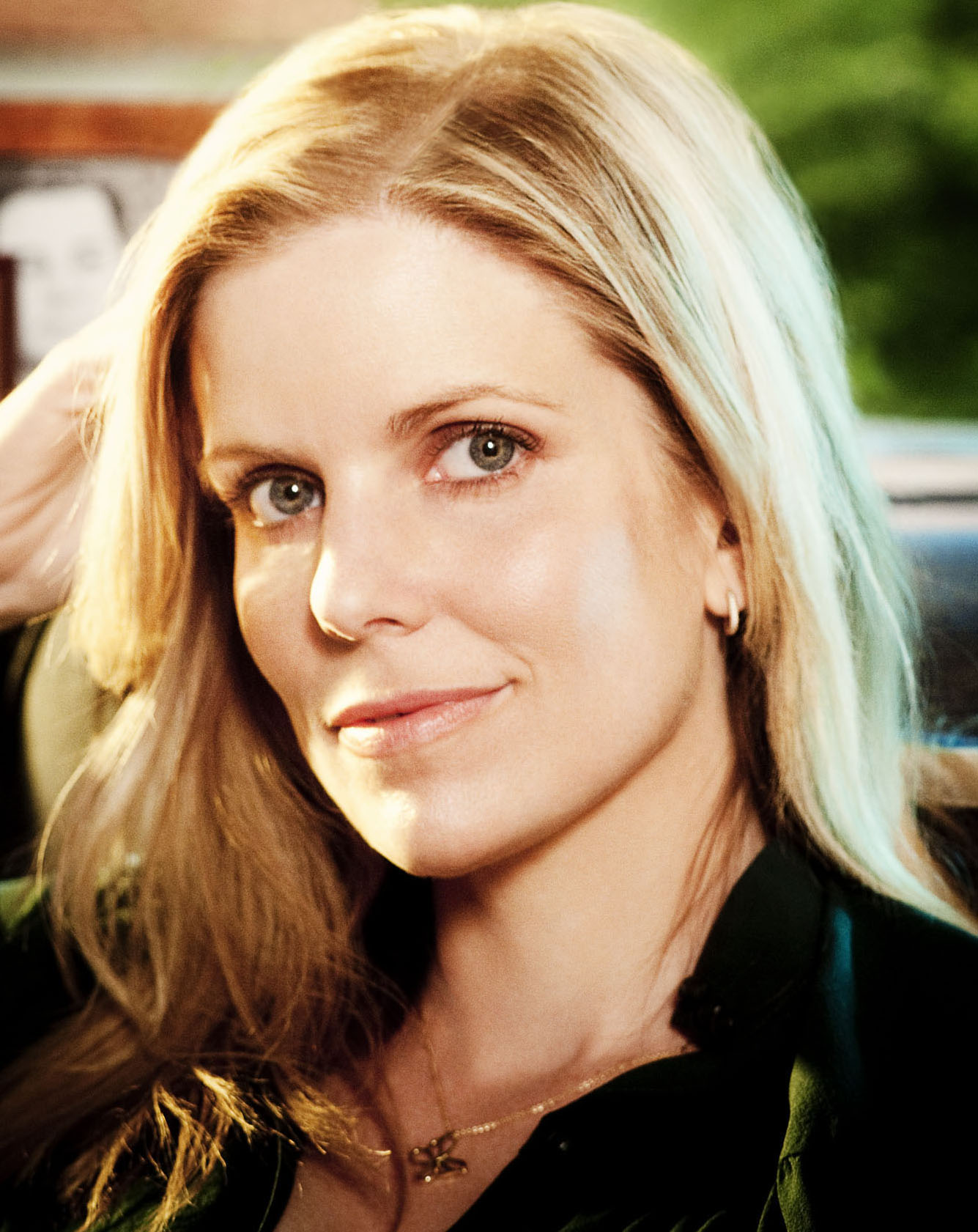
- Rosenbaum in 2010
- Born: Elizabeth Allen; 1971 (age 54–55); Stony Brook, New York, U.S.
- Education: Cornell University; USC School of Cinematic Arts
- Occupations: Film director; television director
- Years active: 1999–present
- Spouse: Scott Rosenbaum

Elizabeth Allen Rosenbaum (née Allen; born 1971) is an American film and television director. She is known for directing Purple Hearts, which became one of Netflix's most watched films in 2022, the musical Sneakerella (2022), Aquamarine (2006) and Ramona and Beezus (2010), both of which were released by 20th Century Fox. In 2020, she directed and executive produced the pilot for the ice skating drama Spinning Out and episodes of the dark comedy Dead to Me.

== Education ==
Elizabeth Allen Rosenbaum is a graduate of Cornell University. She attended graduate school at the University of Southern California.

== Career ==
Rosenbaum's directorial debut was the short film Eyeball Eddie (2001), produced at the University of Southern California under the banner of Pupil Productions. The film starred Martin Starr, Michael Rosenbaum, and M. Emmet Walsh, and screened at the Slamdance Film Festival and several other festivals, winning audience awards at the Sidewalk Moving Picture Festival and Stony Brook Film Festival.

Rosenbaum made her feature directorial debut in 2006 with the teen romantic comedy Aquamarine, filmed on location in Australia. The film was nominated for two Teen Choice Awards for "Choice Breakout Female" and "Choice Chick Flick".

In 2010, Rosenbaum directed 20th Century Fox’s Ramona and Beezus, a family comedy adapted from children's book series by author Beverly Cleary. Rosenbaum was awarded that year's Women's Image Network Award for Best Female Director for the film.

Rosenbaum directed the 2015 Starz thriller Careful What You Wish For, starring Nick Jonas in his feature film debut.

In 2020, Rosenbaum directed and executive produced the Netflix series Spinning Out, about an elite single skater. Her other work in television has included directing individual episodes of Gossip Girl, Pretty Little Liars, All American, Guilt, Why Women Kill, The Vampire Diaries and Dead to Me.

In 2022, Rosenbaum directed the musical film Sneakerella, a modern reimagining of the Cinderella fairy tale. She also became known for Purple Hearts, which became one of Netflix's most successful movies ever, but has received criticism as propaganda and for "propagating disturbing racist and misogynistic stereotypes". Rosenbaum acknowledged that the US military had demanded and received a rewrite of the script, but said, "I do hope that anyone who’s in any way insulted by it understands that our intentions are very pure, and it’s because we feel like people need to grow and need to start to become more moderate."

Rosenbaum has also taught filmmaking at USC.

== Personal life and family ==
Rosenbaum resides in Los Angeles and is a member of the DGA, the WGA, and the Editor's Guild. She is married to writer/producer Scott Rosenbaum. Her maternal cousin is Stacy Sweetser, residing in New Hampshire, who runs SweetWater Swim Studio.

== Filmography ==
Television

- Gossip Girl (2009)
- Life Unexpected (2010)
- The Vampire Diaries (2010)
- 90210 (2011)
- Dating Rules from My Future Self (2012)
- Franklin & Bash (2012)
- Emily Owens M.D. (2012)
- Star-Crossed (2014)
- Red Band Society (2014)
- The Kicks (2015)
- Mistresses (2015)
- Relationship Status (2016)
- Guilt (2016)
- The Arrangement (2017)
- MacGyver (2017)
- Famous in Love (2017)
- Empire (2017–2018)
- The Exorcist (2017)
- The Resident (2018)
- Hawaii Five-0 (2018)
- All American (2019)
- Pretty Little Liars: The Perfectionists (2019)
- BH90210 (2019)
- Why Women Kill (2019)
- Spinning Out (2020)
- Dead to Me (2020)
- Found (2024)

Film

- Eyeball Eddie (2001) (short film)
- Aquamarine (2006)
- Ramona and Beezus (2010)
- Careful What You Wish For (2015)
- Sneakerella (2022)
- Purple Hearts (2022)
- Guarding Stars (2026)

Music video

- Sofia Carson – "Come Back Home" (2022)
