= 2023 MTV Movie & TV Awards =

American awards show

- Date: May 7, 2023
- Location: Virtual
- Country: United States
- Hosted by: None (Note: Original host Drew Barrymore and other presenters withdrew in solidarity for the 2023 Writers Guild of America strike)

Highlights
- Most awards: The Last of Us (3)
- Most nominations: Stranger Things (7)

Television/radio coverage
- Network: MTV, with simulcast across other Paramount Media Networks channels.
- Viewership: 1.8 million

The 2023 MTV Movie & TV Awards were the 31st edition of the MTV Movie & TV Awards, and the sixth to jointly honor film and television. It was originally scheduled to be held on May 7, 2023, at Barker Hangar in Santa Monica, California, and be hosted by Drew Barrymore.

Due to the 2023 Writers Guild of America strike that began on May 2, 2023, Barrymore and most of the planned guests dropped out in solidarity. As a result, the traditional in-person awards ceremony did not take place, and was replaced by a broadcast-only presentation with no host.

The nominees were announced on April 5, 2023. The Last of Us won the most awards overall, with Stranger Things being the most-nominated overall, and Top Gun: Maverick being the second-most nominated overall, and most-nominated film.

== Ceremony cancellation ==
Originally, MTV announced on March 15 that Drew Barrymore would host the 2023 MTV Movie & TV Awards, which would have once again been held at the Barker Hangar. However, on May 2, the Writers Guild of America (WGA) went on strike. On May 4, it was announced that Barrymore had withdrawn from hosting in support of the strike and was agreed to return for the 2024 ceremony.

On May 5, it was reported that the ceremony's format was being revised after many of its booked guests and presenters also dropped out in solidarity. After the WGA announced its intent to picket Barker Hangar, MTV announced that the in-person ceremony had been cancelled. Executive producer Bruce Gillmer stated that MTV would be "pivoting away from a live event that still enables us to produce a memorable night full of exclusive sneak peeks, irreverent categories our audience has come to expect and countless moments that will both surprise and delight as we honor the best of film and TV over the past year".

The in-person awards presentation was replaced by a hostless virtual ceremony with pre-recorded acceptance speeches, which Variety compared to those employed during the COVID-19 pandemic due to restrictions on public gatherings (including, in particular, the Greatest of All Time special that replaced the cancelled 2020 edition). Jennifer Coolidge and Joseph Quinn used their acceptance speeches to make statements in support of the striking writers. The remainder of the telecast was filled by highlights from past editions of the ceremony, promos for other films and television series, and sketches featuring Barrymore that had been filmed prior to her withdrawal as host (including an opening sequence where she reprised her role of Josie Geller from Never Been Kissed, as well as spoofs of Barbie and Wednesday). The telecast underran its two-hour time slot by seven minutes.

== Winners and nominees ==
Deadline Hollywood reported the full list of nominees on April 5, 2023. Best Musical Moment nominees were announced on April 27, 2023.

=== Film and scripted television ===
Best Movie	Best Show
Scream VI; Avatar: The Way of Water; Black Panther: Wakanda Forever; Elvis; Nope; Smile; Top Gun: Maverick	The Last of Us; Stranger Things; The White Lotus; Wednesday; Wolf Pack; Yellowjackets; Yellowstone
Best Performance in a Movie	Best Performance in a Show
Tom Cruise – Top Gun: Maverick; Austin Butler – Elvis; Florence Pugh – Don't Worry Darling; Keke Palmer – Nope; Michael B. Jordan – Creed III	Jenna Ortega – Wednesday; Aubrey Plaza – The White Lotus; Christina Ricci – Yellowjackets; Riley Keough – Daisy Jones & the Six; Sadie Sink – Stranger Things; Selena Gomez – Only Murders in the Building
Best Comedic Performance	Best Hero
Adam Sandler – Murder Mystery 2; Dylan O'Brien – Not Okay; Jennifer Coolidge – Shotgun Wedding; Keke Palmer – Nope; Quinta Brunson – Abbott Elementary	Pedro Pascal — The Last of Us; Diego Luna — Andor; Jenna Ortega — Wednesday; Paul Rudd — Ant-Man and the Wasp: Quantumania; Tom Cruise — Top Gun: Maverick
Best Villain	Best Kiss
Elizabeth Olsen — Doctor Strange in the Multiverse of Madness; Harry Styles – Don't Worry Darling; Jamie Campbell Bower — Stranger Things; M3GAN (portrayed by Jenna Davis and Amie Donald) – M3GAN; The Bear — Cocaine Bear	Madison Bailey + Rudy Pankow – Outer Banks; Anna Torv + Philip Prajoux – The Last of Us; Harry Styles + David Dawson – My Policeman; Riley Keough + Sam Claflin – Daisy Jones & the Six; Selena Gomez + Cara Delevingne – Only Murders in the Building
Most Frightened Performance	Best Fight
Jennifer Coolidge – The White Lotus; Jesse Tyler Ferguson – Cocaine Bear; Justin Long – Barbarian; Rachel Sennott – Bodies Bodies Bodies; Sosie Bacon – Smile	Courteney Cox (Gale Weathers) vs. Ghostface – Scream VI; Brad Pitt (Ladybug) vs. Bad Bunny (The Wolf) – Bullet Train; Jamie Campbell Bower (Vecna) vs. Millie Bobby Brown (Eleven) – Stranger Things; Keanu Reeves (John Wick) vs. Everyone – John Wick 4; Escape from Narkina 5 - Andor
Best Breakthrough Performance	Best Duo
Joseph Quinn – Stranger Things; Bad Bunny – Bullet Train; Bella Ramsey – The Last of Us; Emma D'Arcy – House of the Dragon; Rachel Sennott – Bodies Bodies Bodies	Pedro Pascal + Bella Ramsey – The Last of Us; Camila Mendes + Maya Hawke – Do Revenge; Jenna Ortega + Victor Dorobantu (as Thing) – Wednesday; Simona Tabasco + Beatrice Grannò – The White Lotus; Tom Cruise + Miles Teller – Top Gun: Maverick
Best Kick-Ass Cast	Best Song
Stranger Things; Ant-Man & The Wasp: Quantumania; Black Panther: Wakanda Forever; Outer Banks; Teen Wolf: The Movie	Taylor Swift – "Carolina" (Where The Crawdads Sing); Demi Lovato – "Still Alive" (Scream VI); Doja Cat – "Vegas" (Elvis); Lady Gaga – "Hold My Hand" (Top Gun: Maverick); OneRepublic – "I Ain't Worried" (Top Gun: Maverick); Rihanna – "Lift Me Up" (Black Panther: Wakanda Forever)
Best Musical Moment
"Come Back Home" – Purple Hearts; "Big Boys" – Saturday Night Live; "Body" – She-Hulk: Attorney at Law; "Goo Goo Muck" – Wednesday; "I Will Survive" (Bachelorette Party) – Ginny & Georgia; Jack's Tap Dance – Don't Worry Darling; "Look at Us Now (Honeycomb)" - Daisy Jones & The Six; "Long, Long Time" (Bill & Frank Play Piano) – The Last of Us; "Naatu Naatu" – RRR; "Revolting Children" – Matilda the Musical; "Running Up That Hill" – Stranger Things; "Simon's Song" – Young Royals; "This Love (Taylor's Version)" – The Summer I Turned Pretty; "Titanium" – M3GAN; "Trouble" – Elvis; "You Should See Me in a Crown" – The School for Good and Evil

=== Unscripted television ===
Best Music Documentary	Best Docu-Reality Show
Selena Gomez: My Mind & Me; Halftime; Love, Lizzo; Sheryl; The Day the Music Died: The Story of Don McLean's American Pie	The Kardashians; Jersey Shore: Family Vacation; The Real Housewives of Beverly Hills; Family Reunion: Love & Hip Hop Edition; Vanderpump Rules
Best Competition Series	Best Host
RuPaul's Drag Race All Stars; All Star Shore; Big Brother; The Challenge: USA; The Traitors	Drew Barrymore – The Drew Barrymore Show; Joel Madden – Ink Master; Nick Cannon – The Masked Singer; RuPaul – RuPaul's Drag Race; Kelly Clarkson – The Kelly Clarkson Show
Best Reality On-Screen Team
Ariana Madix, Katie Maloney, Scheana Shay, LaLa Kent – Vanderpump Rules; Michael "The Situation" Sorrentino, Vinny Guadagnino, Pauly D (MVP) – Jersey Shore: Family Vacation; Tori Deal and Devin Walker – The Challenge: Ride or Dies; RuPaul Charles and Michelle Visage – RuPaul's Drag Race; Garcelle Beauvais and Sutton Stracke – The Real Housewives of Beverly Hills

=== Comedic Genius Award ===
- Jennifer Coolidge

== Multiple nominations ==
=== Film ===
The following movies received multiple nominations:

- Six - Top Gun: Maverick
- Four - Elvis
- Three - Black Panther: Wakanda Forever, Don't Worry Darling, Nope, Scream VI
- Two - Ant-Man & The Wasp: Quantumania, Bullet Train, Bodies Bodies Bodies, Cocaine Bear, M3GAN, Smile

=== Television ===
The following television series received multiple nominations:

- Seven - Stranger Things
- Six - The Last of Us
- Five - Wednesday
- Four - The White Lotus
- Three - Daisy Jones & the Six
- Two - Andor, Jersey Shore: Family Vacation, Only Murders in the Building, Outer Banks, RuPaul's Drag Race, The Real Housewives of Beverly Hills, Vanderpump Rules, Yellowstone

== See also ==
- 65th Golden Globe Awards, another award ceremony that was downsized due to a WGA strike.
