= List of number-one hits of 1985 (Germany) =

This is a list of singles to top the German Media Control Top100 Singles Chart in 1985.

Key
| † | Indicates best-performing single and album of 1985 |

| Issue date | Song | Artist | Album | Artist |
|---|---|---|---|---|
| 7 January | "Do They Know It's Christmas?" | Band Aid | Arena | Duran Duran |
| 14 January | "Do They Know It's Christmas?" | Band Aid | Arena | Duran Duran |
| 21 January | "One Night in Bangkok" | Murray Head | Arena | Duran Duran |
| 28 January | "One Night in Bangkok" | Murray Head | Diamond Life | Sade |
| 4 February | "Shout" | Tears for Fears | Agent Provocateur | Foreigner |
| 11 February | "Shout" | Tears for Fears | Agent Provocateur | Foreigner |
| 18 February | "Shout" | Tears for Fears | Agent Provocateur | Foreigner |
| 25 February | "Shout" | Tears for Fears | Agent Provocateur | Foreigner |
| 4 March | "You're My Heart, You're My Soul" | Modern Talking | Agent Provocateur | Foreigner |
| 11 March | "You're My Heart, You're My Soul" | Modern Talking | Vulture Culture | The Alan Parsons Project |
| 18 March | "You're My Heart, You're My Soul" | Modern Talking | No Jacket Required | Phil Collins |
| 25 March | "You're My Heart, You're My Soul" | Modern Talking | Songs From The Big Chair | Tears for Fears |
| 1 April | "You're My Heart, You're My Soul" | Modern Talking | No Jacket Required | Phil Collins |
| 8 April | "You're My Heart, You're My Soul" | Modern Talking | No Jacket Required | Phil Collins |
| 15 April | "Live Is Life" † | Opus | No Jacket Required | Phil Collins |
| 22 April | "Live Is Life" † | Opus | No Jacket Required | Phil Collins |
| 29 April | "Live Is Life" † | Opus | No Jacket Required | Phil Collins |
| 6 May | "Live Is Life" † | Opus | No Jacket Required | Phil Collins |
| 13 May | "Live Is Life" † | Opus | No Jacket Required | Phil Collins |
| 20 May | "Live Is Life" † | Opus | No Jacket Required | Phil Collins |
| 27 May | "Live Is Life" † | Opus | The 1st Album | Modern Talking |
| 3 June | "You Can Win If You Want" | Modern Talking | The 1st Album | Modern Talking |
| 10 June | "19" | Paul Hardcastle | The 1st Album | Modern Talking |
| 17 June | "19" | Paul Hardcastle | Brothers in Arms | Dire Straits |
| 24 June | "19" | Paul Hardcastle | The 1st Album | Modern Talking |
| 1 July | "19" | Paul Hardcastle | Born in the U.S.A. † | Bruce Springsteen |
| 8 July | "19" | Paul Hardcastle | Born in the U.S.A. † | Bruce Springsteen |
| 15 July | "19" | Paul Hardcastle | Born in the U.S.A. † | Bruce Springsteen |
| 22 July | "Rock Me Amadeus" | Falco | Born in the U.S.A. † | Bruce Springsteen |
| 29 July | "Rock Me Amadeus" | Falco | Born in the U.S.A. † | Bruce Springsteen |
| 5 August | "Rock Me Amadeus" | Falco | Born in the U.S.A. † | Bruce Springsteen |
| 12 August | "Rock Me Amadeus" | Falco | Born in the U.S.A. † | Bruce Springsteen |
| 19 August | "We Don't Need Another Hero" | Tina Turner | Born in the U.S.A. † | Bruce Springsteen |
| 26 August | "We Don't Need Another Hero" | Tina Turner | Born in the U.S.A. † | Bruce Springsteen |
| 2 September | "We Don't Need Another Hero" | Tina Turner | Born in the U.S.A. † | Bruce Springsteen |
| 9 September | "We Don't Need Another Hero" | Tina Turner | Born in the U.S.A. † | Bruce Springsteen |
| 16 September | "Maria Magdalena" | Sandra | Like a Virgin | Madonna |
| 23 September | "Maria Magdalena" | Sandra | Sonne in der Nacht | Peter Maffay |
| 30 September | "Maria Magdalena" | Sandra | Sonne in der Nacht | Peter Maffay |
| 7 October | "Maria Magdalena" | Sandra | Sonne in der Nacht | Peter Maffay |
| 14 October | "Cheri, Cheri Lady" | Modern Talking | Sonne in der Nacht | Peter Maffay |
| 21 October | "Cheri, Cheri Lady" | Modern Talking | Sonne in der Nacht | Peter Maffay |
| 28 October | "Cheri, Cheri Lady" | Modern Talking | Sonne in der Nacht | Peter Maffay |
| 4 November | "Cheri, Cheri Lady" | Modern Talking | Sonne in der Nacht | Peter Maffay |
| 11 November | "Take On Me" | A-ha | Movin' | Jennifer Rush |
| 18 November | "Take On Me" | A-ha | Movin' | Jennifer Rush |
| 25 November | "Take On Me" | A-ha | Movin' | Jennifer Rush |
| 2 December | "Take On Me" | A-ha | Movin' | Jennifer Rush |
| 9 December | "Take On Me" | A-ha | Movin' | Jennifer Rush |
| 16 December | "Nikita" | Elton John | Movin' | Jennifer Rush |
| 23 December | "Nikita" | Elton John | Movin' | Jennifer Rush |
| 30 December | No release (Note: Same issue as for 23 December.) | | | |

== See also ==
- List of number-one hits (Germany)
