= Purple Hearts (soundtrack) =

Purple Hearts (Original Soundtrack)

Soundtrack album by Sofia Carson
- Released: July 29, 2022
- Length: 23:22
- Label: Hollywood
- Producer: Eren Cannata; Daniel Crean

Sofia Carson chronology
Sofia Carson (2022)	Purple Hearts (Original Soundtrack) (2022)

Singles from Purple Hearts (Original Soundtrack)
- 1. "Come Back Home" Released: July 12, 2022

Purple Hearts (Original Soundtrack) is the official soundtrack to the 2022 Netflix film Purple Hearts. Sofia Carson, who plays the lead role of Cassie in the film, performs all eight songs from the soundtrack and co-wrote the first four tracks alongside Grammy nominee Justin Tranter. The album was released July 29, 2022 through Hollywood Records preceded by the lead single, "Come Back Home", on July 12, 2022. The music video for the song was released on August 3, 2022.

== Writing and recording ==
In August 2021 it was announced that Carson would star in Purple Hearts, for which she would also write and perform the soundtrack. In a exclusive interview with The Hollywood Reporter Carson revealed that Netflix and her producing team trusted her with the music and to pick her writing partners. The first one she reached out to was Justin Tranter.

In an interview with Billboard, Carson explained that she has been writing songs since she was eleven years old, but she only wrote songs for herself, not from someone's else point of view. In the interview she says, "I was most definitely writing from Cassie's point of view. We wanted to kind of capture that essence for Cassie, that inspiration would hit based on the things that were happening to her in her life."

While speaking to The Wrap, Carson said that the first song that Tranter and her wrote was "Hate the Way". While they were writing for the soundtrack, Carson explained in the interview that the two of them worked so hard to make sure that Cassie was so unique, and so different from how Carson is with her music, from the way that she talks to the way she carries herself on stage. "You know, she's indie. She's rock. I've never done something like that before. When we recorded "Hate the Way" Justin was like, "You've never sung like that before. I think we found Cassie's voice." And it was so thrilling."

== Promotion and release ==
In June 2022 Netflix released the first sneak peek for the film that previews Cassie playing "Come Back Home" on her piano while on a video call with Luke. The trailer for the film was released on July 12, 2022, the same day Hollywood Records released "Come Back Home" as the lead single. Two music videos for the song was released, one on August 3, 2022, that shows Carson performing a stripped-down version on her piano while performing it on the same beach that is in the film, and the other was released on August 5, 2022, that shows the full performance in Oceanside, CA outside the gates of Camp Pendleton.

== Track listing ==
Except where noted, all lyrics are written by Justin Tranter, Skyler Stonestreet and Sofia Carson, all music composed by Daniel Crean and Cannata, and all tracks produced by Crean and Cannata.

Purple Hearts (Original Soundtrack) track listing
No.	Title	Writer(s)	Length
1.	"Come Back Home"		2:56
2.	"I Hate the Way"		3:13
3.	"Blue Side of the Sky"		3:02
4.	"I Didn't Know"		3:03
5.	"Feel It Still"	Asa Taccone; Brian Holland; Eric Howk; Frederick Gorman; Georgia Dobbins; Jason Wade Sechrist; John Baldwin Gourley; John Hill; Kyle O'Quin; Robert Bateman; William Garrett; Zachary Carothers; Zoe Manville English	2:24
6.	"Sweet Caroline"	Neil Diamond	2:18
7.	"I Hate the Way" (Stripped)		3:41
8.	"Come Back Home" (Stripped)		2:41
Total length:			23:22

== Charts ==
Chart performance for Purple Hearts
Chart (2022)	Peak position
Australian Albums (ARIA)	28
Austrian Albums (Ö3 Austria)	16
Belgian Albums (Ultratop Flanders)	29
Belgian Albums (Ultratop Wallonia)	27
Canadian Albums (Billboard)	68
Dutch Albums (Album Top 100)	62
French Albums (SNEP)	48
German Albums (Offizielle Top 100)	26
Irish Compilations (OCC)	6
Lithuanian Albums (AGATA)	25
Spanish Albums (Promusicae)	76
Swiss Albums (Schweizer Hitparade)	12
UK Compilations (OCC)	7
UK Album Downloads (OCC)	4
UK Soundtrack Albums (OCC)	3
US Billboard 200	136
US Soundtrack Albums (Billboard)	6
