= Love Is the Name =

Single by Sofia Carson
- Released: April 7, 2016
- Recorded: 2015
- Genre: Pop; Latin pop
- Length: 3:27
- Label: Hollywood; Republic
- Songwriters: Steve Mac; Ina Wroldsen; Ewald Pfleger; Guenter Grasmuck; Peter Niklas Gruber; Herwig Tremschnig; Kurt Plisnier
- Producer: Mac

Sofia Carson singles chronology
"Rotten to the Core" (2015)	"Love Is the Name" (2016)	"I'm Gonna Love You" (2016)

J Balvin singles chronology
"Ginza" (2015)	"Love Is the Name" (2016)	"Bobo" (2016)

Music video
- "Love Is the Name" on YouTube

"Love Is the Name" is the debut single by American singer and actress Sofia Carson. It was written and produced by Steve Mac, with additional songwriting by Ina Wroldsen. The song was released on April 7, 2016, by Hollywood and Republic Records. An official remix featuring Colombian reggaeton singer J Balvin was also released on the same day. "Love Is the Name" includes an interpolation of Austrian band Opus' 1984 single "Live Is Life", which was the main inspiration behind its production.

Commercially, it reached the top forty on the Latin Pop Songs and Tropical Songs component charts of Billboard in the United States, and peaked inside the top thirty in Poland. The song's accompanying music video, directed by Hannah Lux Davis, portrays Carson dancing in the sunset on a beach and in a luxurious mansion. To further promote the song, Carson performed it on the 2016 Radio Disney Music Awards. It was later included as a bonus track on the Japanese CD edition of Carson's 2022 self-titled debut studio album.

== Background and release ==
"Love Is the Name" was written and produced by Steve Mac, with additional songwriting by Ina Wroldsen. The song is an interpolation of Austrian band Opus' 1984 single "Live Is Life", which was the main inspiration behind its production; therefore, the band members are also credited as songwriters. Initially, it was listed on BMI with American singer Demi Lovato as the designated artist; however, "Love is the Name" was eventually recorded and released by Carson after she signed a worldwide record deal with Hollywood and Republic Records. The singer revealed that "it was a collective decision between the two labels, the [recording] team, and [herself]" to release it as her debut single:

"I think the fact that the original song was such a global hit already helped a lot, because that melody is very infectious and already in people's minds. We also loved that the song sounded so global, and that's what we want with my music. We want it to be global and very international sounding. We all thought it was a terrific track because I'm a dancer, and dancing is who I am as a performer."

"Love Is the Name" was first serviced to contemporary hit radio on April 7, 2016, in the United States, with a premiere on Radio Disney that same day. The song was then made available for sale and global streaming on April 8, along with a remix featuring Colombian reggaeton singer J Balvin. According to Griselda Flores of Billboard, he adds "Latin flavor to the track with flirtatious Spanish lyrics" such as "No sigas buscando que tú eres para mí (Stop searching because you are meant for me)". Lyrically, Carson described the song as a "celebration of love," further adding that "when I first heard the track [...], I flipped. I rolled down all my windows and turned [it up] so loud." Official remixes by DJ Laszlo, Nando Pro, Mack & Jet Set Vega, MADIZIN and Moto Blanco were also commissioned.

== Promotion ==
The music video for "Love Is the Name" was directed by Hannah Lux Davis and produced by Brandon Bonfiglio, with choreography done by Teresa Espinosa. It was filmed in a luxurious mansion, and includes shots of the singer dancing in the sunset on a beach. The video officially premiered on Disney Channel during Carson's 23rd birthday, on April 10, 2016. On the same day, it was announced that the singer would star in a series of three featurettes called Being Sofia, to further promote the release of the song. On April 30, 2016, Carson recorded a performance of the song on the 2016 Radio Disney Music Awards, which aired the following day. She was also named Radio Disney's "Next Big Thing", with a series of videos on her journey launching her music career being released. A remix video featuring J Balvin was released on May 17, 2016. Two years later, on April 17, 2018, the main version of the video surpassed 100 million views on Vevo.

== Formats and track listings ==
- Digital download
1. "Love Is the Name" – 3:27
- Digital download (Remix)
1. "Love Is the Name" (featuring J Balvin) – 3:52
- Digital download (DJ Laszlo Remix)
1. "Love Is the Name" [DJ Laszlo Remix] – 4:27
- Digital download (Mack and Jet Set Vega Remix)
1. "Love Is the Name" [Mack and Jet Set Vega Remix] – 4:19
- Digital download (MADIZIN Remix)
1. "Love Is the Name" (featuring J Balvin) [MADIZIN Remix] – 3:19
- Digital download (Moto Blanco Remix)
1. "Love Is the Name" [Moto Blanco Remix] – 4:56
- Digital download (Nando Pro Remix)
1. "Love Is the Name" (featuring J Balvin) [Nando Pro Latin Urban Remix] – 3:47

== Charts ==
Chart (2016)	Peak position
Poland Airplay (ZPAV)	22
US Latin Pop Songs (Billboard)	36
US Tropical Songs (Billboard)	28

== Radio and release history ==
Location	Date	Format	Version	Label	Ref.
United States	April 7, 2016	Contemporary hit radio	Original	Hollywood; Republic	
Worldwide	April 8, 2016	Digital download	Original, Remix featuring J Balvin	Hollywood; Republic	
Worldwide	June 24, 2016	Digital download	MADIZIN Remix	Hollywood; Republic	
Worldwide	July 1, 2016	Digital download	Nando Pro Latin Urban Remix	Hollywood; Republic	
Worldwide	July 8, 2016	Digital download	Mack and Jet Set Vega Remix	Hollywood; Republic	
Worldwide	August 5, 2016	Digital download	Moto Blanco Remix	Hollywood; Republic	
Worldwide	August 12, 2016	Digital download	DJ Laszlo Remix	Hollywood; Republic	
