= Faking It season 1 =

Faking It
- Season 1
- Promotional poster and DVD cover art
- No. of episodes: 8

Release
- Original network: MTV
- Original release: April 22 – June 10, 2014

Season chronology
- Next → Season 2

The first season of Faking It, an American single-camera romantic comedy, starred Rita Volk, Katie Stevens, Gregg Sulkin, Michael Willett and Bailey De Young. It was developed by Carter Covington and created by Dana Min Goodman and Julia Wolov, premiered on April 22, 2014, and concluded on June 10, 2014, on the MTV network. The season featured 8 episodes.

== Plot ==
Hester High School is a place where being different is what makes you popular. When outcast sophomore students Karma Ashcroft (Katie Stevens) and her best friend Amy Raudenfeld (Rita Volk) are mistaken for a lesbian couple, they find themselves the center of the school's attention, so they decide to go along with the charade.

They are invited to a party hosted by popular gay student Shane Harvey (Michael Willett). With the intention of impressing Shane's best friend, Liam Booker (Gregg Sulkin), Karma attends the party with Amy, who is not entirely sure she wants to continue with the lie. When they are unexpectedly nominated as homecoming queens, they are forced to kiss in front of the entire school in order to maintain their new popular status, but Amy is slowly discovering that she might not actually be faking it.

== Cast and characters ==
=== Main cast ===
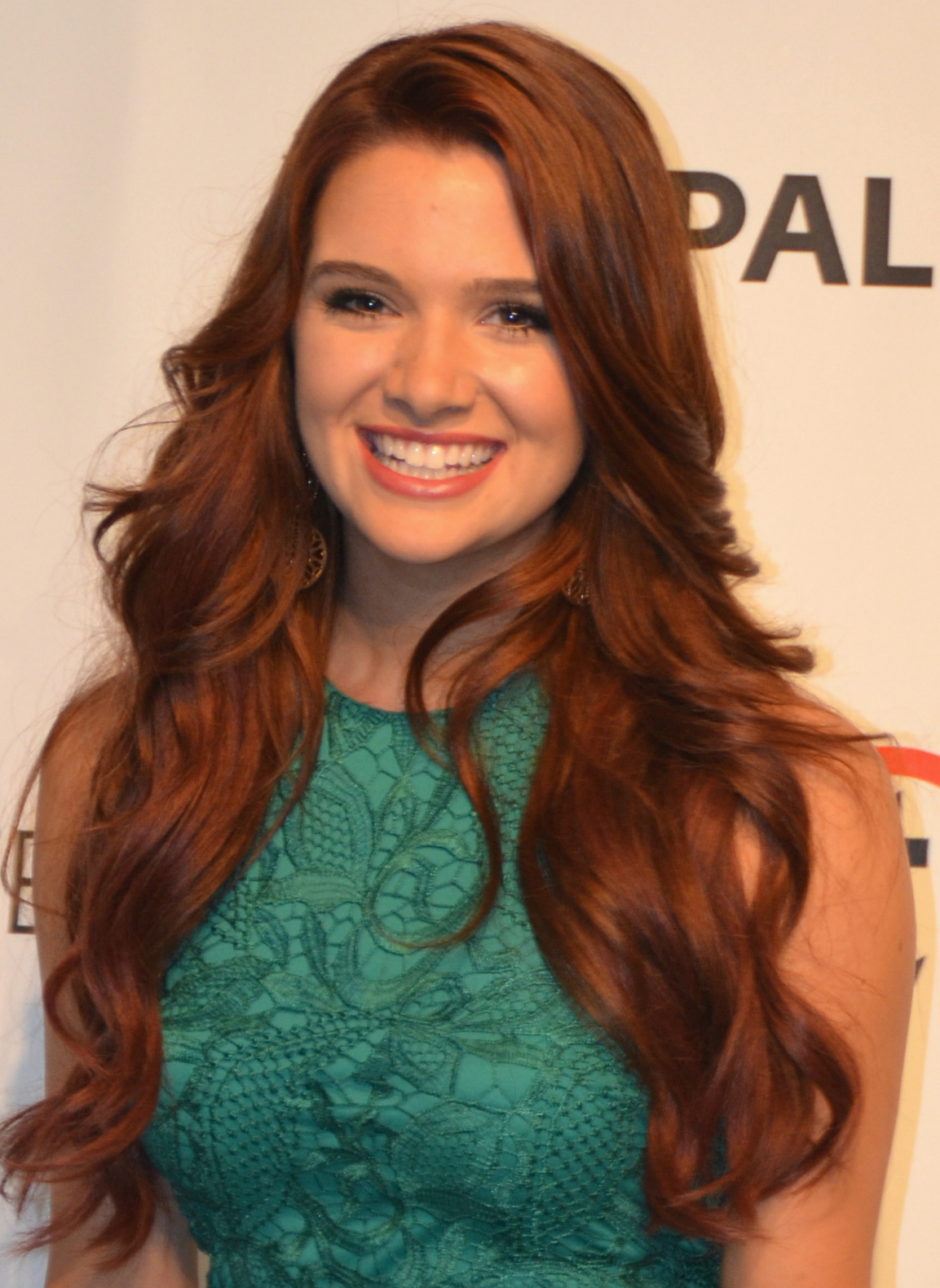
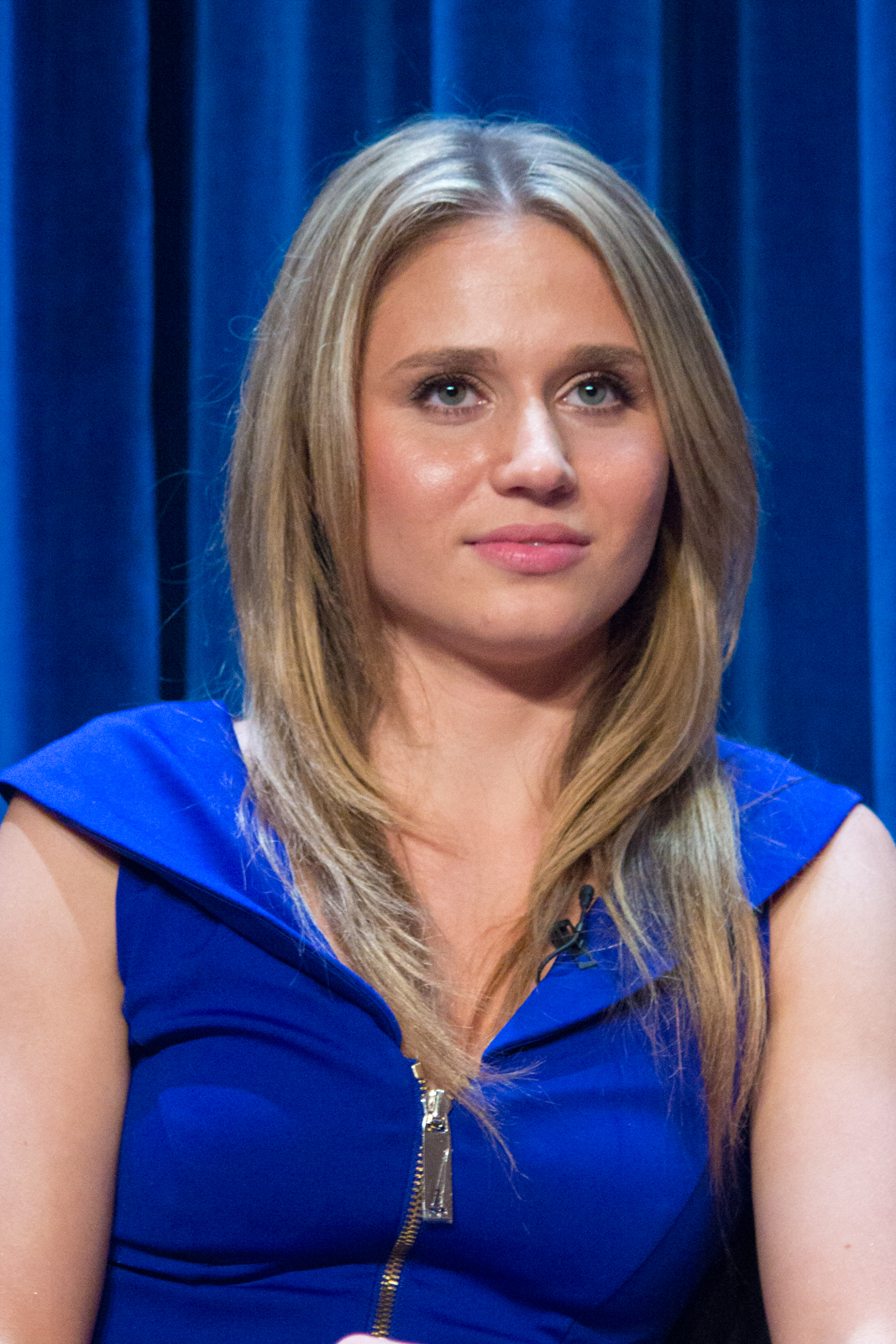
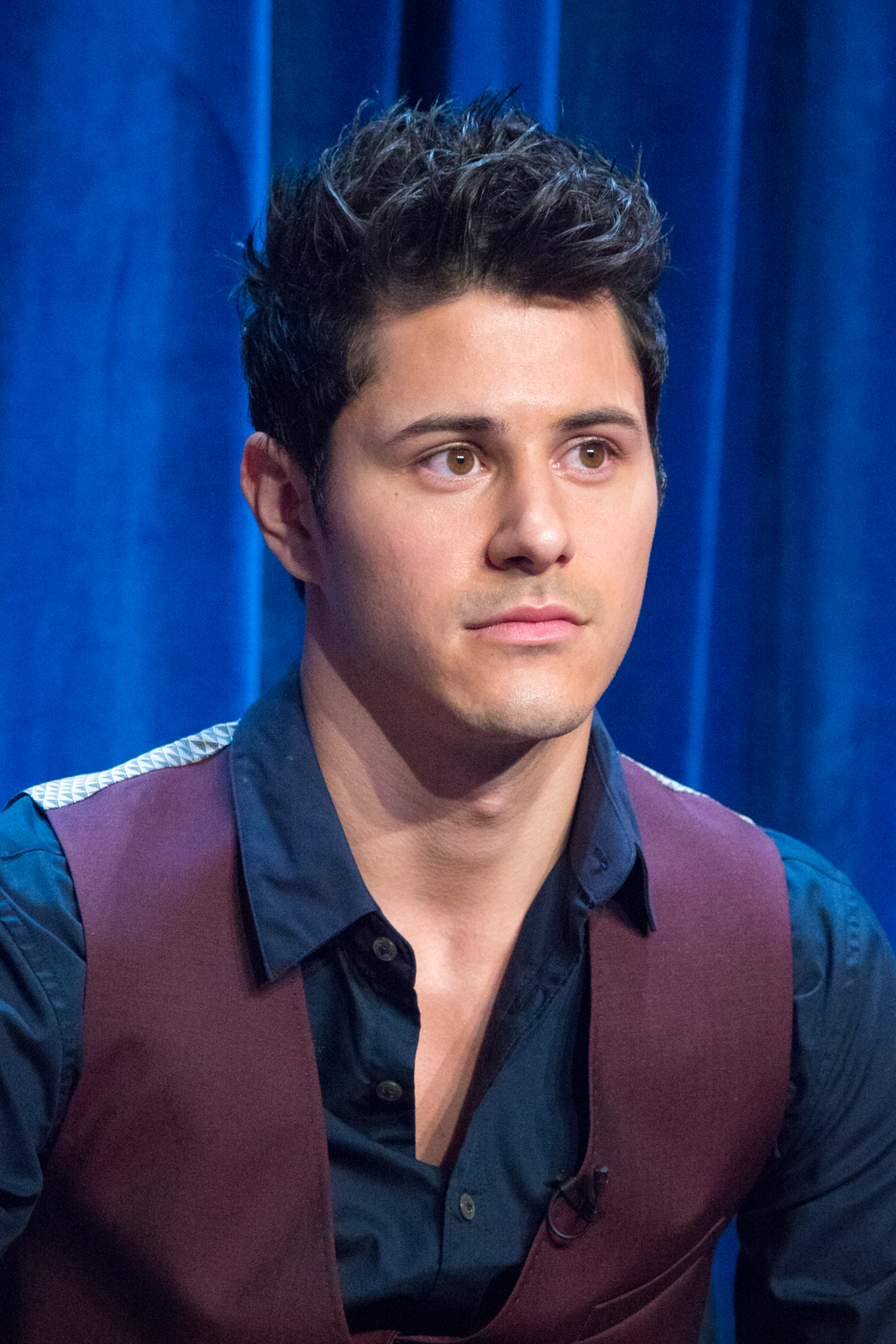
Katie Stevens, Rita Volk and Michael Willett (left to right).
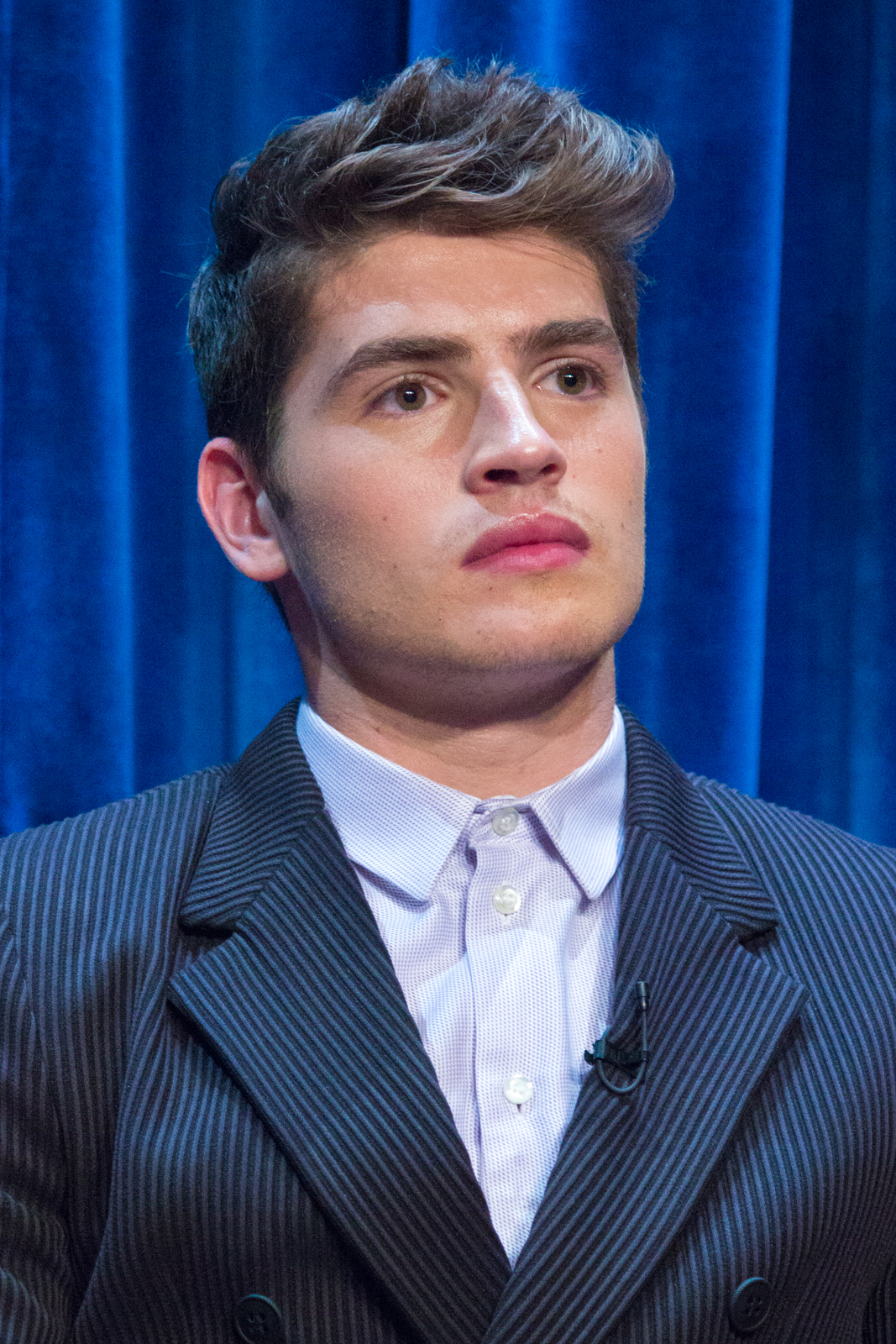
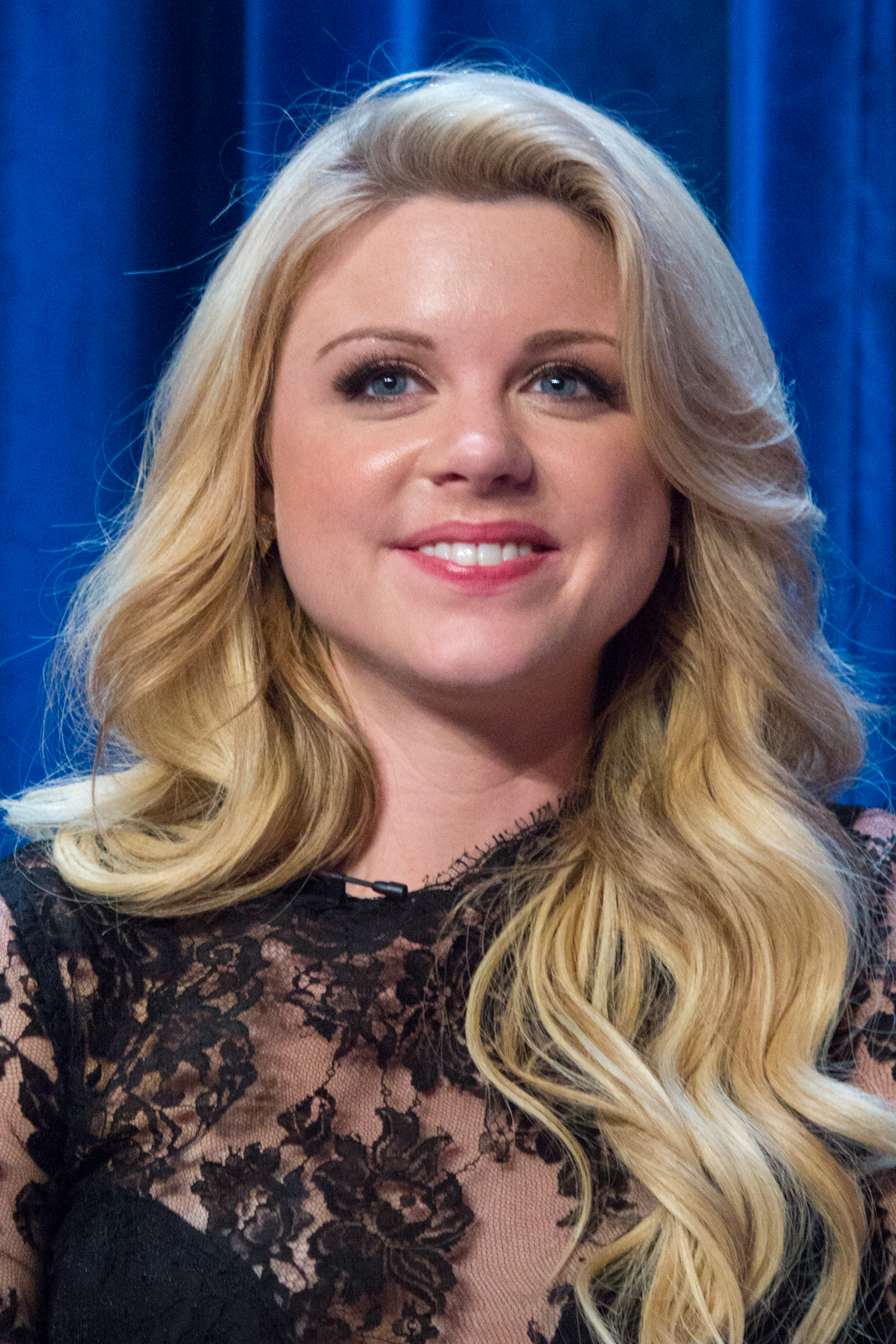
Gregg Sulkin and Bailey De Young (left to right).
- Katie Stevens as Karma Ashcroft
- Rita Volk as Amy Raudenfeld
- Gregg Sulkin as Liam Booker
- Michael Willett as Shane Harvey
- Bailey De Young as Lauren Cooper

=== Recurring cast ===
- Rebecca McFarland as Farrah
- Senta Moses as Penelope Bevier
- Erick Lopez as Tommy Ortega
- Courtney Kato as Leila
- Breezy Eslin as Elizabeth
- Anthony Palacios as Pablo
- Amy Farrington as Molly
- Lance Barber as Lucas
- Dan Gauthier as Bruce Cooper
- Courtney Henggeler as Robin

=== Guest star ===
- Sofia Carson as Soleil

== Production ==
In October 2013, MTV announced series orders for Faking It and Happyland, both consisting of eight episodes each. All episodes were broadcast on the time slot of Tuesdays from 10:30 PM–11:00 PM EST.

== Episodes ==
No. overall	No. in season	Title	Directed by	Written by	Original release date	US viewers (millions)
1	1	"Pilot"	Jamie Travis	Carter Covington	April 22, 2014	1.17
Best friends Karma and Amy go to Hester High School in Austin, Texas, where being different makes you popular. Karma has tried many things to get in with the cool crowd but nothing has made them stand out until Shane, a popular kid in school, mistakes them for lesbians and invites them to his party. He mistakenly outs them and nominates them for prom queens. Basking in her new-found popularity, Karma convinces a reluctant Amy to continue the ruse. Amy's soon-to-be stepsister Lauren (and rival for homecoming queen) is infuriated by this and publicly reveals at a school assembly that the girls are "Faking It". Amy kisses Karma in an attempt to defend Karma from public humiliation at the hands of Lauren. The kiss makes Amy aware that her feelings for Karma are more complex than she realized. This is the first appearance of the "Woah, I Know" tagline that is repeated throughout the series.
2	2	"Homecoming Out"	Jamie Travis	Carter Covington	April 29, 2014	0.86
Lauren threatens to out Amy to her conservative divorced mother as Hester High gets ready for their first-ever same-sex Homecoming Dance. Liam and Karma continue their affair but when Liam tells her that he always wanted to have sex with a lesbian, she 'breaks up' with him. Amy asks Shane to be her fake date for the Homecoming Dance so her mother (a TV meteorologist) won't know she's a lesbian. Amy's mom's first news reporting assignment, however, is to report on the first-ever Homecoming queens. Amy tries to stop her, but in the end she comes out of the closet, upsetting her mother.
3	3	"We Shall Overcompensate"	Jamie Travis	Drew Hancock	May 6, 2014	0.93
When big company Skwerkel tries to buy the students' private information through free technology, Liam starts a protest, and Karma rapidly joins in (if only to try to halt the 'pro-mance' of Liam and Soleil, a fellow protester). Meanwhile, Amy tries to find a secret boyfriend, settling on Oliver, a cute loner.
4	4	"Know Thy Selfie"	Claire Scanlon	Megan Hearne	May 13, 2014	0.86
When Karma doesn't want to help with her eccentric hippy parents' juice truck business, Liam steps in instead, angering Karma. They end up bonding over the fact that they both have issues with their dysfunctional families. Meanwhile, Amy visits a lesbian coffee shop with Shane to try to find a girlfriend. Shane helps Lauren make boudoir photos for Tommy.
5	5	"Remember the Croquembouche"	Claire Scanlon	Carrie Rosen	May 20, 2014	0.89
Karma sleeps over at Amy's house. They are told by Amy's mother that they must accompany Lauren to pick up the special dessert that she has ordered for her bridal shower party. Amy finds out that Lauren has been made the maid of honor (as opposed to her natural daughter, Amy) and tries to prove to everyone that Lauren is only doing this to make her upset. In the end, she finds out that Lauren feels that Amy's mom is her only friend in her new town.
6	6	"Three to Tango"	Claire Scanlon	George Northy	May 27, 2014	0.95
Liam refuses to cheat with Karma; Karma claims she and Amy have an open relationship and to prove it proposes they have a threesome. Amy refuses, but Shane convinces her this is an ideal opportunity to see if Karma will reciprocate Amy's feelings, and Amy agrees. At the threesome, Amy confidently kisses an obviously nervous Karma, who seems to reciprocate, leading to the second instance of "Woah, I Know". When Liam moves to kiss Amy, Karma becomes upset and runs out.
7	7	"Faking Up Is Hard to Do"	Jamie Travis	Wendy Goldman	June 3, 2014	0.98
Karma persuades Amy that they should 'break up'. Lauren gathers a group of Liam's exes to confront him. Amy and Karma decide to finally just be friends, and Karma and Liam hook up.
8	8	"Burnt Toast"	Jamie Travis	Carter Covington	June 10, 2014	0.96
Amy gives a speech at her mother's wedding, which makes Karma suspect the truth. Karma confronts Amy, and Amy finally admits her feelings: she really is a lesbian and in love with Karma. Unfortunately, Karma doesn't feel the same way. At the same time, Shane tells Liam the truth about Karma and Amy's fake relationship. Afterwards, Karma tells Liam that her relationship with Amy is finally over, but Liam confronts Karma with the truth and she is forced to finally come clean. Liam ends his relationship with Karma. Later the same night, Liam and Amy are shown drunkenly having sex.

== Reception ==
=== Reviews ===
Faking It received generally favorable reviews from critics, receiving a 71 score on Metacritic, based on eight reviews as well as a 71% for season 1 on Rotten Tomatoes based on seven reviews. New York Times said the following: "Faking It isn't anything more than a smarter-than-average high school comedy, but there's a freshness to it, perhaps because so many of the key people involved are relative newcomers." New York Daily News said, "The engine driving this show is female friendship, the kind strong enough to get you through even high school. For Amy and Karma, we want that." And Entertainment Weekly stated, "Credit the winning cast, especially Volk, and executive producer Carter Covington's sweet/snarky tone for a half hour viewers won't have to pretend to love."

=== Awards and nominations ===
Year	Association	Category	Nominee(s)	Result
2014	Teen Choice Awards	Breakout Show	Faking It	Won

== Home media ==
The show is available for digital download on iTunes and Amazon.com. Although there hasn't been a wide DVD/BD release, on October 15, 2014, "The Complete Season 1" was made available for purchase in DVD (Region 1) format per Manufactured on Demand (MOD) on Amazon.com
