= Hermes House Band =

Dutch pop band

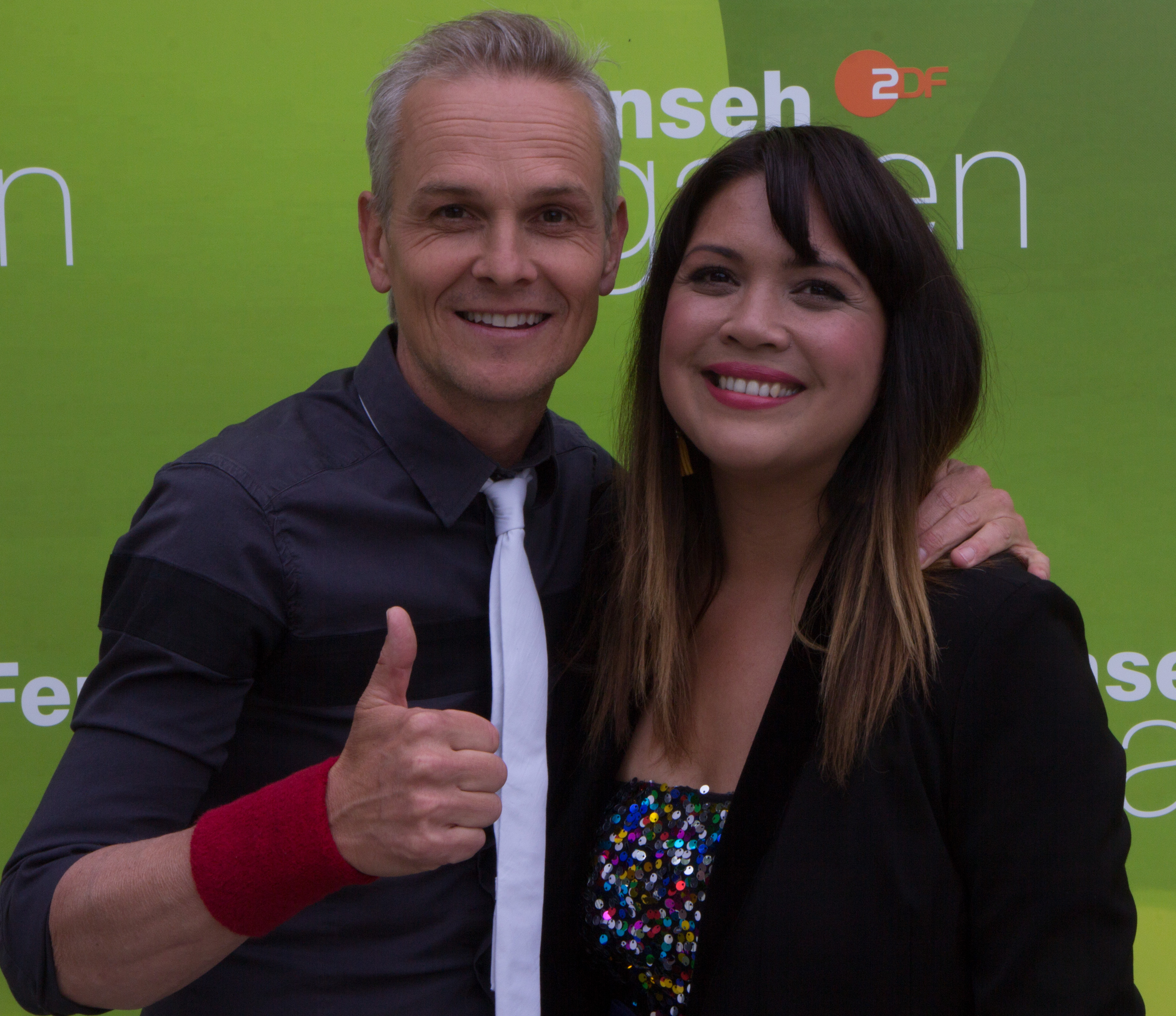
- Hermes House Band in 2018

Background information
- Origin: Rotterdam, Netherlands
- Genres: Dance-pop, Eurodance
- Years active: 1984–present
- Members: Miss Sally; Mr. Jop; Bas Vegas; Pim Kamp; Lex Flex; Yoran Aarssen; Eric Brugmans
- Past members: Judith Ansems; Jaap Reesema; Robin McMaas; Gerben Kline Willing; Dirk Bates
- Website: hermeshouseband.com

The Hermes House Band is a Dutch pop group, established in 1982 by members of the Rotterdamsch Studenten Corps, a fraternity/sorority in Rotterdam, Netherlands. They have released more than 25 albums and singles.

== History ==
The band rose to fame in 1994 in both the Netherlands and Belgium, with their cover of Gloria Gaynor's hit single, "I Will Survive"; and as of 2018 over 1.5 million copies of the single has been sold. It was reported that when Gloria Gaynor first heard a crowd sing this version of the cover of her song while performing at a company party in the Netherlands she was "not amused". In 1998, the single became a hit in Germany, and lead singer Judith Ansems was asked to promote the song there. That year it also reached number one in France, largely because it became the anthem of Stade Français Paris Rugby and after of the national football team and that year France went on to win the FIFA World Cup. Today, in popular French culture, it is still associated with the 1998 World Cup victory. The band landed a local recording contract with Polydor and alongside Ansems, former singers Jop Wijlacker and Robin Maas, the band was asked to record other covers, including "Country Roads" and "Que Sera Sera". These were issued in Germany under HHB International. Several of these singles were also released in the Netherlands.

Their biggest hit in the United Kingdom was their cover of "Country Roads", released shortly before Christmas 2001. It peaked at No. 7 on the UK Singles Chart, and remained in the top 10 for five weeks. It reached number 1 on the Scottish Singles Chart in December 2001 and again in January 2002.

In 2002, the Hermes House Band joined forces with DJ Ötzi to cover "Live Is Life", originally by Opus. This single reached No. 2 in the French chart, and No. 50 in the UK.

In 2010, the former lead singer of the band, Jaap Reesema, won the third series of the Dutch version of X Factor.

In 2018, the band reached No. 1 in France again with their version of "I Will Survive" after the French football team repeated their winning performance in the 1998 FIFA World Cup.

== Band members ==
Current members

- Miss Sally – vocals
- Mr. Jop – vocals
- Bas Vegas – bass guitar
- Pim Kamp – keyboards
- Lex Flex – drums
- Yoran Aarssen – saxophone
- Eric Brugmans – guitar

Former members

- Judith Ansems – vocals
- Jaap Reesema – vocals
- Robin McMaas – vocals
- Gerben Kline Willing – trumpet
- Dirk Bates – trumpet
- Gerben "Kep" Bruinsma - bass guitar

== Discography ==
- The Album (2002)
- Get Ready to Party (2004)
- Greatest Hits (2006)
- Rhythm of the Nineties (2009)
- Champions – The Greatest Stadium Hits (2010)
