= Sofia Carson =

American actress and singer (born 1993)

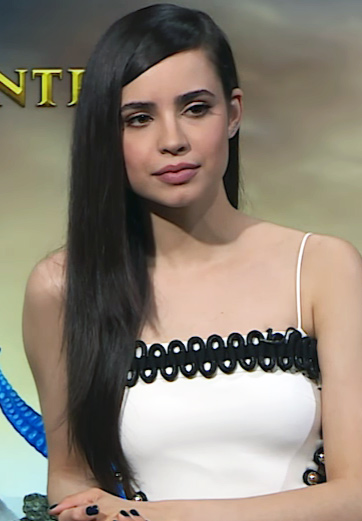
- Carson in 2017
- Born: Sofia Lauren Daccarett Char; April 10, 1993 (age 33); Fort Lauderdale, Florida, U.S.
- Education: University of California, Los Angeles
- Occupations: Singer; actress
- Years active: 2012–present
- Works: Full discography
- Musical career
- Genres: Pop; dance-pop
- Instrument: Vocals
- Labels: Hollywood; Republic

Sofia Lauren Daccarett Char (born April 10, 1993), known professionally as Sofia Carson, is an American singer and actress. Her first appearance on television was as a guest star on the Disney Channel series Austin & Ally (2014). In 2015, she received breakthrough recognition as Evie, the daughter of the Evil Queen, in the Disney musical fantasy film Descendants, and later reprised her role in its sequels. She has since starred in the Disney Channel Original Movie Adventures in Babysitting, A Cinderella Story: If the Shoe Fits (both 2016), the Netflix romantic drama film Purple Hearts (2022), the thriller film Carry-On (2024), and the romantic comedies The Life List (2025) and My Oxford Year (2025).

Carson made her musical debut in 2015 with the soundtrack album for Descendants, and in the same year released the single "Rotten to the Core". In 2016, she signed to Hollywood Records and released her debut solo single, "Love Is the Name". In 2022, she released her eponymous debut studio album, and released the Diane Warren-penned song "Applause" for the film Tell It Like a Woman.

== Early life and education ==
Carson was born Sofia Lauren Daccarett Char on April 10, 1993 in Fort Lauderdale, Florida, to José F. Daccarett and Laura Char Carson, who both moved to Florida from Barranquilla, Colombia. Sofia chose the stage name "Carson" after her American maternal grandmother, Lauraine Carson.

She attended St. Hugh Catholic School and graduated from Carrollton School of the Sacred Heart in Miami. She attended In Motion Dance Studio, where she was part of the IMPAC Youth Ensemble program, competing across the United States. She subsequently attended UCLA, majoring in communications with a minor in French.

== Career ==
=== Music ===
Carson said she is mainly influenced by pop music and admires artists who "tell stories through their music", cited 20th-century acts like The Beatles and modern acts like Ed Sheeran and Taylor Swift as influences. In 2013, Carson participated in a BMI Latina musical artist showcase. She performed as part of the cast on the 2015 Descendants soundtrack, which reached number one on the Billboard 200, including her single version of "Rotten to the Core". She was also featured on the Descendants 2 and Descendants 3 soundtracks, which reached numbers 6 and 7, respectively, on the Billboard 200.

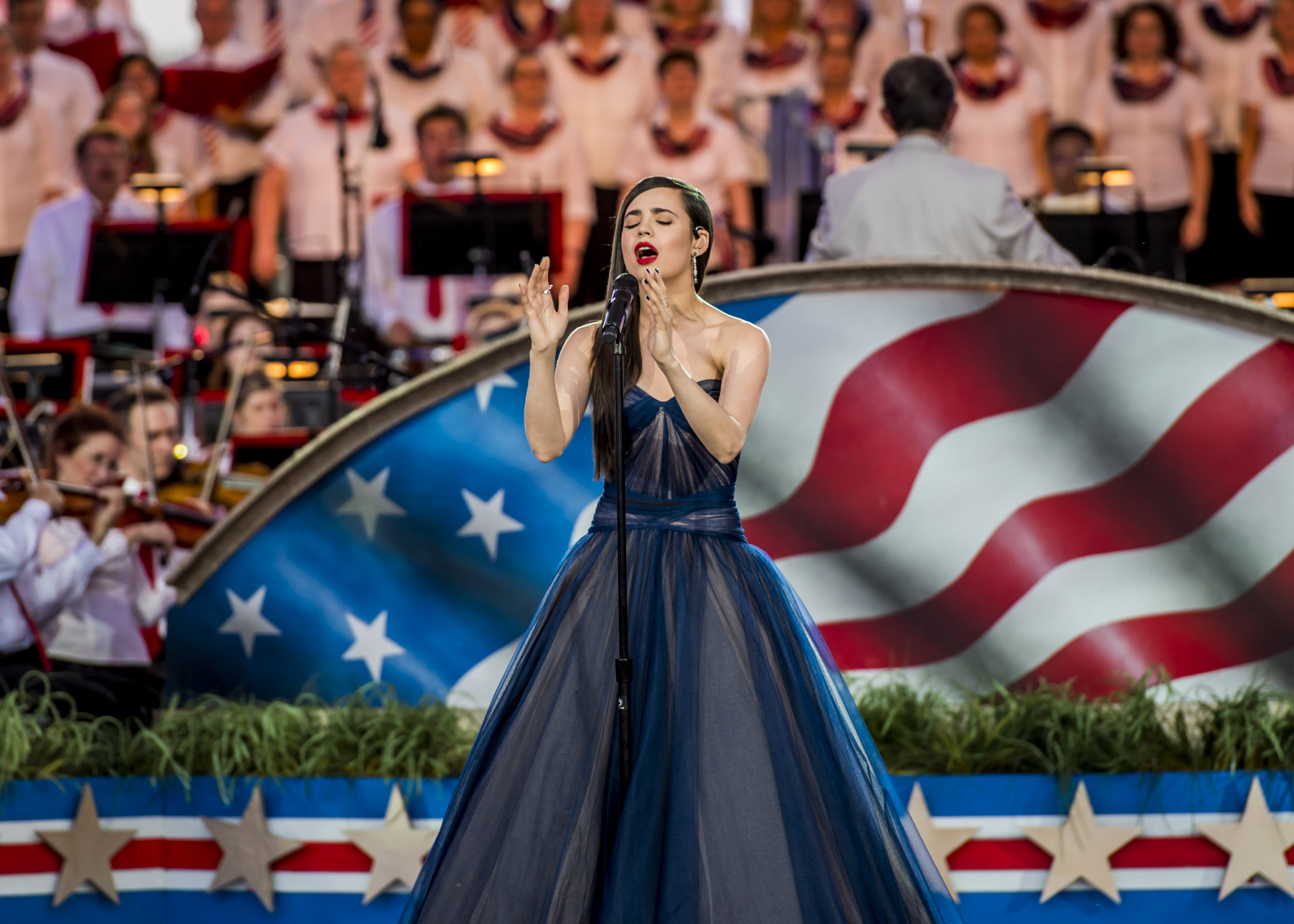
Carson singing the national anthem at the 2017 A Capitol Fourth concert

In an August 2015 interview Carson stated she was working on her first album. In March 2016, Hollywood Records and Republic Records officially announced that Carson had signed a joint worldwide record deal with both companies. Her debut single was "Love Is the Name", an interpolation of Opus' "Live Is Life", and was released on April 8, 2016. "Love is the Name" had an alternate version featuring J. Balvin, and a music video with Carson and Balvin was released for that version. Carson released her second single on August 26, 2016, entitled "I'm Gonna Love You". Carson has performed in NBC's 2015 Thanksgiving Parade, ABC's Disney Parks Christmas Celebration, Univision's Feliz 2016 (New Year's Eve Special), and the 2016 Radio Disney Music Awards, and she was a presenter on ABC's Disneyland 60th Anniversary Special. She performed "The Star-Spangled Banner" accompanied by the National Symphony Orchestra at the 2017 A Capitol Fourth, an annual concert at the United States Capitol in celebration of Independence Day.

On January 27, 2017, she released her single "Back to Beautiful" featuring Alan Walker, and on February 15, 2017, she released the official music video on YouTube. "Back to Beautiful" was written by Julia Michaels, who also wrote Carson's next single, "Ins and Outs". In 2018, Carson was featured on three EDM songs: R3hab's "Rumors", Alan Walker's "Different World" and Galantis's "San Francisco". Following the success of "Rumors", Carson collaborated again with R3hab in her next singles "I Luv U" and "Miss U More Than U Know".

On March 26, 2021, Carson released the single "Fool's Gold", produced by Stargate and Jeff Jones. It reached number 38 on the Mainstream Top 40. The song was remixed by Tiësto; his remix, "Fool's Gold (24 Karat Gold Edition)" was released on April 30, 2021. On May 2, 2021, Carson performed "A Whole New World" (from the 1992 film Aladdin) on American Idol with the show's nine finalists. On September 2, 2021, Carson released "Glowin' Up" as a single as a part of the My Little Pony: A New Generation soundtrack, prior to the film's release on September 24. In March 2022, she released her debut studio album, Sofia Carson. Carson and Diane Warren performed their ballad "Applause" from the film Tell It Like a Woman at the 2023 Academy Awards, where it was nominated for Best Original Song. The performance also featured a string section and a full choir.

=== Television and film ===
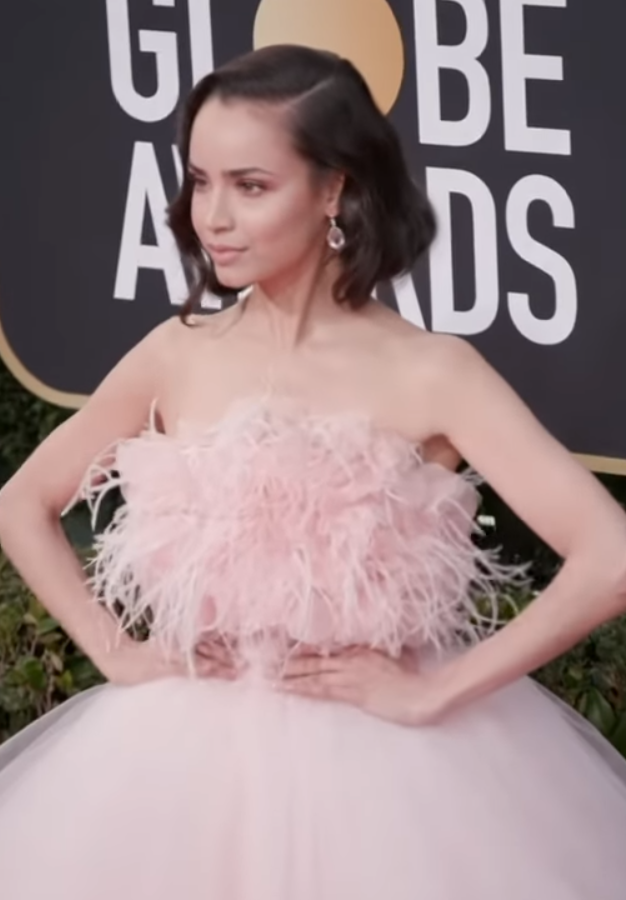
Carson at the Golden Globe Awards in 2020

Carson's acting career launched in 2014 when she guest-starred as Chelsea on the Disney Channel series Austin & Ally. A few months later, Carson was cast as recurring character Soleil on MTV's series Faking It. In 2014, she was cast in a starring role in the Disney Channel Original Movie Descendants, in which she plays Evie, the daughter of the Evil Queen from Snow White.

On January 9, 2015, Carson was cast in the co-lead role in the Disney Channel Original Movie Adventures in Babysitting. Filming began in spring 2015, for an early 2016 television premiere. In March 2016, The Hollywood Reporter announced that Carson landed the leading role in the fourth installment of the A Cinderella Story series, A Cinderella Story: If the Shoe Fits, directed by Michelle Johnston and produced by Dylan Sellers, which was released direct-to-video.

Carson reprised her role as Evie in the 2017 sequel Descendants 2, for which she was nominated for an Imagen Award for Best Supporting Actress. Carson played Sloane Silver in the second season of Freeform's Famous in Love in 2018. In January 2018, it was announced that Carson would be starring in the television series Pretty Little Liars: The Perfectionists, in the role of Ava Jalali; it was picked up to series by Freeform in May 2018 and premiered in March 2019. For her performance, she was nominated for a Teen Choice Award for Choice Drama TV Actress. She once again played Evie for Descendants 3, the third installment of the franchise, which premiered on August 2, 2019. In July 2019, it was announced that Carson would play April in the Netflix dance film Feel the Beat, which was released in 2020.

In 2020, Carson joined the cast of the thriller film Songbird, in which she played the main role of Sara. Later that year, it was announced that she had been cast in the romance film Purple Hearts as Cassie. Carson is also an executive producer for the movie and wrote and performed on the film's soundtrack. Her song "Come Back Home" from the film won Best Musical Moment at the 2023 MTV Movie & TV Awards. She voiced Pipp Petals in My Little Pony: A New Generation, which was released on September 24, 2021. In July 2022, Purple Hearts was released by Netflix, reaching the number-one position worldwide. Carson starred in the Amblin Entertainment film Carry-On alongside Taron Egerton and Jason Bateman. On May 10, 2023, it was announced that Carson would serve as guest mentor on American Idol on its Disney Night themed episode, mentoring the top 5 contestants.

== Other ventures ==
In August 2019, Carson was designated as the first Global Ambassador of the Latin Grammy Cultural Foundation. Her role includes advocating, promoting, and increasing awareness of the foundation's mission and its charitable programs.

In January 2020, Carson was named the new global ambassador of beauty brand Revlon. In June 2020, Revlon released Carson's own collection, the Revlon x Sofia Carson collection, which includes lipsticks and nail polishes. In October 2020, she was named a UNICEF Ambassador. On February 28, 2021, she hosted the Hollywood Foreign Press Association Golden Globes Red Carpet Pre-Show. In April 2021, Revlon released a new fragrance for Carson, called One Heart. In 2022, she partnered with the Latin Grammy Cultural Foundation to announce the Sofia Carson Scholarship, which will fund a bachelor's degree at Berklee College of Music. For her philanthropic efforts, in 2023 she was named Global Advocate of the Year by the United Nations Correspondent Association and received the award from António Guterres, Secretary General of the United Nations.

== Filmography ==
=== Film ===
| Year | Title | Role | Notes | Ref. |
|---|---|---|---|---|
| 2016 | Tini: The Movie | Melanie Sanchez | | |
| 2016 | A Cinderella Story: If the Shoe Fits | Tessa Golding/Bella Snow | Direct-to-video | |
| 2020 | Feel the Beat | April Dibrina | | |
| 2020 | Songbird | Sara Garcia | Direct-to-video | |
| 2021 | My Little Pony: A New Generation | Pipp Petals | Voice role | |
| 2022 | If You Have | Herself | Documentary film | |
| 2022 | Purple Hearts | Cassie | Also executive producer | |
| 2024 | Carry-On | Nora Parisi | | |
| 2025 | The Life List | Alex | | |
| 2025 | My Oxford Year | Anna De La Vega | Also executive producer | |

=== Television ===
| Year | Title | Role | Notes | Ref. |
|---|---|---|---|---|
| 2014 | Austin & Ally | Chelsea | Episode: "Princesses & Prizes" | |
| 2014 | Faking It | Soleil | Episodes: "We Shall Overcompensate", "Faking Up Is Hard to Do" | |
| 2015 | Descendants | Evie | TV movie | |
| 2015–2017 | Descendants: Wicked World | Evie | Main cast; voice role | |
| 2016, 2018 | Soy Luna | Herself | 3 episodes | |
| 2016 | Walk the Prank | Herself | Episode: "Adventures in Babysitting" | |
| 2016 | Adventures in Babysitting | Lola Perez | TV movie | |
| 2017 | Descendants 2 | Evie | TV movie | |
| 2017 | Spider-Man | Keemia Marko / Sandgirl | 2 episodes; voice role | |
| 2018 | Famous in Love | Sloane Silver | Recurring role (season 2) | |
| 2019 | Pretty Little Liars: The Perfectionists | Ava Jalali | Main cast | |
| 2019 | Celebrity Family Feud | Herself | Contestant | |
| 2019 | Descendants 3 | Evie | TV movie | |
| 2020 | Elena of Avalor | Maliga | Episode: "The Birthday Cruise"; voice role | |
| 2020 | The Disney Family Singalong | Herself | Television special | |
| 2020 | Group Chat | Herself | Episode: "Confetti Clean Up" | |
| 2021 | Descendants: The Royal Wedding | Evie | Television special; voice role | |
| 2023 | The Muppets Mayhem | Herself | Episode: "Track 3: Exile on Main Street" | |
| 2023 | American Idol | Herself, guest mentor | Episode: "Disney Night" | |
| 2024 | Andrea Bocelli 30: The Celebration | Herself | Television special | |
| 2025 | Electric Bloom | Herself | Episode: "How We (Sorta) Got Our First Big Break: Part Two" | |

== Discography ==
- Sofia Carson (2022)

== Awards and nominations ==
| Year | Award | Category | Work | Result | Ref. |
|---|---|---|---|---|---|
| 2016 | Premios Juventud | Producers Choice Award | Herself | Nominated | |
| 2016 | Teen Choice Awards | Choice Music: Next Big Thing | Herself | Nominated | |
| 2016 | Young Entertainer Award | Best Young Ensemble Cast | Descendants | Nominated | |
| 2018 | Radio Disney Music Awards | Best Crush Song | "Ins and Outs" | Nominated | |
| 2018 | Imagen Awards | Best Supporting Actress | Descendants 2 | Nominated | |
| 2019 | Teen Choice Awards | Choice Drama TV Actress | Pretty Little Liars: The Perfectionists | Nominated | |
| 2023 | MTV Movie & TV Awards | Best Musical Moment | "Come Back Home" in Purple Hearts | Won | |
| 2023 | Ischia Global Fest | Global Music Award | "Applause" | Won | |
