= Solo (Opus album) =

Studio album by Opus
- Released: September 1985
- Genre: Pop rock
- Length: 38:13
- Label: Polydor
- Producer: Peter Müller

Opus chronology
Live Is Life (1984)	Solo (1985)	Opus (1987)

Singles from Solo
- 1. "Rock on the Rocks" Released: 1985; 2. "Idolater" Released: 1986

Solo is the fifth studio album by the Austrian pop rock band Opus. It was released in September 1985 by Polydor Records and peaked at #8 on the Ö3 Austria Top 40 Longplay. The first single "Rock on the Rocks", peaked at #21 on the Ö3-Hitparade. The second single, "Idolater", peaked at #24 on the Ö3-Hitparade.

== Track listing ==
All tracks are written by Opus members.

No.	Title	Length
1.	"Idolater"	4:25
2.	"Rock on the Rocks"	3:22
3.	"It Takes So Long"	3:25
4.	"No One Is Here"	3:16
5.	"Dreamin' Takes You Away"	3:57
6.	"The Beast in Us"	5:15
7.	"Solo"	5:09
8.	"I Don't Stop Searchin'"	3:49
9.	"The Day of the Dawn"	4:25
10.	"2 A.R."	0:33

== Charts ==
=== Weekly charts ===
Chart (1985)	Peak position
Austrian Albums (Ö3 Austria)	8
