= Eyeball Eddie =

2001 American short film

- Theatrical release poster
- Directed by: Elizabeth Allen
- Written by: Nick Pustay
- Produced by: Alexis Kasperavicius; Elizabeth Allen
- Starring: Martin Starr; Melissa Hunter; Michael Rosenbaum; M. Emmet Walsh
- Cinematography: Matthew Jensen
- Edited by: Brett Hedlund; Tripp Reed
- Music by: Steve Weisberg
- Release date: 2001
- Running time: 29 minutes
- Country: United States
- Language: English

Eyeball Eddie is a 2001 American short dark comedy film directed by Elizabeth Allen and written by Nick Pustay. The film stars Martin Starr, Melissa Hunter, Michael Rosenbaum, and M. Emmet Walsh. It follows a high school wrestler who gains an advantage in matches by removing his prosthetic eye, shocking his opponents. The film screened at multiple festivals including the Slamdance Film Festival and won audience awards at the Sidewalk Moving Picture Festival and Stony Brook Film Festival.

== Plot ==
Eddie Malick is a 14-year-old high school wrestler who struggles to win matches and is self-conscious about his prosthetic eye. During a bout, the eye is accidentally dislodged, startling his opponent and allowing Eddie to secure an unexpected victory.

Realizing the reaction it provokes, Eddie begins deliberately removing the eye during matches to distract opponents and gain an advantage. His success attracts attention at school, and he becomes a local curiosity, drawing larger crowds to wrestling events. His teammate Skelley, initially dismissive, begins associating with him and takes the prosthetic eye to a party, where it is damaged.

Layla, a school photographer documenting Eddie’s rise, expresses concern that others are exploiting him. After discovering the damage to the eye, Eddie confronts Skelley, leading to a fight that ends with Eddie pinning him. In the struggle, the prosthetic eye is lost and shattered.

Eddie returns to competition without the eye, wearing a patch, and prepares to wrestle on his own terms. The film concludes with Eddie and Layla posing together for a photograph.

== Cast ==
- Martin Starr as Eddie
- Melissa Hunter as Layla
- Michael Rosenbaum as Tom Skelley
- M. Emmet Walsh as Coach Cook

== Production ==
The film was produced at the University of Southern California School of Cinema-Television. It was directed by Elizabeth Allen, a graduate of Cornell University who received the Jack Nicholson Directing Scholarship at USC. The screenplay was written by Nick Pustay. The film was produced by Alexis Kasperavicius and Rosenbaum, with Martin Cohen, then head of post-production at DreamWorks Pictures, and Erica Frauman serving as executive producers. Director Gary Fleder served as a mentor on the project.

The cinematography was by Matthew Jensen who later worked on major film and television productions, and was shot on 35 mm film in the 1:85:1 aspect ratio using Panavision cameras and lenses. The film was edited by Brett Hedlund and Tripp Reed. Special effects for the prosthetic eye were created by Bill Gilman, a fellow Cornell alumnus.

== Release ==
The film premiered at the Slamdance Film Festival in January 2001. In April 2001 it screened at the USC First Look Festival at the DGA Theatre in Los Angeles, sponsored by Marcia Lucas, Eastman Kodak Company, and FotoKem. It subsequently screened at several film festivals, including the Maryland Film Festival, the Los Angeles Film Festival, the Nashville Film Festival, the Oldenburg International Film Festival, the Sidewalk Moving Picture Festival, and the Stony Brook Film Festival. The film was also screened at Moomba in West Hollywood as part of the Short Film Forum series.

== Reception ==
Eyeball Eddie received a review from Film Threat following its Slamdance premiere, with critic Morgan Miller noting M. Emmet Walsh's supporting role as a highlight but finding the film ultimately a "clichéd, predictable dark comedy." The film won the Audience Choice Award for Short Film at the Sidewalk Moving Picture Festival and tied for the Audience Award for Short Film at the Stony Brook Film Festival. It also received an Honorable Mention for Best Short Film at the Nashville Film Festival and won at the Telluride Indie Fest.
