= Live Is Life (album) =

Live album by Opus
- Released: December 1984
- Recorded: 2 September 1984
- Venues: Oberwart Stadium (Oberwart, Austria)
- Genre: Pop rock
- Length: 50:26
- Labels: OK Musica; Polydor
- Producer: Peter Müller

Opus chronology
Up and Down (1984)	Live Is Life (1984)	Solo (1985)

Singles from Live Is Life
- 1. "Live Is Life" Released: 1984; 2. "Flyin' High" Released: 1985

Live Is Life is the first live album by the Austrian pop rock band Opus. It was released in December 1984 by OK Musica for Austria and by Polydor Records for the outside of the country. It includes the title song "Live Is Life", which was a worldwide hit. The album peaked at #1 in Austria.

== Track listing ==
All tracks are written by Opus members.

No.	Title	Length
1.	"Opus Pocus"	3:42
2.	"Positive"	4:28
3.	"No Job"	3:20
4.	"The Opusition"	3:53
5.	"Again and Again"	3:51
6.	"Double Bubbles"	4:26
7.	"Live Is Life"	4:07
8.	"Flyin' High"	4:48
9.	"Follow Me"	4:37
10.	"Eleven"	3:03
11.	"Keep Your Mind"	5:57
12.	"The Last Note"	4:10

== Charts ==
=== Weekly charts ===
Chart (1984–1985)	Peak position
Austrian Albums (Ö3 Austria)	1
German Albums (Offizielle Top 100)	5
Norwegian Albums (VG-lista)	16
Swedish Albums (Sverigetopplistan)	37
Swiss Albums (Schweizer Hitparade)	4

=== Year-end charts ===
Chart (1985)	Position
Austrian Albums (Ö3 Austria)	7
German Albums (Offizielle Top 100)	31
Swiss Albums (Schweizer Hitparade)	5
