= Opus (Opus album) =

Studio album by Opus
- Released: October 1987
- Genre: Pop rock
- Length: 52:10
- Label: Polydor
- Producer: Peter Müller

Opus chronology
Solo (1985)	Opus (1987)	Magical Touch (1990)

Singles from Opus
- 1. "Whiteland" Released: 1987; 2. "Faster and Faster" Released: 1988; 3. "Will You Ever Know Me" Released: 1988

Opus is the sixth studio album by the Austrian pop rock band Opus. It was released in October 1987 by Polydor Records and peaked at #7 on the Ö3 Austria Top 40 Longplay. The first single "Whiteland", peaked at #3 on the Ö3 Austria Top 40 Singles and #2 on the Ö3-Hitparade. The second single, "Faster and Faster", peaked at #12 on the Ö3 Austria Top 40 Singles and #2 on the Ö3-Hitparade. The third single, "Will You Ever Know Me", peaked at #24 on the Ö3-Hitparade.

== Track listing ==
All tracks are written by Opus members.

No.	Title	Length
1.	"Can You Hear Me"	4:37
2.	"Cool Lover"	4:07
3.	"Whiteland"	4:53
4.	"Will You Ever Know Me"	4:19
5.	"On the Surface"	4:48
6.	"Faster and Faster"	4:20
7.	"Givin' a Gift"	4:22
8.	"Shot at the Top"	4:03
9.	"Deep Inside"	3:59
10.	"Gimme a Break"	4:13
11.	"Walking Along with You"	3:28
12.	"Every Now and Then"	5:01

== Charts ==
=== Weekly charts ===
Chart (1987–1988)	Peak position
Austrian Albums (Ö3 Austria)	7
