= Up and Down (Opus album) =

Studio album by Opus
- Released: May 1984
- Genre: Pop rock
- Length: 37:50
- Labels: OK Musica; Polydor
- Producer: Peter Müller

Opus chronology
| Opusition (1983) | Up and Down (1984) | Live Is Life (1984) |

Singles from Up and Down
- 1. "Positive" Released: 1984; 2. "Up and Down" Released: 1984

Up and Down is the fourth studio album by the Austrian pop rock band Opus. It was released in May 1984 by OK Musica for Austria and for the rest of the world by Polydor Records. The version released by Polydor has different tracklist from the original version. In Canada and the United States, the song "Live Is Life" was included, because the live album of the same name wasn't released in these countries. The single "Up and Down" charted at #65 on the Canadian music chart.

== Track listing ==
All tracks are written by Opus members.

| No. | Title | Length |
|---|---|---|
| 1. | "Up and Down" | 3:51 |
| 2. | "Vivian" | 3:52 |
| 3. | "There Is Need for" | 4:11 |
| 4. | "She Loves You" | 2:02 |
| 5. | "The End of the Show" | 4:15 |
| 6. | "Positive" | 4:08 |
| 7. | "Way to Play" | 3:36 |
| 8. | "Dark Side of the Mirror" | 3:45 |
| 9. | "Waiting for a Call From You" | 5:20 |
| 10. | "Small Is Beautiful" | 2:43 |

== Personnel ==
Opus

- Herwig Rüdisser – lead vocals
- Ewald Pfleger – guitar, background vocals
- Kurt-René Plisnier – keyboards
- Peter Niklas Gruber – bass guitar, background vocals
- Günter Grasmuck – drums, percussion

Additional touring personnel

- Günter Timischl – background vocals, percussion

Additional studio musicians

- Karin Raab – additional vocals (tracks 2, 5)
- Christian Kolonovits – synclavier, arrangement (track 4)

== Charts ==
| Chart (1984) | Peak position |
|---|---|
| Austrian Albums (Ö3 Austria Top 40 Longplay) | 12 |
| Canadian Albums (RPM 100 Albums) | 51 |
| US Billboard 200 | 64 |
