= Live Is Life =

1984 single by Opus

Single by Opus

from the album Live Is Life/ Up and Down (U.S. version)
- B-side: "Again and Again"; "Up and Down"
- Released: 1984
- Recorded: 2 September 1984
- Venue: Oberwart Stadium (Oberwart, Austria)
- Genre: Pop rock; AOR
- Length: 4:14
- Label: OK Musica; Polydor
- Composers: Ewald Pfleger; Günter Grasmuck; Herwig Rüdisser; Kurt-René Plisnier; Peter Niklas Gruber
- Lyricist: Ewald Pfleger
- Producer: Peter Müller

Opus singles chronology
"Up and Down" (1984)	"Live Is Life" (1984)	"Flyin' High (Live Version)" (1985)

Music video
- "Live Is Life" on YouTube
Gimme Love (1992)	The Power of Live Is Life (1994)	Live Is Life 08 (2008)

Alternative covers
- Austrian release

"Live Is Life" is a song by Austrian pop rock band Opus, released in 1984 by labels Polydor and OK as the first single from the band's first live album, Live Is Life (1984). It was written by the band and produced by Peter Müller, and also included on the US version of their fourth studio album, Up and Down (1984). The song was a European number-one hit in the summer of 1985, and also reached number one in Canada and the top 40 in the US in 1986. It has been covered by many artists. The title is sometimes mistaken as "Life Is Life". Standard German phonology has final-obstruent devoicing, so that the word "live" sounds like "life".

== Background and chart performance ==
After having released several singles, "Live Is Life" achieved huge success in 1985, topping the charts of many countries, including Austria (eight weeks), West Germany, France (seven weeks) and Sweden (four weeks).

The song was created during a concert in Oberwart, on 2 September 1984, while the group celebrated its eleventh anniversary. It was recorded in a live version with the audience singing along in the verses. In the lyrics, the song expresses "the enthusiastic attachment of the group to the stage". The song was performed during the 1985 charity campaign, "Austria für Afrika".

It was re-recorded as the theme song of the 2024 European Women's Handball Championship in Austria, Hungary and Switzerland to mark the fortieth anniversary of the original song. It was the goal song of Team Canada during the 2025 World Junior Ice Hockey Championships being held in Ottawa, Ontario. The song had been used by Team Canada in the 2023 Gretzky Hlinka Championship and 2024 IIHF U18 World Championship.

On 19 July 2026, "Live Is Life" was played over the stadium PA during a hydration break in the 2026 FIFA World Cup final between Argentina and Spain at MetLife Stadium in East Rutherford, New Jersey. It was also played during France's group stage game against Norway.

== Maradona's warm up ==
On 19 April 1989, during the warming up in Munich before the UEFA Cup semi-final return between Bayern Munich and Napoli, Diego Maradona performed an impromptu keepie uppie exhibition synchronized to the rhythm of "Live Is Life", as the song happened to be playing over the stadium's loudspeakers during warm-ups. Some confusion persists by those who dispute that it took place in Munich. Among others, Jürgen Klinsmann claimed that it happened during the final in Stuttgart:

There were 70,000 people in the stadium and Maradona went on the field. We're on the other side of the field, warming up like Germans: seriously, focused. There's music playing, the song "Live is Life", and to the rhythm of the song Maradona started juggling the ball. So we stopped our warm-up. What's this guy doing? He's juggling off his shoulders. And we couldn't warm up anymore because we had to watch this guy.

Belgian sports anchor Frank Raes, who edited the video and distributed it via YouTube, has asserted that this warm up took place just before the semifinal in Munich. By 2013, Raes' video clip had garnered almost two million views on YouTube. The 25th anniversary of Maradona's warming up was noted internationally, with newspapers commenting on his skills and on the transformative effect he had on Napoli and southern Italy.

== Personnel ==
- Herwig Rüdisser – lead vocals
- Ewald Pfleger – guitar, background vocals
- Peter Niklas Gruber – bass guitar, background vocals
- Kurt-René Plisnier – keyboards, background vocals
- Günter Grasmuck – drums
- Günter Timischl – percussion, background vocals

== Track listings ==
=== 1985 release ===
- 7" single (1984 release)
1. "Live Is Life" – 4:15
2. "Again and Again" – 3:51
- 7" single (1985 release)
1. "Live Is Life" – 4:15
2. "Up and Down" – 3:49

=== 1994 release ===
- CD maxi
1. "The Power of Live Is Life" (Bingoboys radio mix) – 3:58
2. "Live Is Life" (original version) – 5:06
3. "The Power of Live Is Life" (Bingoboys club mix) – 6:33
4. "Live Is Life" (radio version) – 3:16

=== 2008 release ===
- CD single
1. "Live Is Life 08" (reggae version) – 4:17
2. "Live Is Life 08" (rock version) – 3:38
- CD maxi
1. "Live Is Life 08" (reggae version) – 4:17
2. "Live Is Life 08" (rock version) – 3:38
3. "Live Is Life 08" (reggaeton version) – 3:56
4. "Touch the Sky" by Opus – 3:47

=== 2011 version ===
- Digital download
1. Live Is Life (digitally remastered) [single version] – 4:09
2. Live Is Life (opera version) [live version] – 4:57

== Charts ==
=== Weekly charts ===
Chart (1985–1986)	Peak position
Austria (Ö3 Austria Top 40)	1
Belgium (Ultratop 50 Flanders)	2
Canada Retail Singles (The Record)	1
Canada Top Singles (RPM)	7
Finland (Suomen virallinen lista)	2
France (SNEP)	1
Ireland (IRMA)	4
Netherlands (Dutch Top 40)	3
Netherlands (Single Top 100)	3
Norway (VG-lista)	2
South Africa (Springbok Radio)	2
Spain (AFYVE)	1
Sweden (Sverigetopplistan)	1
Switzerland (Schweizer Hitparade)	2
UK Singles (Official Charts)	6
US Billboard Hot 100	32
US Cash Box Top 100	35
West Germany (GfK)	1

Chart (1994)^{1}	Peak position
Austria (Ö3 Austria Top 40)	3
Iceland (Íslenski Listinn Topp 40)	7

Chart (2008)^{2}	Peak position
Austria (Ö3 Austria Top 40)	16
Netherlands (Single Top 100)	60

Chart (2024)	Peak position
Poland (Polish Airplay Top 100)	58

2026 weekly chart performance
Chart (2026)	Peak position
Norway Airplay (IFPI Norge)	90

- ^{1} "The Power of Live Is Life"
- ^{2} "Live Is Life 08", featuring Jerry (in Austria)

=== Year-end charts ===
Chart (1985)	Position
Austria (Ö3 Austria Top 40)	4
Canada Top Singles (RPM)	82
Netherlands (Dutch Top 40)	48
Netherlands (Single Top 100)	47
Switzerland (Schweizer Hitparade)	1
West Germany (Media Control)	1

Chart (1986)	Position
Canada Top Singles (RPM)	78

=== Sales and certifications ===
Region	Certification	Certified units/sales
Canada (Music Canada)	2× Platinum	200,000^{^}
France (SNEP)	Gold	500,000^{*}
Germany (BVMI)	Gold	500,000^{^}
Italy (FIMI)	Gold	35,000^{‡}
Spain (Promusicae)	Gold	25,000^{^}
United Kingdom (BPI)	Silver	250,000^{^}
^{*} Sales figures based on certification alone.^{^} Shipments figures based on certification alone.^{‡} Sales+streaming figures based on certification alone.

== Hermes House Band version ==
"Live Is Life (Here We Go)"

Single by Hermes House Band featuring DJ Ötzi

from the album Today Is the Day
- B-side: "Remix"
- Released: 24 June 2002
- Genre: Europop
- Length: 3:30
- Label: Universal; Polydor
- Songwriters: Ewald Pfleger; Kurt Rene Plisnier; Gunter Grasmuck; Niki Gruber; Herwig Rüdisser
- Producers: Klaus Biedermann; Jim Binapfl; Jake Buck; Mark Duran; John Lehmkuhl; Claus Marcus; Christian Seitz

Hermes House Band singles chronology
"Que sera sera" (2001)	"Live Is Life (Here We Go)" (2002)	"Those Were the Days" (2003)

The Hermes House Band and DJ Ötzi released a version of "Live Is Life" in 2002. The single had its highest peak position in France, where it reached number two for five weeks. The song was used as a soundtrack for the German youth film Das Jahr der ersten Küsse. As of August 2014, the song was the 23rd best-selling single of the 21st century in France, with 537,000 units sold.

=== Track listings ===
- CD single
1. "Live Is Life (Here We Go)" (Here We Go/video mix) – 3:30
2. "Live Is Life (Here We Go)" (jump mix) – 3:33
- CD maxi
1. "Live Is Life (Here We Go)" (Here We Go/video mix) – 3:30
2. "Live Is Life (Here We Go)" (jump mix) – 3:33
3. "Football's Coming Home" (three lions) (radio) by Hermes House Band – 3:48
4. "Everytime You Touch Me" (fireplace mix) by Hermes House Band – 3:21
5. "Hey Mama" by Hermes House Band – 3:10
6. Enhanced Multimediatrack : "Live Is Life" – 3:30

=== Charts ===
==== Weekly charts ====
Chart (2002–2003)	Peak position
Australia (ARIA)	28
Austria (Ö3 Austria Top 40)	16
Belgium (Ultratop 50 Flanders)	30
Belgium (Ultratop 50 Wallonia)	5
Denmark (Tracklisten)	11
Europe (Eurochart Hot 100)	9
France (SNEP)	2
Germany (GfK)	15
Ireland (IRMA)	30
Netherlands (Single Top 100)	61
Romania (Romanian Top 100)	55
Sweden (Sverigetopplistan)	46
Switzerland (Schweizer Hitparade)	26
UK Singles (Official Charts)	50

==== Year-end charts ====
Chart (2003)	Position
Belgium (Ultratop 50 Wallonia)	27
France (SNEP)	7

=== Sales and certifications ===
Region	Certification	Certified units/sales
Belgium (BRMA)	Gold	25,000^{*}
France (SNEP)	Platinum	500,000^{*}
^{*} Sales figures based on certification alone.

== Other cover versions ==
The Slovenian art collective Laibach recorded two retitled versions of the song for their 1987 album Opus Dei, one in English which was used as the album's title track, and the other in German under the name "Leben heisst Leben", with guitar solo included. Both were arranged in a distinctly darker and militaristic style typical of the group's music. The song, along with their cover of Queen's "One Vision" on the same LP, gained the band mainstream airplay on outlets including MTV and The Chart Show.

The song was covered by Stargo, whose version reached number 10 in France in 1985. Sofia Carson's "Love Is the Name" features an interpolation of "Live Is Life". The song was also adapted by Liverpool fans as a football chant about their then manager Jürgen Klopp early in his tenure at the club. The song was reused by Liverpool fans and Klopp himself for a chant about Klopp's successor Arne Slot.

== See also ==
- List of number-one hits of 1985 (Germany)
- List of number-one singles of 1985 (France)
- List of number-one singles of 1985 (Spain)
- List of number-one singles and albums in Sweden
