= Purple Hearts (2022 film) =

American romantic drama film by Elizabeth Allen Rosenbaum

- Release poster
- Directed by: Elizabeth Allen Rosenbaum
- Written by: Liz W. Garcia; Kyle Jarrow
- Based on: Purple Hearts by Tess Wakefield
- Produced by: Amy Baer; Elysa Koplovitz Dutton; Leslie Morgenstein
- Starring: Sofia Carson; Nicholas Galitzine; Chosen Jacobs; John Harlan Kim; Kat Cunning; Linden Ashby
- Cinematography: Matt Sakatani Roe
- Edited by: Ishai Setton
- Music by: Tony Kanal; Blake Neely
- Production companies: Netflix; Alloy Entertainment; Embankment Films
- Distributed by: Netflix
- Release date: July 29, 2022
- Running time: 122 minutes
- Country: United States
- Language: English
- Budget: $2.8 million

Purple Hearts is a 2022 American romantic drama film created for Netflix and directed by Elizabeth Allen Rosenbaum. It is based upon the novel of the same name by Tess Wakefield. It stars Sofia Carson and Nicholas Galitzine.

The film was released on Netflix on July 29, 2022. It received generally negative reviews from critics.

== Plot ==
Cassie Salazar is a waitress/bartender who performs with her band, The Loyal, at a bar in Oceanside, California. Diagnosed with type 1 diabetes six months earlier, she struggles to afford insulin, working multiple jobs to survive.

One night, Cassie serves a group of Marines about to be deployed to Iraq. One of them, Luke Morrow, flirts with her, but she rejects his advances. He has his own problems: he became an addict after his mom's death, and although two years clean, he still owes $15,000 to his dealer, Johnno. Estranged from his retired Marine dad, Luke asks his brother for help, but is declined.

Cassie asks Frankie, a childhood friend and Luke's bunkmate, to marry her for the health insurance benefits granted to military spouses, but he already has plans to marry his sweetheart Riley. Luke overhears, and although he initially advises against a fraudulent marriage, he realizes they could both benefit financially; Luke would earn more money and Cassie would have healthcare. They agree to marry immediately, and after a year file for divorce.

Frankie, the wedding witness, gives Cassie the ring he will marry Riley with, asking her to keep it safe. After, the newlyweds join their fellow Marines at a bar. Cassie argues with one over "hunting down Arabs", causing an argument with Luke, but they pretend to make amends. That night, he admits he is scared of both the marriage and Iraq. Cassie comforts him and they sleep together.

The next morning, the Marines are deployed. Before getting on the bus to leave, Luke gives Cassie his brother's contact information, as he is his next of kin. The two start sending emails and video calls to one another to keep up the ruse and grow close. Cassie performs an original song, "Come Back Home," for the Marines, uplifting their spirits after a rough day.

The song goes viral, and Cassie admits Luke might be her muse. Later, she learns that he has been severely injured by an IED explosion and is returning to recover. Cassie accidentally contacts Luke's father instead of his brother, angering Luke, as the retired MP would report them if he knew.

Frankie was killed in action so, at his funeral, Cassie gives Riley the ring. Luke moves into Cassie's apartment after his hospital discharge. He makes a wedding ring out of his dog tag chain for Cassie and they re-decorate her apartment to showcase their marriage for his father, who takes him to physical therapy.

Cassie adopts golden retriever Peaches, to aid in Luke's recovery. His rehab and their cohabitation inspire Cassie's "I Hate the Way," which she performs at the Whisky a Go Go. It captures the attention of record companies.

Still seeking his money, Johnno breaks into Cassie's mother's house to antagonise Luke. That night, Cassie goes into hypoglycemic shock as her sugar level drops. Luke helps her recover and they kiss. The next day, Luke beats Johnno up, pays him off and demanding he stay away. Instead, Johnno informs Cassie's mother about Luke's past.

When Cassie confronts Luke, he confesses he had stolen his father's car to sell but crashed it, so he borrowed money from Johnno to pay his dad back. She demands a divorce and that he leave her apartment by the next day. When Luke returns home from a run, the MPs detain him, as Johnno reported their fraudulent marriage. Luke's father calls Cassie about the charges and the impending court-martial.

Luke pleads guilty, taking full responsibility and insisting Cassie was unaware she violated U.S. military law to shield her from criminal charges. He is sentenced to six months in the brig after which he will receive a Bad Conduct Discharge.

Cassie's band is signed to a label and are opening for Florence and the Machine at the Hollywood Bowl. She sings her newest Luke-inspired song, "I Didn't Know," which she wrote while awaiting Luke's trial. Then she rushes to confess her love for Luke before he is imprisoned. He gives her his wedding ring and tells her "It's real now."

As the credits roll, six months later, Luke is released from prison. Luke and Cassie are a happily married couple at the beach, where they are enjoying a picnic with Peaches.

== Cast ==
- Sofia Carson as Cassie Salazar
- Nicholas Galitzine as Luke Morrow
- Chosen Jacobs as Frankie
- John Harlan Kim as Toby
- Kat Cunning as Nora
- Linden Ashby as Jacob Morrow Sr.

== Production ==
=== Casting ===
In November 2020, an announcement was made that Carson was set to star in Purple Hearts as the female lead for the film. In the announcement it stated that she would also be an executive producer, and write and sing the original songs for the soundtrack. In that same month it was revealed that Charles Melton had been cast as the male lead, but right before production started in August 2021, Galitzine was reported to be taking over the role.

In September 2021, Deadline reported that Chosen Jacobs, John Harlan Kim, Anthony Ippolito, Kat Cunning, Sarah Rich, Scott Deckert and Linden Ashby would round out the cast for the film. In the same report it was announced that Grammy nominee Justin Tranter would write and produce the original songs, with Carson co-writing and performing additional music.

=== Filming ===
The principal photography for the Netflix original commenced in August 2021 and finished in October of the same year. Filming took place in Los Angeles County, San Diego County, Riverside, and Austin, Texas.

The director, Allen Rosenbaum, worked with military adviser and Navy Veteran James Dever to get the Netflix project to film on base at Camp Pendleton. The first proposition was rejected, however, after Dever added his touch to the script, permission was granted to film. Deadline Hollywood described the film's budget as "thrifty."

== Music ==
Grammy Award-nominated singer/songwriter Justin Tranter wrote and produced the original songs for the Netflix original film. Carson also co-wrote and performed additional music for the project. On July 12, 2022, Hollywood Records released "Come Back Home" to help promote the film. Upon the Netflix release, the official soundtrack for the film was made available digitally. The tracklist consist of eight songs, all performed by Carson and includes four original songs co-written by Carson. On August 3, 2022, Sofia Carson released the official music video for "Come Back Home".

== Reception ==
=== Viewership ===
After spending one day on Netflix the film took the number one spot on the daily popularity charts, replacing The Gray Man from its eight-day run in USA. Within the first week of release, Netflix's Global Top 10 revealed that the film had 48.23 million hours watched. In its second week, the film had a total of 102.59 million hours viewed, which was as many hours as the next five films combined. By September, the film had logged 228.6 million hours watched. In December 2022, Netflix announced the movie was the 3rd most watched movie of 2022 spending 6 weeks in the top 10s picking up 240.48 hours between July 24, 2022, and September 4, 2022.

=== Critical response ===
On the review aggregator website Rotten Tomatoes, 32% of 25 critics' reviews are positive, with an average rating of 5.1/10. The website's consensus reads: "Pretty stars aren't enough to make up for Purple Hearts' stereotype-riddled script and misguided approach to serious themes." On Metacritic, the film has a weighted average score of 30 out of 100, based on six critics, indicating "generally unfavorable" reviews.

Claire Shaffer from The New York Times critiqued the film, stating that the film "had the potential to be a poignant melodrama — or maybe a sharp satire" but "wallows in contrived plots and subplots". The reviewer also criticized the leads. Luke Y. Thompson from The A.V Club was also critical, negatively describing the love scenes that "convey neither heat nor emotional substance", and the songs as "overstuffed". David Ehrlich, reviewing from IndieWire, stated that the film was overwrought and "can't settle down even though its two lead characters give each other something to be sure about for the first time in their lives". Some critics were angered that the movie portrayed the American military in a largely positive light and some were offended by the use of controversial language, which Allen later clarified was a part of the character development.

== Future ==
In August 2022, Rosenbaum stated that "they've been casually chatting about doing more, but nothing is official". Carson added that she would love to see a sequel but "who knows. You never know!"

== Awards and nominations ==
Won Best Musical Moment at MTV Movie & TV Awards
