= Come Back Home (Sofia Carson song) =

Single by Sofia Carson

from the album Purple Hearts
- Released: July 12, 2022
- Length: 2:56
- Label: Hollywood
- Songwriters: Sofia Carson; Daniel Crean; Eren Cannata; Skyler Stonestreet; Justin Tranter
- Producers: Eren Cannata; Dan Crean

Sofia Carson singles chronology
"It's Only Love, Nobody Dies" (2022)	"Come Back Home" (2022)	"Applause" (2022)

Music video
- "Come Back Home" on YouTube

"Come Back Home" is a song by American actress and singer Sofia Carson. It was released through Hollywood Records on July 12, 2022, as the lead single from the soundtrack to the 2022 Netflix film Purple Hearts. It was written by Carson, Daniel Crean, Eren Cannata, Skyler Stonestreet and Justin Tranter.

== Background ==
While writing "Come Back Home," Carson told Billboard that they created two different versions but chose the one used in the film. "And once we did, we just fell in love with it. We knew that it was our song." It just really captured the soul, the tenderness of this moment, the vulnerability at this moment — and truly the heart of our story." There are two different versions on the soundtrack, the other being a stripped-down version of the song.

== Music videos ==
There are two music videos for "Come Back Home", both of which are featured on the soundtrack. The first was released on August 3, 2022. It shows Carson at her piano on a beach with a few clips from the film being shown. She told Entertainment Weekly, "we wanted to make it that much more special by, instead of it being a classic music video, it's a performance video," Carson explains. "So, it's me performing 'Come Back Home' on the piano and it's actually set at the same beach that Luke and I end the movie on, which makes it that much more beautiful and true to our story.

The second version of the music video shows the full performance for the song that was shown in the film while performing live in Oceanside, CA outside the gates of Camp Pendleton. It also features clips from the film throughout the video.

== Charts ==
=== Weekly charts ===
Chart performance for "Come Back Home"
Chart (2022)	Peak position
Australia Hitseekers (ARIA)	7
Austria (Ö3 Austria Top 40)	45
Canada Hot 100 (Billboard)	80
Czech Republic Singles Digital (ČNS IFPI)	19
France (SNEP)	48
Germany (GfK)	76
Global 200 (Billboard)	75
Hungary (Single Top 40)	5
Ireland (IRMA)	79
Netherlands (Single Tip)	19
New Zealand Hot Singles (RMNZ)	18
Portugal (AFP)	98
Slovakia (Singles Digitál Top 100)	30
South Africa Streaming (TOSAC)	55
Switzerland (Schweizer Hitparade)	28
UK Singles (OCC)	71
US Bubbling Under Hot 100 (Billboard)	17

=== Year-end charts ===
2022 year-end chart performance for "Come Back Home"
Chart (2022)	Position
Hungary (Single Top 40)	77

== Certifications ==
Certifications for "Come Back Home"
Region	Certification	Certified units/sales
Brazil (Pro-Música Brasil)	Platinum	40,000^{‡}
Canada (Music Canada)	Gold	40,000^{‡}
France (SNEP)	Diamond	333,333^{‡}
Poland (ZPAV)	Platinum	50,000^{‡}
^{‡} Sales+streaming figures based on certification alone.
