= Opus (Austrian band) =

Austrian pop rock band (1973–2021)

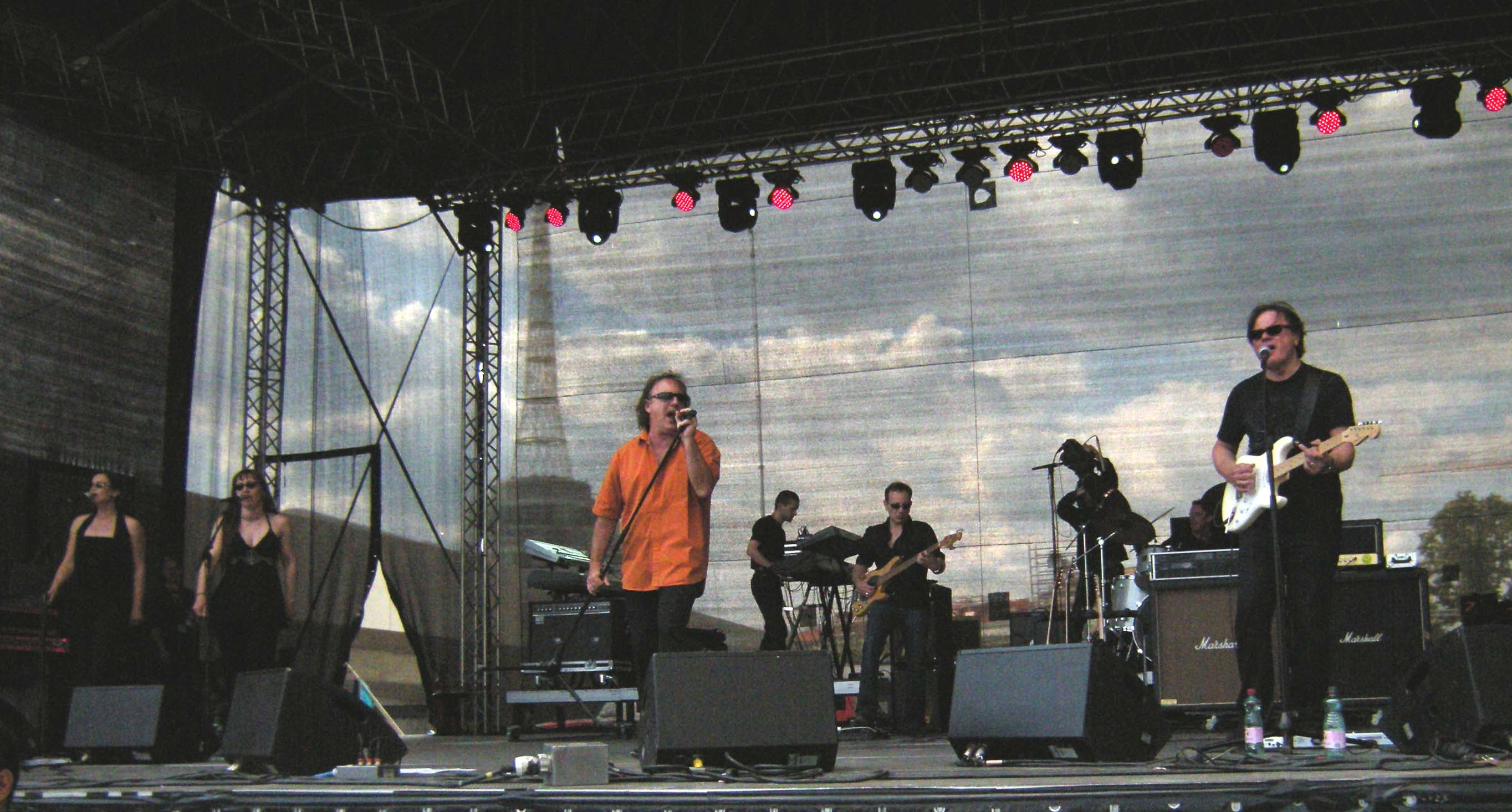
- Opus performing in Vienna in 2008

Background information
- Origin: Graz, Austria
- Genre: Pop rock
- Years active: 1973–2021
- Labels: Philips; OK Musica; RCA Victor; Polydor; Dino Music; BMG; Sony
- Members: Herwig Rüdisser; Ewald Pfleger; Kurt-René Plisnier; Günter Grasmuck
- Past members: Peter Niklas Gruber; Walter Bachkönig; Hans Palier
- Website: opus.at

Opus was an Austrian pop-rock band. It was formed in 1973 in Graz and disbanded in 2021. The band was mainly known for its 1985 single release, "Live Is Life", which reached the Top 10 in several European countries.

== History ==
In 1985, Opus released "Live Is Life", which ranked first in various global charts. This included Canada, which ranked for seven weeks in late 1985 and early 1986. A live recording of the song made the Top 40 in the US in 1986. It ranked sixth in the UK Singles Chart on 3 August 1985, and stayed in the charts for 15 weeks.

Another standout track from Opus was the power ballad "Flyin' High", a live version of which appeared both on the Live is Life album, and a successful US release, Up and Down. At a concert in the mid-1980s, fellow Austrian rock star Falco joined Opus on stage for a rendition of "Flyin' High". On 24 November 2021, Opus performed the song in front of celebrating Austrian government officials during the COVID-19 pandemic. The group disbanded the same year on 21 December.

== In popular culture ==
Cover versions of "Live is Life" have also been performed by Stargo, Laibach, the Hungarian band Tormentor, the Estonian band Kuldne Trio ("Laip on Laip"), Axxis, and Dolapdere Big Gang. Additionally, as a guest, DJ Ötzi released a version with the Hermes House Band in 2002, which reached #50 in the UK chart.

== Band members ==
Final line-up

- Herwig Rüdisser – lead vocals, guitar (1978–2021)
- Ewald Pfleger – guitar, background vocals (1973–2021)
- Kurt-René Plisnier – keyboards (1973–2021)
- Günter Grasmuck – drums, percussion (1974–2021)

Former members

- Peter Niklas Gruber – bass guitar (1980–1991)
- Walter Bachkönig – bass guitar (1973–1980)
- Hans Palier – guitar (1974–1980)

=== Timeline ===
Source:

== Discography ==
=== Albums ===
==== Studio albums ====
List of studio albums, with selected chart positions
Title	Details	Peak chart positions		
Title	Details	AUT	CAN	US
Daydreams	Released: 1980; Label: Philips	—	—	—
Eleven	Released: March 1982; Label: RCA, OK Musica	6	—	—
Opusition	Released: January 1983; Label: OK Musica	16	—	—
Up and Down	Released: May 1984; Label: Polydor, OK Musica	12	51	64
Solo	Released: September 1985; Label: Polydor	8	—	—
Opus	Released: October 1987; Label: Polydor	7	—	—
Magical Touch	Released: March 1990; Label: Polydor	26	—	—
Walkin' on Air	Released: May 1992; Label: Dino Music	13	—	—
Love, God & Radio	Released: 1996; Label: Dino Music, BMG	—	—	—
The Beat Goes On	Released: 2004; Label: Home Base, Spectre	—	—	—
Magnum	Released: 11 November 2020; Label: Self-released	37	—	—
We Are One (with Schick Sisters)	Released: 21 September 2023; Label: Self-released	—	—	—
"—" denotes a recording that did not chart or was not released in that territory.

==== Live albums ====
List of live albums, with selected chart positions
Title	Details	Peak chart positions				
Title	Details	AUT	GER	NOR	SWE	SWI
Live Is Life	Released: December 1984; Label: Polydor, OK Musica	1	5	16	37	4
Jubileé	Released: 1993; Label: Dino Music	—	—	—	—	—
Tonight At the Opera	Released: 16 April 2010; Label: Self-released	—	—	—	—	—
Opus & Friends – Graz Liebenau 1985	Released: 15 November 2013; Label: Self-released	18	—	—	—	—
The Last Note	Released: 25 March 2022; Label: Self-released	6	—	—	—	—
"—" denotes a recording that did not chart or was not released in that territory.

==== Compilation albums ====
- Best of (1985)
- Glanzlichter (1989)
- Best of (1994)
- Die Größten Hits aus 15 Jahren (1997)
- Greatest Hits – The Power of Live Is Life (1998)
- Master Series (1998)
- Flying Higher Greatest Hits (1999)
- Millennium Edition (2000)
- Live Is Life (2002)
- Back to Future – The Ultimate Best of (2008)

=== Extended plays ===
List of extended plays, with selected chart positions
Title	Details	Peak chart positions
Title	Details	AUT
Live Is Life '08	Released: 9 May 2008; Label: Sony, BMG	16

=== Singles ===
List of singles, with selected chart positions and certifications, showing year released and album name
Title	Year	Peak chart positions					Certifications	Album
Title	Year	AUT	GER	SWI	UK	US	Certifications	Album
"Eleven" / "Keep Your Mind"	1982	—	—	—	—	—		Eleven
"Flyin' High" / "Opus Pocus"	1982	5	45	—	—	—		Eleven
"Best Thing" / "Follow Me"	1982	—	—	—	—	—		Opusition
"The Opusition" / "Again and Again"	1983	—	—	—	—	—		Opusition
"Angie"	1983	—	—	—	—	—		Opusition
"Positive"	1984	—	—	—	—	—		Up and Down
"Up and Down"	1984	—	—	—	—	—		Up and Down
"Live Is Life"	1984	1	1	2	6	32	GER: Gold; UK: Silver	Live Is Life
"Warum?"	1985	1	—	—	—	—		Non-album single
"Flyin' High" (Original Live Version)	1985	—	37	5	—	—		Live Is Life
"Rock on the Rocks"	1985	—	—	—	—	—		Solo
"Idolater"	1986	—	—	—	—	—		Solo
"Whiteland"	1987	3	—	—	—	—		Opus
"Faster and Faster"	1988	12	—	—	—	—		Opus
"Will You Ever Know Me"	1988	—	—	—	—	—		Opus
"When the Night Comes"	1990	—	—	—	—	—		Magical Touch
"A Night in Vienna"	1990	—	—	—	—	—		Magical Touch
"Gimme Love"	1992	13	—	—	—	—		Walkin' on Air
"Walkin' on Air"	1992	—	—	—	—	—		Walkin' on Air
"The Power of Live Is Life"	1994	3	—	—	—	—		Greatest Hits – The Power of Live is Life
"Just for Fun"	1996	—	—	—	—	—		Love, God & Radio
"When I Met You"	1996	—	—	—	—	—		Love, God & Radio
"Hands in the Air"	1997	—	—	—	—	—		Love, God & Radio
"Viva Austria"	1998	—	—	—	—	—		Non-album single
"The Beat Goes On"	2004	—	—	—	—	—		The Beat Goes On
"Eternal Dance"	2004	—	—	—	—	—		The Beat Goes On
"You Can Count on Me"	2010	—	—	—	—	—		Non-album singles
"Live Is Life" (2011 re-release)	2011	—	—	—	—	—		Non-album singles
"Funtastic"	2014	—	—	—	—	—		Non-album singles
"Halfway Done"	2019	—	—	—	—	—		Magnum
"Made My Day"	2020	—	—	—	—	—		Magnum
"Fake or True"	2021	—	—	—	—	—		Magnum
"We Made It"	2021	—	—	—	—	—		Magnum
"Good or Bad"	2022	—	—	—	—	—		We Are One
"So Simple"	2023	—	—	—	—	—		We Are One
"—" denotes a single that did not chart or was not released in that territory.

==== Promotional singles ====
- "My Style" (1980)
- "Can You Hear Me" (1987)
- "Hold On" (2008)

== See also ==
- List of Austrians in music
