= Descendants: The Rise of Red (soundtrack) =

Soundtrack album by Descendants cast
- Released: July 12, 2024
- Recorded: January 2023
- Genre: Pop
- Length: 36:02
- Label: Walt Disney

Singles from Descendants: The Rise of Red
- 1. "What's My Name (Red Version)" Released: April 26, 2024; 2. "Red" Released: June 21, 2024

Descendants: The Rise of Red is a soundtrack album by the cast of the film of the same name, released on July 12, 2024, by Walt Disney Records. The soundtrack was announced on April 26, 2024, with the release of the lead single, "What's My Name (Red Version)." Another single, "Red," was released on June 21, 2024.

== Background ==
The soundtrack was released on July 12, 2024, to accompany the release of its parent film. The soundtrack consists of 13 songs, with 10 of them originating from the film. It also includes a rendition of "So This Is Love" from the 1950 animated film, Cinderella, a remix of "What's My Name" from Descendants 2, and a cover of Joan Jett's song, "Bad Reputation."

== Singles ==
"What's My Name (Red Version)", performed by China Anne McClain and Kylie Cantrall was released as a single on April 26, 2024, along with the pre-order of the soundtrack. "Red," performed by Kylie Cantrall and Alex Boniello, was released as the second single on June 21, 2024.

== Track listing ==
Descendants: The Rise of Red (Original Soundtrack) track listing
No.	Title	Writer(s)	Performer(s)	Length
1.	"Red"	Antonina Armato; Tom Sturges; Adam Schmalholz; Tim James Price	Kylie Cantrall; Alex Boniello	3:08
2.	"So This Is Love"	Al Hoffman; Jerry Livingston; Mack David	Brandy; Paolo Montalban	1:13
3.	"Love Ain't It"	Armato; Sturges; Schmalholz; Price	Rita Ora; Cantrall; Brandy; Malia Baker	4:23
4.	"What's My Name" (Red Version)	Armato; Schmalholz; Sturges	China Anne McClain; Cantrall	2:26
5.	"Fight of Our Lives"	Armato; Sturges; Schmalholz; Price	Cantrall; Baker	3:12
6.	"Life Is Sweeter"	Josh Cumbee; Jordan Powers	Cast of Descendants: The Rise of Red	3:38
7.	"Perfect Revenge"	Jason Mater; Bekah Novi; Powers	Dara Reneé; Anthony Pyatt; Joshua Colley; Mars; Peder Lindell	3:14
8.	"Shuffle of Love"	Will Jay; Brandon C. Rogers; Mater	Ruby Rose Turner	2:44
9.	"Get Your Hands Dirty"	Mitch Allan; Chantry Johnson; Michelle Zarlenga	Baker; Morgan Dudley	2:41
10.	"Life Is Sweeter" (Reprise)	Cumbee; Powers	Ora; Cantrall	0:48
11.	"Life Is Sweeter" (Remix)	Cumbee; Powers	Cast of Descendants: The Rise of Red	0:58
12.	"Bad Reputation"	Joan Jett; Ritchie Cordell; Marty Kupersmith; Kenny Laguna	Cantrall	2:09
13.	"Descendants: The Rise of Red Score Suite"	Torin Borrowdale	Torin Borrowdale	5:21

== Reception ==
Jerrica Tisdale of CinemaBlend said that while Disney movies typically emphasize the importance of goodness and doing what is right, the song “Get Your Hands Dirty” introduces a more nuanced view of morality. Tisdale applauded The Rise of Red for adding complexity to its portrayal of right and wrong in a children’s film. Tisdale also stated that “Love Ain’t It” is akin to Descendants’ version of “Bohemian Rhapsody,” noting that while it may not reach the iconic status of the latter, it is an epic, multilayered song with distinct sections, a catchy chorus, and strong vocals, particularly from Rita Ora. They considered it an ideal track to highlight the complex relationship between Red and the Queen of Hearts.

== Commercial performance ==
Descendants: The Rise of Red initially debuted at number 87 on the Billboard 200 before reaching number 60. It reached number one on the Billboard Soundtracks Chart and Billboard Kid Albums Chart. It also debuted at number one on iTunes Charts following its release. In July 2024, the soundtrack for The Descendants: The Rise of Red had accumulated over 26 million streams across various platforms.

The single "Red" debuted at number 13 on the Billboard Bubbling Under Hot 100. On the UK Official Video Streaming Chart, the music videos for "Red" reached number 42, "Life is Sweeter" reached number 26, and "Love Ain't It" reached number 77. As of August 2024, the song “Red” has received over 46 million streams across official channels and 1 billion engagements, with 31 million views on YouTube and 5 million in its first weekend, while the “Life Is Sweeter” and “What’s My Name” videos have received over 23 million and 16 million views respectively.

=== Impact ===
The track "Red" gained significant popularity on social media, generating numerous fan choreography covers and dance challenges on platforms like TikTok and Instagram.

== Live performances ==
Kylie Cantrall performed "Red" live at Nerd Nite during Vidcon in Anaheim on June 28. 2024. On August 9, 2024, during the Disney Entertainment Showcase at the D23 Expo, Descendants: The Rise of Red star Rita Ora presented a musical medley of songs from the film. Kylie Cantrall, Malia Baker, Dara Reneé, Ruby Rose Turner, Morgan Dudley, Joshua Colley, and Peder Lindell performed on stage several songs in costume during the event. On the same day, Disney announced that Kylie Cantrall, Malia Baker, Dara Reneé, Ruby Rose Turner, Freya Skye, and Malachi Barton would go on a Descendants and Zombies: Worlds Collide tour in summer 2025.

== Charts ==
=== Weekly charts ===
Chart performance for Descendants: The Rise of Red
Chart (2024)	Peak position
Belgian Albums (Ultratop Flanders)	120
UK Compilation Albums (Official Charts)	2
UK Album Downloads (OCC)	21
US Billboard 200	60
US Kid Albums (Billboard)	1
US Top Soundtracks (Billboard)	1

=== Year-end charts ===
2024 year-end chart performance for Descendants: The Rise of Red
Chart (2024)	Peak position
US Kid Albums (Billboard)	21
US Top Soundtracks (Billboard)	24
