= Red (Descendants song) =

Promotional single by Kylie Cantrall and Alex Boniello

from the album Descendants: The Rise of Red
- Released: June 21, 2024
- Genre: Pop; glam metal
- Length: 3:09
- Label: Walt Disney
- Songwriters: Antonina Armato, Thomas Sturges, Adam Schmalhoz and Tim James
- Producers: Armato; James

Kylie Cantrall singles chronology
"Unsure" (2024)	"Red" (2024)	"Boy for a Day" (2024)

Descendants singles chronology
"What's My Name (Red Version)" (2024)	"Red" (2024)	"Perfect Princess" (2026)

"Red" is a song performed by Kylie Cantrall and Alex Boniello from Descendants: The Rise of Red and its soundtrack. The song was released on June 21, 2024, by Walt Disney Records.

== Commercial performance ==
The song "Red" debuted at number 13 on the Billboard Bubbling Under Hot 100. On the UK Official Video Streaming Chart, the music videos for "Red" reached number 42. As of August 2024, the song has received over 46 million streams across official channels and 1 billion engagements, with 31 million views on YouTube and 5 million in its first weekend.

== Music video ==
The music video was released on Disney Music's Vevo channel on June 21, 2024.

== Live performances ==
Kylie Cantrall performed "Red" live at Nerd Nite during Vidcon in Anaheim on June 28. 2024. On July 24, 2024, Cantrall performed the song at the Dunkin' Music Lounge. On July 25, 2024, an exclusive live performance of the song was released on Disney Music's Vevo channel. On August 9, 2024, Cantrall performed the song at the D23 Expo. On September 14, 2024, Cantrall performed the song at the L'ATTITUDE event in San Diego.
