= Antonina Armato =

American songwriter

- Occupations: Songwriter, record producer, music producer, businesswoman
- Years active: 1983–present
- Known for: Rock Mafia

Antonina Armato is an American songwriter, record producer, music producer and businesswoman. She is the co-founder and member of Rock Mafia, a record production/songwriting team. She has worked with Justin Bieber, Zedd, Gwen Stefani, Demi Lovato, Christina Aguilera, Vanessa Hudgens, Miley Cyrus, Selena Gomez, No Doubt, Wyclef Jean, Green Day, Sheena Easton, Mariah Carey, Ariana Grande, Flo Rida, Ellie Goulding, Tokio Hotel, AGNEZ MO, Jojo Siwa, and BTS. She has produced and written songs for the soundtracks of the films Descendants 3 and Descendants: The Rise of Red.

== Career ==
=== 1980s–1990s ===
Armato got her first large-scale exposure in the music industry when a song she co-wrote, "Don't Tell Me Tonight" became the lead-off single from Helen Reddy's 1983 album, Imagination.

One of Armato's first major hits was "I Still Believe", which reached number 13 on the Billboard Hot 100 for Brenda K. Starr after being featured on her self-titled album. The track was later covered by Mariah Carey. Armato wrote the song about her first love, later recalling that she "felt every word of it".

She co-wrote the 1990 Billboard Hot 100 number one single, "She Ain't Worth It", by Glenn Medeiros and Bobby Brown, and also wrote or co-wrote the majority of the other tracks on Medeiros' self titled album, released that year. Armato also co- wrote the 1991 top 20 single "What Comes Naturally" for singer Sheena Easton along with other songs for Easton's 1995 album My Cherie and 1997 album Freedom.

In 1999, Armato described spending more and more time in the studio helping young artists develop their talents, describing the studio as a "second home". An executive from EMI described her career trajectory as going "from lyricist to songwriter to producer."

=== 2000s–2010s ===
Armato has also written songs with the Jonas Brothers. She wrote the Top 40 radio hit "Come Back To Me" for singer Vanessa Hudgens. She also wrote and produced the top 5 single, "Love You like a Love Song" for Selena Gomez. She co-wrote and produced Miley Cyrus's Top 10 singles "See You Again" and "7 Things" and her single "Fly on the Wall". She co-wrote the song "Potential Breakup Song" with pop duo Aly & AJ, which peaked at number 17 on Billboard's Hot 100 in 2007 and gained renewed attention after going viral on TikTok in 2020.

Armato co-wrote "Bet On It" from High School Musical 2, and several songs from Miley Cyrus' debut double album Hannah Montana 2: Meet Miley Cyrus, including "Bigger than Us", "See You Again", "East Northumberland High", "Let's Dance", "Right Here", "Clear", and "Good and Broken".

Armato has worked with Adam Lambert and the Beach Girl5 (known as BG5). Rock Mafia wrote and produced Miley Cyrus first single, "Can't Be Tamed" which went top 10 on Billboard and No. 1 on iTunes. She wrote and produced six additional tracks on Cyrus's album Breakout. She produced Bonnie McKee's debut album Trouble along with Rob Cavallo.

Armato co-wrote and produced the platinum song "Naturally" from Kiss & Tell, Selena Gomez & the Scene's debut album. Between 2011 and 2012 Rock Mafia wrote and produced different songs for the soundtrack of the television series Shake It Up, among which are "Not Too Young", "Twist My Hips" and "The Star I R". In 2015, Armato co-wrote and produced several songs on Gomez's second solo album Revival. That same year Armato co-wrote and produced "Beautiful Now" and "True Colors" by Zedd.

=== 2020s ===
For the 2024 film Descendants: The Rise of Red, Armato produced its soundtrack album together with Tim James and wrote some of its tracks, including the singles "Red" and a new version of "What's My Name" performed by China Anne McClain and Kylie Cantrall.
