= Alex Boniello =

American actor

- Born: October 5, 1990 (age 36); Wood-Ridge, New Jersey, U.S.
- Education: Wagner College
- Occupations: Actor, singer, producer
- Years active: 2012–present

Alex Boniello (born October 5, 1990) is an American actor, musician, author, and producer best known for his portrayal of the voice of Moritz in the 2015 Broadway revival of Spring Awakening and his performance as Connor Murphy in the Broadway production of Dear Evan Hansen. In 2019, he won the Tony Award for Best Musical as a producer for Hadestown.

== Career ==
Boniello grew up in Wood-Ridge, New Jersey and attended Wood-Ridge High School, where he began acting with roles like Lumiere in Beauty and the Beast and Mark Cohen in Rent. He enrolled at Wagner College, majoring in drama.

His first professional theatre role was with the touring company of American Idiot in 2013 as part of the ensemble and understudy for the roles of Johnny and St. Jimmy. Boniello was also a cast member in 21 Chump Street during its 2014 premiere and is featured on the show's original cast album.

In 2015, Boniello performed in the Off-Broadway production, Brooklynite. Later in the year, he was cast as the "Voice of Moritz" in the Deaf West Production of Spring Awakening, and stayed with the company with its transfer to Broadway. He completed his run at the Brooks Atkinson Theatre on January 24, 2016.

On April 13, 2018, it was announced that Boniello would be replacing Mike Faist as Connor Murphy in Dear Evan Hansen on Broadway. He debuted in the role on May 15, 2018 and played his final performance on January 26, 2020 alongside co-star Andrew Barth Feldman.

As a producer, Boniello is known for his work on the Broadway musical Hadestown, for which he won the Tony Award for Best Musical in 2019.

During the COVID-19 pandemic, Boniello and Andrew Barth Feldman hosted Broadway Jackbox on Twitch, where they played games with other actors to raise money for Broadway for Racial Justice and the Actor's Fund of America. As the pandemic continued, he began streaming video games on his personal Twitch channel.

Boniello released his debut EP, Hi, on January 8, 2021.

His debut children's book, A Case of the Zaps, co-written with April Lavalle and illustrated by James Kwan, was published by Abrams Books in August 2022.

In March 2023, it was announced that he would be playing the recurring role of Crash, the headless ghost, on Ghosts, a television series on CBS. Also in March 2023, it was announced that he would be playing Jack of Diamonds in the Disney Channel's Descendants: The Rise of Red, the fourth installment in Disney's Descendants franchise. Also in 2023, he starred as Roger Davis in the World Symphonic Premiere of Rent at the Kennedy Center.

In October 2024, he appeared on Eisa Davis and Lin-Manuel Miranda's musical concept album Warriors as Cropsy.

== Personal life ==
Boniello proposed to his long-term girlfriend, April Lavalle, on May 9, 2021. The couple married on October 31, 2022. In posts published between 2024 to 2025, Lavalle revealed that she and Boniello were divorcing and alleged he had an affair with a costar during a production of Rent in Japan.

== Credits ==
=== Theatre credits ===
Year	Production	Role	Location	Category
2013–14	American Idiot	R&R Boyfriend, Ensemble, Johnny/Saint Jimmy u/s	—N/a	National Tour
2014	21 Chump Street	Tevin, Boy, and Cousin 1	Brooklyn Academy of Music	Concert
2015	Brooklynite	Ensemble	Vineyard Theatre	Off-Broadway
2015	Spring Awakening	Voice of Moritz	Wallis Annenberg Center	Los Angeles
2015–16	Spring Awakening	Voice of Moritz	Brooks Atkinson Theatre	Broadway
2017	Million Dollar Quartet	Elvis Presley	Paper Mill Playhouse	Regional
2017	Cruel Intentions: The Musical	Blaine Tuttle	Le Poisson Rouge	Off-Broadway
2018–2020	Dear Evan Hansen	Connor Murphy	Music Box Theatre	Broadway
2019	Hadestown	Co-Producer	Walter Kerr Theatre	Broadway
2021–22	Whisper House	The Gentleman Ghost	59 East 59 Theaters	Off-Broadway
2023	Rent	Roger Davis	The Kennedy Center	World Symphonic Premiere
2023	Almost Famous	Russel Hammond	Eugene O'Neill Theater Center	Workshop readings
2025	The Rink	Tony	Classic Stage Company	Concert

=== Filmography ===
Year	Title	Role	Type	Notes
2013	Alien Dawn	Elijah	Television	1 Episode: "The Montauk Project"
2013	Contest	Joe	Film	
2014	Unrelated	MT Guy	Television	2 Episodes
2014	Happyish	Participant 6	Television	1 Episode: "Starring Sigmund Freud, Charles Bukowski and Seven Billion A**Holes"
2015	Jessica Jones	Punk Kid	Television	1 Episode: " AKA Take a Bloody Number"
2018	Alt Space	Julian Barton	Film	
2019	Indoor Boys	Luther	Web Series	1 Episode: "Roomies"
2021	The Other Two	Indie Rock Band Singer	Television	1 Episode: 2.5
2021	The Bite	DJ Perfect Dan	TV Mini Series	1 Episode: 1.5
2022	Love & Gelato	Fleetwood Zach	Film	Netflix
2023	Ghosts	Crash	Television	Recurring Role, CBS
2024	Descendants: The Rise of Red	Jack of Diamonds	Film	Disney+ original film
2026	People of Note	Arc	Video Game	

=== Discography ===
==== Extended plays ====
Title	Album details
Hi	Release: January 8, 2021; Formats: Digital download

==== Singles ====
Title	Year	Album
"Pigeons"	2020	Non-album single
"Red" (with Kylie Cantrall)	2024	Descendants: The Rise of Red

== Awards and nominations ==
Year	Award	Category	Work	Result
2015	Ovation Awards	Best Acting Ensemble for a Musical	Spring Awakening	Won
2016	Broadway.com Audience Choice Awards	Favorite Onstage Pair (with Daniel Durant)	Spring Awakening	Nominated
2016	Fred and Adele Astaire Awards	Outstanding Ensemble in a Broadway Show	Spring Awakening	Nominated
2019	Broadway.com Audience Choice Awards	Favorite replacement (Male)	Dear Evan Hansen	Nominated
2019	Tony Awards	Best Musical (co-producer)	Hadestown	Won
