= Coop & Cami Ask the World =

American comedy television series

- Genre: Comedy
- Created by: Boyce Bugliari & Jamie McLaughlin
- Starring: Dakota Lotus; Ruby Rose Turner; Olivia Sanabia; Albert Tsai; Paxton Booth; Rebecca Metz
- Theme music composer: Paula Winger; Maria Christensen; Derek Coleman
- Opening theme: "Ask the World" by Dakota Lotus and Ruby Rose Turner
- Composers: Nick Pierone; Eric Goldman; Michael Corcoran
- Country of origin: United States
- Original language: English
- No. of seasons: 2
- No. of episodes: 49 (list of episodes)

Production
- Executive producers: Boyce Bugliari & Jamie McLaughlin; Dan Cross & David Hoge; Chris Peterson & Bryan Moore
- Producer: Leo Clarke
- Cinematography: Jim Roberson
- Camera setup: Multi-camera
- Running time: 22–24 minutes
- Production companies: Bugliari/McLaughlin Productions; It's a Laugh Productions

Original release
- Network: Disney Channel
- Release: October 12, 2018 – September 11, 2020

Coop & Cami Ask the World is an American comedy television series created by Boyce Bugliari and Jamie McLaughlin that premiered on Disney Channel on October 12, 2018. It stars Dakota Lotus and Ruby Rose Turner as Coop and Cami Wrather, two middle school-aged siblings who crowdsource their decision-making online, with Olivia Sanabia, Albert Tsai, Paxton Booth, and Rebecca Metz also starring. The series ran for two seasons, airing its final episode on September 11, 2020.

== Premise ==
Coop and Cami Wrather are two middle school-aged siblings who crowdsource their decision-making online. They present two choices for their fan base, which they call the Wratherheads, who chooses which stunt Coop, Cami, Fred, or Ollie have to do.

== Episodes ==
Season	Episodes	Originally released	
Season	Episodes	First released	Last released
1	21	October 12, 2018	April 13, 2019
2	28	October 5, 2019	September 11, 2020

== Cast and characters ==
=== Main ===
- Dakota Lotus as Cooper "Coop" Wrather, the host of Would You Wrather? and Cami's older brother
- Ruby Rose Turner as Cameron "Cami" Wrather, the host of Would You Wrather? and Coop's younger sister
- Olivia Sanabia as Charlotte Wrather, Coop and Cami's older sister
- Albert Tsai as Fred, Coop's best friend
- Paxton Booth as Ollie Wrather, Coop and Cami's younger brother
- Rebecca Metz as Jenna Wrather, Coop and Cami's widowed mother

=== Recurring ===
- Kevin Daniels as Principal Walker, the principal of North Plains Day School
- Jayden Bartels as Peyton, Coop's girlfriend and gaming partner
- Tessa Espinola as Pam, Cami's unpaid assistant who eventually turns against Cami and becomes her nemesis
- Reece Caddell as Minty (season 1), Cami's rival, who is revealed to have been enrolled into a military school at the beginning of the second season
- Gabriella Graves as Delaware, a quirky new student who becomes Cami's friend
- Gianni DeCenzo as Caleb, a nerd boy and Charlotte's first boyfriend
- Trinitee Stokes as Neve, Fred's girlfriend
- Gus de St. Jeor as Dixon (season 2), a hockey player and Charlotte's second boyfriend

== Production ==
The series was green-lit on May 4, 2018, with an expected premiere in fall 2018. Boyce Bugliari and Jamie McLaughlin serve as showrunners and executive producers. On August 17, 2018, Disney Channel announced that the series would premiere on October 12, 2018. In preparation for the premiere, the series would have a series of challenges in a special event beginning on August 17, 2018, where audiences could vote on social media on what music video from the series they would want to see on-air. The special event would end on September 21, 2018, with the release of a music video and multiple shorts. The music video would feature the theme song and main cast of the series, while the shorts would feature the main cast and other Disney Channel stars participating in "Would You Rather?" type challenges. The series is a production of It's a Laugh Productions. On January 25, 2019, it was announced that Disney Channel renewed the series for a second season. The second season premiered on Disney Channel on October 5, 2019.

== Ratings ==
Viewership and ratings per season of Coop & Cami Ask the World
Season	Episodes	First aired		Last aired		Avg. viewers (millions)
Season	Episodes	Date	Viewers (millions)	Date	Viewers (millions)	Avg. viewers (millions)
1	21	October 12, 2018	0.65	April 13, 2019	0.52	0.59
2	28	October 5, 2019	0.51	September 11, 2020	0.43	0.41
