= Ruby Rose Turner =

American actress and singer (born 2005)

- Born: October 16, 2005 (age 21); Santa Clarita, California, US
- Other name: Ruby Turner
- Occupations: Actress; singer; dancer
- Years active: 2012–present
- Television: Coop & Cami Ask the World
- Musical career
- Genres: Pop; teen pop
- Instruments: Vocals; piano
- Label: Walt Disney
- Publisher: Disney Music Group

Ruby Rose Turner (born October 16, 2005) is an American actress, singer, and dancer. She began her career as a competitive dancer, winning multiple national titles after making her television debut in the Spanish-language variety show Sábado Gigante in 2012. She gained recognition through appearances on Dancing with the Stars and roles in television series such as Coop & Cami Ask the World (2018–2020) where she starred as Cami. She also starred as Bridget in Descendants: The Rise of Red (2024), reprising the role in other media of the Descendants franchise. In addition to acting, Turner has pursued music and voice acting, including a lead voice role in Netflix's Eden (2021).

== Early life and career ==
Ruby Rose Turner was born on October 16, 2005, in Saugus, Santa Clarita, California, United States. She is the second oldest of four children. Turner began her entertainment career in 2012 at the age of seven, debuting as a dancer on the Spanish-language variety show Sábado Gigante on Univision.She spent four years training in competitive dance, earning a number of minor national competitions and awards. Her talent as a dancer led to appearances on Dancing with the Stars in 2014, where she participated in a live performance of "It's a Hard Knock Life" to promote the film Annie and later in a tribute performance with Julianne and Derek Hough. That same year, she made a brief appearance in Annie as one of the orphans. By 2016, Turner had begun transitioning into acting, landing roles on shows like Black-ish and Fuller House, where she played the role of Phyllis Gladstone in two episodes. Her role in Netflix's Fuller House was her first significant time as an actress. During this period, she also appeared in commercials and print campaigns for major brands such as Under Armour, Isabella and Chloé.

Turner's breakthrough role came in 2018, when she was cast as Cameron "Cami" Wrather for the Disney Channel comedy series Coop & Cami Ask the World. She played the character for two seasons, until the series ended in 2020. She also starred in a Disney Channel music video titled "Ruby Rock" in November 2018, where she showed off her singing and dancing skills. This was followed by Disney Music's "The Mirror" in April 2019, where she also showed off her singing skills, in addition to her acting. In February 2020, she signed with the agency CAA. The following year, she expanded into voice acting by voicing the character Sara in Netflix's animated sci-fi series Eden.

In 2024, she starred as Bridget, the young version of the Queen of Hearts, in the Disney+ film Descendants: The Rise of Red where the older version of the character was portrayed by Rita Ora. She cried when she realized she was cast in Descendants 4 back in 2021 or 2022 after getting off the plane, saying "It was incredible, and that feeling, honestly, has not gone away." She has also performed her song "Shuffle of Love" from the film's soundtrack, which quickly went viral, gaining over 33 million views in 12 weeks. She reprised the role of Bridget in the 2025 short film Shuffle of Love: A Descendants Short Story. She also starred as Susie Quinn in the film Almost Popular, which premiered on Dances With Films in 2024, before a theatrical release the following year. In January 2025, it was announced that she had been cast in the coming-of-age film Someone Saved My Life (later renamed Bloomington) as Beth, set to release in 2026. This was followed by her cast in the dark comedy film My New Friend Jim ten months later, in November 2025.

In September 2026, Turner released her song "Vanity" after signing up with Atlantic Records. The following month, she released "Clementine".

== Personal life ==
Turner has lots of interests and hobbies. She considers swimming and dancing to be her favorite activities. As of 2022, she lives with her parents and has a close relationship with her mother and sister, saying that the three of them are "inseparable".

== Filmography ==
=== Film ===
Year	Film	Role	Notes	Ref.
2014	Annie	Orphan	Uncredited	
2016	Burlap	Holly	Short film	
2025	Almost Popular	Susie Quinn	Lead role	
2026	Bloomington	Beth	Lead role	
TBA	My New Friend Jim	Eleanor Cory	Main role	

=== Television ===
Year	Film	Role	Notes	Ref.
2012	Sábado Gigante	Herself	Guest Dancer	
2014	Dancing with the Stars	Herself	Guest Dancer	
2016	Black-ish	Cool Girl	Episode: "Twindependence"	
2016–2020	Fuller House	Phyllis Gladstone	2 episodes	
2018–2020	Coop & Cami Ask the World	Cameron "Cami" Wrather	Lead role	
2021	Eden	Sara Grace	Main voice role (English dub)	
2024	Descendants: The Rise of Red	Bridget	Television film	
2024	Wickedly Sweet: A Descendants Short Story	Bridget	Short television film; Voice role	
2025	Shuffle of Love: A Descendants Short Story	Bridget	Short television film	
2026	Descendants: Wicked Wonderland	Bridget	Television film (archival footage)	

== Discography ==
=== Singles ===
Title	Year	Album
"Ruby Rock"	2018	Non-album single
"The Mirror"	2019	Non-album single
"Shuffle of Love"	2024	Descendants: The Rise of Red
"Vanity"	2026	TBA
"Clementine"	2026	TBA

=== Other charted songs ===
Title	Year	Peak chart positions			Album
Title	Year	US	UK	US Kid Albums	Album
"Life Is Sweeter"	2024	60	21	1	Descendants: The Rise of Red
