= List of Coop & Cami Ask the World episodes =

Coop & Cami Ask the World is an American comedy television series created by Boyce Bugliari and Jamie McLaughlin that premiered on Disney Channel on October 12, 2018. It stars Dakota Lotus and Ruby Rose Turner as Coop and Cami Wrather, two middle school-aged siblings who crowdsource their decision-making online, with Olivia Sanabia, Albert Tsai, Paxton Booth, and Rebecca Metz also starring. The series ran for two seasons, airing its final episode on September 11, 2020.

== Series overview ==
| Season | Episodes | Originally released | |
| Season | Episodes | First released | Last released |
|---|---|---|---|
| 1 | 21 | October 12, 2018 | April 13, 2019 |
| 2 | 28 | October 5, 2019 | September 11, 2020 |

== Episodes ==
=== Season 1 (2018–19) ===
| No. overall | No. in season | Title | Directed by | Written by | Original release date | Prod. code | U.S. viewers (millions) |
|---|---|---|---|---|---|---|---|
| 1 | 1 | "Would You Wrather Take Your Mom to the School Dance?" | David Kendall | Boyce Bugliari & Jamie McLaughlin | October 12, 2018 | 101 | 0.65 |
Thirteen-year-old Cooper Wrather and his younger sister Cami host an online show titled Would You Wrather?, in which they ask their 100,000 viewers, known as Wratherheads, to vote on "would you rather" questions to help them crowdsolve problems. Jenna Wrather, the mother of the four Wrather siblings, has decided to start dating following the death of her husband two years earlier. At school, Cooper's crush, Peyton, turns down his offer to go to an upcoming school dance together because of overdue homework she must finish on the night of the dance. Later, Cooper is upset when he learns Cami helped Jenna sign up for a dating website, as he believes Jenna is simply bored and needs a hobby. Coop and Cami are dismayed to learn Jenna plans to go on a date with their school principal, Mr. Walker, so they consult the Wratherheads for advice. With the date set for the same night as the dance, Coop decides to ask his mother out as his date, and she reluctantly agrees while cancelling her date with Principal Walker. However, Peyton arrives at the dance after finishing her homework early, and Jenna encounters Principal Walker at the dance. Coop later tells Jenna that he is uncomfortable with her dating anyone, but he decides he is okay with it after talking with her. Guest stars: Kevin Daniels as Principal Walker, Jayden Bartels as Peyton, Tessa Espinola as Pam
| 2 | 2 | "Would You Wrather Have a Hippo?" | David Kendall | Boyce Bugliari & Jamie McLaughlin | October 19, 2018 | 102 | 0.59 |
During their show, Cooper accidentally reveals that Cami still sleeps with a stuffed animal hippo named Ho Ho. Feeling embarrassed, she says that she outgrew Ho Ho years ago and now plans to donate the toy, but she is secretly upset when she later learns Cooper has donated it for her. Cami is running in a school election to become social chair, but she has trouble sleeping without Ho Ho. When she reveals this to Coop and Fred, they try to help her get over Ho Ho, but they are unsuccessful. Cami's competitor in the school election, Minty, reveals that she has Ho Ho and will return the toy if Cami admits her love for it during her campaign speech. Cami agrees, but after she speaks to the class, Coop and Fred reveal their own secrets, prompting the rest of the class to do so. Cami subsequently wins the election. Meanwhile, Charlotte has always believed her mother's story of how a burglar stole Charlotte's Ms. Fancy Pants doll. However, Charlotte discovers her mother lied and actually buried Ms. Fancy Pants throughout the backyard. Jenna confesses that she got rid of the doll because Charlotte was too obsessed with it. Guest star: Reece Caddell as Minty
| 3 | 3 | "Would You Wrather Put a Sock in It?" | David Kendall | Greg Schaffer | October 26, 2018 | 103 | 0.65 |
Overwhelmed by errands, Jenna has Coop fix a squeaky stair step. Impressed with his work, Coop decides to become a handyman around the household, like his father. However, Cami realizes Cooper is no good at fixing things, as she gets injured several times as a result of his work. Cami secretly repairs everything that Coop had worked on, to avoid hurting his feelings. Coop later finishes an old tree house that his father had begun building, and he invites the family inside, at which point Cami reveals the truth about his poor handyman skills. No one believes her until the tree house begins to fall apart. Jenna later reveals to the children that their father was also a poor handyman. Meanwhile, Charlotte volunteers to cook dinner for the family to help Jenna, but she has difficulty preparing the meal and has Fred help her. Fred prepares the entire meal, but Charlotte decides to take the credit after her mother praises the food. The following night, Charlotte has Fred prepare another meal, but he is horrified when Charlotte alters the meal to the family's liking. Fred later reveals the truth to the family.
| 4 | 4 | "Would You Wrather Have Potato Pants?" | David Kendall | Boyce Bugliari & Jamie McLaughlin | November 2, 2018 | 104 | 0.53 |
The Glamtronics, a singing group at school, agree to let Charlotte audition in exchange for an appearance on Would You Wrather? to promote their upcoming school concert. Coop and Cami later learn that the leader of the group, Manny, does not plan to put Charlotte in the group and is only using the show for the group's promotion. Cooper and Cami get revenge on the group by sabotaging their live musical performance on the show. Cooper and Cami then reveal the truth to Charlotte. Manny quits the Glamtronics after the other members criticize him, and Charlotte joins the group to replace him. Meanwhile, Ollie gets in trouble at school after pouring garbage on the desk of a classmate, Benjamin, who Ollie believes is the son of his wrestling idol, the Garbage Collector. Ollie dumped the garbage because he thought it would make Benjamin happy and prompt him to invite Ollie over to meet his father. Jenna later learns that Benjamin's father is a garbage man, not a wrestler, although he agrees to put on a Garbage Collector mask and pose as the wrestler to make Ollie happy. Guest stars: Zach Timson as Manny, Victoria Lopez as Deb, Ian Grey as Malcolm, Camille Chen as Sarah, Troy Metcalf as Benjamin's Dad, Travina Springer as Ms. Pappas, Arden Yang as Benjamin
| 5 | 5 | "Would You Wrather Be the Principal's BFF?" | David Kendall | Erica Spates & Sam Littenberg-Weisberg | November 9, 2018 | 105 | 0.66 |
After Principal Walker makes an unexpected appearance on Would You Wrather?, the students begin to think that he and Cooper are best friends, and they start shunning Cooper as a result. Cooper executes a failed prank on Walker in an attempt to convince the students they are not friends. Cami then helps Cooper with a new plan by greasing a school stage ahead of a speech that will be given by Walker. Shortly before the speech, Cooper calls off the prank and explains his dilemma to Walker, who sympathizes with Coop. Walker then voluntarily walks onstage and slips so he can blame Coop, convincing the students that they are not friends. Walker and Cooper agree to remain friends away from school, while maintaining a student-principal relationship during school. Meanwhile, Charlotte gets a job at the snack bar of a local ice rink, and the coach of Ollie's hockey team mistakes Fred for one of his seven-year-old players and has him play on the team during tryouts. Fred does well on the team, but Ollie is annoyed that Fred is not being a team player. Charlotte, annoyed by Fred's presence at the rink, informs the coach that Fred has been lying about his age, which gets him removed from the team. Guest stars: Kevin Daniels as Principal Walker, Reece Caddell as Minty, Tom Virtue as Coach Zappala
| 6 | 6 | "Would You Wrather Get Lost?" | David Kendall | Dan Cross & David Hoge | November 16, 2018 | 106 | 0.83 |
Jenna is upset that Coop and Cami are not better role models for Ollie, who they regularly feature on their show doing dangerous stunts. Cooper and Cami say they will treat Ollie better, but they lose him at the mall while shopping with him. Believing that some Wratherheads may be at the mall, Cooper and Cami decide to ask them for search help via their show, but their mother receives an alert every time they live stream. At the Wrather house, Fred must get Jenna's cell phone away from her so Coop and Cami can ask the Wratherheads for help without their mother finding out they lost Ollie. To distract Jenna, Fred has her and Charlotte participate in phone-free meditation. Coop and Cami are unable to locate Ollie, and later become trapped in the mall after closing time. They subsequently find that Ollie was with a mall security guard, who they had previously avoided in order to prevent their mother from finding out. However, when the children return home, Jenna checks her phone messages and discovers from the mall security that Ollie had been lost. To continue appearing on Would You Wrather? and to keep Coop and Cami out of trouble, Ollie accepts responsibility for getting lost in the mall. Guest stars: Tyler Poelle as Kangaroo Jim, Marilyn Sue Perry Ross as Security Guard
| 7 | 7 | "Would You Wrather Build a Sled?" | Robbie Countryman | Liz Suggs | November 30, 2018 | 109 | 0.61 |
Cami is upset when Charlotte decides to skip an annual sled race between the two that they have held for years, to instead spend a night with her friends at home. As revenge, Cami makes several attempts to sabotage Charlotte's get-together, with help from Fred and Ollie. However, Charlotte eventually reveals that she has been secretly working on a new sled in hopes of beating Cami in the race, while the get-together was meant as a distraction so Cami would not have much time to work on her sled this year. Charlotte wins the race for the first time. Meanwhile, when Principal Walker becomes sick, Jenna has a spare ticket for an opera and chooses Cooper to go with her, despite his reluctance. At the opera, Jenna uses the restroom while he uses her cell phone to play a video game. The lead singer, distracted by Cooper's use of a phone during the show, confiscates the phone. Jenna returns to the audience, and when she falls asleep during the show, Coop sneaks backstage to retrieve the phone from a wheelbarrow. However, he is wheeled out onto the stage and is challenged by the singer to compete against him through singing. Coop impresses the singer and the audience, and the singer returns the phone to him. Guest stars: Victoria Lopez as Deb, Roland Rusinek as Figaro, Natalie Ferreiro as Ensemble Performer #1, Hisato Masuyama as Ensemble Performer #2
| 8 | 8 | "Would You Wrather Get a Moose Angry?" | Jody Margolin Hahn | Maiya Williams | December 7, 2018 | 111 | 0.63 |
Jenna wants the family to have a classic Wrather Christmas similar to when her husband was alive. To help achieve this, Charlotte begins decorating the front yard with Christmas decorations, as her father used to do. Jenna is upset that Ollie keeps opening everybody's Christmas gifts early and spoiling the surprise, so Coop tells him the family story of Kramplemoose, an evil moose who punishes misbehaving children. However, Ollie does not believe the story, so Coop and Fred make several attempts to scare him into believing. Meanwhile, Cami and Minty are competing to receive the most donations for a food bank. Minty becomes trapped at the Wrather house during a snow storm, and Charlotte's decorations cause a power outage in the house, while Fred and Cooper's Kramplemoose ideas disrupt the family's Christmas celebrations, upsetting Jenna. Later, Cami and Minty venture out into the snow to try collecting more money to beat each other in the competition, but when Minty falls in the snow and loses a boot, Cami decides to turn back and help her, forgetting about the competition. Meanwhile, Charlotte has ordered a live moose as part of her outdoor Christmas display, but when it arrives in the front yard, Ollie believes it is Kramplemoose and says he will now behave. Eventually, the Wrathers spend a peaceful time together, although they learn that the moose Charlotte ordered never arrived due to the snow storm. Guest stars: Reece Caddell as Minty, Jack Stanton as Darby
| 9 | 9 | "Would You Wrather Be Orange?" | Jody Margolin Hahn | Erica Spates & Sam Littenberg-Weisberg | January 19, 2019 | 110 | 0.55 |
Cooper learns that Peyton, who had moved away, will be moving back to town and attending his school again. To impress Peyton, Cooper decides to get a tattoo of her face on his arm, but he passes out after seeing the tattoo needle. While he is unconscious, the tattoo artist, Jillian, accidentally paints an arm on his face instead. Cooper has Fred apply a concealer spray to hide the tattoo, but it later turns his face orange, so Coop applies makeup to hide the discoloration. Fred, inspired by a Spanish soap opera, puts on an elaborate ceremony at school to mark Cooper and Peyton's reunion, making her happy. Meanwhile, Jenna, who is a real estate agent, goes out of town for a day to attend a conference, leaving Charlotte in charge until her return later that night. When Jenna's return flight is canceled, she has Principal Walker watch the children, but Cami sabotages his attempts to bond with them. After Jenna returns, she learns Cami was worried about Walker replacing her father, but Jenna convinces her that no one could replace him. Cami and Walker then team up to perform a dance for a library fundraiser. Guest stars: Kevin Daniels as Principal Walker, Jayden Bartels as Peyton, Julia Cho as Jillian
| 10 | 10 | "Would You Wrather Escape?" | Wendy Faraone | Dan Cross & David Hoge | January 26, 2019 | 108 | 0.52 |
When Fred accidentally disrupts a Would You Wrather? stunt that Cami put together, she demands that Cooper take him off the show. The Wrather family is planning their annual visit to an escape room, but Jenna realizes she will be busy attending Ollie's school for his history project presentation on the night of the escape room event. Cooper has Fred fill in for Jenna, hoping he will lead the team to success and be forgiven by Cami, who is still upset at him over the stunt mishap. Fred eventually finds the key to the exit door, but declines to let the team win until Cami explains why she is still upset at him. She reveals that she is a perfectionist and sometimes wishes she could be more like him, as he is not easily bothered when things do not go as planned. She forgives him, and the team wins. Meanwhile, at Ollie's school, Jenna is upset that some of the other children were heavily helped by their parents in creating their projects. She is later disappointed to learn that Ollie reused Cami's old project as his own, and that the other Wrather children had used the same project in the past as well. Jenna also realizes she was the one who initially made the project. Guest stars: Tessa Espinola as Pam, CJ Hoff as Manager, Aisha Alfa as Mrs. Tipton
| 11 | 11 | "Would You Wrather Be the Heart or the Hammer?" | Robbie Countryman | Lena Kouyoumdjian | February 2, 2019 | 107 | 0.73 |
Coop and Cami are upset that the local ice rink has been sold to its owner's son, Bobby Bonafonte, who plans to turn it into a shopping center. Coop and Cami try their own methods to change Bonafonte's mind, but both are unsuccessful. They later learn Bonafonte was a skilled ice skater when he was younger, until he ripped his pants in front of an audience while attempting an ice skating move at the rink. Coop and Cami plan to help Bonafonte get over his embarrassment and remember his love of ice skating. Coop tries to perform Bonafonte's classic ice skating move but fails, prompting Bonafonte to show everyone the correct move. Afterward, Bonafonte decides to keep the rink open. Meanwhile, Jenna wants to earn a job bonus by selling a difficult house, so she enlists Charlotte and Ollie's help to convince potential buyers that the neighborhood is great for raising perfect children. While showing the house, Jenna has the children arrive to give scripted lines about the neighborhood, but Ollie forgets his lines and the two children begin fighting. Later, Ollie and Charlotte learn Jenna has hired actors to portray them, so they hire a woman to play their mother in a revenge plan against Jenna, with Ollie and Charlotte posing as imperfect neighborhood children. A family then decides to buy the house, convinced that their children will fit in with the neighborhood. Guest stars: Michael Cornacchia as Bobby Bonafonte, Beth Crosby as Karen
| 12 | 12 | "Would You Wrather Move to Canada?" | Trevor Kirschner | Greg Schaffer | February 9, 2019 | 112 | 0.56 |
Coop discovers Peyton is moving away again, this time to Canada. He is upset that she does not seem sad about the move, and is further upset when she fails to return a jacket he lent her. While Peyton's family is running errands, Coop and Fred search for the jacket at her house; they hide in moving boxes when moving men approach the house. The men pack the boxes in a moving truck, and Coop and Fred later realize they fell asleep in the boxes and are now on their way to Canada. Upon arriving at Peyton's new house, Coop and Fred learn she has only moved to nearby Canada Street and will still be attending the same school. Coop is relieved and decides to let Peyton keep the jacket. Meanwhile, Cami gets in trouble for pranking a neighbor and must spend time with Charlotte, who Jenna views as a positive influence. Cami joins Charlotte's bird calling group and turns out to be a talented bird caller. When the group is chosen to perform in a state bird call contest at the school, Cami suggests the group members wear bird masks to hide their identities, as she is embarrassed by her new hobby. Ultimately, Cami gets over her embarrassment and the group performs without masks. Guest stars: Jayden Bartels as Peyton, Victoria Lopez as Deb, Tessa Espinola as Pam, Ana Bowen as Prairie Chicken #1, Nicole Sherman as Prairie Chicken #2
| 13 | 13 | "Would You Wrather Lose a Luau?" | Jon Rosenbaum | Dan Cross & David Hoge | February 16, 2019 | 114 | 0.47 |
Cooper wins a game for his hockey team after having a bad day, and Jenna tells him that his father would repeat bad days because he believed it helped him win at bowling. Deciding to be like his father, Coop relives his bad day by repeating various events, which include getting attacked by a cat and accidentally spilling milk on Charlotte. Coop winds up winning another hockey game, but Charlotte begins avoiding him and his milk spills. At the house, Charlotte has invited her crush Caleb over. Realizing how much Charlotte likes Caleb, Coop decides to stop targeting her with milk, and he subsequently loses his next hockey game. Meanwhile, Cami, as social chair, is planning a luau party for the school, but she loses an envelope of money that was to cover the costs of the event. With help from a quirky new student named Delaware, Cami finds the envelope in a dumpster and retrieves it. Guest stars: Gabi Graves as Delaware, Gianni DeCenzo as Caleb, Telci Huynh as Clare, AJ Hudson as Jack
| 14 | 14 | "Would You Wrather Have a Beard?" | Trevor Kirschner | Boyce Bugliari & Jamie McLaughlin | February 23, 2019 | 113 | 0.47 |
Jenna plans to take the children to a water park, but only if they get good grades in school. Charlotte is dismayed to learn she received a "D−" in her German class. To save their trip to the water park, Coop and Cami add a good grade to Charlotte's report card, from a fictional psychology class. However, Jenna intends to meet Charlotte's psychology teacher during parent-teacher conferences, so the children devise a plan for Cooper to dress as the teacher. When Jenna invites the teacher to the family's house for dinner, Cooper is forced to alternate between himself and his disguise. Eventually, their plan is foiled, and Jenna reveals she had immediately recognized Cooper despite the disguise. The water park trip is canceled, and Charlotte learns a mistake was made on her report card and she actually received an "A" in her German class. Meanwhile, Ollie is being bothered by a boy at the ice rink, so he has Fred help him with the situation. Fred develops a crush on the boy's older sister Neve, and they set a date for the following day. However, due to a misunderstanding, they both believe they have been stood up, but they eventually reconcile. Guest star: Trinitee Stokes as Neve
| 15 | 15 | "Would You Wrather Catch a Fish?" | Jon Rosenbaum | William Luke Schreiber | March 2, 2019 | 115 | 0.55 |
Cooper and Fred take Ollie on his first fishing trip. Upon boarding the boat, Fred accidentally causes it to accelerate. With the throttle stuck, the boat continues speeding ahead until it runs out of gas in the middle of the lake, leaving the boys stranded with no cell phone service. They manage to return to shore after Ollie hooked a fish, which gradually pulled the boat toward land. Meanwhile, Cami joins the Clover Scouts to enter their new robotics competition, hoping to win a trip to New York City, where the winning robot will be presented. Charlotte is a former Clover Scout who earned all of the scout badges previously available, and she is obsessed with obtaining the new robotics badge, which Cami has agreed to give her if she wins the contest. Cami works on her robot with Jenna, but Charlotte and Jenna wind up finishing it together, which leaves Cami feeling left out. Cami had wanted to spend time with Jenna, and when she reveals her feelings to Jenna, the two decide to spend time together.
| 16 | 16 | "Would You Wrather Take a Worm Shower?" | Shannon Flynn | Boyce Bugliari & Jamie McLaughlin | March 9, 2019 | 116 | 0.64 |
Fred is happy to have made a friend of his own with a boy named Mason, but Fred keeps the friendship a secret, fearing Cooper will inadvertently steal Mason with his likability. When Cooper learns about Mason, Fred has Coop turn down his likability to keep Mason as a friend. However, while Fred is not around, Mason insists on becoming Cooper's friend. Mason secretly sabotages the boys' friendship, but Cooper eventually convinces Fred that he did not steal Mason away, and the two realize Mason wanted to take Fred's assistant position on Would You Wrather? Meanwhile, Charlotte wants to break up with Caleb after learning he does not recycle, but she has difficulty ending the relationship and decides to get help from Cami. Later, she learns Caleb does recycle and only lied in hopes that she would break up with him, as he is scared of her family. They realize they have more in common than they thought, and decide to continue their relationship. Elsewhere, Ollie has begun sleeping with Jenna due to a sudden fear of the dark, although she later learns he faked his fear so he would not have to make his bed every morning. Guest stars: Gianni DeCenzo as Caleb, Mitchell Wray as Mason
| 17 | 17 | "Would You Wrather Wreck a Record?" | Wendy Faraone | Lena Kouyoumdjian | March 16, 2019 | 117 | 0.49 |
For a behavioral sciences project, Minty wants to show how athletes fail under pressure, which she intends to demonstrate by filming Cami during the final upcoming round of a school archery tournament. Minty's intentions to film her cause Cami to lose confidence prior to the round, but she regains it after talking with Jenna. Cami wins the tournament and breaks the school record for most bullseyes. Meanwhile, Fred is unsure of what to talk about with Neve. When Fred learns Neve will be attending a book signing event for a fantasy novel series, he fakes an interest in the series despite his lack of knowledge about it. For advice, Fred has Charlotte accompany him to the event, where fans have dressed up as characters from the series. Neve realizes Fred has no knowledge of the series, but she is flattered that he sold his new bike to pay for his costume. Charlotte is upset to see Caleb at the event, as he had canceled their date because of an earache. Caleb reveals that he lied because he did not want her to know that he likes dressing up as characters from the series, but she accepts his interest. Guest stars: Reece Caddell as Minty, Trinitee Stokes as Neve, Gianni DeCenzo as Caleb, Beth Crosby as Karen
| 18 | 18 | "Would You Wrather Back Down?" | Wendy Faraone | Erica Spates & Sam Littenberg-Weisberg | March 23, 2019 | 118 | 0.65 |
When after-school clubs become mandated, Coop, Cami and Fred are late in signing up for their desired clubs and wind up in the school beautification club. Later, Coop and Cami audition for new openings in the drama club. Ultimately, there is only one role left in the club's upcoming play, and Cami convinces Coop that she should have the role. Fred later makes Coop realize that he always backs down to Cami, convincing him to pursue the role. Fred and Cooper trick the drama club teacher, Mr. Kramsky, into thinking Cami is sick, making him cast Coop instead. Before the play, Cami shackles Coop to a bench and goes on in his place, although he manages to make it onstage as well. When Coop reveals how much he wanted the role, Cami backs down and takes the spot in the beautification club instead. Meanwhile, Charlotte comments that she always had simple birthday parties unlike Ollie, prompting Jenna to lie and say that Charlotte's fourth birthday party was memorable with a pony and princess. Later, Jenna has Charlotte take Ollie to his friend's birthday party, giving Jenna time to videotape a fake fourth birthday to show Charlotte, although her plans fail. Guest stars: Benjamin Schrader as Mr. Kramsky, Ramone Hamilton as Evan
| 19 | 19 | "Would You Wrather Have Dance Face?" | Jody Margolin Hahn | Dan Cross & David Hoge | March 30, 2019 | 119 | 0.46 |
Cami and Delaware begin practicing to get onto a dance team, although Cami realizes Delaware makes an unusual facial expression while dancing. Delaware says she makes the face whenever she is concentrating on something, including her dance moves. Delaware decides to drop out of the contest to improve Cami's chances of getting onto the team, although Cami later insists that they audition together. After auditions are held, it is announced that Delaware has been accepted onto the team but not Cami. Meanwhile, Cooper must deliver an envelope of paperwork to Jenna's office before closing time, but he accidentally leaves it behind in a movie theater auditorium after he and Fred go there to see a film. The theater usher declines to let them back into the auditorium without paying again, and the film is sold out, so Coop and Fred enlist Charlotte and Ollie to distract the usher and theater manager. The children eventually retrieve the envelope and deliver it on time. Guest stars: Gabriella Graves as Delaware, Ciara Riley Wilson as Tara, Adwin Brown as Usher, Mary Passeri as Manager
| 20 | 20 | "Would You Wrather Just Dance?" | Jody Margolin Hahn | Greg Schaffer | April 6, 2019 | 120 | 0.54 |
Cami learns she did not get onto the dance team because the leader, Tara, only wants people who are fully committed to dancing. Cami tries to convince Tara that she can continue doing Would You Wrather? and stay focused on dance. Meanwhile, Charlotte becomes student ambassador to Tracy, a famous athlete and recent graduate of Charlotte's high school, which is inducting Tracy into its hall of fame. Charlotte is tasked with overseeing Tracy's visit to the school, and Coop and Fred decide to have Tracy take part in the next Would You Wrather? stunt. Charlotte, wanting to make a good impression as ambassador, does not want Tracy to be bothered with the stunt, although Tracy is delighted to take part in it. When the dance team's next rehearsal session is scheduled for the same morning as the stunt, Cami has her assistant Pam temporarily pose as her during the rehearsal. Cami rushes the Would You Wrather? episode along so she can get to her rehearsal sooner, but she is too late. Cami decides to quit Would You Wrather? after Tara gives her a choice between continuing the show or staying on the dance team. Later, Tracy writes positively about Charlotte in her ambassador evaluation. Guest stars: Gabriella Graves as Delaware, Ciara Riley Wilson as Tara, Tessa Espinola as Pam, Sadie Stanley as Tracy
| 21 | 21 | "Would You Wrather Help a Wrather?" | Robbie Countryman | Boyce Bugliari & Jamie McLaughlin | April 13, 2019 | 121 | 0.52 |
Coop is mad at Cami for quitting Would You Wrather? although he believes he can continue the show without her. When a stunt for the show's 499th episode does not go as planned, Cooper realizes that he needs Cami's expertise in putting together such stunts. Cooper decides to end the show, and Fred and Ollie ask the Wratherheads what they should do to change his mind. To get Cami to rejoin the show, Fred sabotages an order of costumes that were to be used by her dance team during their upcoming performance in a state dance competition. Coop is convinced to continue the show after talking with Charlotte, who reminds him that his first Would You Wrather? had made her laugh for the first time since their father died. After Fred reveals his sabotage, Coop and Cami reconcile and work together to create a new dance theme for the competition. Cami's team wins the contest, and Tara agrees to let her participate on Would You Wrather? while remaining a part of the team. Meanwhile, Jenna tries to fit in with the mothers of the dance team members. At home, Charlotte manages to trick Ollie into eating vegetables and taking a bath. Guest stars: Gabriella Graves as Delaware, Ciara Riley Wilson as Tara

=== Season 2 (2019–20) ===
| No. overall | No. in season | Title | Directed by | Written by | Original release date | Prod. code | U.S. viewers (millions) |
|---|---|---|---|---|---|---|---|
| 22 | 1 | "Would You Wrather Catch an Evil Bunny?" | Robbie Countryman | Boyce Bugliari & Jamie McLaughlin | October 5, 2019 | 205 | 0.51 |
Coop and Cami learn that someone has started their own web show, Which Would You Prefer?, which uses the same format as Would You Wrather? Several stunt ideas are stolen from Coop and Cami, and are performed on the new show. Coop, Cami, and Fred try to learn the identity of the new show's host, who wears a bunny costume to conceal their appearance. They eventually discover that Cami's assistant Pam is the host of Which Would You Prefer? Pam had grown tired of running errands for Cami, as they had taken up her free time, so she created the competing show as revenge. Meanwhile, Charlotte convinces Jenna to join social media, telling her that she can improve her real estate sales through it. However, Charlotte becomes annoyed when Jenna keeps sending her embarrassing public messages, leading Charlotte to un-friend her. Although Jenna is upset at first, she later concedes that she went overboard. Jenna and Charlotte reconcile, and Charlotte agrees to friend her again online. Guest stars: Kevin Daniels as Principal Walker, Trinitee as Neve, Gianni DeCenzo as Caleb, Jayden Bartels as Peyton, Tessa Espinola as Pam, Allison Bills as Marni
| 23 | 2 | "Would You Wrather Sing or Fly?" | David Kendall | Boyce Bugliari & Jamie McLaughlin | October 12, 2019 | 201 | 0.56 |
When one of Charlotte's a cappella members becomes sick, she has Cooper fill in ahead of a big performance. Because of his commitment to a cappella rehearsals, Coop does not have time to help Cami plan an upcoming Would You Wrather? stunt. Cami is upset when Charlotte considers adding Coop as a fulltime a cappella member. On the day of the performance, Cami tries convincing Coop to participate in the Would You Wrather? stunt instead. When Cami learns that Charlotte enjoyed spending time with Coop, she agrees to let him sing with Charlotte instead. Meanwhile, Jenna helps Fred plan a surprise birthday party for Neve at the ice rink, using old decorations from Jenna's past birthday parties. Jenna is surprised when she learns that Fred has planned the first portion of the party for Jenna as an act of gratitude. Guest stars: Trinitee as Neve, Ian Grey as Malcolm
| 24 | 3 | "Would You Wrather Be the Weakest Link?" | David Kendall | Chris Peterson & Bryan Moore | October 19, 2019 | 202 | 0.52 |
The dance team is set to compete in a tournament, and Tara plans to remove Delaware from the team unless she can improve her dancing. When Tara temporarily drops out of rehearsals to see her sick grandmother, Cami recruits Peyton to fill in. When Tara returns, she is impressed by Peyton's dancing and decides to bring her on fulltime as a replacement for Delaware. Later, the team learns that Tara had lied about visiting her grandmother. She had actually auditioned for a spot on the rival team, and was rejected. The team ousts Tara and chooses Cami as their new leader, while keeping Peyton and Delaware. Meanwhile, Coop is upset that Jenna has chosen Charlotte over him to take Ollie on a camping trip. Coop had wanted to relive a memory of him and his father when they hiked to a mountain peak. Coop and Fred sneak to the camp and retrieve Ollie so they can take him up to the peak. However, a rock slide destroys the pathway, separating Coop from Fred and Ollie. Charlotte arrives and rescues Coop, and the two learn that Ollie wants to spend time with both of them rather than having to choose. Guest stars: Gabriella Graves as Delaware, Jayden Bartels as Peyton, Ciara Riley Wilson as Tara
| 25 | 4 | "Would You Wrather Get a Selfie?" | Jody Margolin Hahn | Randi Barnes | October 26, 2019 | 204 | 0.50 |
Coop, Cami, Fred, Charlotte and Caleb have tickets to see a band. Cami and Fred go to the concert venue, while Coop and Charlotte plan to get there by having Caleb drive them. However, Caleb becomes upset when he learns that Charlotte did not like a fan fiction story that he wrote. Coop tries to cheer up Caleb so he will drive them, but Coop only makes matters worse when he tells Charlotte that Caleb views her as a perfectionist. Later, Coop gets the two to reconcile, and they eventually reach the concert. Meanwhile, at the venue, Cami wants to get a selfie with the band. Hoping to get close enough, Cami leaves Fred and becomes acquainted with Emma Wentworth, a high-schooler with a VIP concert pass. Cami lies to Emma, saying she wants to interview Emma for a school project, thus providing Cami access to the VIP area. However, Cami decides to leave Emma and rejoin Fred, realizing that friendship is more important. The singer of the group is impressed by Fred and Cami's costumes – which resemble the band's outfits – and invites the two onstage during the performance, allowing Cami to get her selfie. Meanwhile, Jenna has purchased a massaging chair, which she and Ollie fight over. Eventually, they decide to share it. Guest stars: Gianni DeCenzo as Caleb, Kate Buatti as Emma Wentworth, Thia Megia as Min, Sheaden Gabriel as Daewon, Kate Lin as Rikki, Aidan Prince as Crispin, Malik Barker as Doc Rhymes
| 26 | 5 | "Would You Wrather Have a Frozen Phone?" | Danielle Fishel | Kelly Hannon | November 2, 2019 | 206 | 0.46 |
Coop is preparing to participate in a junior firefighters test, hoping to carry on the legacy of his firefighter father, Eric Wrather. Nervous about living up to his father's reputation, Coop fakes a knee injury during the test so he can back out of it. When Jenna learns the truth, she instills confidence in Coop and arranges for him to retake the test, which he passes. Meanwhile, Cami and Pam are in a prank war against each other, but Jenna wants Cami to put an end to it. Secretly going against Jenna's wishes, Cami hires an anonymous person known as The Artist to splash Pam with paint. However, when Cami sends her request to The Artist by text message, her cell phone autocorrects "Pam" to "Mom," leading The Artist to believe that Jenna is the target. Cami's phone becomes frozen from a virus, and she has no other way of obtaining The Artist's phone number in order to call off the prank. Charlotte helps Cami to secretly keep Jenna safe from The Artist. They ultimately succeed, as The Artist winds up splashing them with paint instead. Guest stars: Regi Davis as Paul, Brent Bailey as Eric Wrather
| 27 | 6 | "Would You Wrather Get High Honors?" | Wendy Faraone | Boyce Bugliari & Jamie McLaughlin | November 9, 2019 | 209 | 0.60 |
Cami must complete a short documentary film as a school project, so she decides to film Charlotte and Cooper's a cappella group, the Glamtronics, as they prepare for a performance. However, Cami's teacher, Mr. Kramsky, is disappointed by the lack of drama in her film. To improve the film, Cami arranges for a nightclub owner to attend the upcoming performance, which puts pressure on Charlotte to make sure the performance is a success. Cami also convinces Coop that he should take on a bad boy role in the Glamtronics. Cami's actions ultimately lead to the break-up of the group. After consulting the Wratherheads, Cami decides to abandon her film project and tell the Glamtronics that she intentionally created drama between them. The group reconciles in time for the performance. Meanwhile, Fred becomes a hall monitor and tries to solve a 30-year-old school prank, hoping to get promoted to the position of head hall monitor. He eventually learns that Jenna was the culprit of the prank. Jenna had attended a different high school, and the prank targeted her rival school archery team. Jenna says she is sorry for the prank, and Fred decides not to reveal her secret. Guest stars: Kevin Daniels as Principal Walker, Ian Grey as Malcolm, Victoria Lopez as Deb, Benjamin Schrader as Mr. Kramsky
| 28 | 7 | "Would You Wrather Be Caught in the Middle?" | Wendy Faraone | Chris Peterson & Bryan Moore | November 16, 2019 | 210 | 0.48 |
Coop is upset when Cami reveals to Peyton that he has a fear of clowns. Later, Peyton is excited to show Cami her ability to squirt milk from her nose, although she is upset when Cami decides to show a video of the trick to Coop. To avoid further problems, Cami decides she will no longer talk to Coop and Peyton about one another. Wanting to prove he is not afraid of clowns, Coop intends to dress as one during a birthday party being held for Peyton's younger brother, Ryan. However, Cami learns from Peyton that her brother is also afraid of clowns. Initially unsure of what to do, Cami eventually decides to disrupt the party and stop Coop, but she learns that he had already found out about Ryan's clown fear. Meanwhile, Jenna catches Ollie eating sugary cereal that she had prohibited. Later, Charlotte catches Ollie with the cereal and forces him to confess to Jenna, while Fred convinces Jenna to increase his punishment. As revenge, Ollie threatens to reveal spoilers about a new film that Charlotte and Fred want to see, unless they get him more cereal and do his chores. Charlotte and Fred agree, but they later expose Ollie's deceit to Jenna after realizing that he never had any spoilers about the film. Guest stars: Jayden Bartels as Peyton, Landon Gordon as Ryan
| 29 | 8 | "Would You Wrather Live in an Igloo?" | Robbie Countryman | Joanne Lee | November 23, 2019 | 208 | 0.47 |
Ollie wants a later bedtime so he can watch a television show, but Jenna denies his request. Ollie wants Charlotte to convince Jenna otherwise, but Cami is determined to help him instead to prove herself as a good older sister. Jenna tells Cami that Ollie must follow the bedtime schedule as long as he lives in her house. Cami and Ollie decide to live on their own in an igloo in the backyard, to prove he can handle staying up later. Their plan ultimately fails, but Jenna admires Cami's commitment to help Ollie and agrees to extend his bedtime. Meanwhile, Coop has made a bet with his rival hockey team in which he must shave his eyebrows if his team loses. One of his team's best players, Jonathan Dixon, will not be allowed to play in the game unless he passes a chemistry test. Charlotte, who recently broke up with Caleb, agrees to tutor Dixon, and the two become smitten. Dixon passes his test, but he is upset when he finds out Charlotte had previously referred to him as a "dopey meathead." Still upset, Dixon plays poorly during the hockey game, until Charlotte explains that her comment about him was made before she truly got to know him. They reconcile, and Coop's hockey team wins the game. Guest star: Gus De St. Jeor as Dixon
| 30 | 9 | "Would You Wrather Lose Your Presents?" | Robbie Countryman | Maiya Williams | December 7, 2019 | 207 | 0.36 |
Jenna learns that the children searched the house for their Christmas presents to see if she got them what they wanted. Believing they have become too obsessed with presents, Jenna decides there will be no gifts this Christmas. To change her mind, the children devise a plan to get into a Christmas spirit and decorate the house, hoping to convince Jenna that they understand the holiday is about more than presents. While looking for decorations in the garage, the children find their presents and decide to open them, and are happy to see that they got what they had wanted. When Jenna suddenly approaches, the children quickly hide their unwrapped presents in her car trunk. Jenna takes the car out, but the vehicle breaks down and is taken to a repair shop. At home, Jenna is impressed by the children's Christmas spirit and decides there will be gifts this year. She later learns about the gifts being hidden in her car, and the family tries to reacquire them. However, the manager of the repair shop, Nick, declines to let the family get their gifts because it is closing time. The Wrathers work together to sneak their gifts out of the shop. After learning that Nick and his sister have been estranged for years, the Wrathers help him reconcile with her for Christmas time. Guest star: Kelly Perine as Nick
| 31 | 10 | "Would You Wrather Skate Circles Around Your Sister?" | Kelly Park | Randi Barnes | March 23, 2020 | 219 | 0.42 |
Cami and Charlotte have both signed up for a pair skating competition, which has a $300 grand prize. Cami's partner is Dixon, while Charlotte's partner is Cooper. The contest preparation brings out the competitive side in both girls, and they end up getting disqualified for fighting just as the contest is about to begin. Instead, Coop and Dixon team up for the contest and win the grand prize. Meanwhile, Ollie has begun wearing his father's wristwatch, but it is too big for him and he loses it somewhere. Fred helps Ollie look for the watch at an arcade, but it is closed for a private party, so they have to sneak in. Jenna eventually reveals that she found the watch and had it resized to fit Ollie. Guest stars: Tyler Poelle as Kangaroo Jim, Gus De St. Jeor as Dixon, Eddie Leavy as Judge Pringle
| 32 | 11 | "Would You Wrather Watch a Ferret?" | Kelly Park | Wesley Jermaine Johnson & Scott Taylor | March 24, 2020 | 211 | 0.42 |
Jenna is excited to be listing a large house for sale, and the Wrather children learn that the owners, the Wilcox family, have vacated the home. Feeling cramped at her own home, Cami goes to the Wilcox house to watch movies on the home theater. However, Charlotte also goes to the Wilcox house to practice her bassoon in peace, and Ollie has followed the girls into the house as well. Ollie has brought along his class pet, a ferret, which gets loose in the house. Ollie and the girls try to catch the ferret, but Jenna comes to the house to use its bowling alley, forcing the children to hide. Jenna eventually catches the children and then learns that a potential buyer, Mr. Daniels, is on his way over to look at the house. Upon his arrival, Jenna shows him around the house while the children try to catch the ferret, without being noticed. Meanwhile, Coop believes that Fred cheated in a leg wrestling match they had years ago, so they agree to hold a rematch at the Wilcox house. They are also caught by Jenna, and Fred wins the rematch when the ferret walks up to Coop, startling him enough to lose concentration. Jenna decides not to punish the children since she is also guilty of using the house for her own fun. Guest stars: Trinitee as Neve, Scott Dreier as Mr. Daniels
| 33 | 12 | "Would You Wrather Take a Dive?" | Trevor Kirschner | Boyce Bugliari & Jamie McLaughlin | March 25, 2020 | 212 | 0.41 |
Fred is upset when his younger sister, Marlowe, decides to return home for a break away from her school of performing arts. Fred finds her to be annoying, although he later learns that she left the school after humiliating herself, having fallen off a stage while singing. Later, Fred helps Marlowe regain confidence when they perform a song together on Would You Wrather? Meanwhile, Charlotte is preparing to compete in a debate tournament, and Pam and Cami are still involved in a prank war with each other. Charlotte is so startled by one of Pam's pranks that she accidentally bites her tongue, causing it to swell. Unable to speak clearly, Charlotte agrees to let Cami take her place in the tournament, and Cami wins. Guest stars: Tessa Espinola as Pam, Benjamin Schrader as Mr. Kramsky, Malea Emma Tjandrawidjaja as Marlowe
| 34 | 13 | "Would You Wrather Have a World Record?" | Sonia Bhalla | Boyce Bugliari & Jamie McLaughlin | March 26, 2020 | 213 | 0.45 |
Ollie is practicing piano for a recital, and Coop and Cami want to get him into a record book for the world's loudest burp, but the record officials will only be in town on the same day as the recital. Coop and Cami try to sneak Ollie out before his recital, but his teacher, Mrs. Krause, catches them. Cami then gets a record book official to come to the recital. After performing his recital and impressing the audience, Ollie lets out a large burp onstage which is noted by the record book official. Meanwhile, Neve had wanted Fred to go with her to a roller coaster park, but he has a fear of such rides, so he tells a lie to get out of going. He claims that Charlotte has a crush on him and he had to stay home to let her down gently. Charlotte agrees to go along with the lie, but Dixon mistakenly believes that Charlotte really does like Fred, and Neve becomes jealous when she thinks that Fred likes Charlotte back. When Fred reveals the truth, Neve is upset to learn that he lied to her, and she decides they need to take a break from each other. Guest stars: Trinitee as Neve, Gus De St. Jeor as Dixon, Jill Basey as Mrs. Krause, Sarah Cornell as Judy
| 35 | 14 | "Would You Wrather Turn 13?" | Trevor Kirschner | Randi Barnes | March 27, 2020 | 214 | 0.48 |
Cami's 13th birthday is coming up, and she is determined to make sure the party is a success, after each of her previous parties involved some kind of disaster. Coop and Fred go to a juice bar, where they think they have spotted Ariana Grande. They invite her to Cami's party, unaware that she is actually a juice bar employee named Jen. Meanwhile, Jenna and Charlotte hide Cami's birthday cake from Ollie, who is eager to try it ahead of the party. Jenna and Charlotte cannot resist trying a small part of the cake themselves, but they mess up the design. When Ollie learns what they have done, he reveals that he is a master at fixing cakes to appear untouched. Shortly before the party, Coop and Fred find out who Jen really is, and they are forced to tell Cami that Grande will not be coming to the party. Cami has already set up the party at school and told students that Grande would be there to perform, so they try to salvage the event by passing off Jen as Grande. Their plan fails, as Jen does not know the right lyrics, although Cami still has fun with the party and considers it her best birthday ever. Guest stars: Jayden Bartels as Peyton, Gabriella Graves as Delaware, Jami Alix as Jen, Theresa June-Tao as Paula
| 36 | 15 | "Would You Wrather Trash a Friend?" | Wendy Faraone | Matt Roman | April 3, 2020 | 215 | 0.32 |
Charlotte's environmental club is holding a fundraising auction, and artist Nils Schloo has donated a sculpture to the event to help raise money. Charlotte believes that Coop and Fred do not care about recycling, so they set out to prove her wrong. They end up recycling the sculpture, not realizing that it was art, but they later recover the pieces and reassemble it. However, the sculpture is missing a baby doll head from before, so Fred reluctantly gives up the head from his Lil Fred puppet as a replacement. At the auction, Nils makes an unexpected appearance and is disappointed to see that his sculpture has been altered, but he is happy when it sells for $10,000. Later, Charlotte gets Fred an identical puppet to replace Lil Fred. Meanwhile, Cami and Ollie have been bickering lately, and Jenna feels the need to have a spa day to relax. She brings Cami and Ollie along to wait in the lobby while she has her spa treatment, but the two continue to argue, ultimately getting the trio kicked out. Although Cami is older now and wants more personal space, Jenna convinces her that Ollie simply misses spending time with her and has been annoying her to get her attention. Guest stars: Dana Daurey as Susan, Joey Richter as Nils Schloo, Jan Hoag as Bidder
| 37 | 16 | "Would You Wrather Have Your Mom Bust You Out?" | Guy Distad | Wesley Jermaine Johnson & Scott Taylor | April 10, 2020 | 216 | 0.39 |
Cami is late to school because Jenna had to drop off paperwork first. Although it is not Cami's fault, Principal Walker gives her detention, saying that she is not exempt from the rules just because he and Jenna are dating. Being stuck in detention means that Cami will miss her dance competition, and her team will be disqualified without her, so she makes a plan to escape detention. Jenna is also upset at Walker for giving Cami detention, and she happily joins in on Cami's plan upon learning of it. They intend to use a mouse to scare off Mr. Kramsky, who oversees detention and has a fear of mice, but the plan is ruined when Walker fills in for Kramsky. Instead, Coop puts on a wig and switches places with Cami, allowing her to compete in the dance competition, although Walker eventually finds out about the scheme. Meanwhile, Fred learns that Neve has started spending time with a professional skateboarder named Ty. Desperate to win Neve back, Fred dresses up like a skateboarder to get her attention, but Charlotte convinces him that he should be himself instead. Fred tells Neve that he will work to improve himself and become a trustworthy person. Guest stars: Kevin Daniels as Principal Walker, Trinitee as Neve, Adrian Ciscato as Ty
| 38 | 17 | "Would You Wrather Lose Your Bestie?" | Jon Rosenbaum | Chris Peterson & Bryan Moore | June 1, 2020 | 222 | 0.34 |
Cami is suspicious when Pam begins acting nice towards her, believing it is part of another prank, but Delaware thinks Pam may be trying to reconcile. Delaware has taken up the hobby of power walking, although Cami does not share her enthusiasm about it. Delaware and Pam soon bond over the activity, and Delaware becomes convinced that Pam has changed, but Cami does not feel the same way at first. Later, Delaware convinces Cami to reconcile with Pam, and the three girls decide to power walk together using roller shoes, so they can roll back home when they get tired. Delaware discovers that Pam had rigged Cami's shoes in order to control them remotely for another prank, proving Cami right. Meanwhile, Jenna wins a store contest and chooses a foot spa as her prize, although Fred and the Wrather children prefer something different. Fred and Coop want a trampoline, while Ollie and Charlotte want a new laptop. Jenna agrees to return her foot spa in exchange for one of the other prizes, and she has the children give two presentations to convince her of which prize to pick. However, Jenna considers both presentations equally good and is unable to choose. She then learns that she cannot return her foot spa anyway, as all prizes are final. Guest stars: Gabriella Graves as Delaware, Tessa Espinola as Pam
| 39 | 18 | "Would You Wrather Have a Secret Admirer?" | Morenike Joela Evans | Boyce Bugliari & Jamie McLaughlin | June 2, 2020 | 223 | 0.32 |
Ollie develops a crush on a girl, and Coop helps him write letters to her as a secret admirer. Meanwhile, Delaware is unhappy because she feels invisible at her school, but she is cheered up when she starts receiving letters from a secret admirer, who turns out to be Ollie. Upon realizing this, Coop convinces Ollie that Delaware is too old for him, and she soon learns that he was her admirer, although Cami cheers her up. Elsewhere, Charlotte and Caleb, who have remained friends, are setting up a Renaissance fair for their school. Fred is concerned that the two will reconcile their romantic relationship, especially after Caleb reveals that he still has feelings for her. Fred calls Dixon to attend the fair and fight in a jousting contest against Caleb. Upon learning of this, Charlotte declares that she is not a prize to be fought over, and both boys agree to stop. Charlotte remains in a relationship with Dixon, and she and Caleb agree to continue being friends. Guest stars: Gus De St. Jeor as Dixon, Gianni DeCenzo as Caleb, Gabriella Graves as Delaware, Joelle Better as Joelle
| 40 | 19 | "Would You Wrather Live with Kramsky?" | Bryan McKenzie | Boyce Bugliari & Jamie McLaughlin | June 3, 2020 | 218 | 0.33 |
Cooper's hockey team is planning a tournament game in Toronto, but he needs money to go on the trip, and he does not want to ask Jenna because she is already stressed out with other financial issues. Mr. Kramsky is annoyed when his roommate brother invites other people to temporarily stay in their apartment. To raise money for Coop's trip, Cami secretly rents out the family garage to Kramsky as living space for a few days. Coop and Cami try to keep his presence a secret from Jenna, who usually only parks her car in the garage during the winter. However, when she decides to park in there ahead of a big storm, the children relocate Kramsky to a bedroom. Jenna eventually learns the truth and decides to refund Kramsky's rent payment, while telling Coop that she will find a way to finance his trip on her own. Meanwhile, at the ice rink, Charlotte is expecting Dixon to ask her out to the school prom, but he abruptly leaves after she sits down in a squeaky chair. She then becomes worried that Dixon mistook the sound of the chair for flatulence, but he reveals later that he was simply nervous about asking her to the prom, and she accepts his proposal to go with him. Guest stars: Benjamin Schrader as Mr. Kramsky, Gus De St. Jeor as Dixon
| 41 | 20 | "Would You Wrather Go to Prom?" | Wendy Faraone | Boyce Bugliari & Jamie McLaughlin | June 4, 2020 | 225 | 0.38 |
Charlotte is excited about her upcoming prom and wants it to go perfectly. She has gotten a dress for the event, but Cami secretly tries it on to see how she would look in it. The dress is stained when Ollie's friend accidentally spills food on it, forcing Jenna and Cami to find a replacement before Charlotte finds out. At home, Jenna has tasked Ollie with distracting Charlotte to keep her from finding out what happened to the dress. In a clothing store, Jenna and Cami find an identical dress, but must fight over it with another woman, Judy, who Jenna despises. Judy ultimately prevails with the dress, but Cami and Jenna sneak it away from her and plan to return it later. Meanwhile, Coop and Fred help Dixon learn how to waltz for the prom. They have Dixon rehearse with a broom, standing in for Charlotte. However, they accidentally knock out one of his front teeth while rehearsing, and they try to keep it a secret from Charlotte. Later, everyone confesses to Charlotte, who realizes she went overboard in trying to have a perfect prom. Guest stars: Gus De St. Jeor as Dixon, Sarah Cornell as Judy, Japheth Gordon as Lewis
| 42 | 21 | "Would You Wrather Say Goodbye?" | Wendy Faraone | Randi Barnes | June 5, 2020 | 224 | 0.37 |
The Glamtronics are scheduled to perform at the annual Firefighter's Ball, although Charlotte insists to Cooper that she is too busy with school work to participate. Meanwhile, Peyton's family is moving to New Mexico, a result of her father being in the military. Fred and Cami plan a farewell party to celebrate her last night in Minnesota, but they later realize that the event has been scheduled for the same night as the ball. Charlotte reluctantly agrees to perform at the ball with the other members of the Glamtronics. She will take over for Coop and sing the final song for him so he has time to attend the farewell party. At the ball, Charlotte becomes emotional and reveals to Coop that she had previously performed there with their father when she was five years old. She had been hesitant to return because of the memories it would evoke, as she still misses him. After Coop comforts Charlotte, they decide to proceed with the performance, although he ends up being late to Peyton's farewell party. Her family has already left, although she later has her father turn around so she can say goodbye to Coop. Guest stars: Jayden Bartels as Peyton, Gabriella Graves as Delaware, Victoria Lopez as Deb, Ian Grey as Malcolm, Sarah Cornell as Judy
| 43 | 22 | "Would You Wrather Dress Like a Pilgrim?" | Trevor Kirschner | Wesley Jermaine Johnson & Scott Taylor | June 12, 2020 | 226 | 0.35 |
Jenna will be receiving a local real estate award, and she wants her family at the ceremony with her. Jenna puts Charlotte in charge of getting Ollie ready for the ceremony, but he wants to show Charlotte that he can be ready on time without any assistance, and he proves that he can handle it. Cami wants to wear a mature outfit and makeup to the ceremony, matching what other teenage girls wear, but Jenna disapproves. Cami then puts on a Pilgrim outfit to mock Jenna's strict parenting, and in response, Jenna dresses as a green-haired 1980s teenager to embarrass Cami. They eventually agree to compromise on what Cami is allowed to wear. Meanwhile, Coop is upset when Peyton posts pictures online of herself with another boy named Jax. Thinking that Peyton has already moved on and found a new boyfriend, Coop and Fred devise a plan to make her jealous. Before heading to the ceremony, they shoot a video of Coop expressing his delight at being single, and then post the video online for Peyton to see. However, they learn that Jax is actually her cousin. Peyton forgives Coop after Cami explains to her that the situation was a misunderstanding. After the ceremony, Jenna learns that as a bonus for being the top realtor, she and the family will get to use her boss' lake house for the summer. Guest stars: Gus De St. Jeor as Dixon, Judith Drake as Ethel
| 44 | 23 | "Would You Wrather Crash a Wedding?" | Danielle Fishel | Chris Peterson & Bryan Moore | June 19, 2020 | 227 | 0.38 |
Charlotte has a bassoon performance coming up, and she wants Coop, Cami and Fred there, but they secretly have no interest. To get out of the event, they lie and claim that they will be busy attending a wedding for Gary, the sponsor of Would You Wrather? When Charlotte's performance is postponed, she decides to accompany the others to the wedding. To cover their lie, Coop, Cami and Fred take Charlotte to a real wedding being held for people they do not know, passing the event off as Gary's wedding. After numerous attempts to conceal the truth, Charlotte learns that the others lied to her. However, they help her realize that they always support her, even if they do not attend every performance. Meanwhile, Ollie is having trouble understanding his complicated math homework, and he will have to take summer school if he fails, which would disrupt the family's vacation plans at the lake house. Jenna tries to help him, but she too is unable to make sense of the homework. She contacts Principal Walker for help, but neither of them can figure it out even with the answer key. Ollie later finishes the homework on his own, with the help of an online tutorial video. Guest stars: Kevin Daniels as Principal Walker, Pilar Holland as Wedding Planner
| 45 | 24 | "Would You Wrather Rip Your Pants?" | Jody Margolin Hahn | Boyce Bugliari & Jamie McLaughlin | June 26, 2020 | 228 | 0.42 |
Summer has started, and the Wrather family and Fred arrive at the lake house. Coop is depressed about the end of his relationship with Peyton, and Fred wants to cheer him up. At a restaurant, Coop and Fred meet a girl named Annie who invites them to an upcoming beach cookout. As they are about to leave the restaurant, Fred accidentally rips his pants on a nail in his chair. Coop reluctantly agrees to switch pants with Fred underneath the table, with the tablecloth providing privacy. However, Coop's pants eventually get ripped as well, forcing them to devise a way to sneak out. Meanwhile, Cami gets into a dispute with a restaurant employee named Noah. They both need to use the restroom, and both refuse to let the other have the restroom key. Cami and Noah both hold on to the key while trying multiple efforts to make the other let go. The antics at the restaurant cheer up Coop and help him get over Peyton. At the lake house, Charlotte accidentally damages a portrait, and Kitty, the mother of Jenna's boss, is arriving soon to show the family around the house. They try to cover up the damage but later learn that Kitty disliked the portrait. Guest stars: Jaden Micah Wolfe as Noah, Madison Calderon as Annie, Jane Carr as Kitty
| 46 | 25 | "Would You Wrather Be the Wagners?" | Monica Marie Contreras | Chris Peterson & Bryan Moore | July 17, 2020 | 217 | 0.30 |
Coop wants to revive his father's tradition of taking the family out to baseball games. The Wrathers arrive at the stadium to pick up their tickets, but Coop and Cami learn there is no record of the purchase. Instead, they claim tickets intended for the Wagner family, thinking there was simply a mix-up with the names. The Wrathers are seated in a luxury box, where the children soon learn that the tickets were intended for another family. The baseball team owner, Mrs. Derricks, is a fan of author Carolyn Wagner and had invited her family to the game, although they never arrive to claim their tickets. The children pose as the Wagners and try to keep Jenna from finding out, by limiting her contact with Derricks. Jenna eventually learns the truth, but she appreciates the effort that the children went through. Meanwhile, Marlowe hosts a one-person show in an effort to make friends at her new school, but the children are bored with her performance. Fred convinces Marlowe that she will make friends eventually. Guest stars: Malea Emma Tjandrawidjaja as Marlowe, Gus De St. Jeor as Dixon, Caleb Pierce as Ticket Guy, Rosa Blasi as Mrs. Derricks
| 47 | 26 | "Would You Wrather Have a Pig in a Cowboy Hat?" | Jon Rosenbaum | Kelly Hannon | August 7, 2020 | 220 | 0.29 |
Guest stars: Kevin Daniels as Principal Walker, Benjamin Schrader as Mr. Kramsky, Ben Giroux as Mr. Bonavich, Lonyé Perrine as Sabrina
| 48 | 27 | "Would You Wrather Move?" | Robbie Countryman | Boyce Bugliari & Jamie McLaughlin | August 14, 2020 | 221 | 0.32 |
Guest stars: Kevin Daniels as Principal Walker, Ben Giroux as Bonavich, Juan Garcia as Board Member
| 49 | 28 | "Would You Wrather Have a Snow Day?" | Jody Margolin Hahn | Wesley Jermaine Johnson & Scott Taylor | September 11, 2020 | 203 | 0.43 |
Guest stars: Kevin Daniels as Principal Walker, Gabriella Graves as Delaware, Aisha Alfa as Mrs. Tipton, Rick Chambers as Duke Thunders
