= Joshua Colley =

American actor and singer

- Born: Joshua Robert Colley; January 20, 2002 (age 24); New Port Richey, Florida, U.S.
- Occupations: Actor; singer
- Years active: 2012–present

Joshua Robert Colley (born January 20, 2002) is an American actor and singer.

== Background ==
Joshua Robert Colley was born on January 20, 2002 in New Port Richey, Florida, to Brad and Robbie Lynn Colley. He grew up in Trinity, Florida. He has a twin brother named Cameron.

== Career ==
Colley played the role of Les in the musical Newsies between March 11, 2013, and February 2, 2014. In January 2014, it was announced that he would play the role of Gavroche in the Broadway revival of Les Misérables, alternating in the role with a friend, Gaten Matarazzo. Colley began performing with the show when it began previews on March 1, 2014 and left on March 1, 2015. The Huffington Post felt his performance was "'grounded and believable and anything but an outtake from Oliver!" In 2014, Colley was cast as the voice of Pig Robinson in Peter Rabbit, an animated television show on Nick Jr. He voiced the role from 2014 to 2015.

He played the lead role in You're a Good Man, Charlie Brown at the York Theater Company from May 24, 2016, to June 26, 2016. The cast album was released on November 18, 2016, by Broadway Records. He took a week off during the run to perform in The Little Mermaid at the Hollywood Bowl. Colley played the role of Flounder in the first week of June 2016; Sara Bareilles was one of the stars in the show. In 2021, he joined the cast of Hulu's Sex Appeal as well as a comedy movie, Senior Year. In the final season of a Hulu series Love, Victor, he portrayed Liam, Victor's sharp-tongued classmate. In 2024, he played Monty, a crow who turns into a teenaged boy, in the first season of Dead Boy Detectives, a Netflix series. He plays Captain Hook as a teen in a 2024 Disney+ film, Descendants: The Rise of Red. Colley starred as Orpheus in Hadestown on Broadway, from March 3, 2026 to May 31, 2026.

== Personal life ==
In a 2022 ABC News primetime documentary special about the LGBTQ+ experience, Colley spoke for the first time about his sexuality, "I am still learning who I am and what I like... I don't really feel like I'm wanting to put a label on myself... It's ever-changing and ever-evolving," He said he is "definitely not straight."

== Filmography ==
Year	Title	Role	Notes
2022	Sex Appeal	Tristan	
2022	Senior Year	Yaz	
2022	Love, Victor	Liam	2 episodes
2024	Dead Boy Detectives	Monty	Recurring role
2024	Descendants: The Rise of Red	Young Hook	
2026	Abbott Elementary	Tommy	Episode: "Competition"
2026	Brian	TBA	

== Theater credits ==
Year	Title	Role	Venue	Notes
2012-13	Les Misérables	Gavroche	US National Tour	25th Anniversary
2013–14	Newsies	Les	Nederlander Theatre	Broadway
2014–15	Les Misérables	Gavroche	Imperial Theatre	Broadway
2015	Elf The Musical	Michael Hobbs	US National Tour	
2016	A Bronx Tale	Young Calogero	Paper Mill Playhouse	World Premiere
2016	You're a Good Man, Charlie Brown	Charlie Brown	York Theatre	Off-Broadway
2016	The Little Mermaid	Flounder	Hollywood Bowl	Concert
2026	Hadestown	Orpheus	Walter Kerr Theatre	Broadway
