= Descendants: The Rise of Red =

2024 American musical teen fantasy comedy

- Promotional poster
- Written by: Dan Frey; Ru Sommer
- Directed by: Jennifer Phang
- Starring: Kylie Cantrall; Malia Baker; Dara Reneé; Ruby Rose Turner; Morgan Dudley; Melanie Paxson; Joshua Colley; Julee Cerda; Leonardo Nam; Paolo Montalban; Jeremy Swift; China Anne McClain; Rita Ora; Brandy
- Composer: Torin Borrowdale
- Country of origin: United States
- Original language: English

Production
- Executive producers: Suzanne Todd; Gary Marsh
- Producer: Wendy S. Williams
- Cinematography: Declan Quinn
- Editor: Katie Ennis
- Running time: 94 minutes
- Production companies: Suzanne Todd Productions; Potato Monkey Productions; GWave Productions, LLC.; Disney Channel

Original release
- Network: Disney+
- Release: July 12, 2024

Descendants: The Rise of Red is a 2024 American musical teen fantasy comedy film directed by Jennifer Phang from a screenplay by Dan Frey and Ru Sommer. Produced by Disney Channel, the film is the fourth installment in the Descendants franchise, being a spin-off of the previous three films and a direct follow-up from Descendants: The Royal Wedding (2021). The film was released on Disney+ on July 12, 2024, and made its debut on Disney Channel on August 9, 2024.

Kylie Cantrall and Malia Baker star as Red (daughter of Queen of Hearts from Alice in Wonderland) and Chloe Charming (daughter of Cinderella and Prince Charming from Cinderella), respectively. China Anne McClain and Melanie Paxson reprise their roles of Uma and Fairy Godmother, respectively, from previous Descendants films. Cinderella and King Charming are played by Brandy and Paolo Montalban, who previously played versions of the characters in the 1997 television adaptation of Cinderella.

Descendants: The Rise of Red received generally mixed reviews from critics. With 6.7 million views in its first three days of streaming, the film broke a record in its debut on Disney+ as Disney Branded Television's most-viewed premiere ever on the platform. The film later demonstrated substantial streaming viewership, leading as the top streaming original movie for a week and maintaining strong rankings throughout July and early August 2024. It became Disney+'s most-streamed live-action original movie since Hocus Pocus 2. A sequel, Descendants: Wicked Wonderland, was released in 2026.

== Plot ==
Soon after the wedding of King Ben and Mal, Uma is now the headmistress and principal of Auradon Prep. Her first order of business is to open the border between Auradon and Wonderland by inviting Princess Red, the rebellious daughter of the tyrannical Queen of Hearts, to join the school. The Fairy Godmother advises against this, but Uma insists that Carlos de Vil would have been supportive of it. In Wonderland, Red's tutor, Maddox Hatter, shows her a magic pocket watch that he invented, which could be used to travel through time. Maddox suggests that Red might be able to use the watch to help her mother, who was once a good person, but warns her of the potential dangers involved. Red secretly steals the watch.

Red and her mother travel to Auradon, where the Queen and Cinderella reunite for the first time since their days at Merlin Academy, the original name of Auradon Prep. The meeting quickly turns hostile as the Queen recalls a traumatic prank she endured during their time at school. During the opening ceremony, as Uma welcomes everyone, the Queen unexpectedly launches a coup d'état using her magical deck of cards, and takes the other attendees hostage.

When Cinderella refuses to bow to the Queen, a reluctant Red is forced to condemn her to death by beheading for treason, delighting her mother but angering the crowd. In horror and guilt, Red tries to use the magic watch to go back a few minutes in time and prevent the coup by stealing her mother's cards, but is attacked by Cinderella's perfectionist and kindhearted daughter Chloe, accidentally activating the watch and sending both girls to the past, when Auradon Prep was still called Merlin Academy. Believing they were sent there for a reason, Red and Chloe begrudgingly agree to work together for the sake of their mothers.

Posing as exchange students, Red and Chloe enroll at Merlin Academy and meet Ella and Bridget, the teenage personas of Cinderella and the Queen of Hearts, and begin to seek ways to change the "present". They are shocked at their mothers' personalities, with Bridget being nice to a fault and Ella having no interest in royalty. They also meet the younger versions of some of Auradon's future villains, led by Uliana, Ursula's younger sister. After purposely eating too many of Bridget's enchanted flamingo-feathered cupcakes, Uliana briefly turns into a flamingo and is humiliated in front of the whole school, so she decides to take revenge on Bridget.

Red and Chloe decide to talk to Ella to find out more, and find out that Uliana hangs out at the Black Lagoon, where they overhear the villains planning to give Bridget a cupcake that will turn her into a monster during the dance, using a sorcerer's cookbook. Realizing this must have been the prank that turned Bridget evil, Red and Chloe find the cookbook in Merlin's study, and after struggling with the defenses Merlin has put in place, they are successful. However, the villains are able to take it from them, but because the book should not fall "into the wrong hands," they are magically frozen, and Merlin discovers them and gives them detention. Red is able to hide the cookbook, and the two girls head back to the present.

Red and Chloe return to the present as Uma is giving her speech, and the Queen of Hearts delivers the same lines she gave in the original timeline. Red initially fears that nothing has changed, but is relieved to see that the Queen is now wearing a lighter gown and merely creates a cloud of heart-shaped bubbles for the celebration. Through narration, Uma informs the audience that this is a happy ending, but hints that messing with the fabric of time can have dangerous consequences, and that the story is not over yet.

== Cast ==
- Kylie Cantrall as Red, daughter of Queen of Hearts
- Malia Baker as Chloe Charming, daughter of Cinderella and King Charming
- China Anne McClain as Uma, daughter of Ursula, the newest headmistress and principal of Auradon Prep
- Dara Reneé as Uliana, younger sister of Ursula and aunt of Uma, who was the leader of a gang of VKs ("Villain Kids") in the past
- Rita Ora as the Queen of Hearts of Wonderland, Red's mother
  - Ruby Rose Turner as Bridget, the young Queen of Hearts
- Brandy as Cinderella, Chloe's mother
  - Morgan Dudley as Ella, the young Cinderella
- Joshua Colley as Hook, a member of Uliana's gang of VKs
- Peder Lindell as Morgie, son of Morgana le Fay and a member of Uliana's gang of VKs
- Paolo Montalban as King Charming, Chloe's father
  - Tristan Padil as young Prince Charming
- Melanie Paxson as Fairy Godmother
  - Grace Narducci as Fay, the young Fairy Godmother
- Levin Valayil as Aladdin
  - Kabir Bery as young Aladdin
- Shazia Pascal as Jasmine
  - Aiza Azaar as young Jasmine
- Jeremy Swift as Merlin, principal of Merlin Academy
- Leonardo Nam as Maddox Hatter, son of the Mad Hatter and Red's tutor
- Alex Boniello as Jack of Diamonds, captain of the Queen of Hearts' Red Army
- Sam Morelos as Meadow, a student at Merlin Academy
- Mars as Maleficent, a member of Uliana's gang of VKs
- Anthony Pyatt as Hades, a member of Uliana's gang of VKs
- Julee Cerda as Evil Stepmother, Ella's wicked stepmother.

Dove Cameron, Mitchell Hope, Sofia Carson, Booboo Stewart and Cameron Boyce (posthumously) appear in archive footage scenes during the film's introduction as Mal, Ben, Evie, Jay and Carlos, respectively, from previous installments. They also appear, in addition to Sarah Jeffery, Brenna D'Amico and Thomas Doherty as Audrey, Jane and Harry, also from previous installments, in portraits from Uma's office.

== Production ==
On August 18, 2021, following the release of the animated special Descendants: The Royal Wedding, Lauren Kisilevsky, Disney Branded Television's Senior Vice President of Original Movies, responded to questions regarding the special's cliffhanger by saying that "[t]he tease is a tease", and was added due to the Descendants films ending with hints at additional stories, and also said that "Disney Channel would see where [they] get with the franchise".

On September 21, 2021, a fourth Descendants film was confirmed to be in development as part of an overall deal between Disney and former Disney Branded Television president Gary Marsh's production company. By May 2022, the film was greenlight by Disney+ as a spin-off under the working title of The Pocketwatch. Jennifer Phang was hired as director and co-executive producer, with Dan Frey and Russell Sommer writing the screenplay and Marsh executive-producing.

On March 21, 2023, the official title for the film was announced as Descendants: The Rise of Red.

The costumes for Descendants: The Rise of Red were designed by Emilio Sosa.

=== Filming ===
Filming for Descendants: The Rise of Red began in early January 2023 under its working title The Pocketwatch. Mark Hofeling returned from the original trilogy as production designer. Phang said she wanted the choreography during action sequences to still be able to tell an emotional story. For Wonderland's design, Phang used Alice in Wonderland (1951) as a reference while also drawing inspiration from her previous filmmaking experience. Filming took place in Atlanta beginning at the end of January 2023 with plans to run through mid-March.

=== Casting ===
The featured cast announced at the 2022 D23 Expo included China Anne McClain, who is returning to portray Uma, with Kylie Cantrall (as Red) and Dara Reneé (as Uliana) joining the cast of the film. In November 2022, casting announcement revealed that Brandy Norwood was returning as Cinderella after playing the role in the 1997 film Cinderella and Melanie Paxson returned to the franchise as the Fairy Godmother. New cast members to the franchise were Rita Ora as the Queen of Hearts as well as Malia Baker, Ruby Rose Turner, Morgan Dudley, and Joshua Colley. After filming had begun, Jeremy Swift and Leonardo Nam were announced as cast additions in February 2023. In March 2023, it was announced that Paolo Montalban was cast as King Charming who, like Norwood, played a version of the character in the 1997 film Cinderella. It was also announced in March 2023 that Alex Boniello was cast as the Jack of Diamonds. Rita Ora commented that the star of the previous films Dove Cameron helped her prepare for her role as Queen of Hearts by giving her advice about the franchise and the Descendants universe.

=== Visual effects ===
According to Phang, visual effects were used to "enhance" the locations featured in the film.

== Music ==
Descendants: The Rise of Red features 13 songs. The first single "What's My Name (Red Version)" was released on April 26, 2024, along with the pre-order of the soundtrack. The soundtrack was released on July 12, 2024, to coincide with the film's release. The second single "Red" was released on June 21, 2024.

A special holiday song "Red Christmas" was released on September 13, 2024, separate from the soundtrack.

Halloween remixes of "Red", "Love Ain't It", "Fight of Our Lives", and "Perfect Revenge" were released on the Descendants: The Rise of Red - Halloween EP on September 27, 2024. On that same day, the karaoke version of the soundtrack was released.

== Release ==
The trailer of Descendants: The Rise of Red generated 86 million views in 10 days and amassed 4.5 million total engagements. It became Disney Branded Television’s most-watched trailer of all time in a 10-day window. The film was released on Disney+ on July 12, 2024, followed by the linear premiere on Disney Channel in the United States on August 9, 2024. The Rise of Red was temporarily removed from Disney+ a few days after its release on the platform. The absence of an official statement from Disney has led to speculation that the removal may have been caused by a temporary technical glitch.

== Reception ==
=== Viewership ===
Descendants: The Rise of Red was watched by 6.7 million viewers in its first three days of streaming on Disney+. It became Disney Branded Television’s highest original movie premiere on the streaming service. Luminate, which measures streaming performance in the U.S. by analyzing viewership data, audience engagement metrics, and content reach across various platforms, calculated that the film was the most-streamed original movie from July 12 – 18, with 1.1 billion minutes of watch time. It was later the third most-streamed original movie from July 19 – 25, with 299.1 million minutes of watch time. The Rise of Red was subsequently the fourth most-streamed original during the week of 26 July – August 1, with 141.8 million minutes of watch time and 1.5 million views.

FlixPatrol, which monitors daily updated VOD charts across the globe, reported that the movie reached Disney+'s number one film ranking in the United States on July 27, and reached number two on August 11. Analytics company Samba TV, which gathers viewership data from certain Smart TVs and content providers, reported that The Rise of Red was the eighth top streaming programs for the week of August 5–11. In August, Disney announced that the film has reached 20 million views worldwide. In October, the movie became Disney+'s most-watched live-action original movie since Hocus Pocus 2 in September 2022. Since its release on July 12, it garnered 33 million viewers over 12 weeks.

=== Critical response ===
On the review aggregator website Rotten Tomatoes, 57% of 7 critics' reviews are positive, with an average rating of 5.10/10.

Lauren Brown West-Rosenthal of Parents praised how The Rise of Red reminds viewers that childhood experiences shape who people become, complimented the movie's emphasis on "girl power," saying characters like Red serve as strong role models, and stated the film depicts meaningful conversations between parents and children about personal growth and overcoming challenges. Katelyn Mensah of Radio Times gave The Rise of Red a grade of four out of five stars, praised the performances of the actors, particularly Kylie Cantrall and Malia Baker, noting their strong chemistry and character development, complimented the diverse musical styles and the dynamic duets, especially between Cantrall and Rita Ora, and highlighted the film's positive themes of self-discovery, empowerment, and unexpected friendships.

John Serba of Decider remarked that the film adheres to the Disney Channel's typical formula, citing vibrant visuals and upbeat atmosphere, noted that the new characters are not significantly different from the originals, suggesting fans of Descendants will likely enjoy them, and said that Rise of Red delivers positive messages and expected feel-good experience, although without taking any creative risks. Jennifer Green of Common Sense Media gave The Rise of Red a score of three out of five stars, noted the presence of positive messages and role models, citing empathy and treating others with kindness, but called the film "overstuffed."

=== Accolades ===
Year	Award	Category	Nominee(s)	Result	Ref.
2025	Art Directors Guild Awards	Television Movie	Descendants: The Rise of Red	Nominated	
2025	Directors Guild of America Awards	Outstanding Directorial Achievement in Children's Programs	Descendants: The Rise of Red	Nominated	
2025	NAACP Image Awards	Outstanding Children's Program	Descendants: The Rise of Red	Nominated	
2025	NAACP Image Awards	Outstanding Supporting Actress in a Limited Television (Series, Special, or Movie)	Brandy Norwood	Nominated	
2025	Kids' Choice Awards	Favorite Movie	Descendants: The Rise of Red	Nominated	
2025	Kids' Choice Awards	Favorite Villain	Rita Ora	Nominated	
2025	Kids' Choice Awards	Favorite Butt-Kicker	Kylie Cantrall	Nominated	
2026	Children's and Family Emmy Awards	Outstanding Fiction Special	Gary Marsh, Suzanne Todd, Mahita P. Simpson, Wendy S. Williams, Dan Frey, Ru Sommer and Jennifer Phang	Won	
2026	Children's and Family Emmy Awards	Outstanding Supporting Performer	Dara Reneé	Nominated	
2026	Children's and Family Emmy Awards	Outstanding Art Direction/Set Decoration/Scenic Design	Mark Hofeling, Hunter Brown, Devita Walker, and MaryAnn George	Won	
2026	Children's and Family Emmy Awards	Outstanding Casting for a Live-Action Program	Craig Fincannon, Lisa Mae Fincannon, Alexis Frank Koczara, Christine Smith Shevchenko, Kimberly Wistedt, Becca Burgess and Gianna Butler	Nominated	
2026	Children's and Family Emmy Awards	Outstanding Choreography	Ashley Wallen	Won	
2026	Children's and Family Emmy Awards	Outstanding Stunt Coordination for a Live Action Program	Chelsea Bruland	Nominated	
2026	Children's and Family Emmy Awards	Outstanding Costume Design/Styling	Aliyah B. Kirkland, Julia Caston, Emilio Sosa, and Allison Choi Braun	Nominated	
2026	Children's and Family Emmy Awards	Outstanding Makeup and Hairstyling	Andrea Jackson, Sherriere Ashante, Antoinette Black, O'Dena Gibson, Evan Hynes, Nikk Nelson, Paul Cha, Essie Cha, Caroline Monge, Alex Lucas, Gaby Torell, and Steven Weaver	Won	
2026	Children's and Family Emmy Awards	Outstanding Music Direction and Composition for a Live Action Program	Torin Borrowdale	Nominated	
2026	Children's and Family Emmy Awards	Outstanding Original Song for a Children's and Young Teen Program	Jeannie Lurie and Matthew Tishler for "Red Christmas"	Won	
2026	Children's and Family Emmy Awards	Outstanding Original Song for a Children's and Young Teen Program	Adam Schmalholz, Thomas Sturges, Antonina Armato and Tim James Price for "Red"	Nominated	

=== Impact ===
In July 2024, the soundtrack for Descendants: The Rise of Red accumulated over 26 million streams across various platforms, while the hashtag "#Descendants" has garnered more than 95 million views in the United States and over 9 billion views globally. The track "Red" gained significant popularity on social media, generating numerous fan choreography covers and dance challenges on platforms like TikTok and Instagram. In October 2024, Frightgeist, which tracks Halloween costume trends in the United States, highlighted the character of Red as one of the top-costume choices for the celebration.

== In other media ==
=== Short film ===
A short film, Shuffle of Love: A Descendants Short Story, featuring the song "Shuffle of Love" from Descendants: The Rise of Red, premiered on Disney+ on February 13, 2025. The short centers on Ruby Rose Turner as Bridget, and includes appearances by Kylie Cantrall and Malia Baker.

=== Prequel book ===
The novel Beyond the Isle of the Lost: Wonderland, fifth book in the series The Isle of the Lost, was published on May 7, 2024, serving as a prequel to the events of the film.

=== Merchandise ===
In early July, Mattel released the "Rise of Red" collection, featuring dolls from Descendants: The Rise of Red, including Brandy's Cinderella, her daughter Princess Chloe, Bridget (the young Queen of Hearts), Uliana (the younger sister of Ursula), and Red (the daughter of the Queen of Hearts). Each doll includes 11 bendable joints and detailed costume recreations from the film. Some of the dolls were out of stock at certain retailers. Mattel also released two special edition The Rise of the Red dolls, Red and Chloe, each accompanied by the Sorcerer's Cookbook featuring three recipes and interactive tools.

== Sequel ==
After the film's release, Suzanne Todd confirmed that Disney is "definitely working on and thinking about a follow-up movie," saying that after the end of The Rise of Red and the consequences of time travel, in the sequel "there will be future good and evil turns for sure."

On February 25, 2025, Disney Branded Television officially greenlit Descendants 5, with Kylie Cantrall, Malia Baker, and Leonardo Nam reprising their roles as Red, Chloe Charming, and Maddox Hatter, respectively. New additions to the cast include Liamani Segura as Pink, Brendon Tremblay as Max Hatter, Alexandro Byrd as Luis Madrigal, and Kiara Romero as Hazel Hook.

The film's official title was revealed as Descendants: Wicked Wonderland on May 6, 2025. On the same day, it was announced that Brandy and Rita Ora would be reprising their roles as Cinderella and the Queen of Hearts, respectively.

The film was released on Disney Channel on July 16, 2026, and on the streaming service Disney+ the following day.
