= Nerd Nite =

Social event

- Nerd Nite Logo
- Formation: 2003
- Founder: Chris Balakrishnan
- Purpose: Educational, Entertainment
- Region served: Worldwide
- Website: https://nerdnite.com/

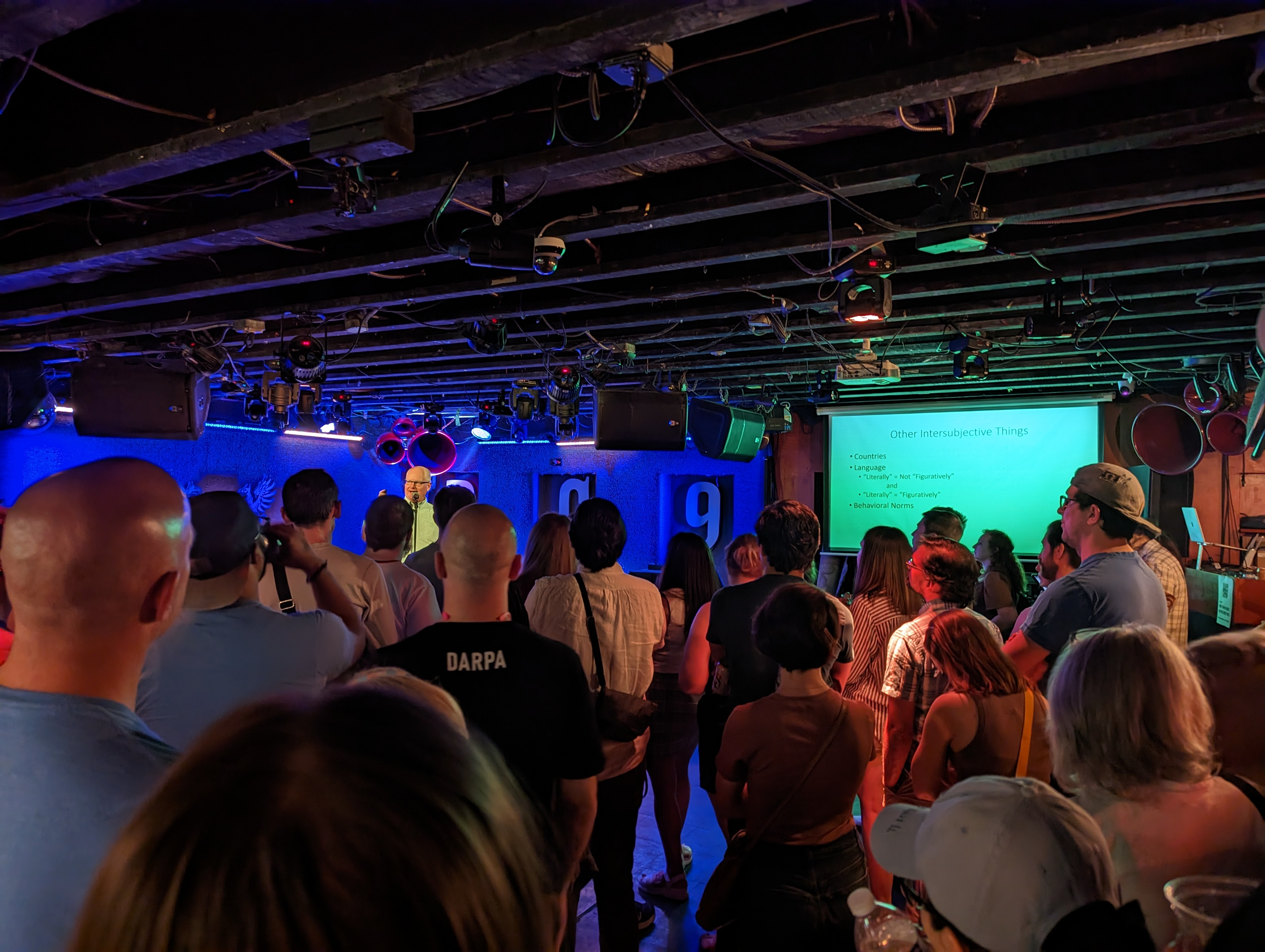
A Nerd Nite event in Washington, D.C., in May 2023

Nerd Nite is an event usually held at a bar or other public venue where usually two or three presenters share about a topic of personal interest or expertise in a fun-yet-intellectual format while the audience shares a drink. It was started in 2003 by then-graduate student (now East Carolina University professor) Chris Balakrishan at the Midway Cafe in the Jamaica Plain neighborhood of Boston. In 2006 Nerd Nite spread to New York City, where Matt Wasowski was tasked with expanding the idea globally. Nerd Nite has been held at more than 100 cities worldwide, including Harare, San Francisco, Wellington, Monrovia, Orlando, Toronto and Madison, Wisconsin. It launched a short-lived Nerd Nite: The Magazine in January 2012 and has also featured an occasional podcast. It has also held "global festivals" and a 2014 event was co-hosted with Smithsonian magazine.

== See also ==
- Café Scientifique
- dorkbot
