= MeeWha Alana Lee =

American actor (born 1958)

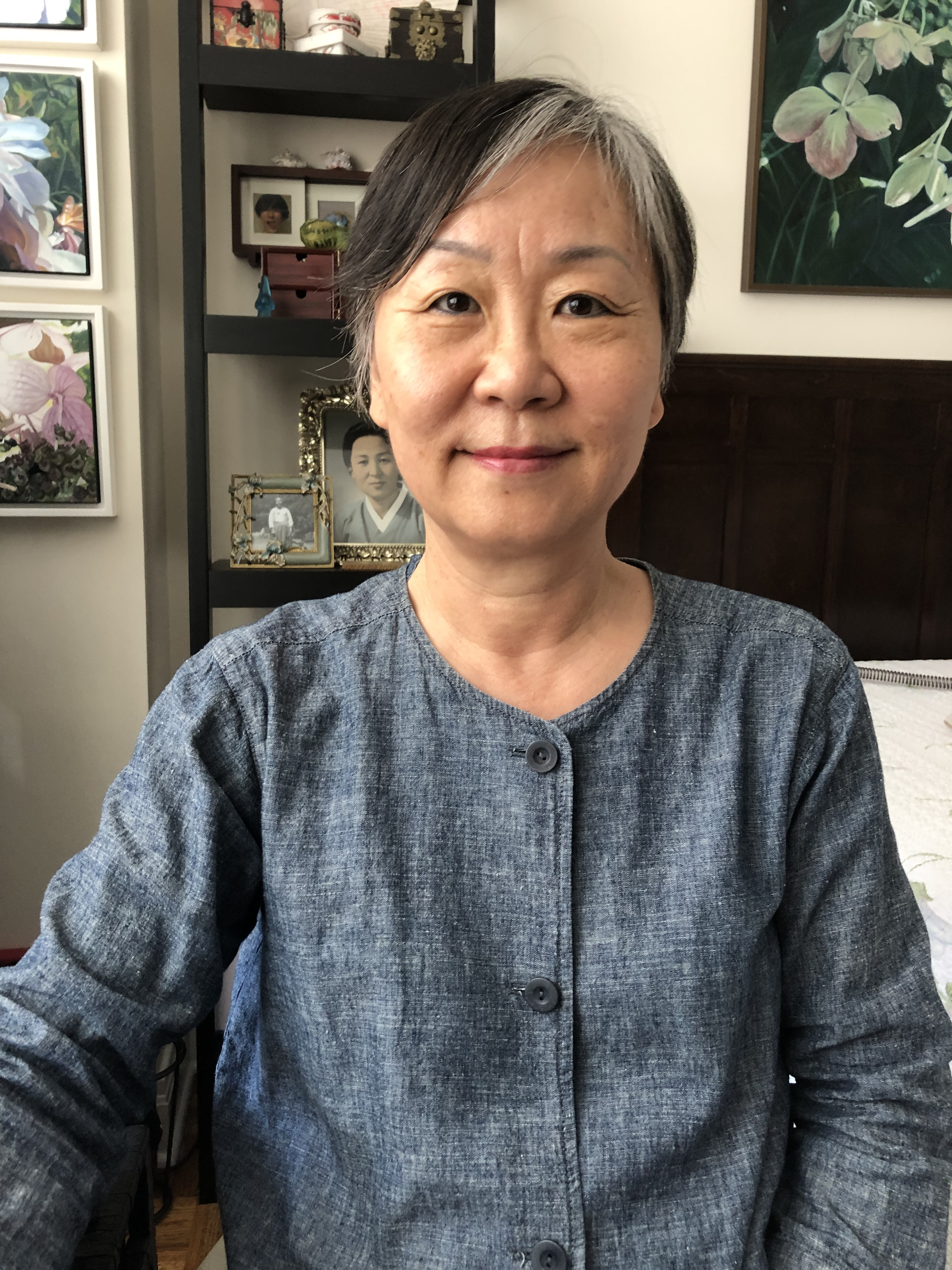
- Lee at home in New York City
- Born: 이미화 (MeeWha Lee); December 31, 1958 (age 67); Masan, South Korea
- Education: Seoul National University; University of Iowa
- Occupations: Actor, designer, painter
- Years active: 2017–present

MeeWha Alana Lee (born December 31, 1958) is an American actress and visual artist. She is best known for her roles in The Chair (2021 TV series) and Umma (2022 film).

== Early life ==
Lee was born in Masan, South Korea. She received her BFA degree from Seoul National University. She moved to the United States in 1982, receiving her MFA degree in Design and Drawing from the University of Iowa.

== Art and design ==
Lee was a college graphic design professor and a brand design strategy executive for three global corporations. Her background in industrial and graphic design allowed her to participate in product and packaging development, which led to many US and global patents.

During and after her time in these careers, she has exhibited her design and studio art internationally. She curated an exhibition of Korean poster design that brought the works of 19 of Korea's leading graphic designers to a global audience and also exhibited and lectured on her own work in brand design. Her paintings have been shown in solo and group exhibitions around the United States and abroad. In 2021, she won the Butler Institute of American Art Award for her oil painting.

== Acting career ==
Lee came to acting late, as a way to honor the memory of her younger son, Alan, a film student who died in 2014.

She gained attention in movies such as Five Stars and on the stage. Her performance as a loving but stern grandmother in Parked in America garnered praise for her portrayal of a "wise advisor" to the main character.

In 2021, she appeared in the Netflix series, The Chair with Sandra Oh, harkening back to her academic career. According to Lee, she was cast in part because Oh wanted her to help "tell the story of academia, immigrants, women and especially women of color."

In 2022, she played the title role in the Sam Raimi film, Umma opposite Sandra Oh and Fivel Stewart. While her performance was lauded, the film was met with mixed reviews, many of which criticized the use of Korean imagery as "other".

Her performance in the 2025 film, G20 (film), garnered praise, being called the "unexpected" or "lowkey" MVP by several critics, while others praised her chemistry with lead Viola Davis or suggested that her character should be given a "sidequel".

== Personal life ==
Having lived in Iowa and Wisconsin for many years, she now resides in New York with her husband, Richard Masters, a coin designer for the US Mint.

== Theater ==
Year	Title	Role	Notes
2017	Twelve Angry Women	Juror #8/Lead	Off-Broadway
2018	Casual Carpool	Grace/Lead	2018 Take Ten Short Play Festival NYC (world premiere)
2020	Shared Ignorance	Sign Changer Bill	
2021	Miguk Saram	HeeWon Kang	
2025	Comfort Women		Staged reading

== Filmography ==
=== Television ===
Year	Title	Role	Notes
2018	Queering	Angela	Episode 2x03: Long Night
2019	Tips	Susan	Television pilot
2019	Awkwafina is Nora from Queens	Korean Grandma #1	Episode 1x02: Atlantic City
2019	The Blessing	Auntie Ruby	Episode 2: "The Aunties"
2020	Ramy	New citizen #2	Episode 2x05: "They"
2020	Parked in America	Halmoni	Television film
2021	The Chair	Grandma 1	Episode 5: "The Last Bus in Town"
2023	A Murder at the End of the World	Ethel	Episode 1x02: "The Silver Doe"

=== Film ===
Year	Title	Role	Notes
2017	Nettles	Hannah	Lead
2018	Don't Kill My Babies!	Acting class patron	
2018	Equal Standard	Officer Lee	
2018	The Butcher	Landlady	
2018	Five Stars	The Korean Woman	Lead
2019	Mirror	Mrs. Cho	
2020	Project Pay Day	Restaurant owner	as MeeWha Lee
2021	Good Egg	Card dealer #2	
2022	All I Want Is Everything	Mrs. Kim	
2022	Umma	Umma	Title character
2021	Good Egg	Card dealer #2	
2023	A Great Divide	Grandma Shim (Halmoni)	
2024	Juk	Grandmother	
2025	G20	First Lady Han Min-Seo	
2025	Meet Cute in Manhattan	Shirley Lin	

=== Music videos ===
Year	Title	Role	Artist
2017	Got Damn	MeeWha	Yyou
2019	Old Mama	Old Mama	Morgane Rondot
2024	Please, Please, Please	Arcade Boss	Sabrina Carpenter
