= Crowned =

Crowned may refer to:

- Senses of "to crown":
  - Having been the object of a coronation
  - Crowning stage of childbirth
- Titled works:
  - Crowned (web series), an American comedy web series
  - Crowned: The Mother of All Pageants, an American TV series

== See also ==
- Crown (disambiguation)
