= Brenna D'Amico =

American actress

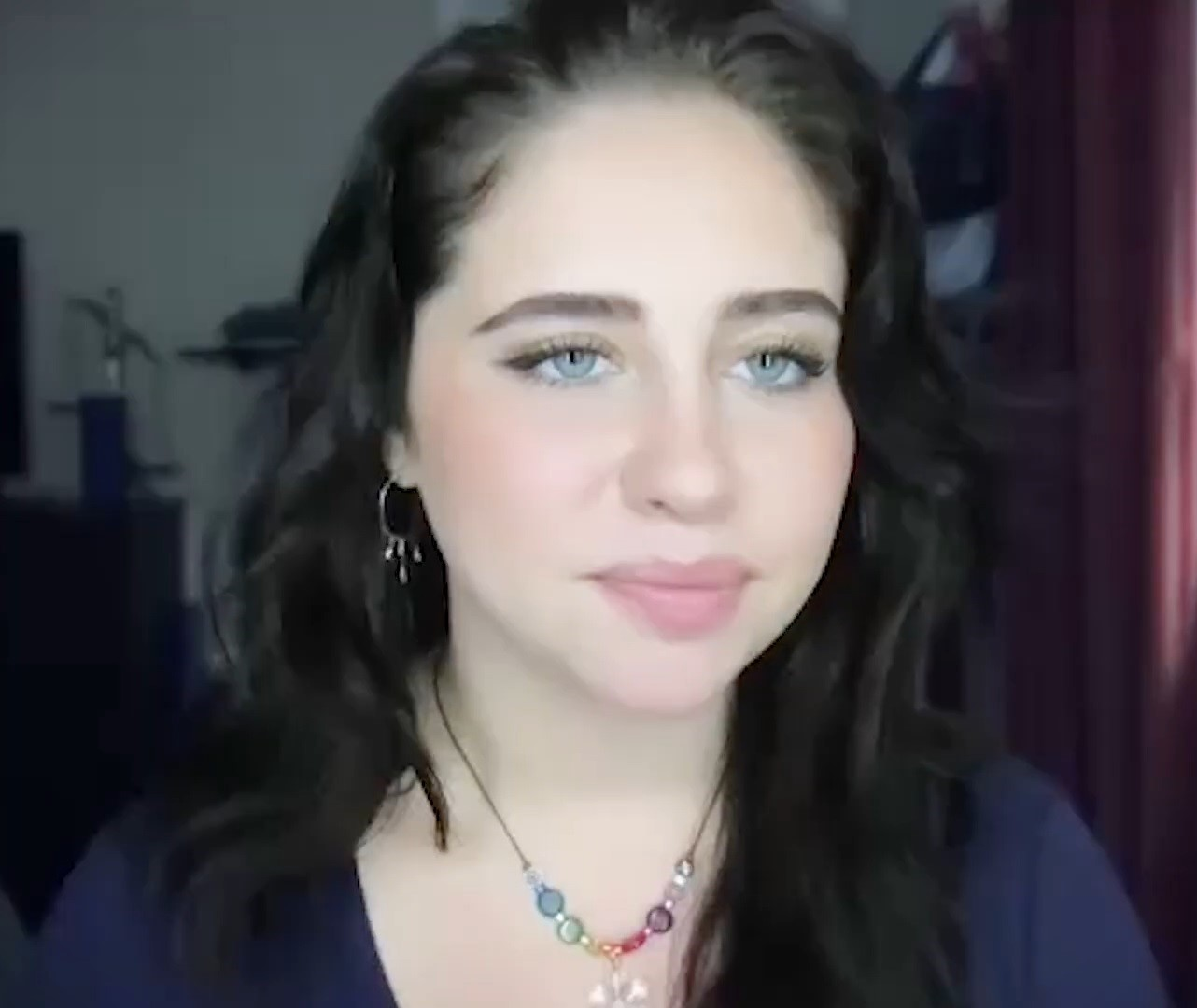
- D'Amico in 2024
- Born: Chicago, Illinois, U.S.
- Occupation: Actress
- Years active: 2015–present

Brenna D'Amico is an American actress best known for her portrayal of Jane, the daughter of the Fairy Godmother, in the Disney Channel Descendants movie franchise.

== Early life ==
D'Amico's hometown is Plainfield, Illinois. She participated in a Chicago-based youth theater program since the age of eight. At age 12, her parents found her a manager and at age 13 she went to Los Angeles and booked her first acting role for Descendants. She moved to Los Angeles at age 16, following the release of the movie.

== Professional career ==
D'Amico made her professional acting debut at the age of 15 in the Disney Channel movie Descendants in 2015, playing the role of Jane, the daughter of the Fairy Godmother. She reprised the role in the animated shorts Descendants: Wicked World and the two movie sequels, Descendants 2 in 2017 and Descendants 3 in 2019.

In 2018, she was cast alongside Johnny Sneed for an ABC comedy pilot, Crazy Wonderful as Vera, but the project has not yet aired since the announcement.

In 2020 D'Amico made her feature film debut in The Never List, starring alongside Fivel Stewart, as Liz, the protagonist's best friend, imagining wild acts they would never do and documenting them in their "Never List".

In 2021 she starred in her first leading role as April Davis in the psychological drama thriller Night Night by director Niki Koss.

In 2022 it was announced that she would star in the upcoming supernatural thriller Burnouts alongside Sierra McCormick, Jade Pettyjohn, Gianni DeCenzo and Bentley Green. Following the release of Night Night, she was also cast for a Tubi original, Crushed as April Davis.

D'Amico will also feature in the upcoming movie Saturday at the Starlight that was announced in 2017 and is currently wrapping up post-production.

D'Amico is represented by A3 artists.

== Filmography ==
=== Film ===
Year	Title	Role	Notes	Ref.
2020	The Never List	Liz	Main role	
2021	Night Night	April Davis	Lead role	
2022	Crushed	Aria Goldman	Main role	
TBA	Saturday at the Starlight	Maya	Post-production	
TBA	Burnouts		In development	

=== Television ===
Year	Title	Role	Notes	Ref.
2015	Descendants: School of Secrets	Jane	Recurring voice role	
2015	Descendants	Jane	Television film	
2015–2017	Descendants: Wicked World	Jane	Main voice role	
2017	Descendants 2	Jane	Television film	
2017	The Middle	Lilah	Episode: "Eyes Wide Open"	
2017–2018	Chicken Girls	Sandy	Recurring role (seasons 1–2)	R
2018	Keys	Brooke		
2018	Overnights	Sandy		
2018	Code Black	Natalie	Episode: "Step Up"	
2019	Descendants 3	Jane	Television film	
2019	Adventures of Dally & Spanky	Addy	Television Film, Lead role	
