= The Extinction of Fireflies =

2021 American LGBTQ+ comedy film

- Theatrical film poster
- Directed by: James Andrew Walsh
- Written by: James Andrew Walsh
- Starring: Michael Urie; Drew Droege; Tracie Bennett; Kario Marcel
- Cinematography: David Zapatka
- Edited by: James Andrew Walsh
- Music by: Dudley Saunders
- Release date: January 15, 2021 (United States)
- Running time: 84 minutes
- Country: United States
- Languages: English; French; Sanskrit

The Extinction of Fireflies is a 2021 American LGBTQ+ comedy film, directed by James Andrew Walsh. The film stars Michael Urie, Drew Droege, Tracie Bennett, and Kario Marcel. It premiered in the United States in 2021.

== Synopsis ==
A modern day gay comedy inspired by the epic romance of Roman Emperor Hadrian and his teenage lover Antinous.

== Cast ==
- Michael Urie as Jay
- Drew Droege as James
- Tracie Bennett as Charlotte
- Kario Marcel as Callisto

== Reception ==
Zachary Wild of The Rectangular View rated the film 1/5 stars, and opined: "Although [the film] is promoted as a comedy, there are no comic moments. I’m not sure if the lack of amusing interactions is due to bad acting and direction or if there actually are no funny moments. I did not laugh or crack a smile once while watching this mess." Glenn Gaylord of The Queer Review rated it 3/5 stars, and commended the acting: "While very much a filmed play, lacking any great cinematic opening up (it was filmed during COVID lockdown after all), I still enjoyed this lighter but still dark variation on Who's Afraid of Virginia Woolf?. What starts out somewhat bitchy and comedic, with Tracie Bennett doing her best Bette Davis by way of Wayland Flowers's Madame, eventually deepens, giving each actor an opportunity to find a certain rawness to this Is that all there is? premise. Michael Urie finds the anger behind his camp facade and Kario Marcel has the perfect flair for a guy who has coasted on his looks but wants more out of life. The real revelation here is Drew Droege, who for years has excelled in comedic roles, getting to really stretch, giving us the deep wells of anger and hurt with his role of a puppet master who can no longer control his strings. There's a sweet tenderness in this film despite its cinematic limitations."
