= List of Descendants: Wicked World episodes =

Descendants: Wicked World (also abbreviated simply as Wicked World) is an animated short-form series based on the Disney Channel Original Movie Descendants. It premiered on September 18, 2015 on the Disney Channel and its digital platforms, including WATCH Disney Channel. It aired two seasons consisting of 33 episodes, and three specials, with its final special airing on March 3, 2017.

== Series overview ==
Season	Episodes	Originally aired	
Season	Episodes	First aired	Last aired
1	18	September 18, 2015	July 15, 2016
2	15	October 21, 2016	February 24, 2017
Specials	3	December 13, 2015	March 3, 2017

== Episode list ==
=== Season 1 (2015–16) Genie Chic & Neon Lights Ball ===
No. overall	No. in season	Title	Directed by	Written by	Original release date	Prod. code	US viewers (millions)
1	1	"Evie's Explosion of Taste"	Aliki Theofilopoulos	Julia Miranda	September 18, 2015	101	2.31
Evie begs Mal to fix the cupcakes she baked for the Heroes and Heroines Festival, but ends up with a total disaster.
2	2	"Mal's Digi-Image Problem"	Aliki Theofilopoulos	Julia Miranda	September 25, 2015	102	N/A
Mal paints a portrait of Audrey in Aurora's dress to make up for the cupcake incident from the previous episode, but Ben advises her to make adjustments upon being concerned for Mal's reputation.
3	3	"Audrey's New Do? New Don't!"	Aliki Theofilopoulos	Julia Miranda	October 2, 2015	103	N/A
Jealous at the attention the villain kids' style are getting, Audrey convinces Jane to use magic and transform her hair into "something really out there" after reminding her that she is the daughter of the Fairy Godmother. Jane then did that and makes it worse.
4	4	"Careful What You Wish For"	Aliki Theofilopoulos	Julia Miranda	October 9, 2015	104	N/A
Evie and Audrey ambush Mal for some magical aid. Having had enough, Mal makes a wish after rubbing Jordan's magic lamp with unforeseen consequences.
5	5	"Voodoo? You Do"	Aliki Theofilopoulos	Julia Miranda	October 16, 2015	105	N/A
On the Isle of the Lost, Mal, Evie, Ben, and Audrey seek refuge in a shop run by Dr. Facilier's daughter Freddie.
6	6	"Lamp Sweet Lamp"	Aliki Theofilopoulos	Julia Miranda	October 23, 2015	106	N/A
Freddie challenges Ben and Audrey into acting evil while Mal wonders how they were transported to the Isle of the Lost.
7	7	"Genie Chic"	Aliki Theofilopoulos	Julia Miranda	November 6, 2015	107	N/A
From inside Jordan's lamp, Freddie decides to stay in Auradon and attend Auradon Prep.
8	8	"Puffed Deliciousness"	Aliki Theofilopoulos	Julia Miranda	November 13, 2015	108	N/A
Freddie has a difficult start at adapting to Auradon's unrotten ways, but she is definitely enjoying the food though.
9	9	"Good is the New Bad"	Aliki Theofilopoulos	Julia Miranda	November 20, 2015	109	N/A
At Auradon's annual singing competition, Mal, Evie, Audrey, Lonnie, Freddie and Ally try to outshine each other but realize they harmonize well together. Song featured: "Good is the New Bad" sung by Dove Cameron as Mal, Sofia Carson as Evie, Sarah Jeffery as Audrey, Dianne Doan as Lonnie, China Anne McClain as Freddie and Jennifer Veal as Ally
10	10	"Spirit Day"	Aliki Theofilopoulos	Julia Miranda	December 4, 2015	110	N/A
It is Spirit Day at Auradon Prep. The day turns rough when Mal accidentally ends up chanting a spell that causes everyone (except Carlos) to act like dogs. So it's now all up to Carlos to recover everyone from the spell.
11	11	"I'm Your Girl"	Aliki Theofilopoulos	Julia Miranda	December 11, 2015	111	N/A
Lonnie has been invited to star in Jordan's web show and Mal and Evie have designed her a glow-in-the-dark outfit for the occasion. Song featured: "I'm Your Girl" heard during Lonnie's talent show performance
12	12	"Mash It Up"	Aliki Theofilopoulos	Julia Miranda	December 13, 2015	112	N/A
The girls are back in Jordan's magic lamp as they discuss the theme for the upcoming dance at Auradon Prep.
13	13	"All Hail the New Q.N.L.B."	Aliki Theofilopoulos	Julia Miranda	July 5, 2016	113	N/A
Evie brags about being elected the new queen of the Neon Lights Ball and Jane reveals her mascot uniform is stolen.
14	14	"Mad for Tea"	Aliki Theofilopoulos	Julia Miranda	July 6, 2016	114	N/A
Despite solving multiple dress problems, Mal and Evie's good intentions backfire when their help further arises suspicion from the AK girls.
15	15	"Carpet Jacked"	Aliki Theofilopoulos	Julia Miranda	July 7, 2016	115	N/A
When Carlos and Jay fail to pick up the girls, Jane create a ride instead.
16	16	"The Night is Young"	Aliki Theofilopoulos	Julia Miranda	July 14, 2016	116	N/A
At the Neon Lights Ball, when someone cuts the cord to the DJ equipment, Freddie decides to rescue the Neon Lights Ball with her own music. Song: "The Night is Young" sung by China Anne McClain as Freddie
17	17	"Neon Lights Out"	Aliki Theofilopoulos	Julia Miranda	July 15, 2016	117	N/A
After Carlos and Jay finally arrive to the Neon Lights Ball and Ben mysteriously disappears, CJ, the daughter of Captain Hook, reveals herself.
18	18	"Hooked on Ben"	Aliki Theofilopoulos	Julia Miranda	July 15, 2016	118	N/A
Mal loses her trust in Freddie when CJ reveals she caused all the trouble at the Neon Lights Ball and that Freddie was the one who sneaked her to Auradon.

=== Season 2 (2016–17) Jewel-Bilee ===
No. overall	No. in season	Title	Directed by	Written by	Original release date	Prod. code	US viewers (millions)
19	1	"Slumber Party"	Eric Fogel	Scott Peterson	October 21, 2016	201	N/A
In the aftermath of the Neon Lights Ball, the girls throw a slumber party and realize they would rather be with each other. Song featured: "Rather Be With You" sung by Dove Cameron as Mal, Sofia Carson as Evie, Sarah Jeffery as Audrey, Brenna D'Amico as Jane, Dianne Doan as Lonnie, Ursula Taherian as Jordan, Lauryn McClain as Freddie and Jennifer Veal as Ally
20	2	"Odd Mal Out"	Eric Fogel	Scott Peterson	October 28, 2016	202	N/A
Mal learns about Auradon's Jewel-Bilee celebration, and why she cannot participate.
21	3	"Pair of Sneakers"	Eric Fogel	Scott Peterson	November 4, 2016	203	N/A
Mal and Freddie return to the Isle of the Lost to find Mal's birthright jewel, but it becomes apparent that they are being watched.
22	4	"Wild Rehearsal"	Eric Fogel	Scott Peterson	November 11, 2016	204	N/A
Mal's new zest for evil causes trouble for the other girls as they make preparations for the Jewel-Bilee.
23	5	"Chemical Reaction"	Eric Fogel	Scott Peterson	November 18, 2016	205	N/A
Mal turns Evie's chemistry experiment into a wicked bubble wardrobe malfunction, leading Evie to suspect that something is wrong with Mal.
24	6	"Talking Heads"	Eric Fogel	Scott Peterson	December 2, 2016	206	N/A
Mal's condition becomes worse when she bewitches her friends. Song featured: "Evil" sung by Dove Cameron as Mal
25	7	"Steal Away"	Eric Fogel	Scott Peterson	December 9, 2016	207	N/A
Evie, Carlos and Jay solve the mystery of Mal's birthright jewel and her change in personality.
26	8	"Evil Among Us"	Eric Fogel	Scott Peterson	January 6, 2017	208	N/A
The Jewel-Bilee is almost here, but while Carlos, Jay, Jane and Freddie are rushing to it, they encounter Zevon, son of Yzma.
27	9	"Options Are Shrinking"	Eric Fogel	Scott Peterson	January 13, 2017	209	N/A
When Carlos, Jay, Jane and Freddie attempt to stop Zevon from taking over Auradon, he shrinks and traps them inside a lamp.
28	10	"Party Crasher"	Eric Fogel	Scott Peterson	January 20, 2017	210	N/A
Audrey's big musical number is ruined when Zevon crashes the Jewel-Bilee and steals the VK's birthright jewels and takes them all!
29	11	"Mal-lone"	Eric Fogel	Scott Peterson	January 27, 2017	211	N/A
Mal and Evie rush to the throne room and witness the mess that Zevon caused, but Audrey is unwilling to work together with Mal after what she did.
30	12	"Trapped"	Eric Fogel	Scott Peterson	February 3, 2017	212	N/A
Ally explains the truth about Mal's birthright jewel and her change in personality to Audrey, and Carlos, Jay, Jane and Freddie attempt to escape Jordan's lamp.
31	13	"Face to Face"	Eric Fogel	Scott Peterson	February 10, 2017	213	N/A
Mal and Evie attempt to stop Zevon when he attempts to use the stolen VK's birthright jewels to take over Auradon.
32	14	"United We Stand"	Eric Fogel	Scott Peterson	February 17, 2017	214	N/A
With the AKs and VKs working together, they are able to defeat Zevon and Mal removes the curse from her birthright jewel.
33	15	"Celebration"	Eric Fogel	Scott Peterson	February 24, 2017	215	N/A
The Jewel-Bilee finally begins, with the VKs being offered their birthright jewels. The AKs and VKs celebrate with a musical number. Song featured: "Better Together" sung by Dove Cameron as Mal, Sofia Carson as Evie, Cameron Boyce as Carlos, Booboo Stewart as Jay, Mitchell Hope as Ben, Sarah Jeffery as Audrey, Brenna D'Amico as Jane, Dianne Doan as Lonnie, Ursula Taherian as Jordan, Lauryn McClain as Freddie and Jennifer Veal as Ally

=== Specials ===
No.	Title	Directed by	Written by	Original release date	Prod. code	US viewers (millions)
1	"Wish Granted"	Aliki Theofilopoulos	Julia Miranda	December 13, 2015	TBA	1.60
All of the first eleven shorts with the exception of "Puffed Deliciousness" are combined into one half-hour special along with the premiere of the short "Mash It Up".
2	"Neon Lights Ball"	Aliki Theofilopoulos	Julia Miranda	July 15, 2016	TBA	1.62
The last seven episodes are combined into one half-hour special. It is almost time for the Neon Lights Ball at Auradon Prep as the students make preparations for it! But when a mysterious figure tries to ruin the evening, it is up to the VKs to find out who is behind all the mischief.
3	"Jewel-Bilee"	Eric Fogel	Scott Peterson	March 3, 2017	TBA	N/A
All 15 episodes of the second season are combined into one half-hour special. The children of Auradon join together with the villain children to prepare for Auradon's "Jewel-Bilee" ceremony.
