= The Never List =

- Directed by: Michelle Mower
- Written by: Ariadne Shaffer
- Produced by: Anna Margarita Albelo
- Starring: Fivel Stewart; Keiko Agena; Andrew Kai; Anna Grace Barlow; Ryan Cargill; Brenna D'Amico; Jonathan Bennett
- Cinematography: Janine Sides
- Music by: Jordan Coffing
- Production company: Never List Productions
- Distributed by: 1091 Pictures
- Release dates: 15 October 2020 (SOHO International Film Festival); 11 December 2020 (US)
- Running time: 102 minutes
- Country: United States
- Language: English

The Never List is a 2020 American coming-of-age drama film directed by Michelle Mower, starring Fivel Stewart, Keiko Agena, Andrew Kai, Anna Grace Barlow, Ryan Cargill, Brenna D'Amico and Jonathan Bennett.

== Cast ==
- Fivel Stewart as Eva Jeffries
- Keiko Agena as Jennifer Jeffries
- Andrew Kai as Joey
- Anna Grace Barlow as Taylor
- Ryan Cargill as Ben Hallster
- Brenna D'Amico as Liz
- Jonathan Bennett as Mr. Snyder
- Matt Corboy as Paul Jeffries
- Tori Keeth as Izzi
- Susan Ziegler as Mrs. Carlton
- Kevin Menkhorst as Chuck
- Drew Droege as Principal Greer
- Sam M. Hall as Dev
- Kimberly Stanphill as Carol Mears
- Booboo Stewart as Lead Singer
- Rob Nagle as Liz's Dad
- Gloria Bigelow as Olivia
- MariNaomi as themselves

== Release ==
The film was released in select theatres on 11 December 2020.

== Plot ==
16-year old Eva (Fivel Stewart), a young overachiever running for student class president, planning a school dance, and dreaming of becoming a comic book artist and her best friend Liz (Brenna D'Amico) have cosplayed their alter egos "Vicky" and "Veronica" since elementary school as a way to release the pressure. Performing highly questionable acts that the real Eva and Liz would never do, documented in their "The Never List". After the sudden death of Liz, Eva decides to honor heir friends memories by completing their secret list of acts they said they would never do. Initially this leads Eva down a road of romance, but at she progresses, her actions begin to threaten her carefully planned life and future.

== Reception ==
Dan Lybarger of the Arkansas Democrat-Gazette wrote that the film's acknowledgement that the "chemical recreation" the characters engage in "sometimes has catastrophic consequences in the real world" keeps the film from becoming a "shallow diversion".

Cary Darling of the Houston Chronicle rated the film 3 stars out of 5 and wrote that "where the film ultimately goes may not be totally unexpected but getting there is an engaging trip."

Barbara Shulgasser-Parker of Common Sense Media rated the film 2 stars out of 5 and wrote that while Stewart is "compelling", she "cannot inject sense into the insensible."

Liam Trump of Film Threat gave the film a score of 2/10 and wrote that the film suffers from a "poor" screenplay and "tepid" direction, and that "any of the potential drawn up by the premise is drowned out by how weak the execution winds up being."
