= Descendants: Wicked World =

- Promotional banner
- Also known as: Wicked World
- Genre: Fantasy; Comedy
- Developed by: Jennifer Magee-Cook; Aliki Theofilopoulos
- Written by: Julia Miranda (season 1); Scott Peterson (season 2)
- Story by: Jennifer Magee-Cook; Aliki Theofilopoulos
- Directed by: Aliki Theofilopoulos (season 1); Eric Fogel (season 2)
- Voices of: Dove Cameron; Sofia Carson; Cameron Boyce; Booboo Stewart; Mitchell Hope; Sarah Jeffery; Brenna D'Amico; Ursula Taherian; China Anne McClain; Lauryn McClain
- Opening theme: "Rotten to the Core" by Sofia Carson
- Ending theme: Better Together
- Composer: Keith Horn
- Countries of origin: United States; Canada
- Original language: English
- No. of seasons: 2
- No. of episodes: 33 (+3 specials) (list of episodes)

Production
- Executive producers: Jennifer Magee-Cook; Aliki Theofilopoulos
- Producer: Jennifer Magee-Cook
- Running time: 2–3 minutes
- Production companies: Bad Angels Productions (Note: A production studio based in Vancouver, Canada.); 5678 Productions; Disney Television Animation

Original release
- Network: Disney Channel
- Release: September 18, 2015 – March 3, 2017

Related
- Descendants: School of Secrets; Descendants; Descendants 2

Descendants: Wicked World is an animated short-form series based on the Disney Channel Original Movie Descendants. It premiered on September 18, 2015, on Disney Channel, taking place in-between the events of the first film and Descendants 2. The series is the first Disney Channel Original Series based on a Disney Channel Original Movie. It picks up after the first film and introduces new characters from the Isle of the Lost and Auradon. Descendants: Wicked World ended on March 3, 2017. It received generally positive reviews from critics.

Providing the voices of the animated characters are Dove Cameron as Mal, Sofia Carson as Evie, Cameron Boyce as Carlos, Booboo Stewart as Jay, Mitchell Hope as Ben, Sarah Jeffery as Audrey, Brenna D'Amico as Jane, Dianne Doan as Lonnie, Ursula Taherian as Jordan, China Anne McClain (first season) and Lauryn McClain (second season) as Freddie, Jennifer Veal as Ally, Myrna Velasco as CJ and Bradley Steven Perry as Zevon.

== Premise ==
After King Ben's coronation in Descendants, the villain kids Mal, Evie, Carlos, and Jay settle in at being good while their villainous parents are still roaming the Isle of the Lost. The story goes deeper at the arrival of new villain kids, Freddie (Dr. Facilier's daughter), CJ (Captain Hook's daughter) and Zevon (Yzma's son).

== Characters ==
=== Villain Kids ===
- Mal (voiced by Dove Cameron) – Daughter of Maleficent and Hades. She possesses dark forms of magic, passed down to her by her mother, but because she is good now, she uses her magic for good purposes.
- Evie (voiced by Sofia Carson) – Daughter of The Evil Queen and Mal's best friend. She has a love of fashion and wields a Magic Mirror that knows everything.
- Carlos (voiced by Cameron Boyce) – Son of Cruella de Vil. He can talk to dogs and has claustrophobia as revealed in "Spirit Day" and "Trapped", respectively.
- Jay (voiced by Booboo Stewart) – Son of Jafar. Despite having chosen to be good, he has a bad habit of stealing.
- Freddie (voiced by China Anne McClain in season 1 and Lauryn McClain in season 2) – Daughter of Dr. Facilier. Despite initially having a difficult to Auradon's unrotten ways, she had no problem adapting to the delicious food. She is the sister of Celia from Descendants 3. Also, she appears in the Descendants novel Return to the Isle of the Lost.
- CJ (voiced by Myrna Velasco) – Daughter of Captain Hook and Freddie's former best friend. She is the sister of Harry Hook from Descendants 2.
- Zevon (voiced by Bradley Steven Perry) – Son of Yzma. In the second season, he plans to fuse the VK's birthright jewels so he can combine their power and take over Auradon.

=== Auradon Kids ===
- Ben (voiced by Mitchell Hope) – Son of Belle and the Beast and Mal's boyfriend. He is the current king of Auradon.
- Audrey (voiced by Sarah Jeffery) – Daughter of Aurora and Prince Phillip. She was initially mistrustful towards the villain kids, especially Mal, but is learning to warm up to their presence.
- Jane (voiced by Brenna D'Amico) – Daughter of The Fairy Godmother. Like Mal, she has magic, but unlike Mal, she has light forms of magic and isn't fully trained in her magic yet.
- Lonnie (voiced by Dianne Doan) – Daughter of Fa Mulan and Li Shang. Unlike Audrey, she is friendly towards the VKs and is willing to help them adapt in Auradon.
- Jordan (voiced by Ursula Taherian) – Daughter of The Genie. She runs a web show and lives in a magic lamp. Also, she appears in the Descendants novel Return to the Isle of the Lost.
- Ally (voiced by Jennifer Veal) – Daughter of Alice. She has the same curious personality as her mother. Also, she appears in the Descendants novel Return to the Isle of the Lost.

== Production ==
The production of the series was announced right after the film Descendants finished airing on Disney Channel. Former Phineas and Ferb storyboard artist Aliki Theofilopoulos Grafft announced on Twitter that she was directing the series, with Jenni Cook as producer, and that the original cast would be reprising their roles. Each episode of the series is going to be under five minutes long.

On July 13, 2016, it was announced the series was renewed for a second season, and that Bradley Steven Perry would be added to the cast as Zevon, the son of Yzma from The Emperor's New Groove, and Lauryn McClain would take over voicing Freddie from her sister China Anne McClain, who was cast as Ursula's daughter Uma in Descendants 2.

== Episodes ==
Season	Episodes	Originally aired	
Season	Episodes	First aired	Last aired
1	18	September 18, 2015	July 15, 2016
2	15	October 21, 2016	February 24, 2017
Specials	3	December 13, 2015	March 3, 2017

== Release ==
Descendants: Wicked World premiered on September 18, 2015 on Disney Channel and its digital platforms, including WATCH Disney Channel. The series was subsequently made available to stream on DisneyNow. It was later released on the Disney+ streaming service.

== Reception ==
=== Viewership ===
In July 2016, it was announced that the first season of Descendants: Wicked World generated over 30 million total viewers in the US and over 100 million engagements on Disney Channel’s app, VOD, and YouTube platforms, since its launch in September 2015.

=== Critical response ===
Emily Ashby of Common Sense Media gave Descendants: Wicked World a grade of three out of five stars, and complimented the depiction of positive messages and role models through the series, writing, "The show illustrates the value of considering a person's actions rather than his reputation before judging him, which is always a good message for kids." Ashley Jones of Romper included Descendants: Wicked World in their "13 Shows For Kids Who Love Princesses" list, stating, "Your princess-loving kids have likely seen one, two, or all three of the Descendants movies on the Disney Channel. If they love the adventures of Evie, Mal, Carlos, and Jay, the spinoff series Descendants: Wicked World is a must-watch. Each episode is an animated short, but they’re packed with plenty of royal content."

=== Accolades ===
Year	Award	Category	Nominee(s)	Result	Ref.
2016	Teen Choice Awards	Choice Animated TV Show	Descendants: Wicked World	Nominated	
