= Umma (2022 film) =

2022 American horror film

- Theatrical release poster
- Directed by: Iris K. Shim
- Written by: Iris K. Shim
- Produced by: Sam Raimi; Zainab Azizi
- Starring: Sandra Oh; Fivel Stewart; Dermot Mulroney; Odeya Rush; MeeWha Alana Lee; Tom Yi
- Cinematography: Matt Flannery
- Edited by: Louis Cioffi; Kevin Greutert
- Music by: Roque Baños
- Production companies: Stage 6 Films; Raimi Productions; Starlight Media
- Distributed by: Sony Pictures Releasing
- Release dates: March 15, 2022 (Koreatown); March 18, 2022 (United States)
- Running time: 83 minutes
- Country: United States
- Languages: English; Korean
- Box office: $2.3 million

Umma (Note: The word "Umma" means "Mom" in Korean.) (Korean: 엄마; RR: Eomma) is a 2022 American supernatural horror film written and directed by Iris K. Shim. The film stars Sandra Oh, Fivel Stewart, MeeWha Alana Lee, Tom Yi, Odeya Rush, and Dermot Mulroney. Sam Raimi serves as a producer on the film. The film follows Amanda (Oh), a single mother who lives with her daughter in an isolated farm being haunted by her mother's ghost.

Umma was released in the United States on March 18, 2022, by Sony Pictures Releasing. The film received mixed reviews from critics, who praised Oh's performance and the film's themes, but criticized its clichéd formulas, its screenplay, its over-reliance on jump scares, and its lack of tension.

== Plot ==
Korean immigrant Amanda and her homeschooled daughter Chrissy "Amani" live on a rural farm, raising bees, selling honey, raising chickens, and living without modern technology as Amanda has an "allergic reaction" to electronics and electricity. She is upset to learn that Chrissy wants to leave the farm in order to pursue college. When Amanda receives the cremated ashes of her recently deceased estranged mother, or Umma, in a suitcase from her uncle Mr. Kang visiting her from Korea, she is confronted with memories of her abusive childhood.

Umma had been left to raise Amanda alone in the United States, unable to speak English and surrounded by those who did not understand or practice her culture. It is revealed that Amanda fabricated her "allergy" to electronics after being electrically shocked multiple times by Umma as punishment. When Amanda cut ties with her mother she also cut ties with her Korean heritage as a whole, including giving up her family name. As Mr. Kang left, he shamed Amanda for abandoning her own mother and heritage, and for not teaching Chrissy Korean language and culture.

Soon after the ashes arrive a vicious spirit appears, intent on claiming Amanda's body for itself. As the supernatural phenomena following the delivery of her mother's ashes progress, from visions of tormented Korean spirits (including Umma's spirit) to an encounter with a kumiho that was eating her chickens, Amanda suddenly becomes more paranoid and fearful that she is slowly becoming her own mother. This fear becomes realized when Umma successfully possesses her daughter when Amanda tries to bury the ashes.

Chrissy finds her mother performing the Jesa and wearing a mask and hanbok. She is attacked by Amanda, but manages to avoid being killed after pleading for her life. Amanda decides to confront her mother. She forgives her for the abuse. Amanda acknowledges that it was unfair that Umma had been expected to raise a child all alone in a country far from home and in her circumstances, but that it was not an excuse for the abuse. This compassion and understanding allows Umma to finally move on and be at peace, as she had also come to understand that what she did to Amanda was unfair. The film ends with Amanda rediscovering her family heritage and sharing it with her daughter, as well as coming to terms with Chrissy's need to live her own life.

== Cast ==
- Sandra Oh as Amanda
- Fivel Stewart as Chrissy
- Dermot Mulroney as Danny
- Odeya Rush as River
- MeeWha Alana Lee as Park Soon-yi (Korean: 박순이; RR: Bag Sun-i), Amanda's mother (Umma)
- Tom Yi as Mr. Kang, Amanda's uncle

== Production ==
In January 2020, it was announced that Sandra Oh had joined the cast of the film, with Iris K. Shim directing from a screenplay she wrote and with Sam Raimi and Zainab Azizi producing under the Raimi Productions banner. Originally filming was set to begin in Vancouver in April 2020, but production was shut down because of the COVID-19 pandemic. In October 2020, Fivel Stewart, Dermot Mulroney, Odeya Rush, MeeWha Alana Lee and Tom Yi joined the cast of the film, with Stage 6 Films set to produce and Sony Pictures Releasing distributing. Filming eventually began on October 7, 2020, in Los Angeles, California, and wrapped in January 2021.

== Release ==
Umma was released on March 18, 2022. The film's premiere took place in Koreatown in Los Angeles on March 15, 2022.

=== Home media ===
The film was released digitally on April 9, 2022, and was given a DVD and Blu-ray release date of May 24, 2022 by Sony Pictures Home Entertainment. The movie was added to Netflix in the United States on July 16, 2022.

== Reception ==
=== Box office ===
In the United States and Canada, Umma was released alongside Jujutsu Kaisen 0, The Outfit, and X, and was projected to gross $500,000–1.5 million from 805 theaters in its opening weekend. The film earned $915,290 in its opening weekend, finishing eleventh. Women made up 57% of the audience during its opening, with those in the age range of 18–34 comprising 61% of ticket sales. The ethnic breakdown of the audience showed that 42% were Caucasian, 19% Hispanic and Latino Americans, 18% African American, 17% Asian, and 4% other. The film dropped out of the box office top ten in its second weekend, finishing fourteenth with $460,068.

=== Critical response ===
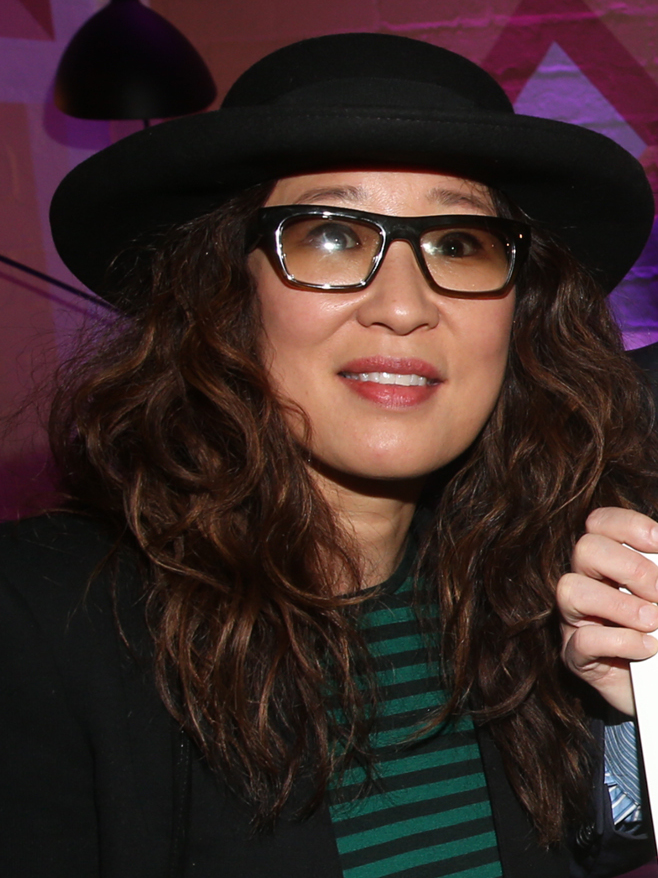
Despite its mixed reviews, Sandra Oh received praise for her performance in the film.

On the review aggregator website Rotten Tomatoes, 32% of 41 critics' reviews are positive, with an average rating of 5/10. The website's consensus reads: "Despite Sandra Oh's typically strong performance and glimmers of potential from writer-director Iris K. Shim, Umma is a cliché-ridden missed opportunity." Metacritic, which uses a weighted average, assigned the film a score of 51 out of 100, based on 13 critics, indicating "mixed or average" reviews. Audiences polled by PostTrak gave the film a 52% positive score, which Deadline Hollywood described as "awful."

Laura Sirikul from IGN gave a score of 4 out of 10, praising its themes and Oh's performance but criticizing its poor execution and cliches, stating, "Umma isn’t scary, but the themes behind it are terrifying as it deals with generational trauma and guilt. Though the cultural references run deep, it’s overstuffed with symbolic imagery that is never fully explained. Though Oh and Stewart give solid performances, the tone and tension of the story ends up being choppy and underwhelming." Andrew Baker from Variety wrote: "Oh aces her leading role with customary aplomb, and Stewart makes for a game scene partner, but Shim’s economical-to-a-fault screenplay rarely allows them enough downtime to fully flesh out their characters."

Frank Scheck at The Hollywood Reporter noted Oh's committed performance but found the film to be a mediocre B-movie, writing: "Writer-director Shin's labored attempts to use genre tropes to explore the complexities of domineering mother-daughter relationships never fully develops." Frank Hoepfner from The Wrap wrote: "The most frightening part of Umma is not the ghostly apparition of Amanda’s mother, but Amanda herself. Under Shim’s direction, Oh’s Amanda is haunted and taut, an unpredictable force of nature." Kate Erbland from IndieWire also gave a mixed review and wrote: "Despite its flaws, Umma is an impressive debut for Shim, the kind of outing that hints at plenty more under the hood or tucked inside a massive suitcase, just bursting with secrets."

In a positive review, Tracy Brown from Los Angeles Times wrote: "Think more classic Gothic horror than ghastly over-the-top occult. But that’s plenty to keep viewers such as me, who frighten easily, on edge as the story progresses."
