= Aliki Theofilopoulos =

American animator

- Born: Aliki Theofilopoulos; La Jolla, California, U.S.
- Other names: Aliki Theofilopoulos-Kiriakou, Aliki Kiriakou, Aliki Grafft
- Occupations: Animator, television writer, producer, lyricist, voice actress
- Years active: 1995–present
- Known for: Phineas and Ferb; Descendants: Wicked World
- Spouses: Baron Grafft (m. 2006; div. 2014) Emanuel Kiriakou (m. 2020)
- Children: 2

Aliki Theofilopoulos Kiriakou is an American animator, producer, director and writer. She is well-known for her work on television series Phineas and Ferb and Descendants: Wicked World. She began her career on Disney films such as Hercules, Mulan, Fantasia 2000 and many more.

== Biography ==
Theofilopoulos was born in La Jolla, California and raised in San Diego. She attended the University of Southern California and shortly after graduation, moved to Los Angeles.

== Filmography ==
- Hercules (1997), animator
- Tarzan (1999), animator
- Fantasia 2000 (1999), animator
- Atlantis: The Lost Empire (2001), animator
- Treasure Planet (2002), animator
- ChalkZone (2002–2004), storyboard revisionist, character designer, clean up artist
- Home on the Range (2004), animator
- Superior Defender Gundam Force (2004), voice actress (Zero, Bell Wood, Zakos)
- Catscratch (2005), character designer
- Random! Cartoons (2007), creator (Yaki & Yumi, Girls on the Go!), voice actress (Sweet Little Girl, Fortune Fish, Kid #1, Kelly, Mrs. Dusenberry, Crimson), voice director, co-producer, writer, storyboard artist, character designer
- Phineas and Ferb (2008–2014), voice actress (Mandy), storyboard artist, writer
- Doctor Lollipop (2013), director
- Descendants: Wicked World (2015), director
- Harvey Girls Forever! (2018–2020), supervising producer, director, voice actress (Chloe Claireson)
- Doug Unplugs (2020–2022), executive producer
- Dew Drop Diaries (2023), executive producer
- Zombies: The Re-Animated Series (2024), developer, writer, executive producer
