= Drew Droege =

American actor

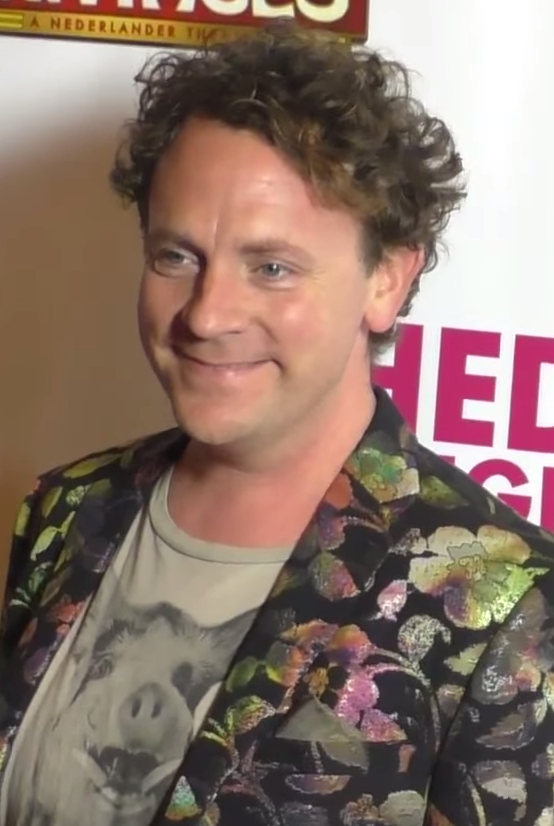
- Droege in 2016
- Born: Andrew Gerhardt Droege; February 9, 1977 (age 49); Columbia, South Carolina, U.S.
- Education: Lincolnton High School; Wake Forest University
- Occupations: Actor; comedian; writer; director
- Years active: 1995–present

Andrew Gerhardt Droege (pronounced /ˈdroʊɡi/; born February 9, 1977) is an American actor, comedian, writer, and director, known for his improv work and for a series of online impressions of Chloë Sevigny that went viral.

== Early life and education ==
Droege was born in Columbia, South Carolina and raised in Lincolnton, North Carolina, where he attended and graduated from Lincolnton High School. He was raised a Presbyterian. Droege went on to study Theatre and English at Wake Forest University in Winston-Salem, North Carolina, where he obtained a BA. Following college graduation, Droege moved to Los Angeles and started studying with The Groundlings.

== Career ==
=== Television and film ===
Droege has appeared on television in Hot in Cleveland, Key & Peele, Bob's Burgers, How I Met Your Mother, Up All Night, New Girl, NTSF:SD:SUV::, Jon Benjamin Has a Van, Glory Daze, The Sarah Silverman Program, Kroll Show, Nick Swardson's Pretend Time, Halfway Home, Reno 911! and Campus Ladies and on film in Sassy Pants, Eating Out 4: Drama Camp and Big Gay Love.

Droege appears as John Dumé in the 2024 feature film Queer.

=== Live performance ===
Droege performed in the March 2012 edition of Don't Tell My Mother, a monthly showcase event in which authors, screenwriters, actors, and comedians share true stories they would never want their mothers to know. He has directed several sketch comedy shows and Jersey Shoresical: A Frickin' Rock Opera (winner, Best Ensemble, NY International Fringe Festival 2011) in Los Angeles.

He wrote several off-Broadway shows, including "Bright Colors and Bold Patterns" (2016), "Happy Birthday Doug" (2020) and "Messy White Gays" (2025, a variation on the 1948 Alfred Hitchcock film Rope).

In 2017, Droege was in the original cast of the jukebox musical Titanique in Los Angeles. In 2023, he joined the off-Broadway cast of the show as Ruth in New York City.

Droege was a member of improvisational comedy troupe The Groundlings Sunday Company, where he currently performs and teaches. He also performs regularly at the Upright Citizens Brigade Theatre and plays a leading role in UCB's breakdancing movie musical, Freak Dance.

=== Web series ===
Droege's Chloë Sevigny impression videos have been featured on PerezHilton.com, EW.com, The Huffington Post and The New York Post, and were called "compulsively watchable" by The Advocate.

In 2012 and 2013, Droege appeared in the comedy series Romantic Encounters and the interview series All Growz Up, both opposite Melinda Hill. Droege also starred in Crowned.

=== Other work ===
Droege's Earwolf podcast, Glitter in the Garbage, was deemed "Brilliant and Lowbrow" by New York magazine's Approval Matrix.

As a writer, Droege has contributed to OUT magazine, Logo's New Now Next Awards, E!'s Fashion Police, and Funny Or Die's Billy on the Street.

Droege portrays Walt Disney in the short film Boop opposite Rose McGowan.

=== Awards ===
In 2010, Droege was given Outfest Film Festival's Special Programming Award For Emerging Talent. In 2011, he was named one of Out magazine's OUT 100. In 2012, LA Weekly cited Droege as one of Los Angeles' Top 10 Comedy Acts To Watch. In 2017, Droege won an Indie Series Award for Best Guest Actor (Comedy) for his performance as Dewey in the web series #Adulting.

== Filmography ==
Year	Work	Role	Notes
1995	Glory Daze	Bruce	
2002	Romeo and Juliet Revisited	Benvolio	
2002	The Journey	Guy in Coffee Shop	
2003	Killing the Dream	John Colburt	
2003	Scream Bloody Murder	Beaumont	
2005	The 70s House	Disco Drill Sergeant	
2005	Reno 911!	Governor's Assistant	
2006	Kill House	Detective Kirk	
2006	Pro-Choice	Camper	
2007	Halfway Home	Jeremy	
2007	Derek and Simon: The Show	Surprise Guest	
2008	King Country	Charlie	
2009	Kicking Sand in Your Face	Bad Comedian	
2009	Yoga Man	Erich Sun	
2009	The Lone Wolf	Bully No. 2	
2009	Milk	Dad No. 1	
2009	Coco Lipshitz: Behind the Laughter	Raoul Lupenstein	
2010	Wish Makers of West Hollywood	Jake	
2010	The Sarah Silverman Program	Seth	
2010	Freak Dance	Dazzle	
2010	Glory Daze	Bruce	
2011	Eating Out 4: Drama Camp	Dick Dickey	
2011	Jon Benjamin Has a Van	Gay Driver	
2011	Boop	Walt Disney	
2011	The Zombie Whisperer	Xander Xaxs	
2011	Pretend Time	Man in Audience	
2011	How I Met Your Mother	Waiter	
2011	New Girl	Restaurant Manager	
2011–2014	Stallions de Amor	Merlinda Stallion	
2011–2012	Up All Night	Driver / Manic Man-Day Singer	
2012	Key & Peele	Maitre D	
2012	Hot in Cleveland	Stage Manager	
2012	Sassy Pants	Michael Paul	
2012	Baby Daddy	Simon	
2012	Waffle Hut	Teresa	
2012	Redeeming Dave	James	
2013	Romantic Encounters		Web series
2013	All Growz Up	Self	
2013	Crowned	Rori	Web series
2013	Ass Backwards	Homeless Norma	
2013	House of Lies	Albert	
2013	Happy Endings	Josh Jill	Episode: "The Ballad of Lon Sarofsky"
2013	We Are Animals	George	
2013	NTSF:SD:SUV::	Chad	
2013	Burning Love	Cyrano Cruze-Shippe	
2014	Sean Saves the World	Jason	
2014	Chozen	(voice)	
2014	Comedy Bang! Bang!	Guy Balfour	
2014	2 Broke Girls	Gay Jim	
2014	Kroll Show	Terrence	
2014	Where the Bears Are	Oscar Butterfield	Web series/6 episodes
2014	Go-Go Boy Interrupted	Ann Ziety	Web series
2014	Such Good People	Clay Hampton	Film
2014–2015	Drunk History	Himself	2 episodes
2015	Scouts Guide to the Zombie Apocalypse	Drunk Man	
2015–2025	Bob's Burgers	Deirdre, Adrian, Donovan, Eve (voice)	Episodes: "Eat, Spray, Linda," "The Hormone-iums," "All That Gene", "The Place Beyond the Pinecones"
2016	Transparent	Drag Natalie	
2016	Bajillion Dollar Propertie$	Grimsley	Episode: "Spiritual Gurus"
2016	#Adulting	Dewey	Web series – Episode: "Pictures of Posteriors"
2016	Life in Pieces	Chris Joestalli	Episode: "Window Vanity Dress Grace"
2017	The Circle	Improv Actor	
2017	Idiotsitter	Timothy	
2017	Nobodies	Host	
2018	Ideal Home	Drew	
2018	Heathers	Maurice Dennis	Recurring role
2018	Cadette in Charge	Scientist Scott (voice)	Pilot
2018	Liza on Demand	Sebastian Foyeé	Episode: "Elite Status"
2019	Now Apocalypse	Casting Director	
2020	Battletoads	Pia (voice)	Video game
2020	The Never List	Principal Greer	
2020–2021	Search Party	Ashley	
2021	Bless the Harts	Julian (voice)	Episode: "Hot Tub-tation"
2021–2023	The Great North	Matthew / Cal (voice)	2 episodes
2021	Q-Force	(voice)	
2022	The Goldbergs	Randall	
2022	Me Time	Combover Stew	
2023	Your Honor	Gary the Tailor	
2023	Fool's Paradise	Male Hairdresser	
2024	Queer	John Dumé	
2025	Fireflies in the Dusk	Martin	Short film
2026	Stop! That! Train!	Rich Gay	
