= Crowned (web series) =

- Genre: Comedy
- Created by: Josh Bednarsky, Brianne Sanborn
- Directed by: Josh Bednarsky
- Starring: Brianne Sanborn, Veronica Mannion, Josh Bednarsky
- Country of origin: United States
- Original language: English

Production
- Producer: Usher Morgan
- Production locations: Los Angeles, California
- Running time: 5-10 minutes

Original release
- Network: YouTube
- Release: August 15 – September 20, 2013

Crowned is an American comedy web series created by Josh Bednarsky and his wife Brianne Sanborn, who also wrote, directed and star in the episodes. The show follows Macie Edwards, an unemployed actress who, in a desperate effort to keep her apartment and pay her cat's medical bills takes a job as a Party Princess in North Hollywood, CA. The series depicts the everyday routine of party princesses in the fictional Crowned Entertainment Company. Most of the show follows a standard narrative style but often cuts to interviews with the employees of the fictional corporation to simulate the look of a documentary.

== Premiere and recognition ==
The first episode premiered at a private event in Los Angeles, CA. The show became available on YouTube and the show's website on August 15, 2013, with some episodes surpassing 100,000 views. The show's 2nd season has yet to be announced. Film Threat gave the show 3 out of 5 stars, film critic Mark Bell wrote "it’s an entertaining series, and it ends on a bit of a cliffhanger setting up some potentially fun dynamics for next season."

== Production ==
The series stars comedian Drew Droege, Megan Heyn (Browsers, Freak Dance) and Veronica Mannion. The show was co-produced by Usher Morgan who also supervised the post production process. Before Morgan's involvement, the show had a successful Crowdfunding campaign and the producers raised the funds needed for principal photography. The series soundtrack includes songs from the British IBM.
