= Fivel Stewart =

American actress (born 1996)

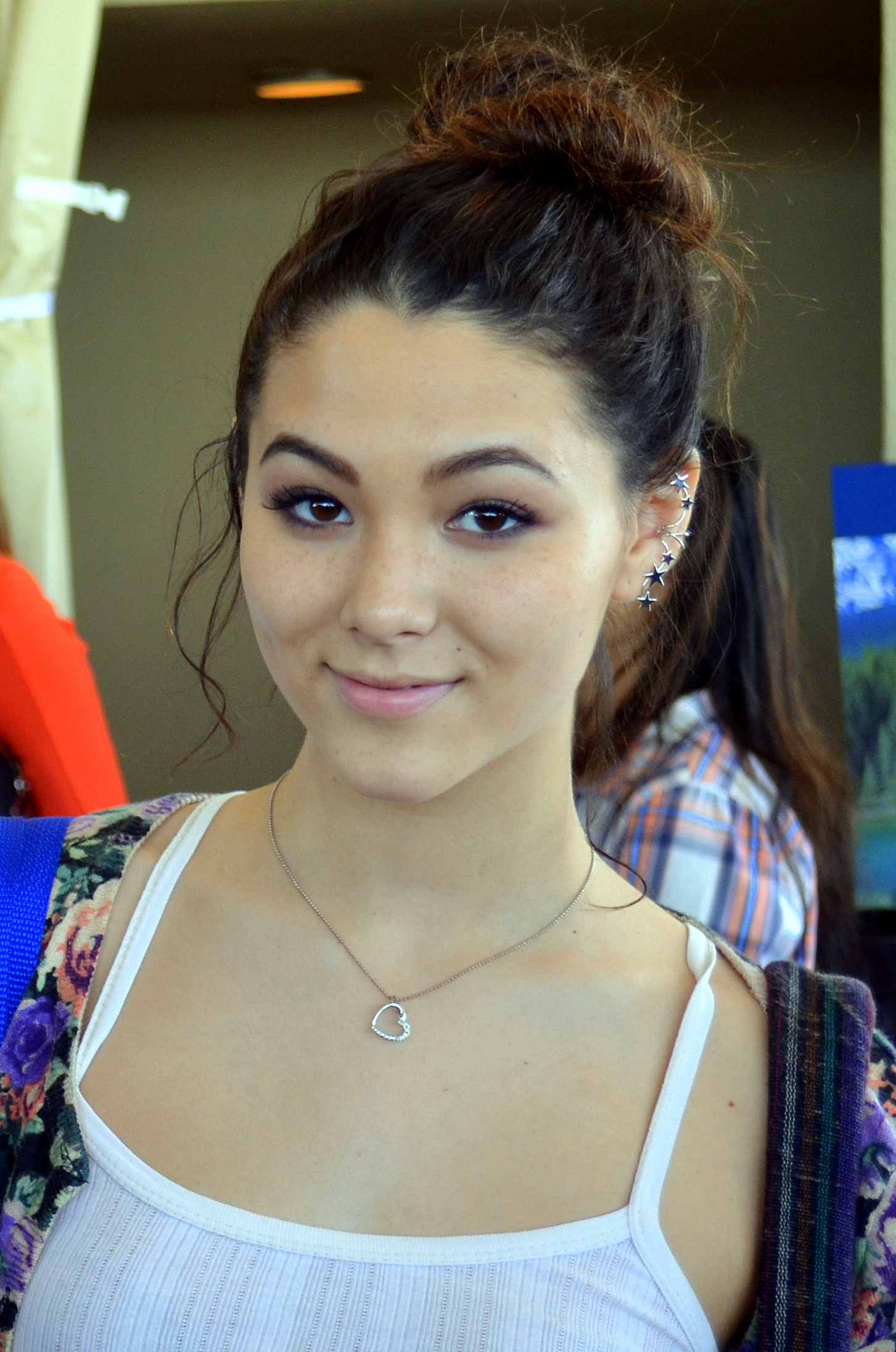
- Fivel Stewart at a pre-Oscars event held at the L'Ermitage Hotel in Beverly Hills, California, February 2012
- Born: Trente Heavyn Stewart; November 4, 1996 (age 29); Beverly Hills, California, U.S.
- Occupations: Actor; singer
- Years active: 2001–present
- Relatives: Booboo Stewart (brother)

Trente Heavyn "Fivel" Stewart (born November 4, 1996) is an American actress and singer who first came to attention in her main cast role as Izzie in three seasons of the Netflix series Atypical (2018–2021). As of 2023, she is in the main cast of the Netflix series The Recruit and the Fox series Alert: Missing Persons Unit.

== Early life ==
Fivel Stewart was born in Beverly Hills, California and grew up largely on a ranch. Her father, Nils Allen Stewart, is a professional stuntman. She is the younger sister of Booboo Stewart who also acts, and Maegan Stewart, who acts and is a stuntwoman. Fivel performed with Booboo and Maegan as part of "TSC" (The Stewart Clan). Her mother is of Japanese, Korean, and Chinese descent while her father is of Scottish, Russian, and Native American descent.

== Career ==
Fivel Stewart has worked in the entertainment industry since the age of seven. She was the lead singer of the band My Allowance and she toured with Demi Lovato, Menudo, and Mitchel Musso. Stewart was the lead vocalist in the band 5L, accompanied by Booboo Stewart who plays the guitar. She began martial arts training in karate when she was five. At six, she began competing and was a 2002 and 2003 World Champion in martial arts. She was inducted into the Black Belt Junior Hall of Fame in 2003. She has worked with her father, stunt coordinator Nils Allen Stewart, on his projects, learning how to rig and perform fire stunts.

Fivel Stewart played the role of Izzie Taylor in the last three seasons of Atypical, on Netflix from 2017 to 2021. In 2022, she joined the cast of Umma, playing Sandra Oh's daughter Chrissy. In 2023, Stewart was attached to the action thriller Bellmount, which did not proceed to production. She appeared in the lead role and was an executive producer, for the 2024 film Wake.

== Filmography ==
Television roles
Year	Title	Role	Notes
2004	The O. C.	Little girl asking for comic	Episode: "The Avengers"
2004–2006	Dante's Cove	Betty	Recurring role (seasons 1–2)
2016	Lab Rats: Elite Force	Reese	Episode: "The Attack"
2018	T@gged	Jai	Main cast (season 3), web series
2018–2021	Atypical	Izzie Taylor	Recurring role (seasons 2–4)
2020	Close Up	Rachel	Television film
2022	Roar	Jane	Episode: "The Girl Who Loved Horses", anthology series
2022–2025	The Recruit	Hannah	Main cast
2023–2025	Alert: Missing Persons Unit	Sidney Grant	Recurring role (season 1), guest appearances (4 episodes, seasons 2–3)

Film roles
Year	Title	Role	Notes
2004	Yard Sale	Chrissy Deavers	
2005	Pit Fighter	Lucinda	
2013	Hansel & Gretel: Warriors of Witchcraft	Ella	
2019	The Haunting of Sharon Tate	Patricia "Yellow" Krenwinkel	
2020	The Never List	Eva Jeffries	
2022	Umma	Chrissy	
2023	The Adventures of Tikki the Wonder Dog	Abbey	
2024	The Windigo	Bree	
2024	Wake	Lake	

Music videos
Year	Title	Artist(s)	Role	Ref.
2021	"Summerland"	half•alive	Rorey Roberts	
