= Faking It season 2 =

Faking It
- Season 2
- Promotional poster and DVD cover art for both parts
- No. of episodes: 20

Release
- Original network: MTV
- Original release: September 23, 2014 – November 2, 2015

Season chronology
- ← Previous; Season 1 Next → Season 3

The second season of Faking It, an American single-camera romantic comedy, premiered on September 23, 2014, and concluded on November 2, 2015, on the MTV network. In June 2014, the series was renewed for a second season of 10 episodes, which was later expanded to 20 episodes.

== Plot ==
=== Part 1 ===
In the aftermath of the first-season finale, the gang has to deal with the consequences of their choices. Karma (Katie Stevens) finds out Amy (Rita Volk) and Liam (Gregg Sulkin) slept together and starts having trust issues with both of them. Lauren (Bailey De Young) has her secret about being intersex exposed. Shane (Michael Willett) finds himself a new boyfriend—Duke (Skyler Maxon)—and Amy tries to figure out her sexuality while she tries to push her feelings for Karma away.

=== Part 2 ===
After being locked up for drug dealing, Karma's family is having financial problems and have to rent their house to Felix (Parker Mack), the new guy in school. Liam promised his dad to give up art and started an internship at his family's company, along with Zita (Chloe Bridges), whom he befriends. After Shane outs him as gay, Duke and Shane fight and they break up. Amy tries to spend more time with her dad while she's still unsure about her feelings for Karma.

== Cast and characters ==
=== Main cast ===
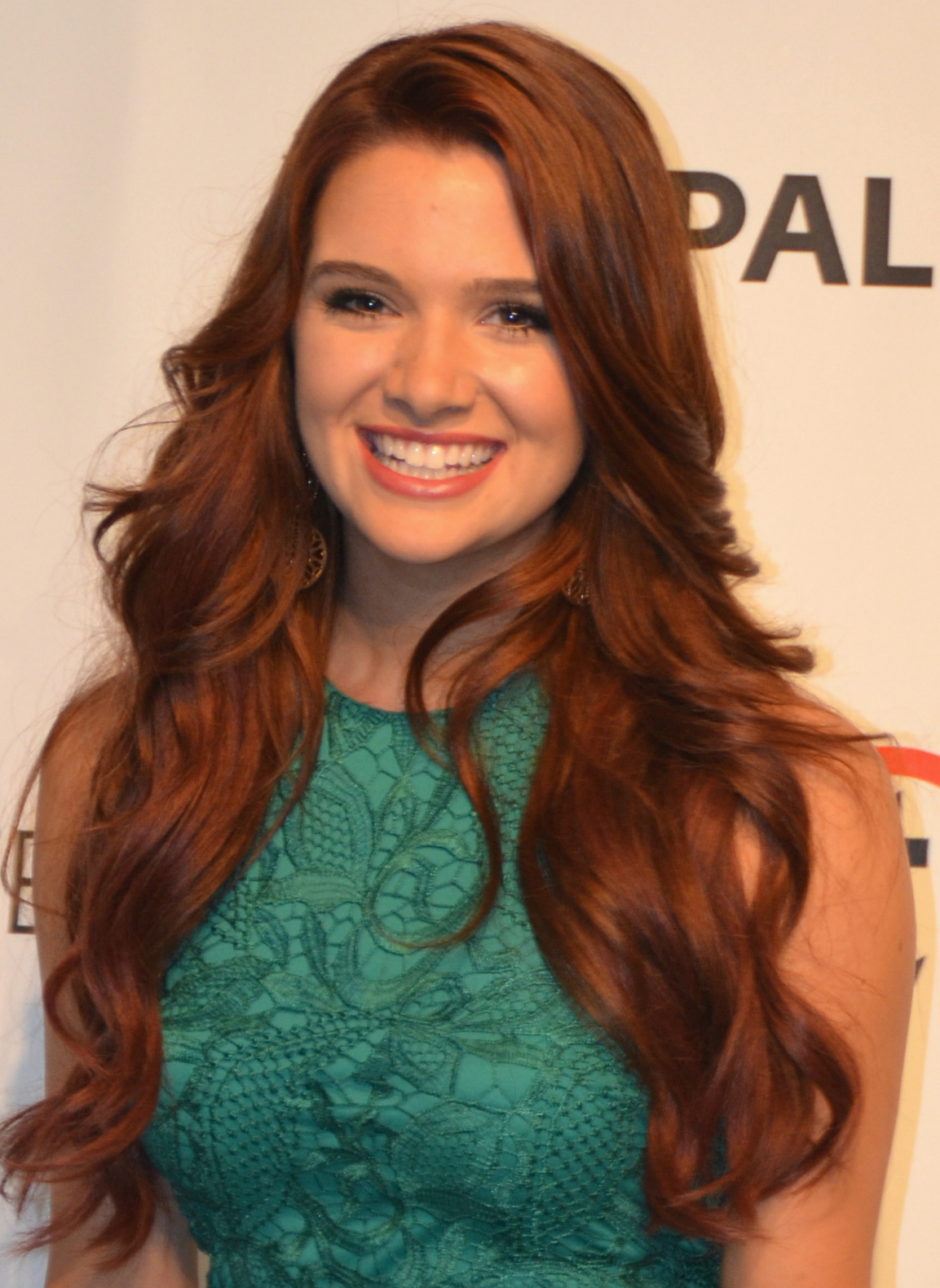
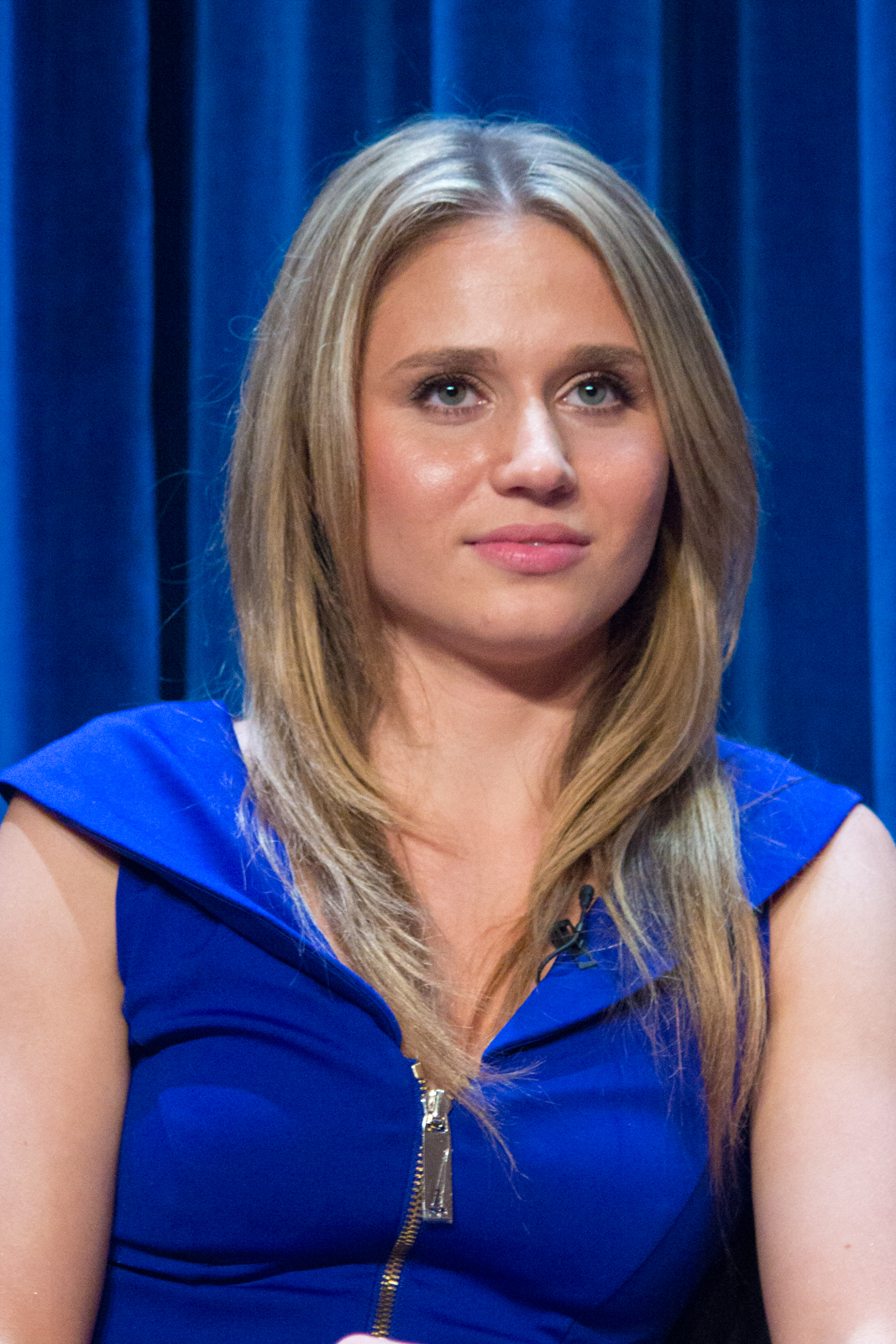
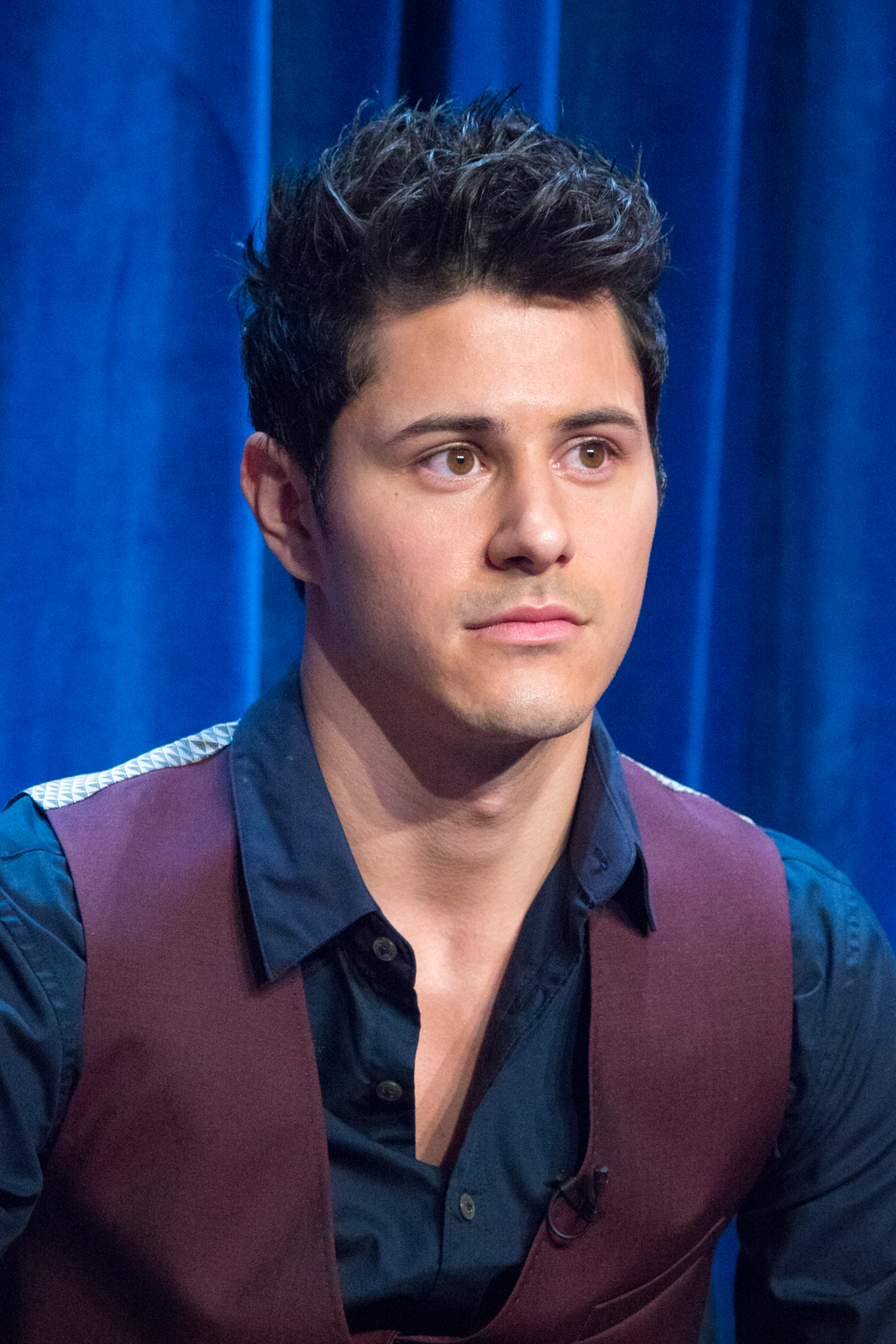
Katie Stevens, Rita Volk and Michael Willett (left to right).
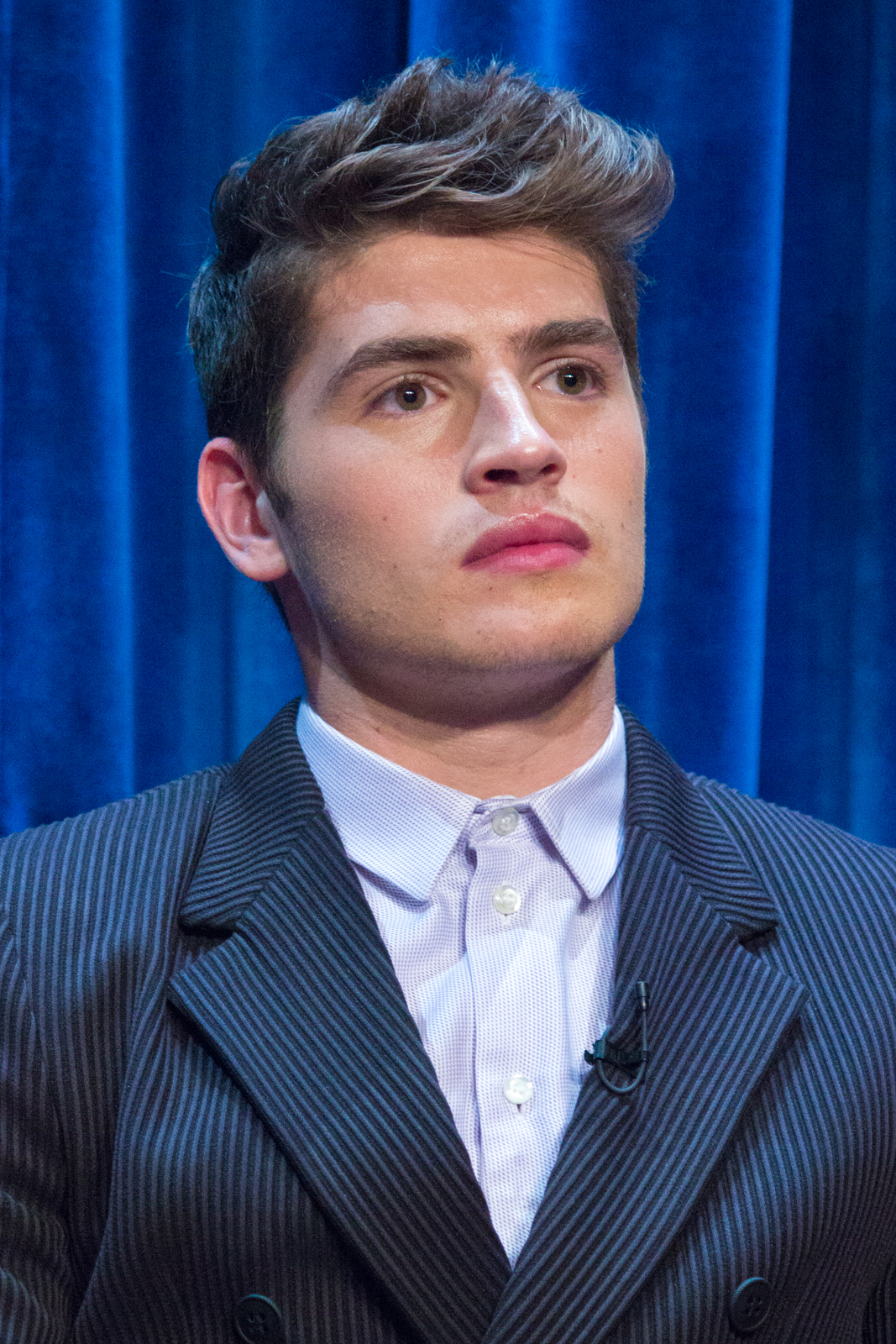
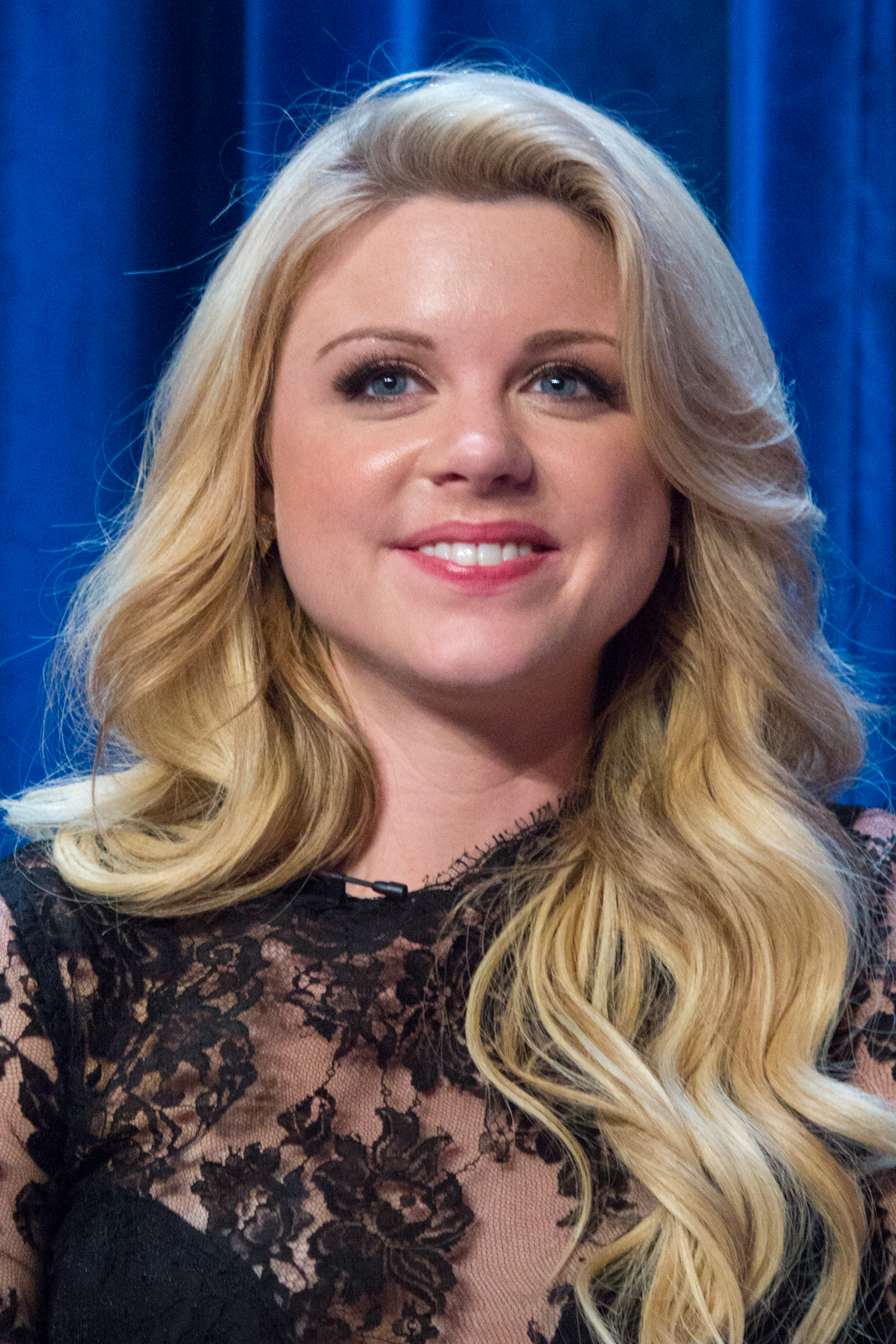
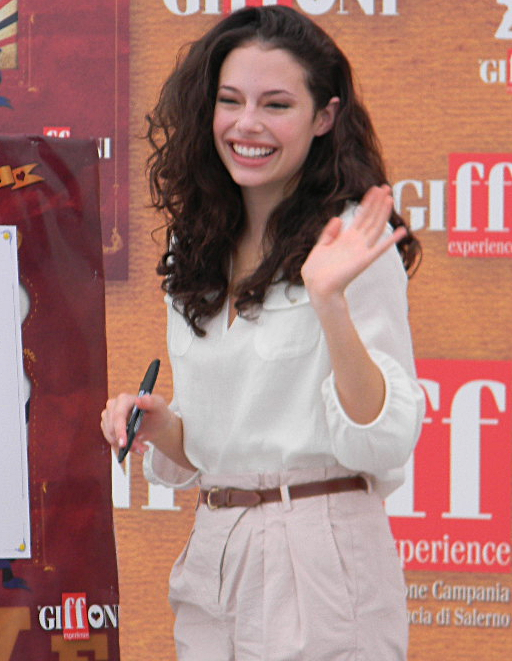
Gregg Sulkin, Bailey De Young and Chloe Bridges (left to right).
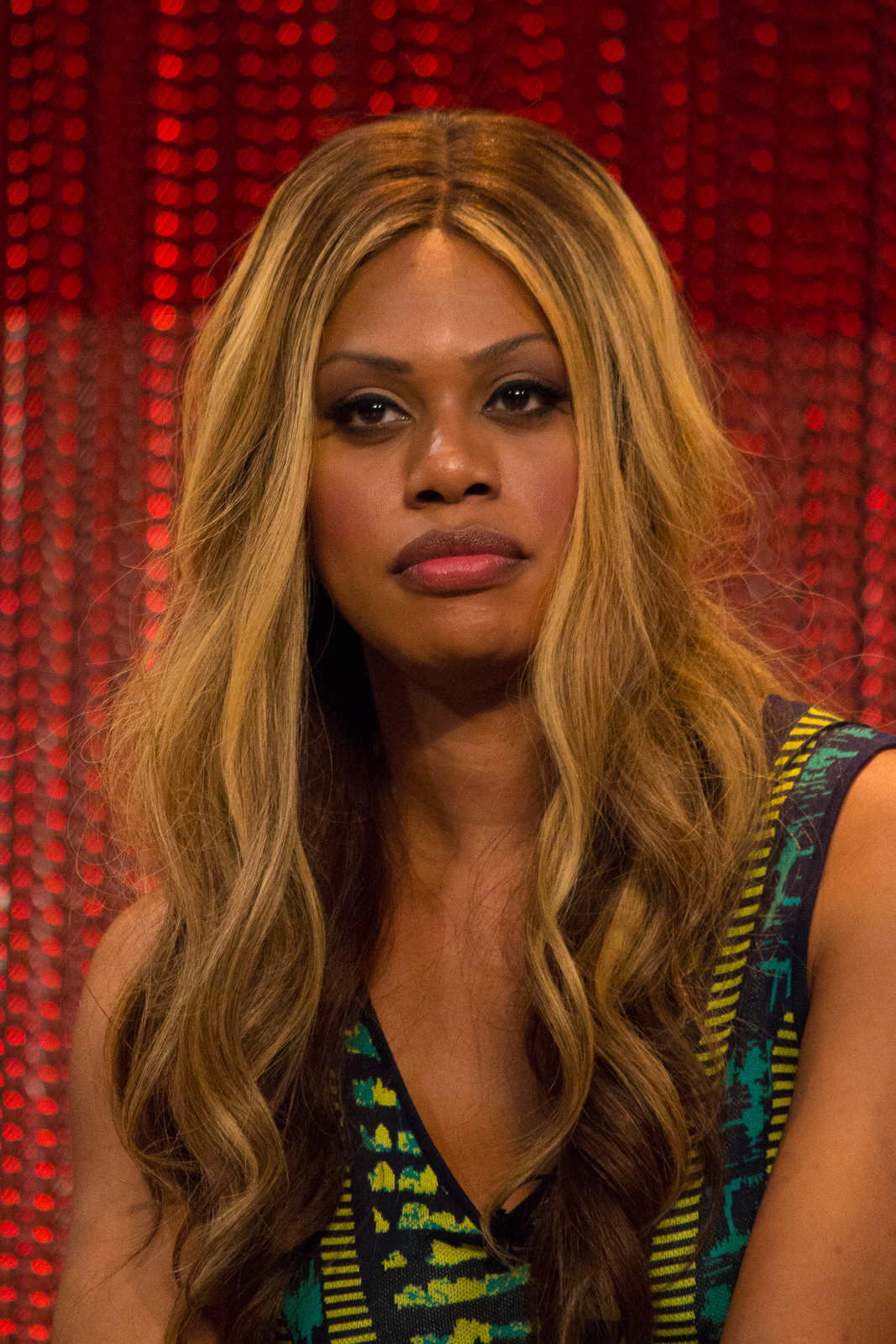
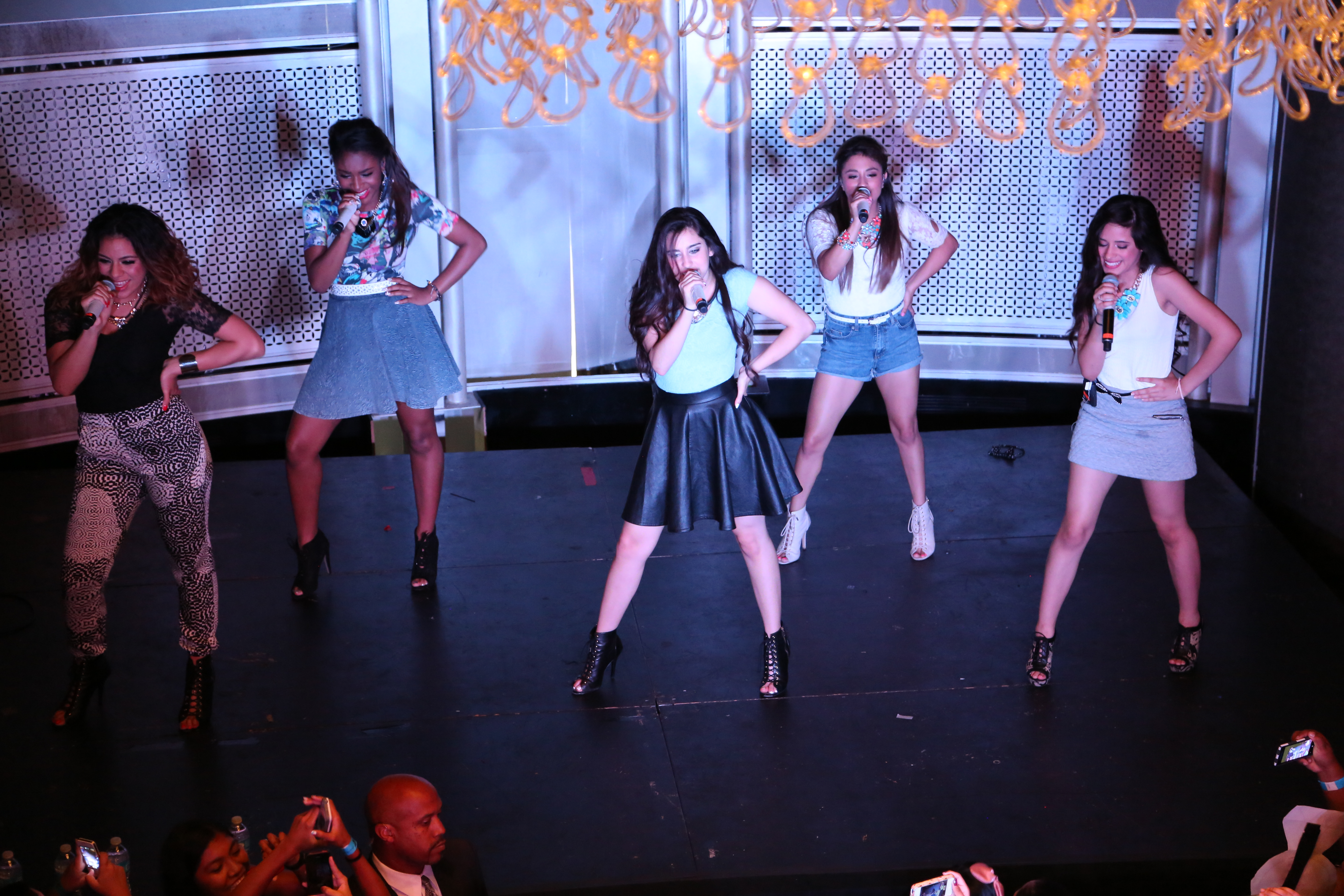
Laverne Cox and Fifth Harmony (left to right).
- Katie Stevens as Karma Ashcroft
- Rita Volk as Amy Raudenfeld
- Gregg Sulkin as Liam Booker
- Michael Willett as Shane Harvey
- Bailey De Young as Lauren Cooper

=== Recurring cast ===
- Rebecca McFarland as Farrah
- Senta Moses as Penelope Bevier
- Erick Lopez as Tommy Ortega
- Courtney Kato as Leila
- Breezy Eslin as Elizabeth
- Anthony Palacios as Pablo
- Amy Farrington as Molly
- Lance Barber as Lucas
- Dan Gauthier as Bruce Cooper
- Courtney Henggeler as Robin
- August Roads as Oliver Walsh
- Yvette Monreal as Reagan
- Keith Powers as Anthony "Theo"
- Bruce Thomas as Max Booker
- Skyler Maxon as Duke Lewis Jr.
- Chloe Bridges as Zita Cruz
- Bernard Curry as George Turner
- Parker Mack as Felix Turner
- Ed Quinn as Hank
- Lindsey Shaw as Sasha Harvey

=== Guest star ===
- Sofia Carson as Soleil
- Austin Lyon as Victor
- Laverne Cox as Margot
- Fifth Harmony as a girl group
- Mary Lambert as herself

== Production ==
On June 9, 2014, the series was picked up for a ten-episode second season, which was later expanded to a twenty-episode season. The episodes for 2A were broadcast on the time slot of Tuesdays from 10:30 PM–11:00 PM EST, while the 2B ones were broadcast on the time slot of Mondays from 9:30 PM–10:00 PM EST.

== Episodes ==
No. overall	No. in season	Title	Directed by	Written by	Original release date	US viewers (millions)
Part 1
9	1	"The Morning Aftermath"	Claire Scanlon	Carter Covington	September 23, 2014	1.04
Amy wakes up next to Liam after their wild night that neither of them remember. Karma comes into the room to talk things through with Amy, causing a naked Liam to sneak out the window, which Amy's mother sees before she and her husband are getting ready to leave for Mexico. After their failed attempt of talking things through, Karma follows Amy to the pharmacy where Amy buys the morning-after pill. Karma then bumps into Liam and they both agree to stay out of each other's lives. At the end of the night, Amy walks in her garage to find Lauren, Shane, Liam and Lauren's ex-boyfriend, Tommy. Tommy has been tied to a chair and dressed in bondage gear as part of a blackmail attempt to protect Lauren's secret (involving her mysterious pill-popping). However, Tommy reveals that Lauren's real secret is that she is intersex. The group is confused and Lauren feels humiliated.
10	2	"You Can't Handle the Truth or Dare"	Claire Scanlon	Megan Hearne	September 30, 2014	0.75
Amy continues to grow uncomfortable around Karma after revealing she loves her, and she invites Lauren to be the third-wheel in their movie night. However, when Lauren figures out the truth she invites her friends over which lead to a heated game of "Truth or Dare" that reveals everyone's secrets. Meanwhile, Liam makes a new friend, a transfer student named Theo, which causes Shane to become increasingly jealous.
11	3	"Lust in Translation"	Joe Nussbaum	Diana Metzger	October 7, 2014	0.73
When a busload of Brazilian refugees invades Hester High, Karma tries to get Amy a girlfriend. Meanwhile, Shane tries to get Liam's mind off of Karma while Lauren meets the new student Theo. Karma reveals a moment of jealousy upon seeing Amy with another girl.
12	4	"Lying Kings and Drama Queens"	Joe Nussbaum	Wendy Goldman	October 14, 2014	0.65
Karma, Shane, and Lauren compete for a spot in the coveted drama club headed by Margot (Laverne Cox). Meanwhile, Amy goes to Liam's parents' mansion to stop him from telling Karma about their secret, but inadvertently hears a few of Liam's family secrets.
13	5	"Present Tense"	Lee Rose	George Northy	October 21, 2014	0.71
It is Karma's 16th birthday as she faces the backlash for telling everyone the truth that she had been faking it as a lesbian in order to become popular. Amy tries to surprise Karma for her birthday, but the fun is hindered by Karma's obsession with wanting to open a birthday letter from Liam.
14	6	"The Ecstasy and the Agony"	Lee Rose	Dan Steele	October 28, 2014	0.69
Liam struggles with calling Karma his girlfriend; is it commitment issues or something else? Shane and Amy invite Lauren to an underground club. Lauren accidentally takes Ecstasy and becomes a full out party animal. Shane convinces Amy to talk to Reagan, who she eventually asks out. Guest Stars: Fifth Harmony as themselves
15	7	"Date Expectations"	Patrick Norris	Carrie Rosen	November 4, 2014	0.67
Amy and Reagan's relationship grows, with Karma feeling left out. Shane manipulates Karma into crashing Amy and Reagan's date with a "group hang" in order for Shane to hang out in public with his closeted "trainer," Duke. Amy and Reagan, Shane and Duke, Karma and Liam, and Lauren and Theo all end up having dinner together at Communal. The night is wrought with tension and things go awry for some of the couples.
16	8	"Zen and the Art of Pageantry"	Erin Ehrlich	Stefanie Leder	November 11, 2014	0.91
Amy and Lauren go head to head in a beauty pageant to vie for Amy's mom's affection. Karma figures out ways to tell her parents that she is dating Liam. Meanwhile, Shane spends time with his new boyfriend Duke, whose new sponsor, it turns out, is a homophobic fast-food chicken sandwich restaurant. Liam reveals to Karma that he slept with Amy.
17	9	"Karmic Retribution"	Jamie Travis	George Northy	November 18, 2014	0.85
The aftermath of Liam and Amy's secret being revealed to Karma is played out in a school social experiment, leading to an all out war with Amy struggling to tell Karma the truth while Liam shoulders all the blame. Meanwhile, Lauren becomes insecure in her relationship when she and Theo are placed in different social groups.
18	10	"Busted"	Jamie Travis	Carter Covington & Carrie Rosen	November 25, 2014	0.89
To distract herself from Theo, Lauren plans to run for school president only to find her plans thwarted when she learns that Shane is also running for similar reasons. Meanwhile, Theo reveals himself as Anthony, an undercover narcotics officer, who arrests Karma's parents and Karma under suspicion of dealing drugs. Amy has herself arrested as well in an attempt to get Karma to forgive her for having slept with Liam. At the same time, Liam manages to pull some strings with his father to get Amy, Karma and Karma's parents released from jail. This cliffhanger ends with a complex dream sequence indicating Karma has trust issues with Amy and Liam, and possibly has more complicated feelings for Amy than she was prepared to realize.
Part 2
19	11	"Stripped"	Jamie Travis	Carter Covington	August 31, 2015	0.92
Two weeks later, Karma claims she has forgiven Liam and Amy for sleeping together behind her back, and is back to being friends with benefits with Liam. However, Liam and Amy are suspicious that Karma isn't fully over their betrayal; Amy is also suspicious of Karma's new friend Felix, who Karma seems to be hiding from her. Meanwhile, Hester High School has appointed a new principal who wants to reshape the school after the drug bust. Shane and Lauren fight over their different approaches to handling this dictator-like regime at Hester. Felix is also revealed to be the son of Principal Turner.
20	12	"The Revengers: Age of the Monocle"	Jamie Travis	Erica Peterson	September 7, 2015	0.58
Reagan is oblivious to the fact that Amy feels suffocated with their relationship, and offers her a job catering with her at a fancy party. Amy pushes Karma to take the job instead, because she is short on money. At the party, Karma and Reagan realize that both their exes—Liam and Charlotte, respectively—are also attending; they agree to get revenge on each other's ex. Karma also meets Liam's budding co-worker Zita. Meanwhile, Shane and Amy help Lauren get revenge on Theo for hurting her.
21	13	"Future Tense"	Erin Ehrlich	Wendy Goldman	September 14, 2015	0.44
Amy is unable to honestly confess to Reagan that she is also attracted to males because of Reagan's history with other girls who were "experimenting." To distract herself, Amy works with Karma to apply for Clement University's summer program. During this process, they discover that Amy is attracted to Felix. This leads to a surprising development in Amy and Reagan's relationship. Meanwhile, Theo wins Lauren back and Liam convinces himself that he found his real father.
22	14	"Saturday Fight Live"	Erin Ehrlich	Dan Steele	September 21, 2015	0.40
Zita takes Karma, Liam, and Shane on her private jet to watch Duke's first commercial MMA fight in LA. There, everyone has a encounters a problem: Karma has some realizations about her relationship with Liam, Shane is shocked when Duke's publicist tells him to take a step back, and Zita has plans of her own with Liam. Leaving, Karma and Liam to call it quits. Meanwhile, Amy and Lauren believe that one of their parents is having an affair.
23	15	"Boiling Point"	Jamie Travis	Stefanie Leder	September 28, 2015	0.58
The gang and Felix end up in detention on a Saturday and secrets are revealed from everyone: Liam's father offered Karma a check of $250,000 to stay away from him; Amy wants Lauren to keep the secret about her mother's affair; Lauren is seen kissing Theo and Felix reveals that Principal Turner is his dad. Meanwhile, Shane wants to reach Duke to try reconciling their relationship before he moves away.
24	16	"Faking It... Again"	Patrick Norris	Carrie Rosen	October 5, 2015	0.37
Karma's mom wants her and Amy to fake being girlfriends again to support her at the PFLAG event. At the event, Amy realizes she still have feelings for Karma while Karma starts questioning that her mom might be ashamed of her true self. Their secret is finally exposed by Shane's mom—who is also a part of the PFLAG group. Meanwhile, things get heated between Amy and Lauren's family and Shane meets a cute boy who, just like him, recently broke up with someone.
25	17	"Prom Scare"	Brian Dannelly	George Northy	October 12, 2015	0.39
Principal Turner demands that the prom will be mandatory and that all students must take a date following protests involving art in the school. Amy feels uncomfortable with that since she doesn't want to go with Karma, so her feelings for her don't grow; so she invites Felix to accompany her. Shane wants to be invited by Wade—the guy he met on the PFLAG event, while Karma wants to be invited by her chemistry lab partner, only to find out they are the same guy. The three of them agree to go to the prom together. Meanwhile, Sasha keeps trying to seduce Liam.
26	18	"Nuclear Prom"	Linda Mendoza	Dan Steele	October 19, 2015	0.51
At the prom, Karma and Shane keep constantly trying to win Wade's attention, when Shane proposes a threesome. Sasha continues to try seducing Liam, who's reluctant to accept that. Liam and Shane fight because of Shane's proposal while Amy tries to convince Karma out of it and end up fighting too. The fight makes Liam stop resisting Sasha's provocations and they hook up. Felix then, admits his feelings to Amy, who kisses him. All of them get out of ball mad at each other; and Wade, Karma and Shane head to the hotel. Meanwhile, Lauren has the perfect prom dance with her ex, Tommy, which makes her question her feelings for Theo. Guest Star: Mary Lambert as herself
27	19	"The Deep End"	Jeff Melman	Stefanie Leder	October 26, 2015	0.44
On the morning after the prom, Karma and Shane each tell their version of how it went down with the alleged threesome to Amy and Liam, respectively. After Lisbeth lost her virginity before her, Lauren invites Tommy to her house for them to have sex. Once he gets there, the rest of the school comes along as the word on the street was there would be a party there. Karma, still trying to move on with her life, gets drunk and start dancing on the table, with her nipples showing off. Wade shows up to the party with his ex-girlfriend and tell Liam and Amy how the threesome actually went down—he quit on the last minute because he wasn't over his ex. Meanwhile, Shane convinces Sasha to come back to her ex-boyfriend, who later shows up at the party and confronts Liam. A drunk Felix crashes his dad's car in front of his house. Karma and Amy kiss at the pool.
28	20	"School's Out"	Jeff Melman	Carrie Rosen & George Northy	November 2, 2015	0.52
The morning after the party, Amy and Lauren's parents decide they will get divorced and Lauren is invited to go back to Dallas with her dad. Felix is revealed to be an alcoholic. Principal Turner intends to close Hester forever due to its exotic way of handling things, so the students start a protest and win. Zita finds out the name of Liam's dad and agrees to help look for him. Meanwhile, Amy looks for Reagan to try getting back together so she can forget Karma, only to find out Reagan moved on. She then decides to film the band on the summer tour. Karma comforts her and unsuccessfully asks her to stay.

== Reception ==
=== Reviews ===
The Young Folks had this to say about season 2A: "Faking It's sophomore season starts off with a bang, an emotional rollercoaster that, while not as big as the season finale's final minutes, has the perfect backdrop to lead up to some jaw-dropping events in the future." While "We Got This Covered" said this about season 2B: "Faking It is still a humorous nexus of forward-thinking, silver-tongued teenagers, but the second half of season two also cements the show as something else: a damn good ensemble sitcom."

=== Awards and nominations ===
Year	Association	Category	Nominee(s)	Result
2014	10th Annual AfterEllen Visibility Awards	Favorite TV Comedy	Faking It	Won
2014	10th Annual AfterEllen Visibility Awards	Favorite TV Actress	Rita Volk	Won
2014	10th Annual AfterEllen Visibility Awards	Favorite Fictional Lesbian Couple	Rita Volk / Yvette Monreal (Amy and Reagan)	Nominated
2014	10th Annual AfterEllen Visibility Awards	Favorite Lesbian/Bi Character	Rita Volk (Amy Raudenfeld)	Won
2014	10th Annual AfterEllen Visibility Awards	Editor's Pick for Favorite Tweeter	Yvette Monreal	Won
2015	People's Choice Awards	Favorite Cable TV Comedy	Faking It	Nominated
2015	GLAAD Media Awards	Outstanding Comedy Series	Faking It	Nominated
2015	Teen Choice Awards	Choice Summer TV Show	Faking It	Nominated
2015	Teen Choice Awards	Choice Summer TV Star: Male	Gregg Sulkin	Nominated

== Home media ==
The show is available for digital download on iTunes and Amazon.com. Although there hasn't been a wide DVD/BD release, on July 30, 2015 "Season 2, Part 1" was made available for purchase in DVD (Region 1) format per Manufactured on Demand (MOD) on Amazon.com The second part was released on DVD, in the same circumstances as Part 1, on June 15, 2016.
