= Faking It season 3 =

Faking It
- Season 3
- Promotional poster and DVD cover art
- No. of episodes: 10

Release
- Original network: MTV
- Original release: March 15 – May 17, 2016

Season chronology
- ← Previous; Season 2

The third and final season of Faking It, an American single-camera romantic comedy, premiered on March 15, 2016, on the MTV network. The show was renewed for a third season on April 21, 2015. Ten new episodes were produced.

== Plot ==
When their first summer apart comes to an end, Amy (Rita Volk) returns home and is ready to continue her friendship with Karma (Katie Stevens) now that she has finally moved on from her. But the two struggle to get their friendship back on track. Shane (Michael Willett), who is now friends with Karma, is caught between his friendship with both Amy and Karma. Liam (Gregg Sulkin) and Zita (Chloe Bridges) are now dating after spending the summer trying to find out more about Liam's past.

== Cast and characters ==
=== Main cast ===
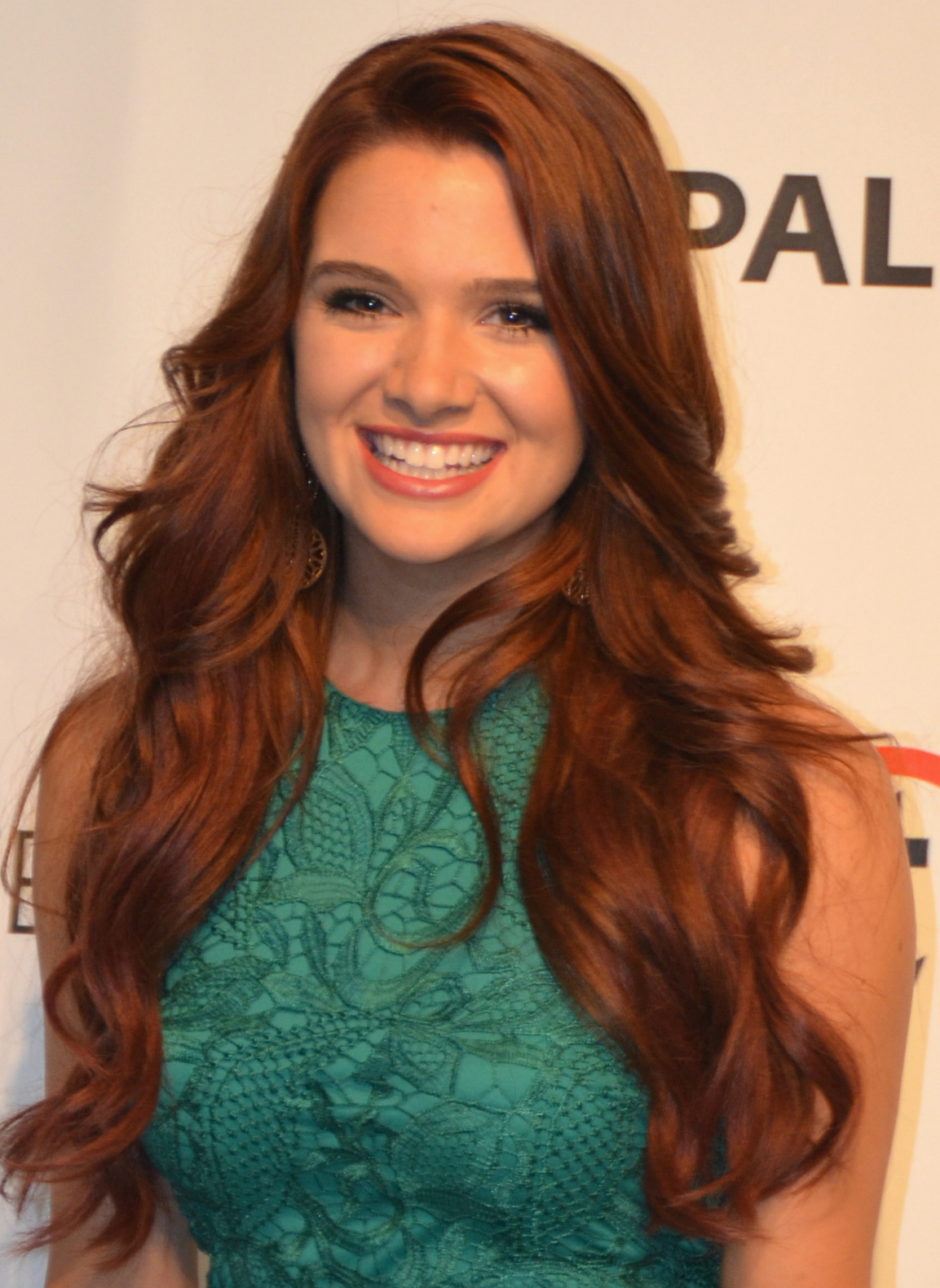
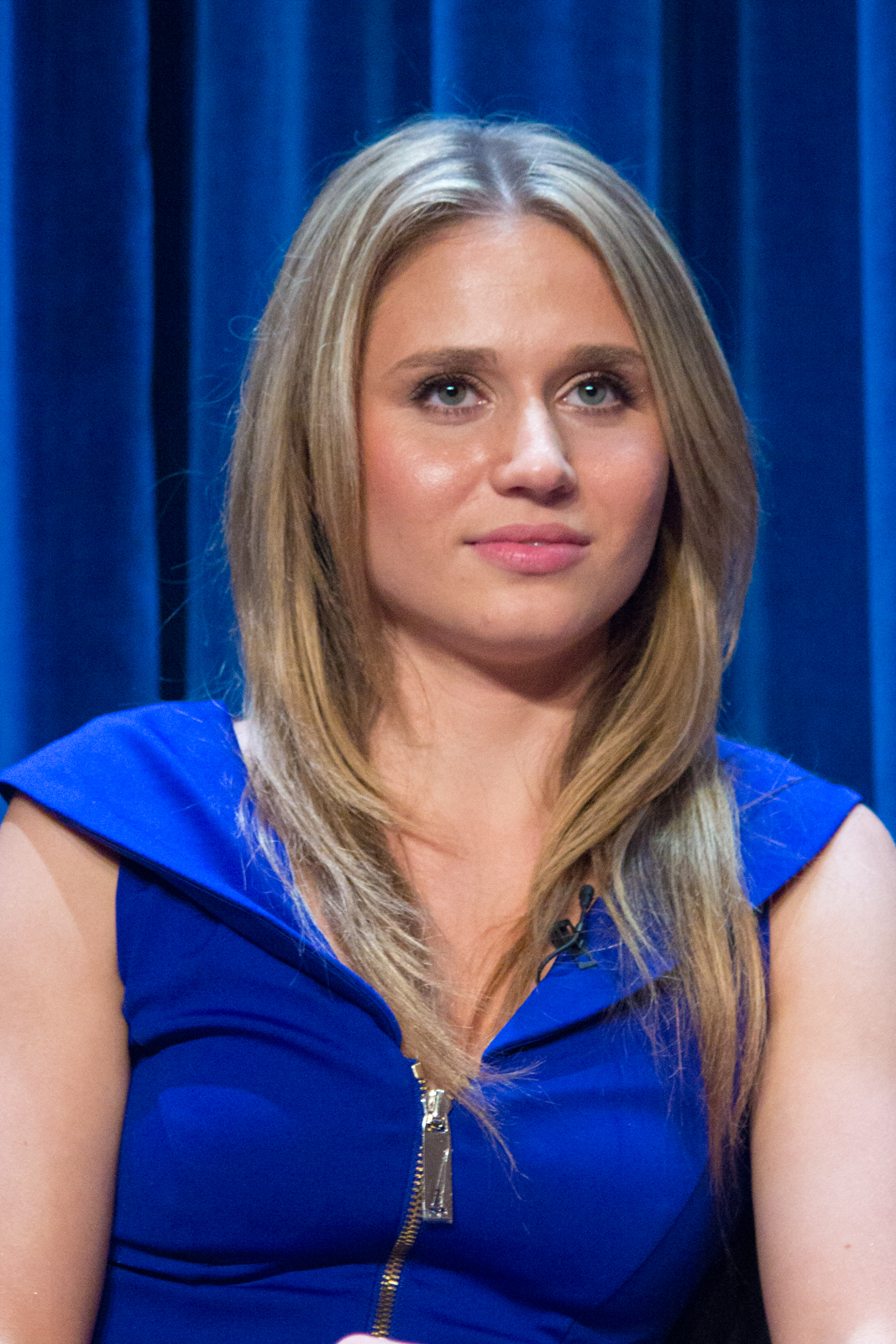
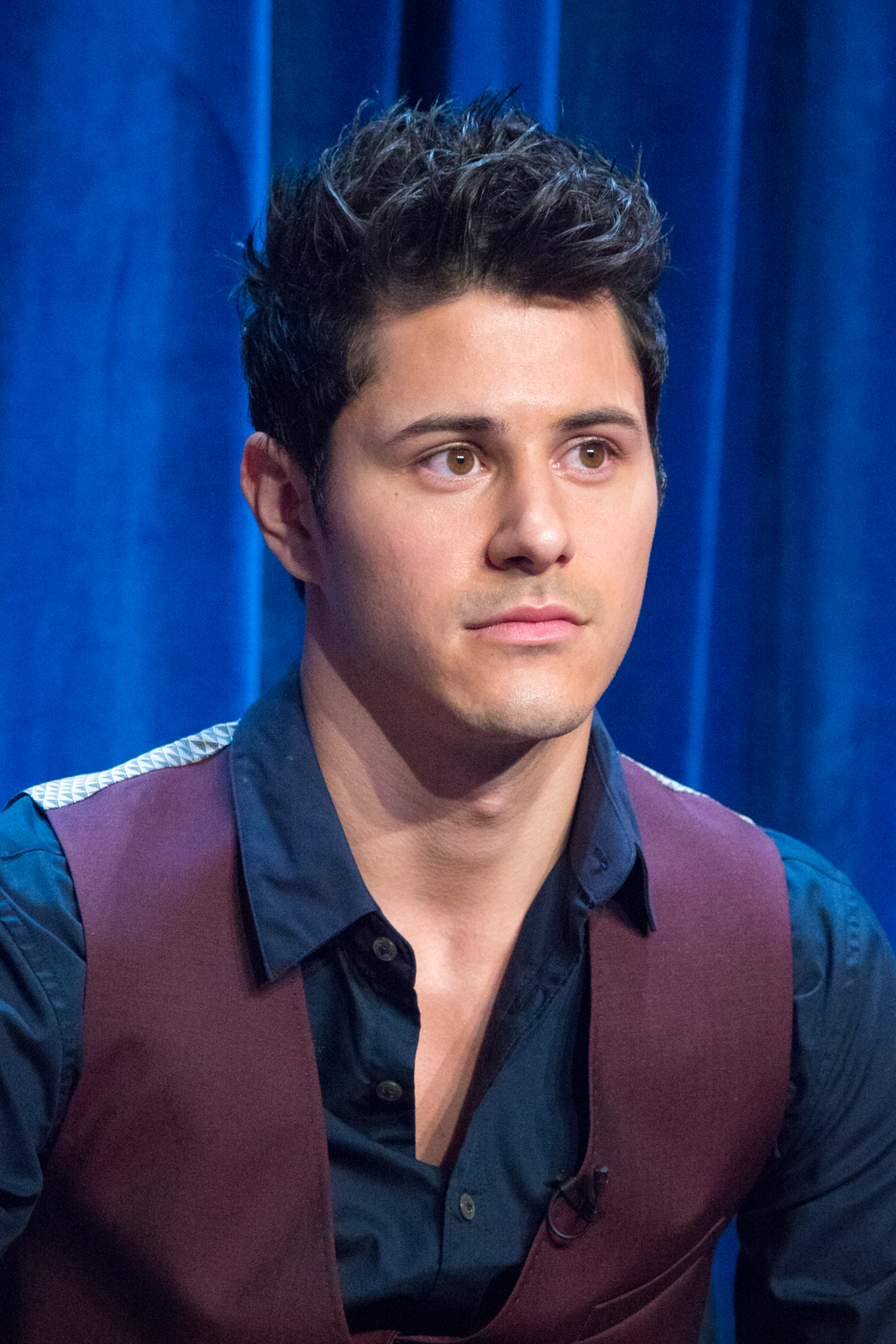
Katie Stevens, Rita Volk and Michael Willett (left to right).
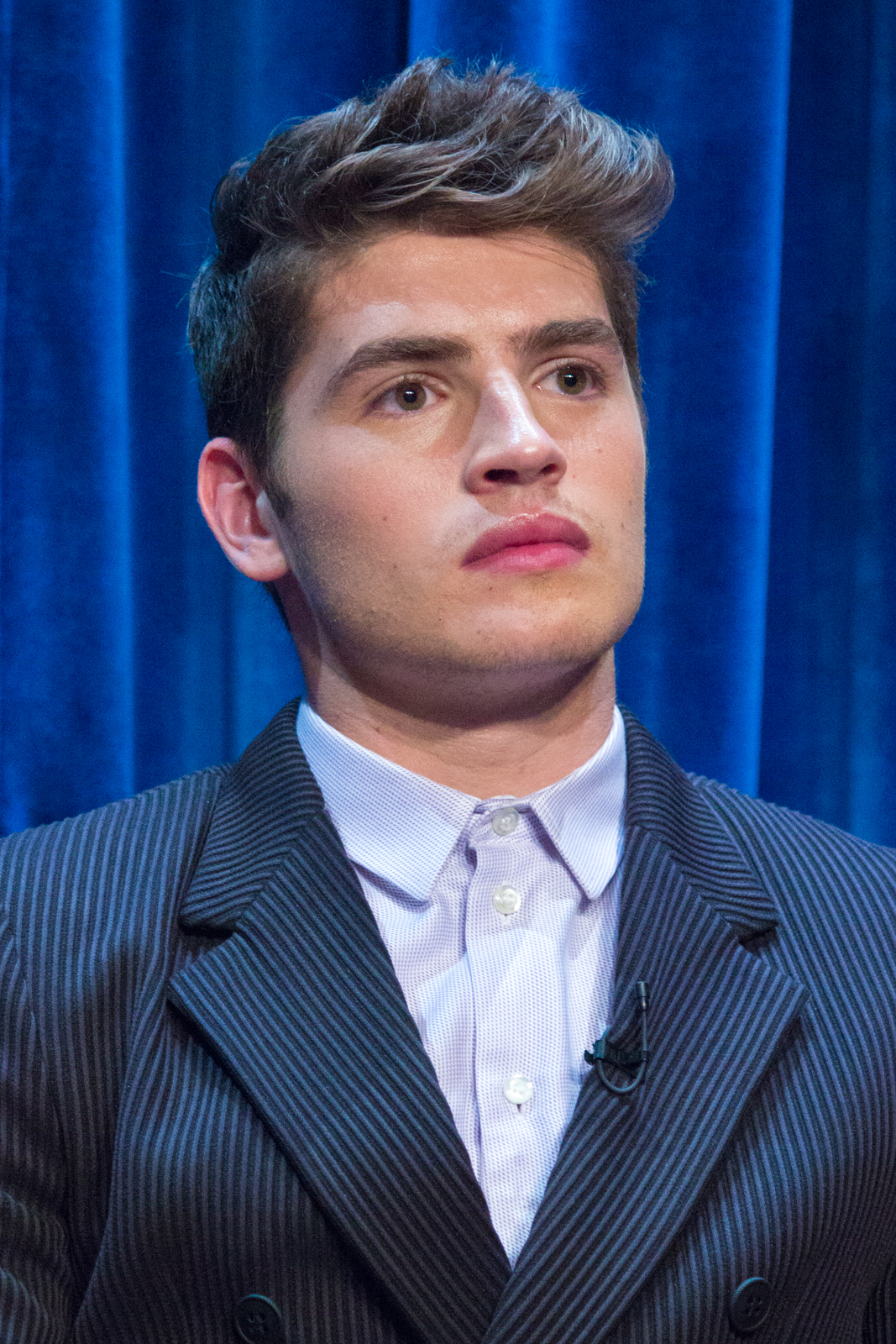
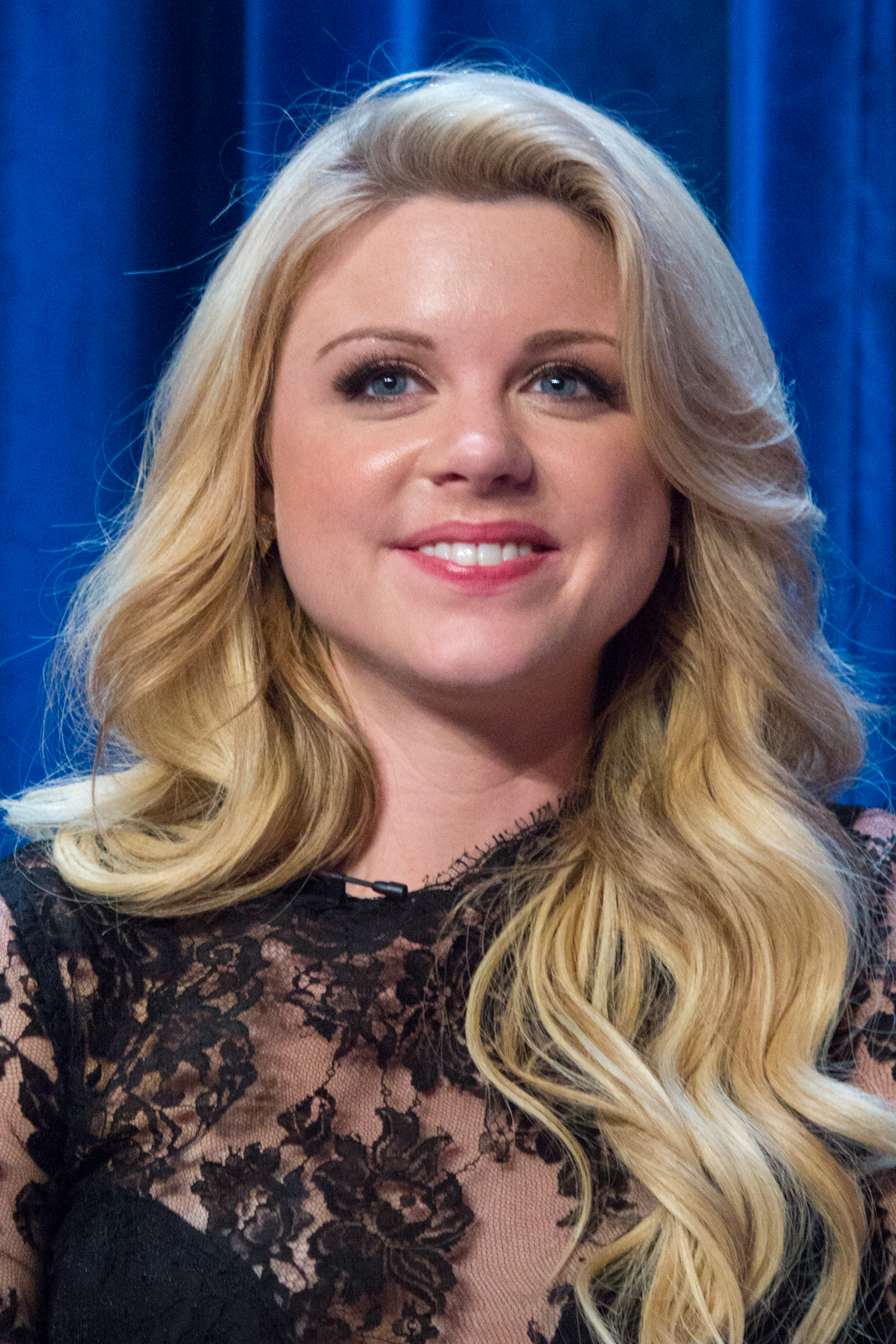
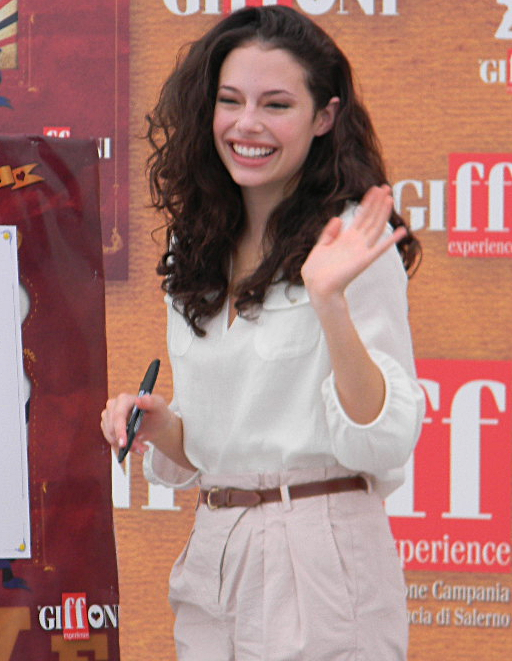
Gregg Sulkin, Bailey De Young and Chloe Bridges (left to right).
- Katie Stevens as Karma Ashcroft
- Rita Volk as Amy Raudenfeld
- Gregg Sulkin as Liam Booker
- Michael Willett as Shane Harvey
- Bailey De Young as Lauren Cooper

=== Recurring cast ===
- Rebecca McFarland as Farrah
- Senta Moses as Penelope Bevier
- Erick Lopez as Tommy Ortega
- Courtney Kato as Leila
- Amy Farrington as Molly
- Lance Barber as Lucas
- Dan Gauthier as Bruce Cooper
- August Roads as Oliver Walsh
- Chloe Bridges as Zita Cruz
- Parker Mack as Felix Turner
- Elliot Fletcher as Noah
- McKaley Miller as Rachel
- Jordan Rodrigues as Dylan
- Sophia Taylor Ali as Sabrina

== Production ==
The series was picked up for another season on April 21, 2015, which was set to premiere in 2016. Ten new episodes were produced. The episodes were broadcast on Tuesdays at 10:30PM ET/PT. A day before the supposed season finale, it was announced by MTV that the series would be cancelled after 3 seasons, making the third-season finale the series finale. The cancellation was attributed to low ratings and MTV's shift in strategy to focus on reality shows.

== Episodes ==
No. overall	No. in season	Title	Directed by	Written by	Original release date	US viewers (millions)
29	1	"It's All Good"	Jamie Travis	Carter Covington	March 15, 2016	0.28
After spending the summer in Portland, Oregon, Amy returns to Hestin for her senior year and is surprised by changes in Karma who has a new friend. Meanwhile, Liam is jealous about Shane's new friendship with Karma.
30	2	"Let's Hear It for the Oy"	Jamie Travis	Erica Peterson	March 22, 2016	0.40
Amy and Karma are both ready to make up, but neither of them wants to make the first move. Meanwhile, Zita shows her support for Liam by throwing him a "white only" party.
31	3	"Karmygeddon"	Jamie Travis	Stefanie Leder	March 29, 2016	0.37
Amy and Liam keep a secret from Karma. As Amy and Karma continue to feud, Lauren and Shane do damage control.
32	4	"Jagged Little Heart"	Silas Howard	Dan Steele	April 5, 2016	0.37
Trying to get her mind off Karma, Amy decides to do a documentary video about Lauren. Meanwhile, Karma and Shane decide to start a band where Shane has a meeting of minds with Noah, a competitor in a rival band.
33	5	"Third Wheels"	John Whitesell	George Northy	April 12, 2016	0.35
Amy and Lauren's plans to reunite their parents is derailed by a revelation in Karma's home life. Meanwhile, Liam and Shane have dinner with Liam's Rabbi who mistakenly thinks that Liam is gay and interested in Shane, not his daughter Rachel.
34	6	"Spooking It"	Patrick Norris	Story by : Erica Peterson; Teleplay by : Carter Covington	April 19, 2016	0.39
Amy and Karma use Hester High's annual Halloween costume party as an opportunity to move on away from each other, but they soon find themselves stuck on the past. Meanwhile, Shane is suspicious of what Liam may be hiding from him. Also, Lauren moves out of Amy's house and into her own condo.
35	7	"Game On"	Melanie Mayron	Carrie Rosen	April 26, 2016	0.35
Karma's rivalry with Amy's old summer camp friend, Sabrina, comes to a head at a game night at Lauren's apartment. Meanwhile, Liam tries to get on Lauren's good side. Also, Noah's mixed signals confuse Shane.
36	8	"Untitled"	Jeff Melman	Dan Steele	May 3, 2016	0.47
Lauren's quest to save the upcoming Christmas dance at Hester puts Amy in a difficult position. Meanwhile, Karma helps Felix get ready to ask out Amy. Also, Shane learns a secret about Noah.
37	9	"Ex-Posed"	Jeff Melman	Stefanie Leder	May 10, 2016	0.34
As Amy and Sabrina grow closer, Karma looks for proof that Sabrina is bad news in which she and Felix discover that Sabrina has a boyfriend. Meanwhile, Liam tries to set up Lauren, while Shane seeks dating advice about Noah.
38	10	"Up in Flames"	Jeff Melman	George Northy & Carrie Rosen	May 17, 2016	0.40
As the new year approaches, Karma takes drastic measures to make Amy happy by trying to get her and Sabrina back together. The return of an old friend, Elizabeth, now a famous Hollywood actress, makes Lauren more insecure than ever and she and Liam continue their fake romance. Shane finally meets Noah's brother who tries to advice him to change his lifestyle. As the New Year arrives, Amy and Sabrina get back together, and Felix kisses Karma; implying that something might develop between them.
