= List of Faking It (American TV series) episodes =

Faking It is an American comedy-drama television series created by Carter Covington that aired on MTV, starring Rita Volk, Katie Stevens, Gregg Sulkin, Michael Willett and Bailey De Young. The show revolves around best friends Amy Raudenfeld (Rita Volk) and Karma Ashcroft (Katie Stevens) who are mistaken for a closeted lesbian couple and outed by their popular, openly gay classmate Shane Harvey (Michael Willett) resulting in a surge of popularity at their offbeat high school. They decide to go along with the ruse as Karma has long desired to be popular, though her crush on Shane's best friend Liam Booker (Gregg Sulkin) threatens to further complicate the situation, as does Amy's conservative soon-to-be stepsister Lauren Cooper (Bailey De Young), who discovers that they're faking it.

The show was renewed for a third season on April 21, 2015. After the completion of the third season, Faking It was cancelled by MTV. During the course of the series, 38 episodes of Faking It aired over three seasons, concluding on May 17, 2016.

== Series overview ==
| Season | Episodes | | Originally released | |
| Season | Episodes | | First released | Last released |
|---|---|---|---|---|
| 1 | 8 | | April 22, 2014 | June 10, 2014 |
| 2 | 20 | 10 | September 23, 2014 | November 25, 2014 |
| 2 | 20 | 10 | August 31, 2015 | November 2, 2015 |
| 3 | 10 | | March 15, 2016 | May 17, 2016 |

== Episodes ==
=== Season 1 (2014) ===
| No. overall | No. in season | Title | Directed by | Written by | Original release date | US viewers (millions) |
|---|---|---|---|---|---|---|
| 1 | 1 | "Pilot" | Jamie Travis | Carter Covington | April 22, 2014 | 1.17 |
| 2 | 2 | "Homecoming Out" | Jamie Travis | Carter Covington | April 29, 2014 | 0.86 |
| 3 | 3 | "We Shall Overcompensate" | Jamie Travis | Drew Hancock | May 6, 2014 | 0.93 |
| 4 | 4 | "Know Thy Selfie" | Claire Scanlon | Megan Hearne | May 13, 2014 | 0.86 |
| 5 | 5 | "Remember the Croquembouche" | Claire Scanlon | Carrie Rosen | May 20, 2014 | 0.89 |
| 6 | 6 | "Three to Tango" | Claire Scanlon | George Northy | May 27, 2014 | 0.95 |
| 7 | 7 | "Faking Up Is Hard to Do" | Jamie Travis | Wendy Goldman | June 3, 2014 | 0.98 |
| 8 | 8 | "Burnt Toast" | Jamie Travis | Carter Covington | June 10, 2014 | 0.96 |

=== Season 2 (2014–15) ===
| No. overall | No. in season | Title | Directed by | Written by | Original release date | US viewers (millions) |
|---|---|---|---|---|---|---|
Part 1
| 9 | 1 | "The Morning Aftermath" | Claire Scanlon | Carter Covington | September 23, 2014 | 1.04 |
| 10 | 2 | "You Can't Handle the Truth or Dare" | Claire Scanlon | Megan Hearne | September 30, 2014 | 0.75 |
| 11 | 3 | "Lust in Translation" | Joe Nussbaum | Diana Metzger | October 7, 2014 | 0.73 |
| 12 | 4 | "Lying Kings and Drama Queens" | Joe Nussbaum | Wendy Goldman | October 14, 2014 | 0.65 |
| 13 | 5 | "Present Tense" | Lee Rose | George Northy | October 21, 2014 | 0.71 |
| 14 | 6 | "The Ecstasy and the Agony" | Lee Rose | Dan Steele | October 28, 2014 | 0.69 |
| 15 | 7 | "Date Expectations" | Patrick Norris | Carrie Rosen | November 4, 2014 | 0.67 |
| 16 | 8 | "Zen and the Art of Pageantry" | Erin Ehrlich | Stefanie Leder | November 11, 2014 | 0.91 |
| 17 | 9 | "Karmic Retribution" | Jamie Travis | George Northy | November 18, 2014 | 0.85 |
| 18 | 10 | "Busted" | Jamie Travis | Carter Covington & Carrie Rosen | November 25, 2014 | 0.89 |
Part 2
| 19 | 11 | "Stripped" | Jamie Travis | Carter Covington | August 31, 2015 | 0.92 |
| 20 | 12 | "The Revengers: Age of the Monocle" | Jamie Travis | Erica Peterson | September 7, 2015 | 0.58 |
| 21 | 13 | "Future Tense" | Erin Ehrlich | Wendy Goldman | September 14, 2015 | 0.44 |
| 22 | 14 | "Saturday Fight Live" | Erin Ehrlich | Dan Steele | September 21, 2015 | 0.40 |
| 23 | 15 | "Boiling Point" | Jamie Travis | Stefanie Leder | September 28, 2015 | 0.58 |
| 24 | 16 | "Faking It... Again" | Patrick Norris | Carrie Rosen | October 5, 2015 | 0.37 |
| 25 | 17 | "Prom Scare" | Brian Dannelly | George Northy | October 12, 2015 | 0.39 |
| 26 | 18 | "Nuclear Prom" | Linda Mendoza | Dan Steele | October 19, 2015 | 0.51 |
| 27 | 19 | "The Deep End" | Jeff Melman | Stefanie Leder | October 26, 2015 | 0.44 |
| 28 | 20 | "School's Out" | Jeff Melman | Carrie Rosen & George Northy | November 2, 2015 | 0.52 |

=== Season 3 (2016) ===
| No. overall | No. in season | Title | Directed by | Written by | Original release date | US viewers (millions) |
|---|---|---|---|---|---|---|
| 29 | 1 | "It's All Good" | Jamie Travis | Carter Covington | March 15, 2016 | 0.28 |
| 30 | 2 | "Let's Hear It for the Oy" | Jamie Travis | Erica Peterson | March 22, 2016 | 0.40 |
| 31 | 3 | "Karmygeddon" | Jamie Travis | Stefanie Leder | March 29, 2016 | 0.37 |
| 32 | 4 | "Jagged Little Heart" | Silas Howard | Dan Steele | April 5, 2016 | 0.37 |
| 33 | 5 | "Third Wheels" | John Whitesell | George Northy | April 12, 2016 | 0.35 |
| 34 | 6 | "Spooking It" | Patrick Norris | Story by : Erica Peterson; Teleplay by : Carter Covington | April 19, 2016 | 0.39 |
| 35 | 7 | "Game On" | Melanie Mayron | Carrie Rosen | April 26, 2016 | 0.35 |
| 36 | 8 | "Untitled" | Jeff Melman | Dan Steele | May 3, 2016 | 0.47 |
| 37 | 9 | "Ex-Posed" | Jeff Melman | Stefanie Leder | May 10, 2016 | 0.34 |
| 38 | 10 | "Up in Flames" | Jeff Melman | George Northy & Carrie Rosen | May 17, 2016 | 0.40 |
