= Pilot (Faking It) =

- Faking It episode
- Episode no.: Season 1 Episode 1
- Directed by: Jamie Travis
- Written by: Carter Covington
- Original air date: April 22, 2014
- Running time: 22 minutes

Episode chronology
← Previous —	Next → "Homecoming Out"

Pilot is the pilot episode and the first episode of the first season of the American romantic comedy TV series Faking It. It aired on MTV in the United States on April 22, 2014. It was written by series developer and executive producer Carter Covington and directed by Jamie Travis. The episode primarily focuses on introducing the series, two best friends, Karma (Katie Stevens) and Amy (Rita Volk) after numerous failed attempts to become popular, they are mistakenly outed as lesbians, which instantly makes them popular and the centre of attention. Karma is aroused with their sudden popularity, as the most handsome guy Liam (Gregg Sulkin) notices her and becomes attracted to her. On the contrary, Amy is annoyed with having to carry on.

== Plot ==
The episode opens with Karma and Amy discussing a plan to make them popular at their very liberal high school. It is evident from the beginning that the two girls live very different lives from the depiction of their family. Amy is still not on board with Karma pretending to be blind and questions how they will even be able to make people believe it. The plan soon backfires when Karma catches a frisbee and throws it back.

Lauren soon shows up with her 'minions' and orders Karma and Amy to get out of her light. Amy tells her not to piss her off and that she has access to her toothbrush. She later tells them to go back to the Isle of Lesbos when both Shane and Liam show up. After they chase Lauren off they introduce themselves. Karma becomes nervous at seeing Liam and runs off. Amy introduces herself and accepts Shane's party invitation before running off to find Karma. Once she is gone Shane comments that they would be the perfect "lesbian" friends.

At Shane's party they are shocked at how everyone seems to be different compared to at school. Karma gets up to get drinks when she sees Liam. We then see Shane enter and comment that everyone is wearing too much clothes. Lauren shows up since she is one of the lead candidates for homecoming queen, which Shane comments no one cares about. She says everyone does and that she is there to set things straight. As Karma gets the drinks and is about to leave the room she bumps into Liam and spills it over them both. He apologizes and she faints.

Outside, Shane goes up to Amy who is waiting for Karma to come back. He says he has been craving lesbian energy and Amy says even though she is flattered, she is not gay. He then says he was like her once, afraid to be himself. Amy decides to go look for Karma so they can leave the party.

Back inside Liam gives Karma his jacket and comments that her dress is see-through now. A girl, Brandy, shows up and tells her to back off because Liam is hers. He says he is not her boyfriend and makes her go away. He says the girls become too 'clingy' and Karma says he should be grateful because if it were not for women being wired to reproduce the population would have died out. He says he is glad to have a lesbian around to tell him these things. She is shocked but before she can ask what he means Amy drags her away. Before they can escape, Shane announces that two people are afraid they will not be accepted. He says the only way to assure them they are safe is to elect them homecoming queens which generates applause.

At the bus stop Karma and Amy discuss how its stupid that the school things they are lesbians. Karma suggests they should see how this plays out. She also says she was sure Liam flirted with her and at that Amy thinks Karma must have hit her head. They arrive at school and make a scene, Karma kisses Amy on her cheek and runs off.

Shane and the rest of the campaign are busy putting up posters of Karma and Amy where Liam comments that the lipstick one, referring to Karma is kinda sexy. Lauren spins in and begins tearing them down. Amy finds Karma rubbing a pregnant girl's stomach before she leaves and comments on them being a cute couple. Karma says she is taking an opportunity here says they should continue it which Amy reluctantly agrees to. Karma then runs of to put on her fake eyelashes.

After putting them on she notices Liam working on an art piece of his. She explains it to him and they share a kiss after he takes off one of her fake eyelashes. At the same time Amy shows up and catches them. She shows a sad look as she witnessed them.

In the locker room Karma talks about how kissing Liam felt. Amy tells her to shut up and that gym class was enough torture. Karma ask what is up with her and she explains that she never wanted any of this. Karma questions why she even went along with it in the first place and Amy says to make her happy. Karma says she does not want it and is told she better find a new girlfriend. All this time Lauren was on the other side listening to the conversation.

We then see Liam come up to Karma who is eating lunch. She tells him and that she and Amy broke it off and he says he hopes it was not because of yesterday. She says they were just different people and runs of to find her and apologize. She finds her at the top of a building and they make up. Amy agrees to go to the homecoming assembly and also agrees to continue the lesbian ruse.

We then see Lauren finishing up her speech for why she should be voted for just as Amy and Karma come in. Before they can say anything she makes a point of telling everyone they are faking being lesbians and that she heard them talking about it. To keep up the lie Amy grabs Karma and passionately kisses her. The school launches into cheer and they pull apart. Karma says "Way to sell it!" and winks before running off. Amy just remains in her place with a shocked expression that might hint she enjoyed the kiss.
