= Ania Spiering =

American actress

Ania Spiering is a Russian born American actress and fashion model known for films Argo, Land of the Lost and The Hungover Games. She was also a face of the fourth season of American Horror Story: Freak Show.
