= List of Faking It episodes =

List of Faking It episodes may refer to:

- List of Faking It (2000 TV series) episodes
- List of Faking It (2014 TV series) episodes
