= Keith Powers =

American actor (born 1992)

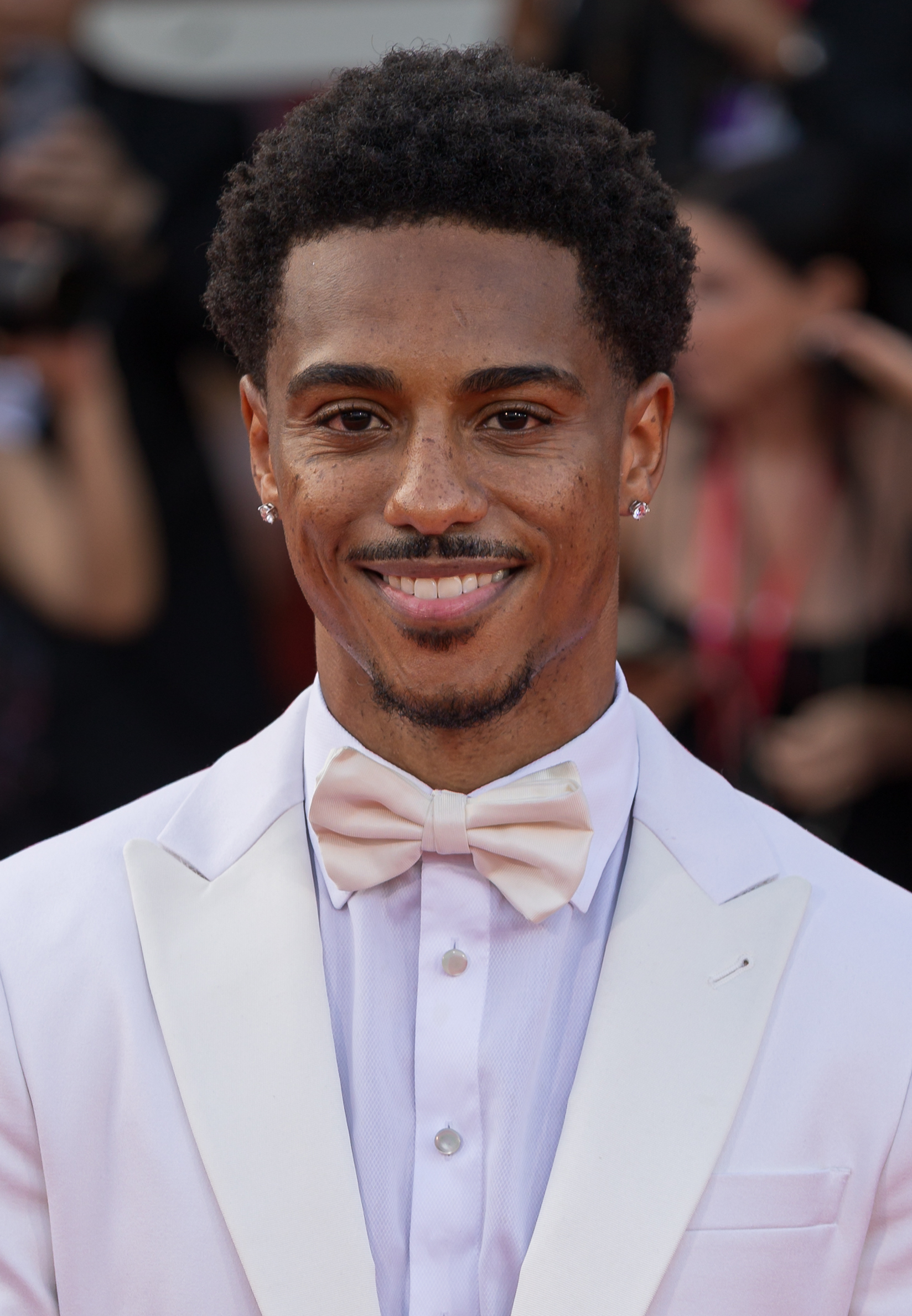
- Powers at the 82nd Venice International Film Festival in 2025
- Born: Keith Tyree Powers; August 22, 1992 (age 34); Sacramento, California, U.S.
- Occupations: Actor; model
- Years active: 2009–present
- Partner(s): Ryan Destiny (2017–present; engaged)

Keith Tyree Powers (born August 22, 1992) is an American actor. He is best known for his roles as Tyree in the film Straight Outta Compton (2015), Ronnie DeVoe in BET's miniseries The New Edition Story (2017), and David in the Netflix film Uglies (2024). Powers was also featured as Cameron in the Netflix film #RealityHigh (2017).

== Career ==
After graduating from Sheldon High School in 2010, he moved to Los Angeles with his father to focus on modeling, signing with the Wilhelmina Agency.

In 2013, Powers landed a role in the movie House Party: Tonight's the Night. After flying to South Africa for shooting, he decided to pursue acting full-time. He played Gutta in the BET hip hop anthology series Tales, and Cameron Drake in the Netflix original film Reality High. He had a recurring role on the MTV series Faking It and has since become known for his part as Tyree in the film Straight Outta Compton. He was cast as Ronnie DeVoe in The New Edition Story and later co-starred in Famous in Love on Freeform. He also appeared in the Netflix series What/If (2019).

In 2024, Powers co-starred as David in the Netflix film Uglies, an adaptation of the 2005 novel by the same name by Scott Westerfeld.

== Personal life ==
Keith Powers is in a relationship with actress and singer Ryan Destiny. The two dated for four years from 2017 to 2022 before ending their relationship, but Destiny later confirmed on The Breakfast Club morning show that the breakup was "just a [little] bump in the road", and the two have since gotten back together. The couple announced on Instagram on October 5, 2025 that they had gotten engaged.

== Filmography ==
=== Film ===
Year	Title	Role	Notes
2013	House Party: Tonight's the Night	Quentin	Video
2015	Straight Outta Compton	Tyree	
2017	Before I Fall	Patrick	
2017	#RealityHigh	Cameron Drake	
2017	Maximum Impact	Special Agent Vance	
2021	Violet	Keith	
2021	The Tomorrow War	Major Greenwood	
2021	On Our Way	David Adler	
2023	Door Mouse	Ugly	
2023	The Perfect Find	Eric	
2024	Uglies	David	
2026	The Gates	Tyon	

=== Television ===
Year	Title	Role	Notes
2013	Pretty Little Liars	Stringer Guy	Episode: "Gamma Zeta Die!"
2014–2015	Faking It	Theo	Recurring cast: Season 2
2015	Fear the Walking Dead	Calvin	Episode: "Pilot"
2015	Sin City Saints	LaDarius Pope	Main cast
2016	Recovery Road	Zach	Recurring cast
2017	Wild 'N Out	Himself/co-team Captain	Episode: "New Edition Cast/Nick Grant"
2017	The New Edition Story	Ronnie DeVoe	Main cast
2017	Tales	Amari "Gutta" Anderson	Episode: "Cold Hearted"
2017–2018	Famous in Love	Jordan Wilder	Main cast
2019	What/If	Todd Archer	Main cast
2024	The Emperor of Ocean Park	Lionel	Supporting cast

=== Music videos ===
Year	Song	Artist	Director(s)	Role
2019	"Single Again"	Big Sean	Lawrence Lamont	Elliot

== Awards and nominations ==
Year	Category	Nominated work	Result
2024	NAACP Image Award for Outstanding Actor in a Television Movie, Mini-Series or Dramatic Special	The Perfect Find	Won
