= 10 Things I Hate About You (TV series) =

American television sitcom

- Genre: Sitcom
- Based on: 10 Things I Hate About You by Karen McCullah Lutz; Kirsten Smith
- Developed by: Carter Covington
- Starring: Lindsey Shaw; Meaghan Martin; Ethan Peck; Nicholas Braun; Dana Davis; Kyle Kaplan; Larry Miller
- Theme music composer: Richard Gibbs
- Composer: Richard Gibbs
- Country of origin: United States
- Original language: English
- No. of seasons: 1
- No. of episodes: 20

Production
- Executive producers: Carter Covington; John Ziffren; Robin Schiff
- Producers: Shawn Wilt; Michael Platt; Barry Safchik
- Camera setup: Single-camera
- Running time: 25 minutes
- Production company: ABC Family Original Productions

Original release
- Network: ABC Family
- Release: July 7, 2009 – May 24, 2010

10 Things I Hate About You is an American television sitcom broadcast on ABC Family beginning in 2009. Developed by Carter Covington, the show is a half-hour, single-camera series based on the 1999 film of the same name. It premiered on Tuesday, July 7, 2009, at 8 pm. Following its initial 10-episode run, a second set of 10 episodes aired from March 29, 2010, to May 24, 2010. The series was cancelled in April 2010.

== Plot ==
According to Covington, also the executive producer and showrunner, the series is "a reimagining of the movie as a TV show". Sisters Kat & Bianca have just moved and are starting at their new school, Padua High. As they start a new academic year at a new high school, Kat & Bianca attempt to navigate the environment in their own ways; Kat being a "confrontational outcast" and Bianca a "social climber" in the view of Randee Dawn.

== Cast and characters ==
=== Main ===
The cast of 10 Things I Hate About You television series

- Lindsey Shaw as Katerina "Kat" Stratford, a high school junior and Bianca's older sister
- Meaghan Martin as Bianca Stratford, a sophomore and Kat's little sister
- Ethan Peck as Patrick Verona, a brooding high school junior who often gets into trouble
- Nicholas Braun as Cameron James, an awkward sophomore in love with Bianca
- Dana Davis as Chastity Church, a sophomore and the most popular girl in school
- Kyle Kaplan as Michael Bernstein, a sophomore and Cameron's best friend
- Larry Miller as Dr. Walter Stratford, Kat and Bianca's overprotective father

=== Recurring ===
- Suzy Nakamura as Principal Holland
- Chris Zylka as Joey Donner
- Jolene Purdy as Mandella
- Leslie Grossman as Ms. Darlene Tharpe
- Jack Salvatore Jr. as Brad
- Ally Maki as Dawn
- Allie Gonino as Michelle
- Cody McMains as Keith
- Ashley Jackson as Tabitha Cook

== Development and production ==
In 2008, ABC Family announced their intention to create a comedy pilot based on the 1999 movie. The pilot was written by Carter Covington, a self-professed fan of the film. ABC Family green-lit the comedy in October 2008. In November 2008, casting was announced for the pilot, with production following that fall. In February 2009, the pilot was picked up when ABC Family ordered 9 additional episodes.

While Covington sought a "reimagined" adaptation, there are several connections between the pilot and the movie, which gave the pilot the same feel. Gil Junger, who directed the movie, also directed the pilot and served as series consultant. Richard Gibbs, who was credited for the original music in the 1999 movie, also composed the theme music for the pilot. In addition, Larry Miller reprised his role as the overprotective father, Walter Stratford. A cover of I Want You to Want Me by Cheap Trick (which was covered for the film by Letters to Cleo) was recorded by KSM. A music video was shot which featured members of the cast with KSM.

The pilot was shot at a high school in Tujunga, California. Due to budget constraints, future episodes were filmed at a soundstage in Santa Clarita, California, with only occasional external shots in Tujunga.

Covington served as the series' showrunner, as well as an executive producer. He stated that he wanted the show "to feel like a John Hughes film every week." Junger remained on board and directed seven of the first 10 episodes of the series.

On April 29, 2010, executive producer Carter Covington announced on his Twitter account that the series had been canceled by ABC Family due to low ratings. He later revealed his intended storylines for the next season in an interview with Entertainment Weekly.

== Episodes ==
20 episodes were produced, 12 of them directed by Gil Junger, who also directed the original film.

No.	Title	Directed by	Written by	Original release date	U.S. viewers (millions)
1	"Pilot"	Gil Junger	Carter Covington	July 7, 2009	1.60
The Stratford sisters, Kat and Bianca, have just moved to California and are preparing for their first day at their new high school. Bianca sucks up to Chastity, the cruel but beautiful head cheerleader, in hopes of becoming part of the crowd. Cameron, an unpopular student, instantly falls in love with Bianca. Meanwhile, Kat befriends loner Mandela and finds herself drawn to the mysterious Patrick.
2	"I Want You to Want Me"	Gil Junger	Carter Covington	July 14, 2009	1.10
Bianca tries to impress Chastity by arranging a fund-raising event for the cheerleading squad. Chastity gets jealous over Bianca's success while Cameron hopes that sending Bianca a carnation will finally make her notice him. Meanwhile, Kat deals with an unwanted admirer.
3	"Won't Get Fooled Again"	Gil Junger	Barry Safchik & Michael Platt	July 21, 2009	1.59
Bianca overhears plans for a party and enlists Cameron to help her get the address. Kat finds out she and Patrick like the same band and he invites her to a concert. Both Stratford sisters sneak out of the house, but neither of their nights turn as planned.
4	"Don't Give a Damn About My Bad Reputation"	Gil Junger	Erin Ehrlich	July 28, 2009	1.80
Kat and Patrick get into a fight when he litters on school property and they end up in the principal's office. Meanwhile, Bianca decides that it's time to rid herself of her squeaky clean image and starts a rumor about herself. Cameron is dismayed to find out that Bianca thinks he's gay.
5	"Don't Give Up"	Phil Traill	Lauren Iungerich	August 4, 2009	1.12
Kat decides to convert her car to biodiesel fuel and enrolls in the auto shop class. Chastity makes a deal with Bianca: if she helps Joey raise his chemistry grade so he can play football, Chastity will allow Bianca on the cheerleading squad. Meanwhile, Cameron tries to figure out how to get Bianca's attention.
6	"You Can't Always Get What You Want"	Gil Junger	Jon Ross	August 11, 2009	1.17
Bianca and her friend Dawn ask Cameron for help in setting up a web reality show to raise money so they can afford to hang out with Chastity. After Kat complains about her English teacher's easy grading, she succeeds in getting the grading policy changed. Patrick advises Cameron to show Bianca he is capable of protecting her, so Cameron tries to keep a watchful eye on her reality show.
7	"Light My Fire"	Rodman Flender	Stefanie Leder	August 18, 2009	1.23
When residents are evacuated to Padua High during a brushfire emergency, Bianca tries to use the crisis as yet another opportunity to win over Chastity. Meanwhile, Patrick and Kat finally kiss, but his attempts to compliment her backfire. Cameron becomes worried that he caused the fire by launching a model rocket.
8	"Dance Little Sister"	Gil Junger	Barry Safchik & Michael Platt	August 25, 2009	1.15
Bianca is excited to be asked to the Fall Fling by Beau Bradley, the captain of the soccer team. Meanwhile, Cameron overhears Beau bragging about his plans to seduce Bianca and resolves to sabotage her date. Bianca finds out about Cameron's sabotage while Patrick gets arrested at the school dance.
9	"(You Gotta) Fight for Your Right (To Party)"	Henry Chan	Erin Ehrlich	September 1, 2009	1.21
When Walter goes out of town, Bianca convinces a reluctant Kat to throw a party. Cameron confesses his love for Bianca, but she gently rejects him. Bianca comforts Joey after he gets into a fight with Chastity and they two kiss, but quickly agree it was a mistake.
10	"Don't Leave Me This Way"	Gil Junger	Carter Covington & Robin Schiff	September 8, 2009	1.21
Chastity tells Bianca that she will be replacing a sick cheerleader on the squad. Padua High has started a new security policy that includes a bag search, metal detectors, and a uniform policy. Chastity uses blackmail and has the uniform policy revoked. Patrick sees security searching his locker and leaves without his bag. Kat picks up the bag and follows Patrick, while the principal threatens suspension.
11	"Da Repercussions"	Henry Chan	Erin Ehrlich	March 29, 2010	N/A
After leaving school without permission, Kat and Patrick are caught and suspended. Kat worries about how the zero grade and suspension might affect her college plans, so she sneaks in and takes the test, but is caught by the principal. Walter comes to school to defend Kat, but when he learns of Patrick's involvement in Kat's suspension, he gets angry and calls her a liar. Bianca confesses to Chastity about her kiss with Joey.
12	"Don't Trust Me"	Gil Junger	Carter Covington & Robin Schiff	April 5, 2010	N/A
Walter insists Kat invite Patrick over for dinner, hoping to scare Patrick away. Patrick agrees, but not before he and Kat concoct a plan to scare Walter instead. Meanwhile, Chastity demands that Bianca break up with Joey. Walter comes to terms with the fact that his daughter Kat is growing up and making decisions on who she dates.
13	"Great Expectations"	Phil Traill	Stefanie Leder	April 12, 2010	N/A
Both Kat and Bianca have dinner dates with their boyfriends. Walter feels the need to discuss the horrors of childbirth with Patrick and Joey. Bianca and Joey have a horrible first date, ending after Joey learns she is a virgin, but makeup later. Kat ends up developing a case of food poisoning, and Patrick takes her home.
14	"Meat is Murder"	Gil Junger	Ben Epstein & Graham Moore	April 19, 2010	N/A
Kat starts to protest for Meatless Mondays with the assistance of a new British student, William "Blank" Blankenship. Meanwhile, Bianca tries to find a girl for Cameron but in the end, fails once the girl gets fed up with trying to be someone she's not. Walter tries out a new dating site but finds out that his date is a phony.
15	"The Winner Takes It All"	Gil Junger	Jordon Nardino	April 26, 2010	N/A
Bianca enters the Padua High Talent Show and decides to sing "The Kids of America", enjoying the attention from her father. Kat joins the talent show with Cameron in a scheme to one-up Bianca. Afterward, Kat and Bianca have a heart-to-heart talk about the jealousy between them. Note: Josie Loren as Kaylie Cruz and Cassie Scerbo as Lauren Tanner from Make It or Break It make cameo appearances.
16	"Too Much Information"	John Putch	Niki Schwartz-Wright	May 3, 2010	N/A
Kat is worried about Patrick's odd behavior and recruits Cameron to help her spy on him. Meanwhile, after watching the reality show The Biggest Poser, Joey wants to be a cast member, but Bianca worries that this goal may lead to an eating disorder.
17	"Just One Kiss"	Melanie Mayron	Erin Ehrlich	May 10, 2010	N/A
When Bianca and Joey seek a second couple for a double date, she decides to set up Cameron and Dawn. Kat becomes upset when Patrick says their relationship is not exclusive and she can date whomever she wants. She accepts an invite from Blank, but Patrick sees them on their date and it greatly bothers him. Patrick and Blank get into a fight as they are leaving and he finally calls Kat his girlfriend. Walter finds romance with the girls' school counselor.
18	"Changes"	Gil Junger	Stefanie Leder	May 17, 2010	N/A
Kat and Patrick consider taking their relationship to the next level. Walter considers dating the girls' guidance counselor and Joey makes it onto "The Biggest Poser". Bianca has her friends over for a dinner party to patch things up with Dawn and Cameron. Michael surprises everyone by admitting he's gay. Walter and Ms. Tharpe have their first date.
19	"Ain't No Mountain High Enough"	Henry Chan	Carter Covington	May 24, 2010	N/A
The girls find out Walter is dating their guidance counselor, Darlene Tharpe. Meanwhile, Kat wants a change of scenery and chooses to study abroad in Nepal, which she hopes will help her get her mind off Patrick.
20	"Revolution"	Gil Junger	Robin Schiff	May 24, 2010	N/A
Chastity decides to name Bianca vice head cheerleader, displacing Michelle. Meanwhile, Kat runs for class president against Blank. Kat's speech writer Tabitha Cook defects to Blank's campaign and crafts a fake video that causes Kat to lose the students' respect and the election. Walter returns early from a conference and intends to comfort Kat after the lost election, but discovers Kat and Patrick in a post-coital embrace in her bed.

== Release and home media ==
The series library is available to stream in the United States on Hulu.

=== International ===
Country / Region	Network(s)	Series premiere	Series title
Australia	FOX8		10 Things I Hate About You
United Kingdom	Fiver	September 23, 2009	10 Things I Hate About You
Italy	Mya, MTV	January 16, 2010	10 Cose che odio di te
Canada	YTV	March 19, 2010	10 Things I Hate About You
Saudi Arabia	Orbit Showtime	March 2010	10 Things I Hate About You
Malaysia	8TV	July 1, 2010	10 Things I Hate About You
Thailand	True Series	July 20, 2010	10 Things I Hate About You
Ireland	TG4	September 2010	10 Things I Hate About You
Germany	VIVA	October 12, 2011	10 Dinge die ich an dir hasse
New Zealand	TV2		10 Things I Hate About You
Finland	Nelonen	January 1, 2013	Teinielämää
Brazil	Animax		10 Coisas que Eu Odeio em Você

=== DVD ===
DVD title	Region 1	Discs	Episodes	Extras	Studio
10 Things I Hate About You: Volume One	January 12, 2010	2	1–10	Audio Commentaries; Bloopers; a "Backstage Pass" Featurette (Behind the scenes with Meaghan and Lindsey); Pilot Episode of Make It or Break It	Buena Vista Home Entertainment
10 Things I Hate About You: Volume Two	September 20, 2011	3	11–20	Extended Scenes, Rap Video, Joey's Make-up Transformation	Shout! Factory

== Reception ==
=== Critical response ===
On the review aggregator website Rotten Tomatoes, the series holds an approval rating of 88% based on 16 reviews, with an average rating of 6.90/10. The site's critics consensus reads, "10 Things I Hate About You manages to capture much of the same energy as the film it's based upon, thanks in part to a fantastic lead performance from Lindsey Shaw." On Metacritic, the first season of the show holds a score 66 out of 100 based on reviews from 9 critics, indicating "generally favorable reviews".

Brian Lowry of Variety described the show as "a solid roll for the cable network that was once an albatross around the neck of parent Disney". Randee Dawn of The Hollywood Reporter thought that the series "has genuine appeal". Mike Hale from The New York Times named the show to his top ten in 2009, stating that "in the dog days of July," the sitcom "may have been the best thing on television." Several critics praised the series for containing clever dialogue and appealing and rooted characters.

Alessandra Stanley of The New York Times called the series "not very inventive," and the New York Post, gave the show a mixed review concluding that the show is "silly, mindless fun" whose "actors are all terrific in that silly, mindless fun way that Disney teens tend to be."

=== Ratings ===
The series premiere drew 1.60 million viewers, a record at that time for a 30-minute comedy debut on the ABC Family network.

=== Accolades ===
Dana Davis received a nomination for Best Performance- Comedy at the 2010 NAMIC Vision Awards. Meaghan Martin received a nomination for Best Performance in a TV Series (Comedy or Drama) - Supporting Young Actress at the 2010 Young Artist Awards.
