= The Hungover Games =

- Official DVD cover
- Directed by: Josh Stolberg
- Written by: David Bernstein; Kyle Barnett Anderson; Jamie Kennedy
- Produced by: Ash R. Shah; Ben Feingold; Jim Busfield; Steve Small; Jamie Kennedy
- Starring: Ben Begley; Ross Nathan; Herbert Russell; Rita Volk; Jamie Kennedy
- Cinematography: Andrew Strahorn
- Edited by: Byron Wong
- Music by: Todd Haberman
- Production companies: Silver Nitrate; Sense and Sensibility Ventures
- Distributed by: Sony Pictures Home Entertainment
- Release date: February 18, 2014
- Running time: 85 minutes
- Country: United States
- Language: English
- Box office: $332,977 (Video sales only)

The Hungover Games is a 2014 American parody film, directed by Josh Stolberg. The film's title and central plot primarily follow both The Hangover and The Hunger Games, as well as parodying Ted, Pirates of the Caribbean, Avatar, Charlie and the Chocolate Factory, The Human Centipede, The Lone Ranger, Django Unchained, Thor, Carrie, The Muppets, Borat, Taken, The Walking Dead, and The Real Housewives.

== Plot ==
Four friends head out for a bachelor party for their friend Doug, who is marrying a man named Tracey. They plan a quiet, subdued night at a small hotel in Laughlin, Nevada. They put their friend Zach in a straitjacket and cone to ensure he does not drug them and they drink non-alcoholic beer.

Waking up the next morning, they are in a strange room littered with party and sex toys and realize that Doug is missing. A woman named "Effing" walks in and Zach recognizes her as a remake of Effie Trinket. When Ed opens the door they find they are on a train bound for the "Hungover Games," a fight to the death in an arena between various Hollywood districts. The three watch a video on Zach's phone and see that they all volunteered as tribute the previous night in their drunken state. They will have to fight in the games to find Doug and get him back to his wedding in time.

At the training center they meet other tributes, including the gay Thor, Tonto, Gratuitous Nudity (two topless women), Carrie (nicknamed Scary), and Teddy. Ed meets Katnip Everlean, a girl he met the previous night while drunk who likes him. Training ends and they are sent to rooms where they will ascend into the arena. While searching the rooms they see a man rising but are forced out after Zach spills boba tea on the control panel.

The games begin and the tributes begin murdering each other. Zach becomes separated from Ed and Bradley. The two flee and spend the night in a tree to sleep but witness two other tributes' deaths. They see Zach with the Careers and see he has joined them to help find (and kill) Ed and Bradley. In the morning Bradley drops a hive of "Swaggerjacks" (wasps) onto the careers sleeping below them. In the process Bradley and Ed are stung several times and the hallucinogenic venom causes them to pass out. They awaken and find Zach has nursed them back to health and they continue searching for Doug.

Zach tells them they are in the Hungover Games because the previous night he plugged in poisoned "midnight berry" scented air-fresheners that drugged them and were labeled "may cause transportation to futuristic dystopia." Enraged, Ed and Bradley leave Zach.

Later, Ed and Bradley decide to reunite with Zach after the rule change stating that people who share a "bromance" can win as a group.

The three head back to the Pornucopia after an announcement that something everyone is looking for is located there. They rush to the Pornucopia and are attacked by Carrie. Zach murders Carrie, then Teddy, Vomit the Frog and Miss Porky attack them but Zach blows them up using his Hunger Games book, then Katnip returns and saves Ed from Teddy. She reveals she was mortally wounded in her fight with Tonto and dies with Ed beside her.

When they find out that their prize at the Pornucopia is a cell phone, and not Doug, they think they will never find him and start to call his fiancée Tracey to tell him what's up. However, Ed stops Bradley from making the call when he realizes where Doug is: his tube never came up because Zach's bubble tea short-circuited it. After looking into it they see that Doug isn't there, but he emerges from the forest, camouflaged, and attacks them, berating them about how they always forget him and how he is almost never in the movies. They tell him they will never forget him again and that he will have more lines in the next film, and he decides to spare them.

Another rule change states that there can only be one victor and the four turn on each other. Zach proposes they all eat poisonous berries, as the creators of the games would never let them all die as they would rather have four victors than none, and would stop them before they can eat the poison. His plan fails, as they eat the berries and die with no one stopping them.

They wake up in their hotel room, realizing it was all just a shared dream. The four go to the wedding where Ed laments about Katnip but runs into an identical looking girl who seems to be attracted to him.

== Cast ==
- Ben Begley as Ed, parody of Stu, and his actor, Ed Helms
- Ross Nathan as Bradley, a parody of Phil and his actor, Bradley Cooper
- Herbert Russell as Zach, a parody of Alan, the name also parodying his actor, Zach Galifianakis
- Rita Volk as Katnip Everlean, a parody of Katniss Everdeen.
- John Livingston as Doug, a parody of the character of the same name from the Hangover films.
- Robert Wagner as Liam, a parody of Liam Neeson in Taken
- Caitlyn Jenner (Note: Known as Bruce Jenner until her gender transition in 2015.) as Skip Bayflick, a parody of Caesar Flickerman
- Hank Baskett as Stephen A. Templesmith, parody of Claudius Templesmith and Stephen A. Smith
- Brandi Glanville as Housewife Veronica
- Camille Grammer as Housewife Tanya
- Kyle Richards as Housewife Heather
- Dat Phan as Bao, a parody of Mr. Chow from the Hangover films
- Sam Pancake as Tracey
- Ron Butler as President Snowbama, a parody of President Coriolanus Snow and 44th President of the United States Barack Obama.
- Tara Reid as Effing White, a parody of Effie Trinket
- Chanel Gaines as Boo
- Kayden Kross as Chastity the Topless Blonde
- Sophie Dee as Kirsty the Topless Brunette
- Jonathan Silverman as Chineca Lame, parody of Seneca Crane.
- Jamie Kennedy as Justmitch, a parody of Haymitch Abernathy / Willy Wanker, a parody of Willy Wonka from Charlie and the Chocolate Factory / Tim Pistol
- Steve Sobel as Kaptain Kazakhstan, a parody of Borat
- Caitlin Wachs as Scary, a parody of Carrie White from the 2013 film of the same name.
- Terra Jolé as Teddy, a parody of Ted
- Mark Harley as Thor
- Jeff Torres as Tonto, from the film The Lone Ranger
- Dan Buran as Captain Jack, a parody of Jack Sparrow from Pirates of the Caribbean

== Reception ==
Brian Orndorf writing for Blu-ray.com gives the film 3/10 stars.

== See also ==
- The Starving Games
- The Hunger Pains
