= Teen Choice Award for Choice Summer TV Series =

- Country: United States
- First award: 2005
- Final award: 2019
- Currently held by: Stranger Things (2019)

Highlights
- Most wins: Teen Wolf (4)
- Most nominations: So You Think You Can Dance (14)
- Website: http://www.teenchoice.com/

The following is a list of Teen Choice Award winners and nominees for Choice Summer TV Series. This award was first introduced in 2005 with Degrassi: The Next Generation being the inaugural recipient.

Teen Wolf is the series with most wins in this category, with four wins of six nominations. While, So You Think You Can Dance is the most nominated series with fourteen nominations, winning twice. Currently the last series awarded as Choice Summer TV Series is Stranger Things in 2019.

== Winners and nominees ==
=== 2000s ===
Year	Winners	Nominees	Ref.
2005	Degrassi: The Next Generation	American Dad!; Beauty and the Geek; Big Brother; Dancing with the Stars; Hell's Kitchen; Laguna Beach: The Real Orange County; The Real World: Austin	
2006	So You Think You Can Dance	America's Got Talent; Big Brother: All-Stars; Entourage; Kyle XY; Rock Star: Supernova	
2007	Degrassi: The Next Generation	America's Got Talent; Don't Forget the Lyrics!; The Singing Bee; So You Think You Can Dance	
2008	The Secret Life of the American Teenager	America's Best Dance Crew; Degrassi: The Next Generation; High School Musical: Get in the Picture; So You Think You Can Dance	
2009	Princess Protection Program	Make It or Break It; Paris Hilton's My New BFF; The Secret Life of the American Teenager; So You Think You Can Dance	

=== 2010s ===
Year	Winners	Nominees	Ref.
2010	Pretty Little Liars	Make It or Break It; The Secret Life of the American Teenager; So You Think You Can Dance; Wipeout	
2011	Pretty Little Liars	Keeping Up with the Kardashians; So You Think You Can Dance; Switched at Birth; Teen Wolf	
2012	Teen Wolf	America's Got Talent; The Secret Life of the American Teenager; So You Think You Can Dance; Workaholics	
2013	Pretty Little Liars	The Fosters; So You Think You Can Dance; Teen Wolf; Under the Dome	
2014	Wipeout	Baby Daddy; Girl Meets World; So You Think You Can Dance; Under the Dome; Young & Hungry	
2015	Teen Wolf	Baby Daddy; Chasing Life; Faking It; Scream; So You Think You Can Dance	
2016	Teen Wolf	Baby Daddy; The Fosters; Girl Meets World; So You Think You Can Dance: The Next Generation; Young & Hungry	
2017	Teen Wolf	America's Got Talent; Beat Shazam; The Bold Type; The Fosters; So You Think You Can Dance	
2018	So You Think You Can Dance	Beat Shazam; The Bold Type; Cloak & Dagger; Cobra Kai; Total Bellas	
2019	Stranger Things	Cobra Kai; Nailed It!; So You Think You Can Dance; The Bold Type; Younger	

== Series with multiple wins ==
4 Wins

- Teen Wolf

3 Wins

- Pretty Little Liars

2 Wins

- So You Think You Can Dance
- Degrassi: The Next Generation

== Series with multiple nominations ==
So You Think You Can Dance is the most nominated TV Series in this category (14), resulting in two wins.

14 Nominations

- So You Think You Can Dance

6 Nominations

- Teen Wolf

4 Nominations

- America's Got Talent
- The Secret Life Of The American Teenager

3 Nominations

- Baby Daddy
- Degrassi: The Next Generation
- Pretty Little Liars
- The Bold Type
- The Fosters

2 Nominations

- Big Brother
- Beat Shazam
- Cobra Kai
- Girl Meets World
- Make It Or Break It
- Under The Dome
- Wipeout
- Young & Hungry
