= Faking It (American TV series) =

2014 American romantic comedy television series

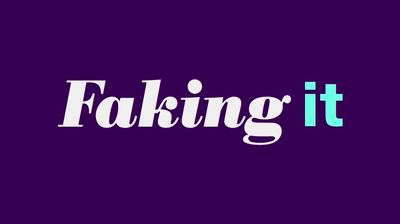
- Genre: Comedy drama; Romantic comedy; Teen drama
- Created by: Dana Min Goodman; Julia Wolov
- Developed by: Carter Covington
- Starring: Rita Volk; Katie Stevens; Gregg Sulkin; Michael Willett; Bailey De Young
- Composer: Andrew Dost
- Country of origin: United States
- Original language: English
- No. of seasons: 3
- No. of episodes: 38 (list of episodes)

Production
- Executive producer: Carter Covington
- Producers: Nellie Nugiel; Stefanie Leder
- Production location: Glendora, California
- Cinematography: Doug Emmett; Massimiliano Trevis
- Editors: Robin Katz; Thomas M. Bolger; Gabriel Fleming; Brad Katz; Robert Lattanzio
- Camera setup: Single-camera
- Running time: 22 minutes
- Production company: Viacom Media Networks

Original release
- Network: MTV
- Release: April 22, 2014 – May 17, 2016

Faking It is an American romantic comedy television series that premiered on MTV on April 22, 2014, starring Rita Volk, Katie Stevens, Gregg Sulkin, Michael Willett, and Bailey De Young. The series was created by Dana Min Goodman and Julia Wolov. Carter Covington developed the series and serves as the executive producer. An eight-episode first season was ordered by MTV in October 2013. MTV announced a 10-episode second season set to premiere on September 23, 2014. In August 2014, the show won a Teen Choice Award for "Choice TV Breakout Show". In October 2014, MTV ordered 10 more episodes, meaning season two would have a total of 20 episodes. The series features the first intersex main character on a television show, and also included television's first intersex character played by an intersex actor (Amanda Saenz).

In April 2015, it was announced that the second half of season two would air from August 31, 2015, as well as being renewed for a third season which premiered on March 15, 2016. In May 2016, MTV announced that Faking It had been cancelled after three seasons.

== Plot ==
At Hester High School in the suburbs of Austin, being different is popular. After many failed attempts to stand out, Karma Ashcroft (Katie Stevens) and her best friend Amy Raudenfeld (Rita Volk) are invited to a house party hosted by popular gay student Shane Harvey (Michael Willett), who is under the impression that the girls are a lesbian couple.

At the party, they are subsequently outed as the school's first lesbian couple and unwillingly nominated for homecoming Queens. Continuing the charade as their popularity soars, Karma attracts the attention of the popular and handsome Liam Booker (Gregg Sulkin), while Amy becomes aware of her growing romantic feelings for Karma and a rivalry with her new step-sister, Lauren (Bailey De Young), who discovers that they are faking it.

== Episodes ==
Season	Episodes		Originally released	
Season	Episodes		First released	Last released
1	8		April 22, 2014	June 10, 2014
2	20	10	September 23, 2014	November 25, 2014
2	20	10	August 31, 2015	November 2, 2015
3	10		March 15, 2016	May 17, 2016

== Cast ==
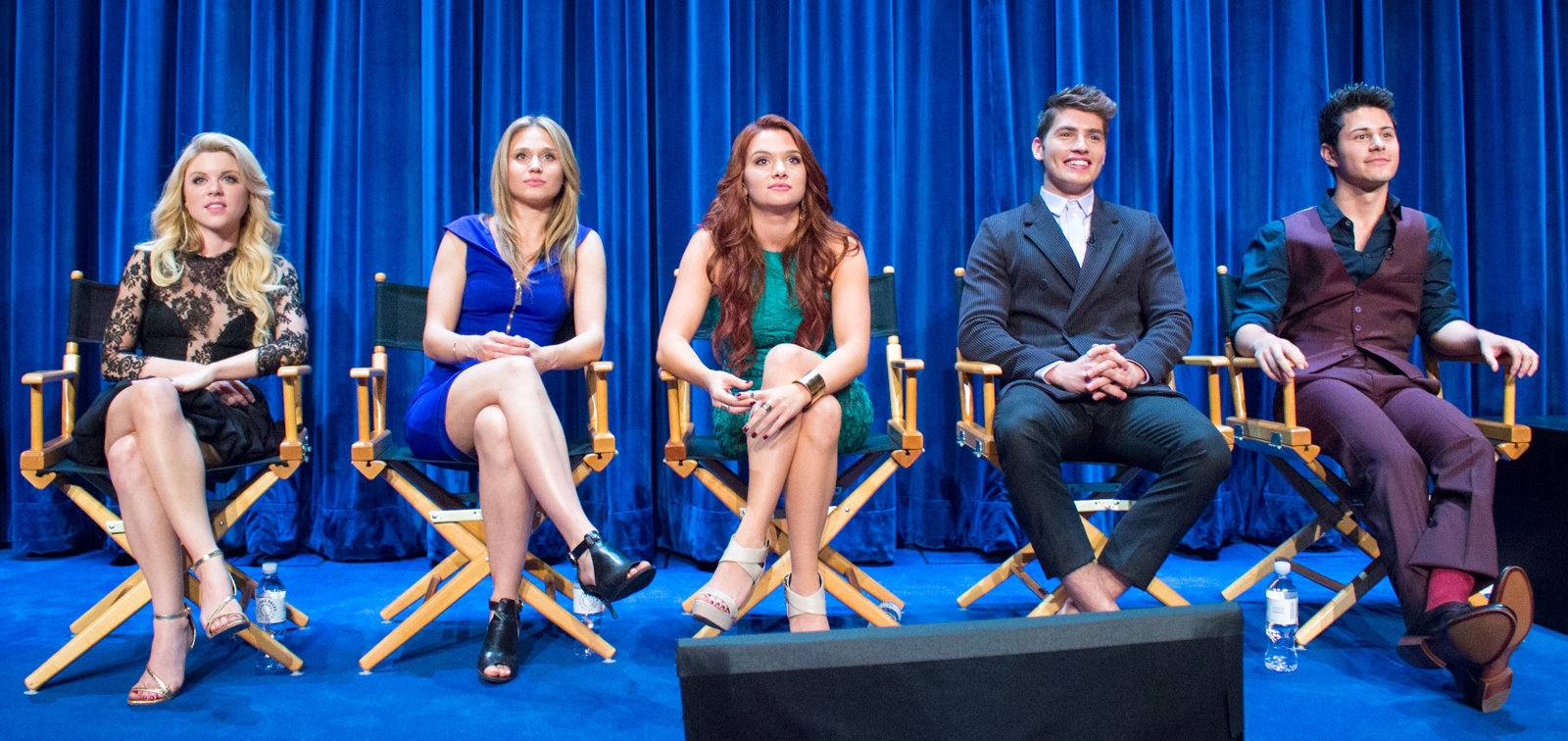
Main cast in September 2014. L to R: Bailey De Young, Rita Volk, Katie Stevens, Gregg Sulkin and Michael J. Willett

=== Main cast ===
- Rita Volk as Amy Raudenfeld, a junior at Hester High School and Karma's cynical best friend. She hesitantly agrees to Karma's plan of pretending to be lesbians for popularity, but realizes she might not actually be "faking it" after their first kiss, and, as their lie progresses, so do her romantic and sexual feelings for her best friend. Although, at first, she is not sure whether she is a lesbian, or solely attracted to Karma, she eventually decides she must move on and begins dating girls, even beginning a serious relationship, and is confused and angered by Karma's apparent jealousy. Amy also has issues with her conservative, former beauty queen mother, who has a hard time dealing with her daughter being bisexual, and who connects more to Amy's stepsister.
- Katie Stevens as Karma Ashcroft, an optimistic high school junior who wants to achieve popularity. However, she gains more than she bargained for when her latest popularity scheme (pretending to be half of her school's first openly lesbian couple) allows her best friend Amy to realize that she loves her as more than a friend. Her life becomes more complex as she carries on a secret, straight, affair with Liam Booker, one of the most popular boys at school, while simultaneously fooling everyone into thinking she and Amy are a monogamous couple. Upon discovering that Amy has true feelings for her, she tries to keep from breaking her best friend's heart, even encouraging her to date other girls. However, when Amy does find someone new, finally allowing Karma and Liam to have a happy relationship, she behaves jealously towards Amy's girlfriend.
- Gregg Sulkin as Liam Booker, Shane's best friend, a mysterious and sexy artist who is the most desired boy at the school, and becomes secretly involved with Karma. At first, he is only attracted to her because of his desire to have sex with a lesbian, but he quickly realizes that he has developed real feelings for her.
- Michael Willett as Shane Harvey, the most popular boy in school who is openly gay. He is witty, straightforward and outgoing, and the best friend of both Liam and Amy. It is Shane who initially (erroneously) outs Karma and Amy as lesbians. He is also who brings attention to Lauren being intersex, when he publicly confronts her after hearing that she secretly takes pills, drawing attention to her situation, unaware of her need to take hormones. Shane becomes Amy's confidant as her feelings towards Karma develop. By of the end of the series, he has had three major love interests: a celibate Christian named Pablo; a closeted, macho wrestler named Duke, who eventually comes out to please Shane but dumps him when he learns Shane is the one who outed him in the first place; and Noah, a trans man who Shane feels conflicted about being attracted to due to the gender he was assigned at birth.
- Bailey De Young as Lauren Cooper, Amy's stepsister, and the new girl in school. Highly conservative, she is furious and frustrated, aware that someone like her would almost certainly be highly popular in a "normal" school that didn't have such liberal-minded students. In season 2, it is revealed that she is intersex, initially a secret shared only with close friends. She faces stress as more and more students find out. Lauren becomes very close with her new stepmother, Amy's mom, after realizing they enjoy the same things, and that she relates more to her than with anyone at her school.

=== Recurring cast ===
==== Introduced in season 1 ====
- Rebecca McFarland as Farrah, Amy's mom, a local television reporter who holds conservative views and is shocked to learn of Amy's sexual orientation
- Senta Moses as Penelope Bevier, the principal of Hester High, later vice-principal after the school drug bust
- Erick Lopez as Tommy Ortega, Lauren's boyfriend
- Courtney Kato as Leila, a friend of Lauren's
- Breezy Eslin as Elizabeth, a friend of Lauren's
- Anthony Palacios as Pablo, Lauren's dance partner and Shane's ex-boyfriend
- Amy Farrington as Molly, Karma's mother
- Lance Barber as Lucas, Karma's father
- Dan Gauthier as Bruce Cooper, Lauren's father
- Courtney Henggeler as Robin Booker, Liam's sister
- August Roads as Oliver Walsh, a friend of Amy's

==== Introduced in season 2 ====
- Yvette Monreal as Reagan, Amy's ex-girlfriend
- Keith Powers as Theo, a friend of Liam and Shane's and Lauren's love interest
- Bruce Thomas as Max Booker, Liam's adoptive father
- Skyler Maxon as Duke Lewis Jr., Shane's ex-boyfriend
- Chloe Bridges as Zita Cruz, a friend of Liam's
- Bernard Curry as George Turner, the new principal of Hester High following the school drug bust
- Parker Mack as Felix Turner, a student at Hester High and the son of Principal Turner
- Ed Quinn as Hank, Amy's father
- Cameron Moulène as Wade, the show's first bisexual identified character
- Lindsey Shaw as Sasha Harvey, Shane's older sister

==== Introduced in season 3 ====
- Jordan Rodrigues as Dylan, Karma's Hawaiian boyfriend, whom she met while lifeguarding over the summer
- Elliot Fletcher as Noah, the show's first transgender character, who is a member of the band Noah's Arc, and is a love interest of Shane's
- Sophia Ali as Sabrina, a childhood friend and love interest of Amy's
- McKaley Miller as Rachel, Liam's coworker and love interest, and the daughter of a rabbi
- Alice Lee as Keiko Flynn, a friend of Lauren's

=== Guest cast ===
- Austin Lyon as Victor
- Jacquie Lee as herself
- Laverne Cox as Margot
- Fifth Harmony as a girl group
- Mary Lambert as herself
- Sofia Carson as Soleil
- Nicholas Brendon as Jackson Lee

== Broadcast ==
Faking It premiered on April 22, 2014, and ran for eight episodes. On June 9, 2014, the series was picked up for a second season of ten episodes, which premiered on September 23, 2014. This was later expanded to a twenty episode season on October 21, 2014.

== Reception ==
=== Critical response ===
Faking It received generally favorable reviews from critics, receiving a 71 score on Metacritic, as well as a 71% for season 1 on Rotten Tomatoes based on seven reviews.

CinemaBlend.com said, "About as relevant to the gay lifestyle as Modern Family, Faking It shoots for the stars, but only hits a bunch of brightly colored rainbows on "Vote for Me" posters." The New York Times wrote, "Faking It isn't anything more than a smarter-than-average high school comedy, but there's a freshness to it, perhaps because so many of the key people involved are relative newcomers." New York Daily News said, "The engine driving this show is female friendship, the kind strong enough to get you through even high school. For Amy and Karma, we want that." TV Fanatic said, "It could be an interesting twist for Amy to stop pretending to be gay and suddenly be pretending to be straight." Common Sense Media said, "The coming-of-age-and-coming-out story is certainly a time-honored one in the LGBT cinematic canon, and having both girls playing gay-for-social-cachet is an interesting farcial spin." Hollywood.com said, "Anyone following MTV's Awkward will be sure to love the new series, but even non-fans won't fake their enjoyment of the new show." Pittsburgh Post-Gazette said, "While the show's premise seems like it could be difficult to maintain, Faking It holds up in two early episodes sent for review." Boston Globe said, "Faking It is an odd, interesting, lightly subversive, and potentially offensive concoction from MTV. It's a twisted comedy that has charm, but also a premise that could be insulting if not handled intelligently." Boston Herald said, "There's something hilarious and twisted about outcasts and untouchables running a school while making some of the same mistakes their 'normal' peers made. Faking It is the real deal." Entertainment Weekly said, "Credit the winning cast, especially Volk, and executive producer Carter Covington's sweet/snarky tone for a half hour viewers won't have to pretend to love."

In an average review to the show, Philadelphia Daily News said "For Stevens' character, Karma, kissing her best friend, Amy (Volk), is a way --admittedly not the most direct way--of getting closer to Liam, a cute guy (Gregg Sulkin) with commitment issues. For Amy, though, it's more complicated, and that's where Faking It begins to seem less like a joke, as the shift in a relationship stirs up feelings that move her into the "questioning" column of LGBTQ."

=== Awards ===
Year	Award	Category	Nominee(s)	Result	Ref
2014	AfterEllen Visibility Awards	Editor's Pick for Favorite Tweeter	Yvette Monreal	Won	
2014	AfterEllen Visibility Awards	Favorite Fictional Lesbian Couple	Rita Volk / Yvette Monreal (Amy and Reagan)	Nominated	
2014	AfterEllen Visibility Awards	Favorite Lesbian/Bi Character	Rita Volk (Amy Raudenfeld)	Won	
2014	AfterEllen Visibility Awards	Favorite TV Actress	Rita Volk	Won	
2014	AfterEllen Visibility Awards	Favorite TV Comedy	Faking It	Won	
2014	Teen Choice Awards	Breakout Show	Faking It	Won	
2015	GLAAD Media Awards	Outstanding Comedy Series	Faking It	Nominated	
2015	People's Choice Awards	Favorite Cable TV Comedy	Faking It	Nominated	
2015	Teen Choice Awards	Choice Summer TV Show	Faking It	Nominated	
2015	Teen Choice Awards	Choice Summer TV Star: Male	Gregg Sulkin	Nominated	
2016	AfterEllen March Madness 2016	Best Actress in a Queer Role	Rita Volk	Nominated	
2016	The Girl Crowd — LGBT+	Favorite LGBT Ship	Karmy (Karma Ashcroft / Amy Raudenfeld)	Won	
2016	GLAAD Media Awards	Outstanding Comedy Series	Faking It	Nominated	
2016	People's Choice Awards	Favorite Cable TV Comedy	Faking It	Nominated	
