= Rebecca McFarland =

American artist and actor

- Born: April 18, 1973 (age 53); New Orleans, Louisiana
- Education: Tulane University
- Occupations: Artist; actress
- Years active: 1996–present
- Known for: Working; Faking It; Star Trek: Voyager
- Spouse: Jason Ensler (m. 2013)
- Website: rebeccamcfarland.net

Rebecca McFarland (born 18 April 1973 in New Orleans, Louisiana) is an American artist and actor.

== Early life ==
McFarland grew up in New Orleans and attended Tulane University, where she graduated with a BA in theater.

== Acting career ==
McFarland appeared as George's girlfriend on the Seinfeld episode "The Little Kicks". She starred as Val Gibson in Working from 1998–1999. She had several more appearances in series such as The Big Easy (1996), Diagnosis: Murder (1996), Star Trek: Voyager (1997), NYPD Blue (2001–2002), CSI: Crime Scene Investigation (2003), Charmed (2003), NCIS (2005), Ghost Whisperer (2010), The Mentalist (2012), and Two and a Half Men (2003–2012). She appeared on the TNT series Saving Grace, the NBC pilot Man of Your Dreams, and the CBS pilot The Eastmans. She had a recurring role on Faking It as Farrah Raudenfeld.

== Art career ==
In 2016, McFarland became a professional mixed-media portrait artist. She paints with several textural elements on canvas, cradle board, recycled materials, and vintage leather jackets.

== Filmography ==
Television

Year	Title	Role	Notes
1996	The Big Easy	Gigi	
1996	Diagnosis: Murder	Janie	
1996	Seinfeld	Anna	Episode: "The Little Kicks"
1997	Pacific Blue	Allie McNeil	
1997	Silk Stalkings	Amber	
1997	Party of Five	Francey	
1997	Total Security	Jane Oliver	
1997	Jenny	Penelope	
1997	Star Trek: Voyager	Talli	Episode: "Random Thoughts"
1997	Scream 2	Theater Girl #2	
1998	Grace Under Fire	Barbara Ann	
1998	Union Square	Loretta	
1998	Maximum Bob	Debbie Lefcowitz	
1998	The Army Show	Christine	
1998	Art House	Molly Fitzsimmons	
1998–1999	Working	Val Gibson	17 episodes
1999	Norm	Nancy	
2001	Philly	Rachel Borden	
2001	Elvis Took a Bullet	Polly	
2001–2002	NYPD Blue	Jennifer Prince/Donna Finer	
2002	Once and Again	Melissa	
2003	CSI: Crime Scene Investigation	Jason Kent's Attorney	
2003	Tremors	Dr. Ellie Bergen	
2003	Fargo	Beautician	
2003	Charmed	Lynn	
2003–2012	Two and a Half Men	Leanne	
2004	A Place Called Home	Jan Kyles	
2004	Century City	Mrs. Jansen	
2005	NCIS	Detective Rachel Rapp	
2005	Play Dates	Karen	
2006	Friday Night Lights	Susanne Derr	
2006	Hollis & Rae	Adeline	
2007	Eyes	Vanessa Leary	
2007	LA Blues	Caren	
2007–2008	The Dresden Files	Susan Rodriguez	
2008	Saving Grace	Jeannie Jenney	
2008	Man of Your Dreams	Sally	
2008	Happy Campers	Mimi	
2009	The Eastmans	Maddie Ross Eastman	
2010	Ghost Whisperer	Joan	
2010	Human Target	Rachel Applebaum	
2011	Franklin & Bash	Katherine Mack	
2012	Cupid, Inc.	Nancy	
2012	The Mentalist	Helen	
2012	Happily Divorced	Karen	
2012	The Manzanis	Karen	
2013	Cult	Teri McNabb	
2013	True Blood	Maggie Devins	
2013	Perception	Pam Carlson	
2013	Trooper	Ilene Katz-Klausner	
2013	Bones	Linda McCord	
2013	NCIS: Los Angeles	Maggie Vasile	
2014	Chelsey and Kelsey	Samantha	
2014	Major Crimes	Vanessa	
2014–2016	Faking It	Farrah Raudenfeld/Cooper	19 episodes
2015	Red Band Society	Sylvia Roth	
2016	Grey's Anatomy	Tara Parker	
