= Michael J. Willett =

American actor

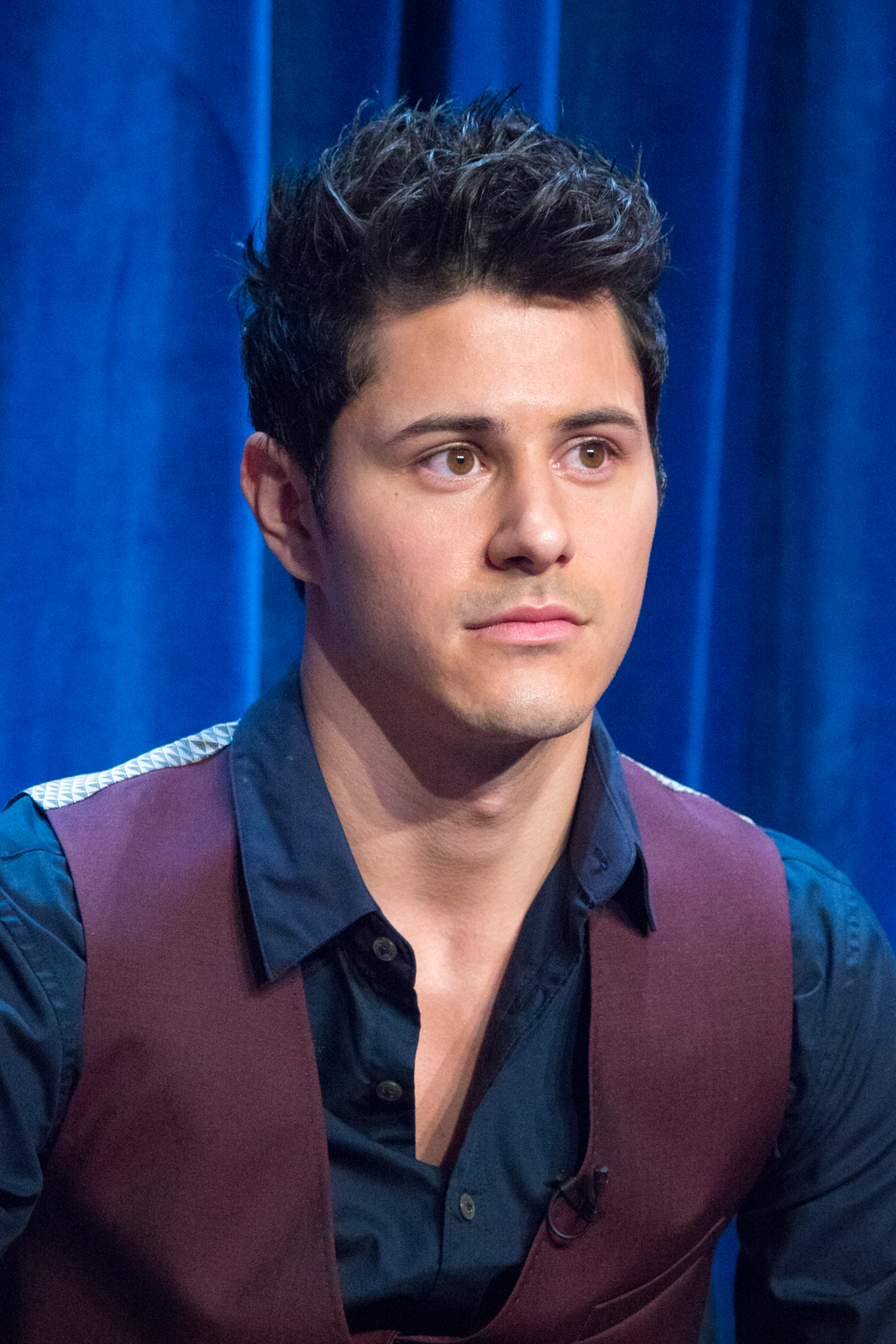
- Willett in 2014
- Born: Michael James Mansel Willett; September 11, 1989 (age 37); Fresno, California, U.S.
- Occupation: Actor
- Years active: 2002–present

Michael James Mansel Willett (born September 11, 1989) is an American actor. Willett is known most for his roles as Lionel in United States of Tara and Tanner in G.B.F.. He starred in the MTV show Faking It from 2014 until its cancellation in 2016.

== Early life ==
Willett grew up in Fresno, California, and attended Clovis West High School. From a young age he always wanted to perform, and has stated, "When I was younger I was more uncomfortable with that side of myself, being outgoing and talkative. I realized along the way that was how you get people to know you. I've grown to be a more open person."

When he was asked about playing gay characters in multiple roles, Willett responded, "I want to play all different kinds of people; gay or straight. For example, when you go in to play a serial killer, you don't question if it meets your physical or moral standards. You disregard that and play the character. I didn't question it [accepting the G.B.F role]. I want to play all different kinds of characters and hope to continue to do so."

== Career ==
Willett is also a singer, listing himself on his Twitter as a singer first and actor second. He has stated that after G.B.F he would like to start writing his own music. Willett's debut album is named Diapason, which he describes as the "full, rich, melodious outpouring of sound. That is exactly how I describe what I do."

== Personal life ==
Willett is openly gay, stating in an interview with The Advocate that, "I didn't really ever want to make it a thing ... I never saw it being something that separated me from anyone else. If anything, I found that it has given me an advantage in the industry."

== Filmography ==
=== Film ===
| Year | Title | Role | Notes |
|---|---|---|---|
| 2013 | G.B.F. | Tanner | Premiere: 2013 Tribeca Film Festival. Theatrical Release: January 14, 2014 |

=== Television ===
| Year | Title | Role | Notes |
|---|---|---|---|
| 2004 | Joan of Arcadia | Billy | Episode(s): 1 |
| 2005 | Without a Trace | Aaron | Episode(s): 1 (as Michael Willett) |
| 2010 | Cougar Town | Glee Club Member #4 | Episode: 1 |
| 2011 | Blue Mountain State | Joe Daniels | Episode(s): 1 |
| 2010–2011 | United States of Tara | Lionel Trane | Episode(s): 16 |
| 2014–2016 | Faking It | Shane Harvey | Lead role |
| 2019 | Dolly Parton's Heartstrings | Cole Evans | Episode: "Two Doors Down" |

== Discography ==
| Year | Title | Album |
|---|---|---|
| 2013 | "In Love Alone" | Diapason (Unreleased) |
| 2013 | "Burning Desire" | Diapason (Unreleased) |
| 2014 | "Started Over" | Regeneration: Phase II |
