= Bailey De Young =

American actress

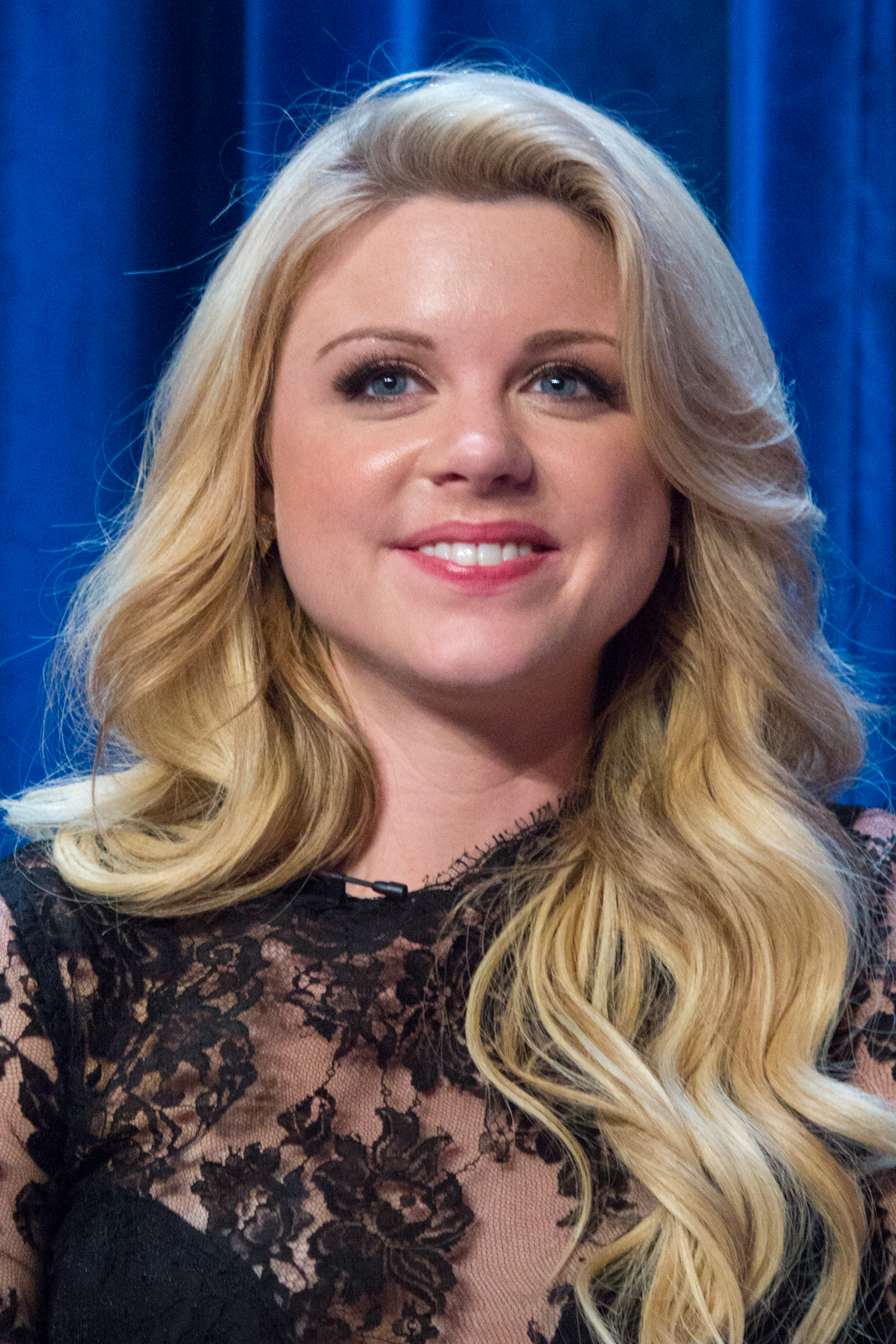
- De Young in 2014
- Born: Sacramento, California, U.S.
- Occupation: Actress
- Years active: 1996–present
- Spouse: Tyler De Young (m. 2014)
- Children: 4

Bailey De Young (née Buntain) is an American actress. She is known for playing Ginny Thompson on Bunheads, Lauren Cooper on Faking It, and Imogene Cleary on The Marvelous Mrs. Maisel.

== Career ==
De Young is a native of Sacramento, California. She began studying dancing around the age of seven, with a focus in jazz, tap and ballet. She is also a trained soprano, with various theater credits. After graduating from the American Musical and Dramatic Academy, she landed the role of Ginny Thompson on the ABC Family series Bunheads. In 2014, she made a guest appearance on the sitcom Baby Daddy as Bailey, and Jenna Taylor on The Middle. In 2014, she was cast in the MTV sitcom Faking It as Lauren. She then went on to play Imogene Cleary on the Amazon Prime series The Marvelous Mrs. Maisel.

== Personal life ==
She and musician Tyler De Young were married on August 3, 2014. They had their first child, a daughter, in September 2018. In July 2020, their second child, a boy, was born. In December 2021, she announced they were expecting their third child, another boy, who was born in May 2022. Their fourth child, a daughter, was born in April 2024.

== Filmography ==
Television roles
Year	Title	Role	Notes
2012–2013	Bunheads	Virginia "Ginny" Thompson	Main role
2012–2013	The Middle	Jenna Taylor	Episodes: "From Orson with Love", "The Second Act"
2014	Baby Daddy	Bailey	Episode: "The Wingmom"
2014	Petals on the Wind	Carrie Dollanganger	Television film
2014–2016	Faking It	Lauren Cooper	Main role
2015	The Murder Pact	Poppy	Television film
2016	Gilmore Girls: A Year in the Life	Heidi	Episode: "Summer"
2017–2023	The Marvelous Mrs. Maisel	Imogene Cleary	Recurring role, 20 episodes
