= Rita Volk =

American actress

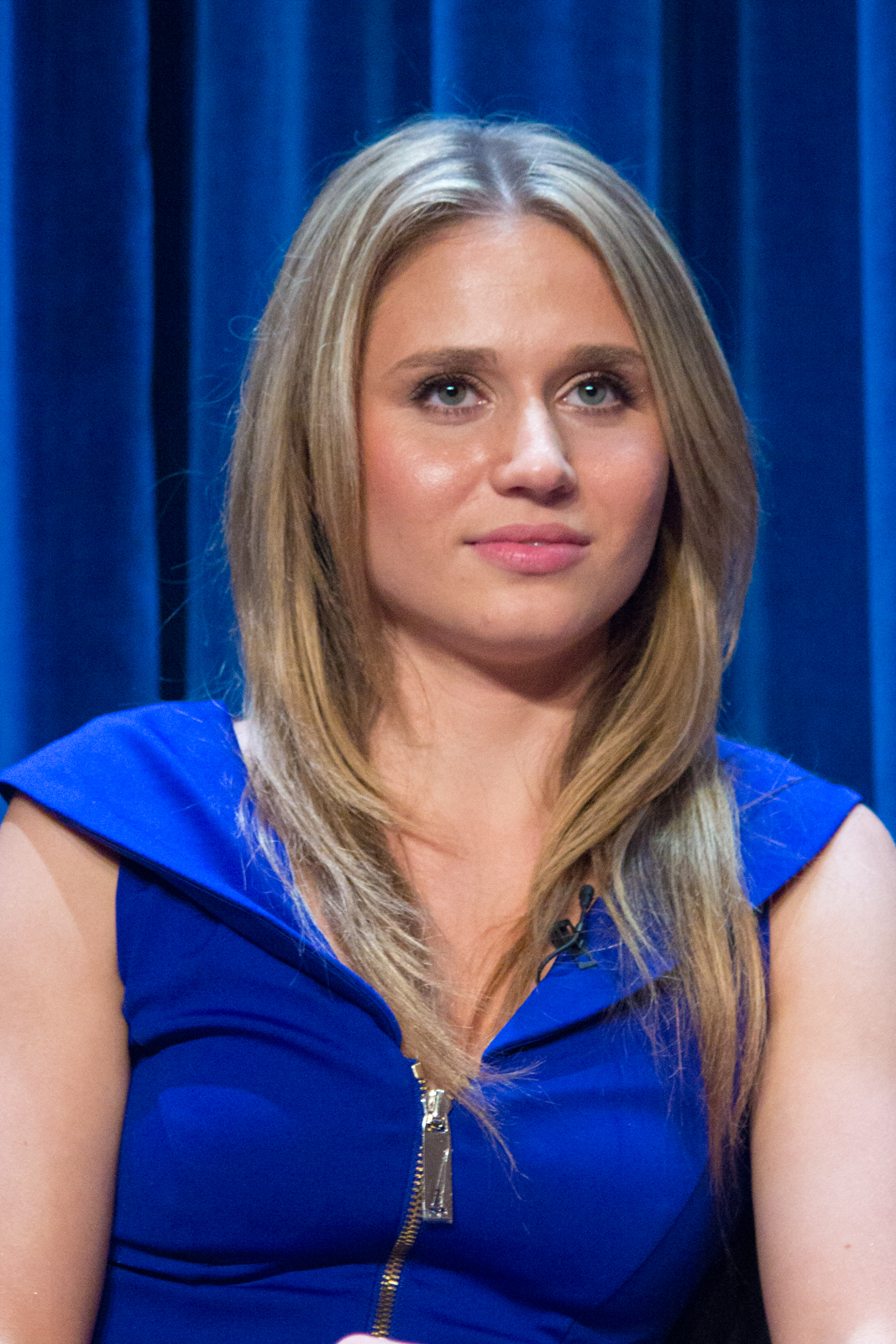
- Volk at the 2014 PaleyFest Fall TV Premiere presentation for MTV's Faking It
- Born: Margarita Volkovinskaya; September 3, 1990 (age 36); Tashkent, Uzbek SSR, USSR
- Education: Duke University
- Occupation: Actress
- Years active: 2012–present

Margarita Volkovinskaya (Russian: Маргарита Волковинская, born September 3, 1990), known professionally as Rita Volk, is an Uzbek-American actress. She is known for her role as Amy Raudenfeld in the MTV romantic comedy series Faking It.

== Early life ==
Volk was born in Tashkent, Uzbek SSR, Soviet Union. She moved with her family to San Francisco when she was six years old. She was approached by a modeling scout, and after auditioning for commercials Volk decided that she wanted to continue to pursue acting.

Volk attended Lowell High School in San Francisco. Through high school, she acted in school plays and further explored her burgeoning love for film which she claims helped her and her family acclimatize to American English and culture. In 2005, she won the SFUSD High School Poet Laureate award. After high school, Volk attended Duke University, where she graduated with a degree in psychology on a pre-medical track. During college, she acted in student films and was a member of Inside Joke, Duke's sketch comedy troupe.

== Career ==
In 2013 Volk was cast in the pilot for the MTV comedy series Faking It, playing Amy, one of the series' lead roles; MTV ordered Faking It to series in October 2013. For Faking It, Volk originally tried out for the role of co-lead Karma, not Amy. In 2015 she joined the cast of the dramedy film Almost Friends. She also appears in the John Carpenter-directed 2017 music video for the theme to his earlier film, Christine.

== Filmography ==
=== Film ===
Year	Title	Role	Notes
2014	The Hungover Games	Katnip Everlean	
2016	Almost Friends	Heather	
2018	Summer Days, Summer Nights	Winky	
2020	We Still Say Grace	Sarah	

=== Television ===
Year	Title	Role	Notes
2012	Rizzoli & Isles	Lea Babic	Episode: "Cuts Like A Knife"
2013	Major Crimes	Briana Mathis	Episode: "Backfire"
2014–16	Faking It	Amy Raudenfeld	Lead role; 38 episodes
2016	Young Hollywood	Herself	Episode: "Faking It Cast's Beauty & Fashion Tips"
2016–17	Relationship Status	Erin	8 episodes
2020	Condor	Polina	Recurring character (season 2)
2023	Dr. Death	Yulia Tuulik	Recurring character (season 2)
2025	The Cleaning Lady	Hunter Heller	Episode: "Le Medecin"

=== Music videos ===
Year	Title	Artist	Notes
2016	"Utopian Facade"	John Carpenter	Single release to Carpenter's Lost Themes II
2017	"Christine"	John Carpenter	The theme for film Christine as a part of Carpenter's Anthology: Movie Themes 1974-1998
