= Carter Covington =

American television producer and writer

- Occupations: Show creator, screenwriter, producer, showrunner
- Years active: 2006–present
- Spouse: Patrick Sean Smith (m. 2008)
- Children: 1

Carter Covington (c. 1973) is an American television show creator, writer, story editor and producer. He is known for his screenwriting on two television series which aired on the ABC Family network: Greek and 10 Things I Hate About You. Covington was the showrunner for the first season of The CW series Charmed.

== Early life ==
Covington grew up in Winston-Salem, North Carolina. The son of Marie and Butch Covington, he graduated from R. J. Reynolds High School in 1991. Covington attended the University of Virginia, where he received his degree in 1995 after studying foreign affairs and Spanish. After college, Covington was undecided about a career path. He taught English in Mexico and then worked as an advertising executive before studying entertainment business at UCLA's Business School, where he graduated in 2001. This was followed by a stint as a dog-walker. It wasn't until he met a screenwriter for the TV show Smallville that he said he found a career that interested him.

== Career ==
Covington has been involved in more than 17 episodes of Greek, some of which he co-wrote with fellow University of Virginia graduate Amy Rardin. A Delta Tau Delta fraternity alumnus, Covington's own college experiences were an inspiration for his writing on Greek.

Covington is a self-professed fan of the original 1999 film 10 Things I Hate About You. He often collaborated with original film director Gil Junger on various ABC Family projects, where he regularly quizzed Junger for information about the movie. These discussions with Junger, coupled with Covington's desire to create a "reimagined" TV version of the movie, led to the creation of a pilot episode of 10 Things I Hate About You, which Junger directed. On July 7, 2009, the series premiere brought in 1.60 million viewer, a record for a 30-minute comedy debut on the ABC Family network. The series was canceled after one twenty-episode season.

In 2018 Covington became the showrunner for The CW television series Charmed after it was picked up to series, in order to help executive producers Jessica O'Toole and Amy Rardin, neither of whom had run a show before. He departed the show after its first season and was replaced by married duo Liz Kruger and Craig Shapiro.

== Personal life ==
Covington is openly gay. He married Patrick Sean Smith, the creator of Greek, in Maui on October 25, 2008. They have one adopted son, Cormac.

== Filmography ==
=== Television shows ===
- Just a Phase (2006) TV pilot, creator
- Greek (2007–09, 2011) writer, producer, executive story editor
- 10 Things I Hate About You (2009–10) creator, writer, executive producer
- Hart of Dixie (2012–13), writer
- Faking It (2014–16) "Developed by," executive producer, writer
- Charmed (2018–19) showrunner, executive producer, writer

=== Television movies ===
- Happy Campers (2008) creator, writer
