= American Idol Season 9 =

Compilation album by American Idol ninth season finalists
- Released: May 11, 2010
- Recorded: 2010
- Studios: Capitol; Westlake; Record Plant; Little Big Room
- Genres: Pop, rock
- Length: 36:08
- Label: RCA Records
- Producers: Rickey Minor, Brad Gilderman

American Idol chronology
American Idol Season 8: The 5 Song EP (2009)	American Idol Season 9 (2010)

American Idol Season 9 is a compilation album and contains one cover song from each of the top ten finalists during the ninth season of the television show American Idol and was released on May 11, 2010. It debuted at number 77 on the Billboard 200.

== Track listing ==
No.	Title	Performer	Length
1.	"Treat Her Like a Lady" (Cornelius Brothers & Sister Rose)	Lee DeWyze	3:08
2.	"Forever" (Chris Brown)	Andrew Garcia	4:13
3.	"Paint It Black" (The Rolling Stones)	Siobhan Magnus	3:50
4.	"Me and Bobby McGee" (Roger Miller)	Crystal Bowersox	3:55
5.	"Jealous Guy" (John Lennon)	Casey James	3:13
6.	"I Don't Want to Miss a Thing" (Aerosmith)	Aaron Kelly	4:24
7.	"Ready for Love" (India.Arie)	Michael Lynche	4:25
8.	"Under My Thumb" (The Rolling Stones)	Tim Urban	3:15
9.	"Play with Fire" (The Rolling Stones)	Didi Benami	2:19
10.	"Let It Be" (The Beatles)	Katie Stevens	3:26
