= Didi Benami =

American singer-songwriter (born 1986)

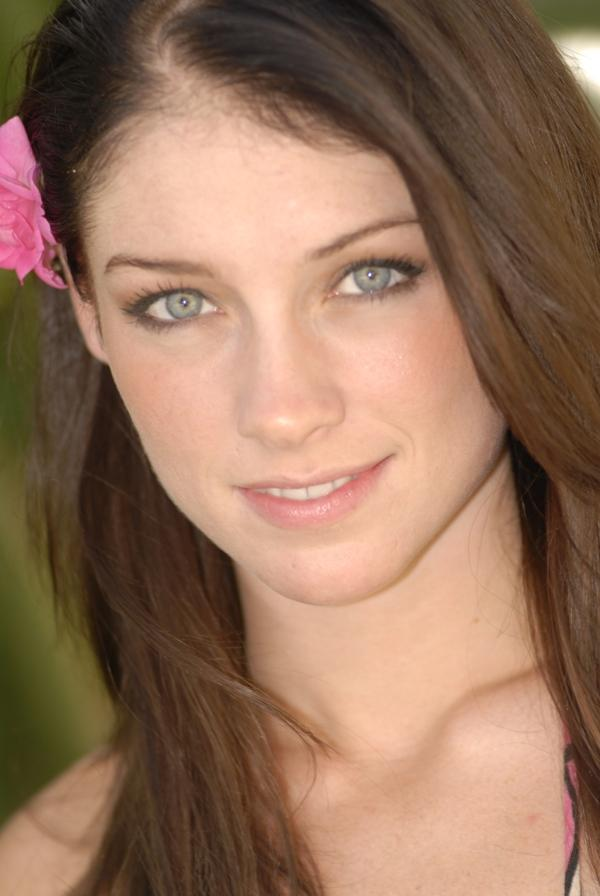
- Benami in 2007 prior to American Idol

Background information
- Born: Vered Benami; October 25, 1986 (age 39)
- Origin: Knoxville, Tennessee, U.S.
- Genres: Acoustic rock, pop
- Occupation(s): Singer, songwriter
- Instrument(s): Vocals, guitar
- Years active: 2010–present
- Labels: Independent
- Website: officialdidibenami.com

Vered "Didi" Benami (Hebrew: ורד "דידי" בן עמי; born October 25, 1986) is an American singer-songwriter and television host. After placing tenth on the ninth season of American Idol, she released her debut single, "Gasoline", in 2012 and the album Reverie in 2014. In 2023, she began co-hosting the AXS series Banded.

== Early life and education ==
Benami was born in New York before moving to Tennessee at the age of seven. Her father is Israeli and her first name, Vered (ורד) means "rose" in Hebrew. She spent most of her formative years in Knoxville, Tennessee. Benami was raised Jewish.

Benami is a 2005 graduate of West High School. She started singing in the fifth grade. In school, she performed the role of Marty in the musical "Grease" and frequently performed the national anthem in front of various crowds.

On American Idol, Benami said she was a cheerleader and mascot at Bearden Middle School.

Benami attended Nashville's Belmont University before moving to California. This move followed the death of her close friend and roommate, Rebecca Joy Lear, in an automobile accident driving from Nashville to her Kansas home during the Christmas holiday of her first year. They wrote songs together, mostly on Lear's album, but Benami recently said that she would pursue Lear's music first and would most likely upload Benami version of Lear's songs.

== American Idol ==
Benami auditioned for American Idol in Los Angeles, California, where she has lived for four years. She has credited her friend, Rebecca Joy Lear, as one of the reasons she auditioned for American Idol.

At Benami's audition she sang The Beatles' song "Hey Jude". The judges all loved her performance, including guest judge Avril Lavigne. She became a front-runner in the competition following her well-praised performance of Katharine McPhee's song "Terrified" (co-written by Idol judge Kara DioGuardi) on the first solo of Hollywood Week, where Simon Cowell said "she was good". During the group week of Hollywood week Benami's group sang Alicia Keys' "No One". On the second solo performance of Hollywood week, she sang Sarah McLachlan's "Angel".

In the top 24 performances, Benami sang Ingrid Michaelson's "The Way I Am" where the judges did not love her rendition of it, saying she has a good voice but it was rather "sound-alike". In the top 20 performance, she sang Bill Withers's "Lean on Me", where once again the judges did not love her performance, with Randy Jackson saying it was pitchy and Simon Cowell said it was like a screeching cat. During the top 16 performances, however, she made a comeback with the song Fleetwood Mac's "Rhiannon", with Kara DioGuardi adding that that performance has the "singer/songwriter" vibe that she loves on Benami's performance of "Terrified".

On March 31, 2010, Benami was eliminated from the competition and finished in 10th place. Despite an encore of "Rhiannon" for the judges' save, the judges chose not to save her, though, Simon Cowell stated it was "a million times better" than her performance the night before.

=== Performances/results ===
Week #	Theme	Song choice	Original artist	Order #	Result
Audition	Auditioner's Choice	"Hey Jude"	The Beatles	N/A	Advanced
Hollywood	First Solo	"Terrified"	Katharine McPhee	N/A	Advanced
Hollywood	Group Performance	"No One"	Alicia Keys	N/A	Advanced
Hollywood	Second Solo	"Angel"	Sarah McLachlan	N/A	Advanced
Top 24 (12 Women)	Billboard Hot 100 Hits	"The Way I Am"	Ingrid Michaelson	9	Safe
Top 20 (10 Women)	Billboard Hot 100 Hits	"Lean on Me"	Bill Withers	5	Safe
Top 16 (8 Women)	Billboard Hot 100 Hits	"Rhiannon"	Fleetwood Mac	5	Safe
Top 12	The Rolling Stones	"Play with Fire"	The Rolling Stones	2	Safe
Top 11	Billboard #1 Hits	"You're No Good"	Betty Everett	10	Safe
Top 10	R&B/Soul	"What Becomes of the Brokenhearted"	Jimmy Ruffin	4	Eliminated

== American Idols LIVE! Tour 2010 ==
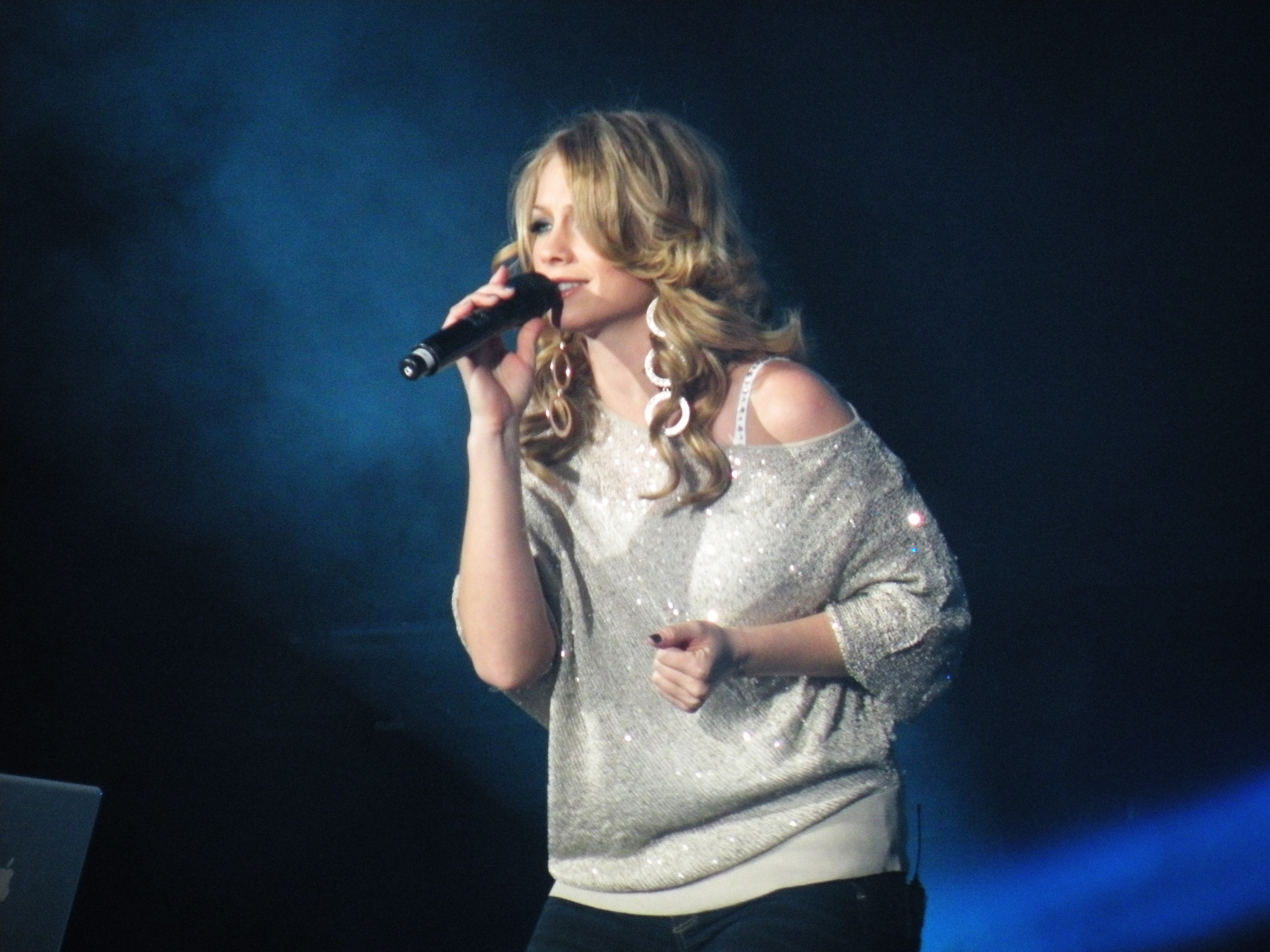
Benami performing on the American Idol Live tour in Denver, Colorado on August 23, 2010

On the American Idols Live! Tour 2010, Benami sang two songs, Katharine McPhee's "Terrified" and Kyler England's "Lay It on Me". She also sang in the group performance of Miley Cyrus's "The Climb" with Aaron Kelly, Katie Stevens, Andrew Garcia, Tim Urban, and Siobhan Magnus.

Benami appeared with Jason Reeves on Jason's Official Twitter page where he thanked her for giving life to the song. They later sang "Terrified" with Jason on the guitar.

Promising to fulfill Rebecca's musical dream, Benami released and sang her version of Rebecca's songs "Lullaby" and "No Destination" on her official Myspace page.

== Post-Idol career ==
Benami attended interviews such as The Ellen DeGeneres Show after her elimination. She also appeared on various other shows during her post-Idol tour including the Late Show with David Letterman, The Today Show, and Access Hollywood. On The Ellen DeGeneres Show, The Late Show, and Access Hollywood, Benami performed the Kara DioGuardi-penned "Terrified", her song made famous from American Idol's Hollywood Week.

A track Benami recorded prior to participating on American Idol, "Sweet Rain", was uploaded onto YouTube after she was voted off the show. The track was co-written by Rocco Guarino, Ryan Gonzalez, and Joseph "Panhead" Peck, as well as, produced by Rocco Guarino, who also produced American Idol alumna Amanda Overmyer's debut album. Benami stated via her Twitter page that she will be collaborating with producer Kyler England in the studio on April 6, 2010. On April 7, Benami had an interview with OK! Magazine. She stated, "I want to have a record out by this time next year. By the end of the year is my goal, but I don't know how logistics will work out after the tour. I already started writing some songs, so I don't know if I could get an EP out by the end of the year and then do a record the following year. I definitely want to do a compilation of Rebecca's music. I would eventually like to act, that would be fun. I would love to do sitcoms, like Friends. I love Jennifer Aniston, I think she's amazing. I would eventually like to write a book about all my experiences since I moved to L.A. About losing a friend, being an inspiration and turning something bad into something good."

In mid-April, Benami volunteered with '"Idol Gives Back" along with various past Idol contestants including Elliott Yamin. They packed food for local underprivileged families. She stated via Twitter that she is currently practicing for the upcoming American Idol summer tour for which she will be performing along with the remainder of the top ten finalists.

Benami appeared as a guest in the If I Can Dream house. She sang Alicia Keys's No One with Katie Stevens, Andrew Garcia, and Siobhan Magnus; and Radiohead's Creep, with Stevens and Magnus. She also sang Terrified inside the house, teaching it to former American Idol contestant and If I Can Dream castmate Alex Lambert.

Benami sang the National Anthem at the 2011 NBA Playoffs in Orlando, Florida, on April 19, 2011, during the first-round game between the Orlando Magic and the Atlanta Hawks.

Benami sang the national anthem and God Bless America during the 7th inning stretch for the Los Angeles Dodgers on May 30, 2012.

Benami released her debut single, Gasoline, in May 2012. The song was written by Benami with Justin Gray and Chris Seefried; it was produced by Seefried. The song was not included on an album.

Benami released a duet with Keaton Simons, If I Hadn't Forgotten, recorded at Revolver Studios in fall of 2011.

Benami portrays the titular character in the music video for "Hurricane" by Theory of a Deadman.

In May 2014, Benami released the album Reverie. The album was crowdfunded through PledgeMusic and produced by Billy Mohler. "Watching and Waiting" was released as the first single from Reverie in January 2014. It was written by Benami with Mohler and Jordan Lawhead and was featured on an episode of American Idol's thirteenth season. "Trouble" was released as the second single from Reverie in March 2014. A music video was released for "Trouble", which was directed by Nicholes Miltello. In 2020, Fred Bronson of Billboard called the song "Picture Perfect" from Reverie an "overlooked gem" that "should have been...a hit".

In 2023, Benami began co-hosting the music competition television series Banded with Brandon Jenner. The series airs on AXS and premiered on May 13, 2023. It was originally announced in late 2022 under the title Project Supergroup and was set to air on MTV before premiering on AXS instead.

== Discography ==
=== Albums ===
Year	Title
2014	Reverie

=== Singles ===
Year	Title	Album
2012	"Gasoline"	Non-album single
2014	"Watching and Waiting"	Reverie
2014	"Trouble"	Reverie
