= Lacey Brown =

American singer-songwriter

- Born: Lacey Elizabeth Brown; August 13, 1985 (age 41); Amarillo, Texas, United States
- Genres: Christian, folk, pop, rock, country
- Occupation: Singer
- Instruments: Vocals, violin
- Years active: 2009–present
- Label: LEB Records

Lacey Elizabeth Brown (born August 13, 1985) is an American singer-songwriter and artist from Amarillo, Texas, who was the twelfth place finalist on the ninth season of American Idol. Brown released her debut EP Let It Go on May 31, 2011.

== Early life ==
Born on August 13, 1985, Lacey Elizabeth Brown is the daughter of the pastors of Victory Church, a local Christian Church, in Amarillo. There, she served as Venue (Victory's college-aged group) director and taught civics and Christian values to Victory's internship students. During her childhood, she learned how to play the violin. She also spent time in Tulsa, Oklahoma, where she had Bible schooling. Her education includes studying art. A memorable anecdote of hers include a memory when she was a very young child, when she first heard Patsy Cline, one of her musical inspirations.

Her musical influences include folk and country, as well as rock music, such as Lady Antebellum, Kings of Leon, Coldplay, and U2, apart from Patsy Cline, Joni Mitchell, Dolly Parton, and Pete Yorn.

== American Idol ==
Brown initially auditioned for the eighth season of American Idol, where she made it into the Top 54 of the Hollywood rounds but was cut prior to the Top 36 in favor of contestant Megan Joy, after a sing-off. Brown later auditioned in Orlando, Florida with the song "Over the Rainbow", from The Wizard of Oz, by Judy Garland. The judges all loved her performance, including guest judge Kristin Chenoweth, and she made it through to the next round. During Hollywood week, her performance of "What a Wonderful World" was featured as a montage for contestants who made it to the Top 24. She performed "Landslide" on the first night of the semi-finals but did not impress the judges. The judges, later, gave a negative critique on her performance of "Kiss Me" by Sixpence None the Richer during the second week. Despite this, it was well received by the band's lead singer, Leigh Nash. Her cover of Brandi Carlile's "The Story", on the final night before the finals, was considered to be an improvement compared to her past performances. Brown eventually made it to the Top 12.

Brown's rendition of "Ruby Tuesday" by The Rolling Stones (she stated that her version is the one by Melanie Safka), according to the judges, "lacked energy" but Simon Cowell added that there was nothing wrong with her vocals. The following day, Brown was eliminated from the show on March 17, 2010. During the night of her elimination, the song "What a Wonderful World" was played at the beginning of the episode, with a montage of the Top 12's journey, setting the tone for her elimination. That night, the Judge's Save was reintroduced (which was also present in season 8). Despite her effort with another performance of "The Story", the judges chose not to save her. Her elimination stirred up controversy after Ryan Seacrest tweeted the results. This caused anger among the fans of the show and as a result, the show had "the smallest audience among 18–49-year-olds for a regularly scheduled in-season episode in "Idol" history". Because she fell short of the top 10, she and Paige Miles will not be on the American Idol 2010 summer tour.

Brown thanked her fans for their support and plans to return to her hometown, after doing interviews in New York City. She says she plans to pursue acting (from a criticism to her by Simon Cowell) as well as a career in music. In her final moments on the show, she said she might pursue country music although her MySpace page lists "pop" and "folk" as her genres. A notable line of Brown in the show was: "You've got to take no's and turn them into yes'es"

=== Performances/results ===
| Week # | Theme | Song choice | Original artist | Order # | Result |
|---|---|---|---|---|---|
| Audition | Auditioner's Choice | "Over the Rainbow" | Judy Garland | N/A | Advanced |
| Hollywood | First Solo | "First Day of My Life" | Bright Eyes | N/A | Advanced |
| Hollywood | Group Performance | "Get Ready" | The Temptations | N/A | Advanced |
| Hollywood | Second Solo | "What a Wonderful World" | Louis Armstrong | N/A | Advanced |
| Top 24 (12 Women) | Billboard Hot 100 Hits | "Landslide" | Fleetwood Mac | 7 | Safe |
| Top 20 (10 Women) | Billboard Hot 100 Hits | "Kiss Me" | Sixpence None the Richer | 3 | Safe |
| Top 16 (8 Women) | Billboard Hot 100 Hits | "The Story" | Brandi Carlile | 3 | Safe |
| Top 12 | The Rolling Stones | "Ruby Tuesday" | The Rolling Stones | 4 | Eliminated |

== Post-Idol career ==
After her elimination, Brown attended several media interviews with Entertainment Weekly, USA Today, The Los Angeles Times, People, several Fox affiliates, MTV, E!, with Ryan Seacrest on his radio show (On Air with Ryan Seacrest), with Ellen DeGeneres on The Ellen DeGeneres Show, along with several in New York City, including the Wendy Williams Show and the Late Show with David Letterman, where she performed "What a Wonderful World". Among the finalists, she has stated that her closest friends are Paige Miles and Lee DeWyze although she is friends with all of them including Siobhan Magnus and Katie Stevens. She has stated in these interviews that she is planning to continue pursuing her career in music but she is also open to any offers that may come to her. She moved to Nashville, Tennessee in February 2011. She released an EP, "Let It Go on May 31, 2011. Brown is the assistant worship leader at Crossland Community Church in Bowling Green, Kentucky.

=== "Let It Go" ===
Brown's EP "Let It Go" with 5 songs on it, was released on May 31, 2011 on the LEB Record Label.
