= Moonbaby =

Moonbaby may refer to:

- Moonbaby, early alias of Miranda Cooper (born 1975), English singer and songwriter
- Moonbaby (album), an album by Siobhan Magnus
- Moon Baby, a song by hard rock band Godsmack from their 1998 self-titled album.

== See also ==
- MoonBabies, an album by Planet X
- Moonbabies (band), a Swedish band
