= Moonbaby (album) =

Studio album by Siobhan Magnus
- Released: January 22, 2012
- Genre: Alternative rock, indie rock
- Length: 48:42
- Label: Snotface Records
- Producer: Michael Flanders

Moonbaby is the debut studio album by American singer and songwriter Siobhan Magnus. The album was released on January 1, 2012.

== Background ==
After the end of the American Idols LIVE! Tour 2010, Magnus returned to her alternative rock band Lunar Valve, and recorded a three-track EP which was released in February 2011.

The album was originally announced for release on October 31, 2011, but was postponed after interest from a major label. The album was eventually released on Snotface Records, after being recorded with Pacific International Music, and was produced by Michael Flanders, who also co-wrote five of the album's songs.

1,000 pre-release signed copies were made available through her official website in December 2011. Six song teasers were released on December 5, 2011, to SoundCloud.

== Album art ==
The art and packaging were designed by Magnus and Tony Raine. The art on the CD is of the lunar phase.

== Singles ==
- Beatrice Dream was released on May 1, 2011. The song is named after Shakespeare's character from "Much Ado About Nothing". The official YouTube video has 17,250 views.
- Black Doll was released on October 3, 2011. The song is inspired by Edward Gorey. The official YouTube video has 89,000 views.

== Track listing ==
No.	Title	Writer(s)	Length
1.	"Black Doll"	Siobhan Magnus, Michael Flanders, M. Dawn	4:02
2.	"Escape Goat"	Magnus, Chaise Flanders	2:59
3.	"Hollywood Carousel (Under-Underground)"	Magnus, M. Flanders, Dawn	4:49
4.	"Eulogy"	Magnus, C. Flanders, B. Flanders	4:22
5.	"Pure Inspiration"	Magnus, C. Flanders	3:59
6.	"Little Blue Pill"	Magnus, C. Flanders, Dawn	4:33
7.	"Beatrice Dream"	Magnus, C. Flanders, Dawn	3:37
8.	"Big Collapse"	Magnus, M. Flanders, Dawn	4:14
9.	"Moonbaby"	Magnus, M. Flanders	5:36
10.	"Always Thinking"	Magnus, M. Flanders	5:13
11.	"Nothing Compares 2 U"	Prince	5:25
Total length:			48:42
