= American Idols Live! Tour 2010 =

2010 summer concert tour

- Tour by American Idol
- Top row: Siobhan Magnus, Lee DeWyze; Middle row: Didi Benami, Andrew Garcia, Casey James, Tim Urban; Bottom row: Michael Lynche, Crystal Bowersox, Katie Stevens, Aaron Kelly
- Start date: July 1, 2010
- End date: August 31, 2010
- No. of shows: 44

American Idol concert chronology
- American Idols Live! Tour 2009 (2009); American Idols Live! Tour 2010 (2010); American Idols Live! Tour 2011 (2011)

The American Idols Live! Tour 2010 was a summer concert tour in the United States and Canada that featured the Top 10 contestants of the ninth season of American Idol. The 44 date tour started in Auburn Hills and ended in Indianapolis.

The tour was sponsored by M&M's Pretzel Chocolate Candies. The tour was promoted by Live Nation for the first time after a seven-year stint with AEG Live. The show was produced and directed by Raj Kapoor who was also responsible for the 2008 and 2009 Idols tour shows.

== Performers ==
Lee DeWyze (Winner)	Crystal Bowersox (2nd place)
Casey James (3rd place)	Michael Lynche (4th place)
Aaron Kelly (5th place)	Siobhan Magnus (6th place)
Tim Urban (7th place)	Katie Stevens (8th place)
Andrew Garcia (9th place)	Didi Benami (10th place)

== Set list ==
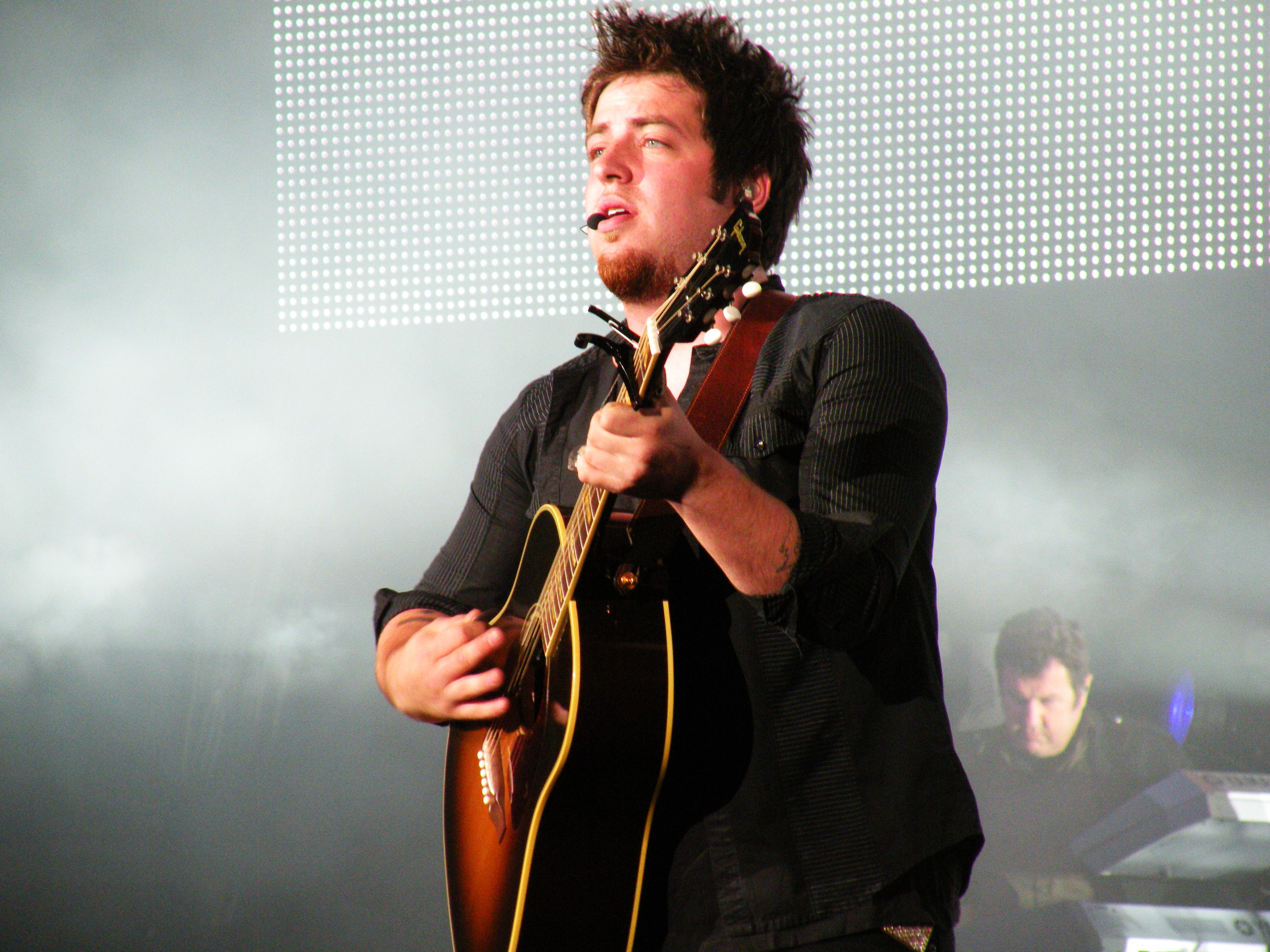
Lee DeWyze performing on tour

- Didi Benami - "Lay It On Me" (Kyler England) and "Terrified" (Katharine McPhee)
- Andrew Garcia - "Straight Up" (Paula Abdul) and "Sunday Morning" (Maroon 5)
- Katie Stevens - "Here We Go Again" (Demi Lovato) and "Fighter" (Christina Aguilera)
- Tim Urban - "Better Days" (Goo Goo Dolls) and "Viva la Vida" (Coldplay)
- Siobhan Magnus - "Paint It, Black" (The Rolling Stones), "Spiderwebs" (No Doubt) and "Stockholm Syndrome" (Muse)
- Aaron Kelly - "Somebody Like You" (Keith Urban), "Walking in Memphis" (Marc Cohn), and "Fast Cars and Freedom" (Rascal Flatts)
- Benami, Garcia, Stevens, Urban, Magnus, and Kelly - "The Climb" (Miley Cyrus)

Intermission

- Michael Lynche - "This Woman's Work" (Kate Bush), "Ready for Love" (India.Arie) and "My Love" (Justin Timberlake)
- Casey James - "I Got Mine" (The Black Keys), "Don't!" (Shania Twain) "Have You Ever Really Loved a Woman?" (Bryan Adams) with Michael Lynche and "It's All Over Now" (The Rolling Stones)
- Crystal Bowersox - "What's Up?" (4 Non Blondes), "Come to My Window" (Melissa Etheridge), "Up to the Mountain" (Patty Griffin) and "Piece of My Heart" (Janis Joplin).
- Lee DeWyze - "Beautiful Day" (U2), "Rocket Man" (Elton John), "Hallelujah" (Leonard Cohen), "Treat Her Like a Lady" (Cornelius Brothers & Sister Rose), and "Use Somebody" (Kings of Leon)
- Top 10 song: It's My Life (Bon Jovi), "My Life Would Suck Without You" (Kelly Clarkson)

== Tour dates ==
Date	City	Country	Venue
July 1, 2010	Auburn Hills	United States	The Palace of Auburn Hills
July 2, 2010 (Note: This concert was part of Summerfest.)	Milwaukee	United States	Marcus Amphitheater
July 3, 2010	Grand Rapids	United States	Van Andel Arena
July 5, 2010	Hamilton	Canada	Copps Coliseum
July 7, 2010	Wantagh	United States	Nikon at Jones Beach Theater
July 9, 2010	Bridgeport	United States	Arena at Harbor Yard
July 10, 2010	Atlantic City	United States	Mark G. Etess Arena
July 11, 2010	Philadelphia	United States	Wells Fargo Center
July 13, 2010	Uncasville	United States	Mohegan Sun Arena
July 14, 2010	Manchester	United States	Verizon Wireless Arena
July 15, 2010	Hershey	United States	Giant Center
July 17, 2010	Albany	United States	Times Union Center
July 18, 2010	Mansfield	United States	Comcast Center
July 20, 2010	Newark	United States	Prudential Center
July 21, 2010	Burgettstown	United States	First Niagara Pavilion
July 23, 2010	Bristow	United States	Jiffy Lube Live
July 24, 2010	Baltimore	United States	1st Mariner Arena
July 25, 2010	Charlotte	United States	Verizon Wireless Amphitheatre
July 27, 2010	Columbus	United States	Nationwide Arena
July 28, 2010	Knoxville	United States	Thompson–Boling Arena
July 29, 2010	Virginia Beach	United States	Virginia Beach Amphitheater
July 31, 2010	Lexington	United States	Rupp Arena
August 1, 2010	Duluth	United States	Arena at Gwinnett Center
August 3, 2010	Sunrise	United States	BankAtlantic Center
August 4, 2010	Tampa	United States	St. Pete Times Forum
August 7, 2010	The Woodlands	United States	Cynthia Woods Mitchell Pavilion
August 8, 2010	Tulsa	United States	BOK Center
August 9, 2010	Dallas	United States	American Airlines Center
August 12, 2010	Phoenix	United States	US Airways Center
August 13, 2010	Los Angeles	United States	Staples Center
August 14, 2010	Mountain View	United States	Shoreline Amphitheatre
August 16, 2010	San Diego	United States	Viejas Arena
August 17, 2010	Anaheim	United States	Honda Center
August 18, 2010	Sacramento	United States	ARCO Arena
August 20, 2010	Seattle	United States	KeyArena
August 21, 2010	Portland	United States	Rose Garden
August 23, 2010	Greenwood Village	United States	Comfort Dental Amphitheatre
August 25, 2010	St. Louis	United States	Scottrade Center
August 26, 2010	Des Moines	United States	Wells Fargo Arena
August 27, 2010	Minneapolis	United States	Target Center
August 28, 2010	Chicago	United States	United Center
August 29, 2010	Toledo	United States	Huntington Center
August 30, 2010	Cincinnati	United States	Riverbend Music Center
August 31, 2010	Indianapolis	United States	Conseco Fieldhouse

== Rescheduled and canceled shows ==
Rescheduled

- Bridgeport, Connecticut moved from September 13 to July 9
- Pittsburgh, Pennsylvania moved from September 14 to July 21 at First Niagara Pavilion.
- Des Moines, Iowa moved from August 31 to August 26
- Minneapolis, Minnesota moved from August 29 to August 27
- Chicago, Illinois moved from August 30 to August 28
- Toledo, Ohio moved from September 2 to August 29
- Cincinnati, Ohio moved from September 3 to August 30
- Indianapolis, Indiana moved from September 4 to August 31

Canceled

- Omaha, Nebraska on August 26
- Kansas City, Missouri on August 27
- Winnipeg, Manitoba on September 7
- Toronto, Ontario on September 9
- Buffalo, New York on September 10
- Cleveland, Ohio on September 11
- Portland, Maine on September 16

== Response ==
The total gross was reported by Pollstar to be $9.6 million.
