= Aaron Kelly (singer) =

American singer (born 1993)

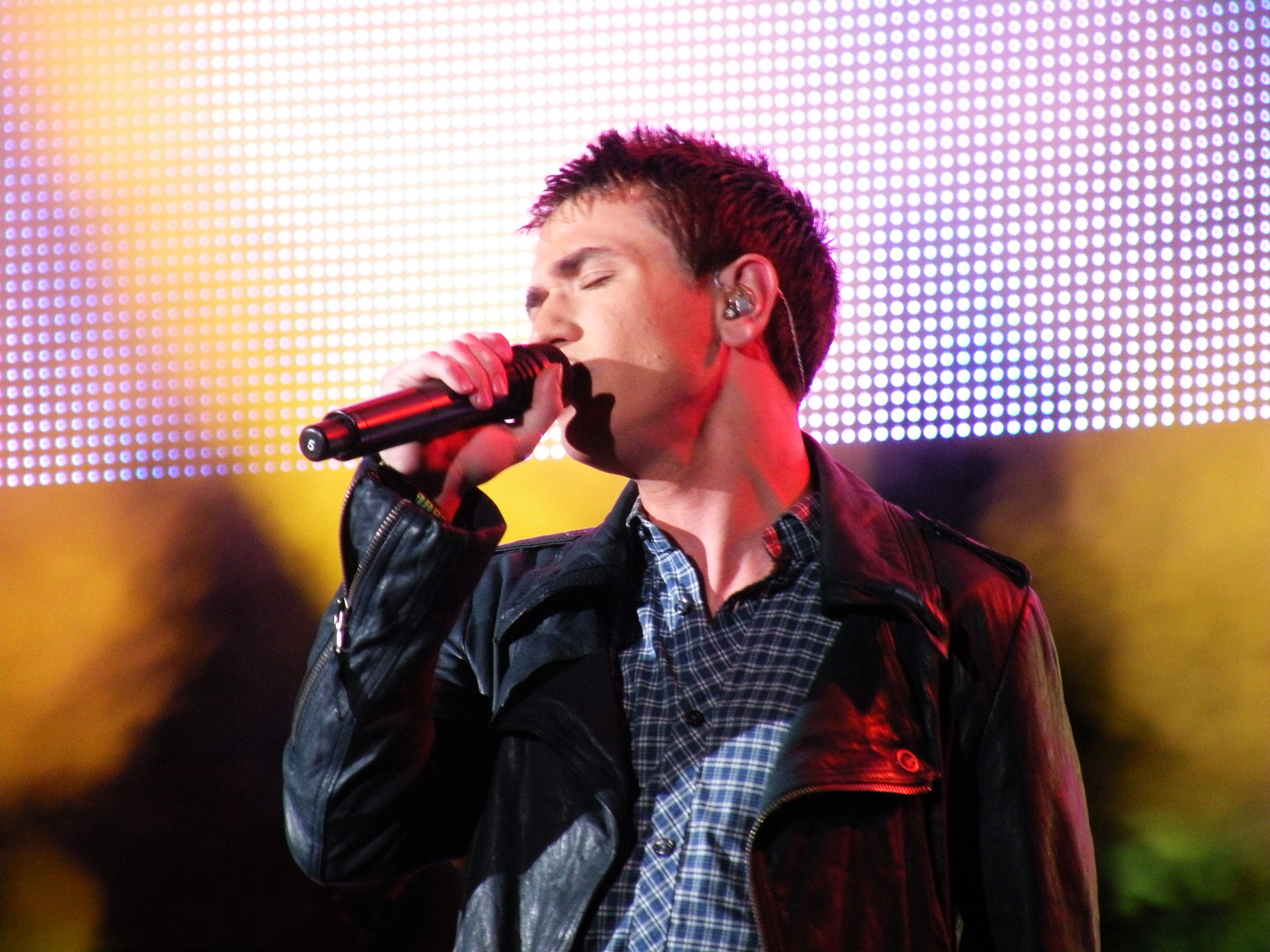
- Aaron Kelly in July 2010.

Background information
- Birth name: Aaron Wayne Kelly
- Born: April 2, 1993 (age 32); Davenport, Florida
- Origin: Sonestown, Pennsylvania, United States
- Genres: Country pop
- Occupation: Singer
- Instrument(s): Vocals, guitar, piano
- Years active: 2004–present
- Website: http://www.AaronKellyofficial.com/

Aaron Wayne Kelly (born April 2, 1993) is an American singer who finished fifth on the ninth season of American Idol. Prior to Idol, Kelly was a finalist on America's Most Talented Kid at age 11.

== Early life ==
Kelly was born in Davenport, Florida. Because of the difficult circumstances between his biological parents, Kelly was legally adopted at the age of 5 by his aunt and uncle, moving to Nashville, Tennessee, and then Sonestown, Pennsylvania. He has sung professionally since the age of 9, performing at festivals and fairs and opening for such acts as Charlie Daniels, Loretta Lynn, Emerson Drive, Bill Anderson and The Marshall Tucker Band. At 11, he was a finalist on PAX-TV's America's Most Talented Kid.

Kelly once had a job selling soda on a beach near his home.

Kelly lists his hobbies as soccer and photography and his musical influences as Keith Urban, Rascal Flatts, Carrie Underwood and Celine Dion.

== American Idol ==
Kelly was a participant in The American Idol Experience at Disney's Hollywood Studios at The Walt Disney World Resort in Orlando. At the end of the day he was the highest vote recipient in the finale show, which entitled him to receive the dream ticket, which got him to the front of the line for the real American Idol auditions in Orlando in June 2009. Kelly is the third contestant from Pennsylvania, and was the youngest contestant to make it through to the Top 12 on American Idol until Thia Megia made the top 12 at 15.

On May 5, 2010, Kelly was eliminated from American Idol after landing in the bottom two with Michael Lynche. Kelly finished fifth place in the competition. On the season finale of American Idol on May 26, 2010, Kelly sang "How Deep Is Your Love" with Siobhan Magnus, who were then both joined by the Bee Gees.

Although he was close to everybody, he was especially good friends with Katie Stevens, Siobhan Magnus, Alex Lambert, Tim Urban, Andrew Garcia, and Lee DeWyze. He was also the youngest ever to reach the top 5.

=== Performances ===
| Week # | Theme | Song choice | Original artist | Order # | Result |
|---|---|---|---|---|---|
| Audition | N/A | "The Climb" | Miley Cyrus | N/A | Advanced |
| Hollywood | Group Round | "Get Ready" | The Temptations | N/A | Advanced |
| Hollywood | Second Solo | "Angel" | Sarah McLachlan | N/A | Advanced |
| Top 24 (12 Men) | Billboard Hot 100 Hits | "Here Comes Goodbye" | Rascal Flatts | 2 | Safe |
| Top 20 (10 Men) | Billboard Hot 100 Hits | "My Girl" | The Temptations | 8 | Safe |
| Top 16 (8 Men) | Billboard Hot 100 Hits | "I'm Already There" | Lonestar | 6 | Safe |
| Top 12 | The Rolling Stones | "Angie" | The Rolling Stones | 11 | Safe |
| Top 11 | Billboard Number 1 Hits | "I Don't Want to Miss a Thing" | Aerosmith | 4 | Safe |
| Top 10 | R&B/Soul | "Ain't No Sunshine" | Bill Withers | 10 | Safe |
| Top 9 | Lennon–McCartney | "The Long and Winding Road" | The Beatles | 1 | Bottom 3^{1} |
| Top 9^{2} | Elvis Presley | "Blue Suede Shoes" | Carl Perkins | 5 | Safe |
| Top 7 | Inspirational | "I Believe I Can Fly" | R. Kelly | 4 | Bottom 3^{1} |
| Top 6 | Shania Twain | "You've Got a Way" | Shania Twain | 5 | Safe |
| Top 5 | Frank Sinatra | "Fly Me to the Moon" | Kaye Ballard | 1 | Eliminated |

== Post-Idol ==
After being eliminated, Kelly appeared on The Ellen DeGeneres Show. On May 10, 2010 he performed on Late Show with David Letterman, Access Hollywood, and May 11, 2010 on The Wendy Williams Show. Kelly says he plans to record a country album and started the American Idols Live! Tour 2010 on July 1, 2010. Kelly sang "Somebody Like You", "Walking in Memphis" and "Fast Cars and Freedom." He also sang in group performances of "The Climb" and "It's My Life".

Kelly was signed to Creative Artists Agency.

== Discography ==
=== Singles ===
| Year | Single |
|---|---|
| 2010 | "I Can't Wait for Christmas" |
| 2012 | "Coincidence" |
| 2021 | "The World Is Round" |
| 2023 | "The Last Thing I Would Say" |
| 2023 | "Can't Make a Meant to Be" |

== Notes ==
- ^1 Kelly was saved first from elimination.
- ^2 Due to the judges using their one save to save Michael Lynche, the Top 9 remained intact for another week.
