= American Idol season 9 =

American Idol
- Season 9
- Hosted by: Ryan Seacrest
- Judges: Simon Cowell; Ellen DeGeneres; Kara DioGuardi; Randy Jackson
- Winner: Lee DeWyze
- Runner-up: Crystal Bowersox
- Finals venue: Nokia Theatre L.A. Live

Release
- Original network: Fox
- Original release: January 12 – May 26, 2010

Season chronology
- ← Previous; Season 8 Next → Season 10

The ninth season of American Idol premiered on Fox on Tuesday, January 12, 2010, and concluded on Wednesday, May 26, 2010. Simon Cowell, Kara DioGuardi, and Randy Jackson returned as judges and were joined by Ellen DeGeneres, who was brought on as a replacement for Paula Abdul after a series of guest judges filled in for the auditions. Idol Gives Back returned on April 21, 2010. The top 24 semifinal format used in the fourth through seventh seasons also returned this season. Cowell, DioGuardi, and DeGeneres all left the show after this season, although only Cowell's departure was announced in advance.

Lee DeWyze, a folk rocker from Mount Prospect, Illinois, won the competition, beating out fellow folk rocker Crystal Bowersox, who was the runner-up. Multiple contestants from this season were signed to record deals including DeWyze, Bowersox, Casey James, Michael Lynche, and Siobhan Magnus. Several contestants who did not even make it to the semifinals eventually had a breakthrough in the music industry, including Tori Kelly, Lauren Daigle, and Tasha Layton.

== Changes from previous seasons ==
Paula Abdul did not return to the judges panel, having announced in the beginning of August 2009 that she was leaving the show due to unresolved contract negotiations. Victoria Beckham, Mary J. Blige, Shania Twain, Katy Perry, Avril Lavigne, Joe Jonas, Neil Patrick Harris, and Kristin Chenoweth were brought on as guest judges during the auditions.

After making the decision to utilize guest judges in Abdul's absence, Fox chairman Peter Rice said that they would find a permanent fourth judge before the season premiere in January 2010. Ellen DeGeneres confirmed on September 9, 2009, that she would be joining the show as the new permanent fourth judge for the rounds held at CBS Television City for Hollywood Week and thereafter.

Additionally, Simon Cowell announced shortly before the ninth season began that it would be his last season on American Idol. Cowell left the show to begin preparations for an American version of his singing competition The X Factor. DeGeneres announced on July 29, 2010, that she would not return to the judges panel because it was not the "right fit" for her. Kara DioGuardi also announced on September 3, 2010, that she would not return as a judge for the tenth season.

== Regional auditions ==
Auditions began on June 14, 2009, less than a month after the previous season's finale. During this stage, a series of guest judges filled in on the judging panel. Auditions were held in the following cities.

American Idol (season 9) – regional auditions
City	Preliminary date	Preliminary venue	Filming date(s)	Filming venue	Guest judge	Golden tickets
Boston, Massachusetts	June 14, 2009	Gillette Stadium	August 13–14, 2009	60 State Street	Victoria Beckham	32
Atlanta, Georgia	June 18, 2009	Georgia Dome	August 16–17, 2009	W Hotel Atlanta Midtown	Mary J. Blige	25
Chicago, Illinois	June 22, 2009	United Center	August 31 – September 1, 2009	Hyatt Regency Chicago	Shania Twain	13
Dallas, Texas	June 26, 2009	Cowboys Stadium	August 24, 2009	W Hotel Dallas Victory	Joe Jonas	31
Dallas, Texas	June 26, 2009	Cowboys Stadium	August 25, 2009	W Hotel Dallas Victory	Neil Patrick Harris	31
Los Angeles, California	June 30, 2009	Rose Bowl Stadium	September 3, 2009	Marina del Rey Marriott	Katy Perry	23
Los Angeles, California	June 30, 2009	Rose Bowl Stadium	September 4, 2009	Marina del Rey Marriott	Avril Lavigne	23
Orlando, Florida	July 9, 2009	Amway Arena	August 28–29, 2009	Rosen Shingle Creek Resort	Kristin Chenoweth	31
Denver, Colorado	July 14, 2009	Invesco Field	August 7–8, 2009	Grand Hyatt	Victoria Beckham	26
Total number of tickets to Hollywood						181

== Hollywood week ==
Held at the Kodak Theatre for the second straight year, the first day of Hollywood Week featured the 181 contestants from the auditions round singing solo with the option of playing an instrument. Ellen DeGeneres made her first appearance as a judge at this time. 96 contestants advanced. The next round required the contestants to split into groups and perform. 71 advanced to the final round of Hollywood requiring a solo performance. 46 made it to the final round, where the judges spoke to the contestants one-by-one to tell them whether they had made the final 24.

== Semifinals ==
The semifinal format used during the fourth through seventh seasons was revived for this season. Starting with twelve women and twelve men, the women and men performed weekly on separate shows, each performing a Billboard Hot 100 song, and on the results show, the bottom two contestants from each group were eliminated from the competition. The semifinals took place over three weeks, meaning that six men and six women were eliminated, leaving the other six men and six women to form the top 12. The women performed on the first night, and the males the next night. However, the men and women switched on March 2 and March 3, because Crystal Bowersox had been hospitalized due to complications from diabetes.

Color key:

This contestant was safe.
This contestant was eliminated.

=== Top 24 ===
Contestants are listed in the order they performed.

Top 24 - Female contestants (February 24)
Contestant	Song	Result
Paige Miles	"All Right Now"	Safe
Ashley Rodriguez	"Happy"	Eliminated
Janell Wheeler	"What About Love"	Eliminated
Lilly Scott	"Fixing a Hole"	Safe
Katelyn Epperly	"Oh! Darling"	Safe
Haeley Vaughn	"I Want to Hold Your Hand"	Safe
Lacey Brown	"Landslide"	Safe
Michelle Delamor	"Fallin'"	Safe
Didi Benami	"The Way I Am"	Safe
Siobhan Magnus	"Wicked Game"	Safe
Crystal Bowersox	"Hand in My Pocket"	Safe
Katie Stevens	"Feeling Good"	Safe

Top 24 - Male contestants (February 25)
Contestant	Song	Result
Todrick Hall	"Since U Been Gone"	Safe
Aaron Kelly	"Here Comes Goodbye"	Safe
Jermaine Sellers	"Get Here"	Safe
Tim Urban	"Apologize"	Safe
Joe Muñoz	"You and I Both"	Eliminated
Tyler Grady	"American Woman"	Eliminated
Lee DeWyze	"Chasing Cars"	Safe
John Park	"God Bless the Child"	Safe
Michael Lynche	"This Love"	Safe
Alex Lambert	"Wonderful World"	Safe
Casey James	"Heaven"	Safe
Andrew Garcia	"Sugar, We're Goin Down"	Safe

Non-competition performance
Performers	Song
Top 24	"American Boy"
Allison Iraheta	"Scars"
Kris Allen	"Let It Be"

=== Top 20 ===
Contestants are listed in the order they performed.

Top 20 - Male contestants (March 2)
Contestant	Song	Result
Michael Lynche	"It's a Man's Man's Man's World"	Safe
John Park	"Gravity"	Eliminated
Casey James	"I Don't Want to Be"	Safe
Alex Lambert	"Everybody Knows"	Safe
Todrick Hall	"What's Love Got to Do with It"	Safe
Jermaine Sellers	"What's Going On"	Eliminated
Andrew Garcia	"You Give Me Something"	Safe
Aaron Kelly	"My Girl"	Safe
Tim Urban	"Come On Get Higher"	Safe
Lee DeWyze	"Lips of an Angel"	Safe

Top 20 - Female contestants (March 3)
Contestant	Song	Result
Crystal Bowersox	"Long As I Can See the Light"	Safe
Haeley Vaughn	"The Climb"	Eliminated
Lacey Brown	"Kiss Me"	Safe
Katie Stevens	"Put Your Records On"	Safe
Didi Benami	"Lean on Me"	Safe
Michelle Delamor	"With Arms Wide Open"	Eliminated
Lilly Scott	"A Change Is Gonna Come"	Safe
Katelyn Epperly	"The Scientist"	Safe
Paige Miles	"Walk Away"	Safe
Siobhan Magnus	"Think"	Safe

Non-competition performance
Performers	Song
Top 20	"I Gotta Feeling"
Danny Gokey	"My Best Days Are Ahead of Me"

=== Top 16 ===
Contestants are listed in the order they performed.

Top 16 - Female contestants (March 9)
Contestant	Song	Result
Katie Stevens	"Breakaway"	Safe
Siobhan Magnus	"The House of the Rising Sun"	Safe
Lacey Brown	"The Story"	Safe
Katelyn Epperly	"I Feel the Earth Move"	Eliminated
Didi Benami	"Rhiannon"	Safe
Paige Miles	"Smile"	Safe
Crystal Bowersox	"Give Me One Reason"	Safe
Lilly Scott	"I Fall to Pieces"	Eliminated

Top 16 - Male contestants (March 10)
Contestant	Song	Result
Lee DeWyze	"Fireflies"	Safe
Alex Lambert	"Trouble"	Eliminated
Tim Urban	"Hallelujah"	Safe
Andrew Garcia	"Genie in a Bottle"	Safe
Casey James	"You'll Think of Me"	Safe
Aaron Kelly	"I'm Already There"	Safe
Todrick Hall	"Somebody to Love"	Eliminated
Michael Lynche	"This Woman's Work"	Safe

Non-competition performance
Performers	Song
Top 16	"Haven't Met You Yet"
Matt Giraud and Scott MacIntyre	"Tell Her About It"

== Top 12 contestants ==
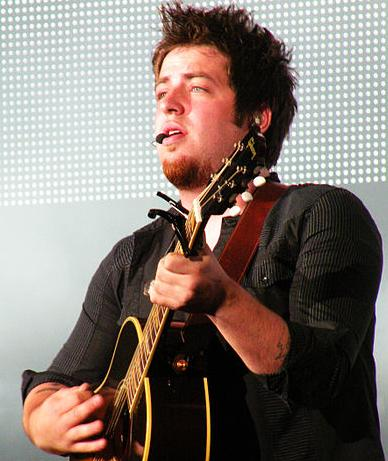
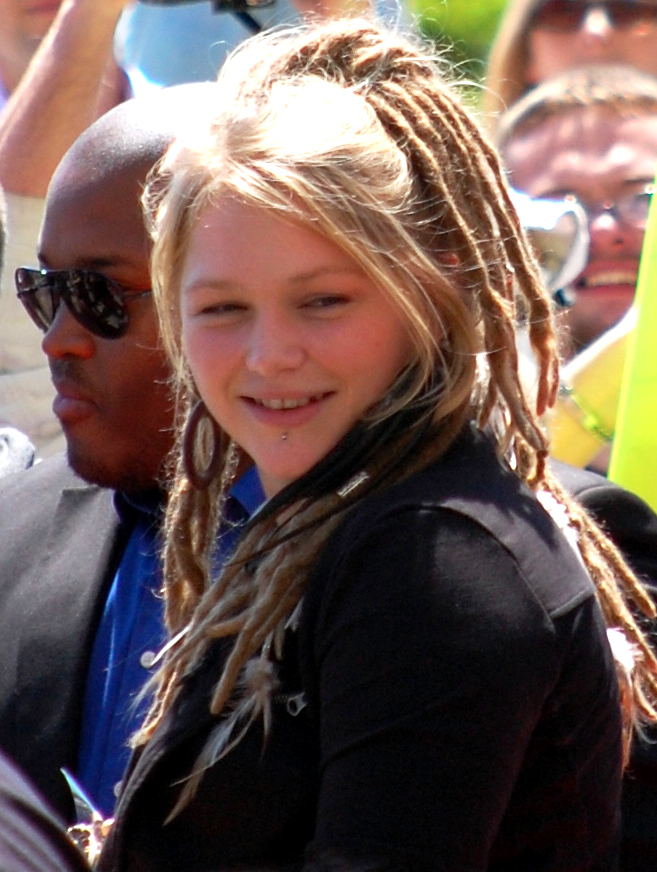
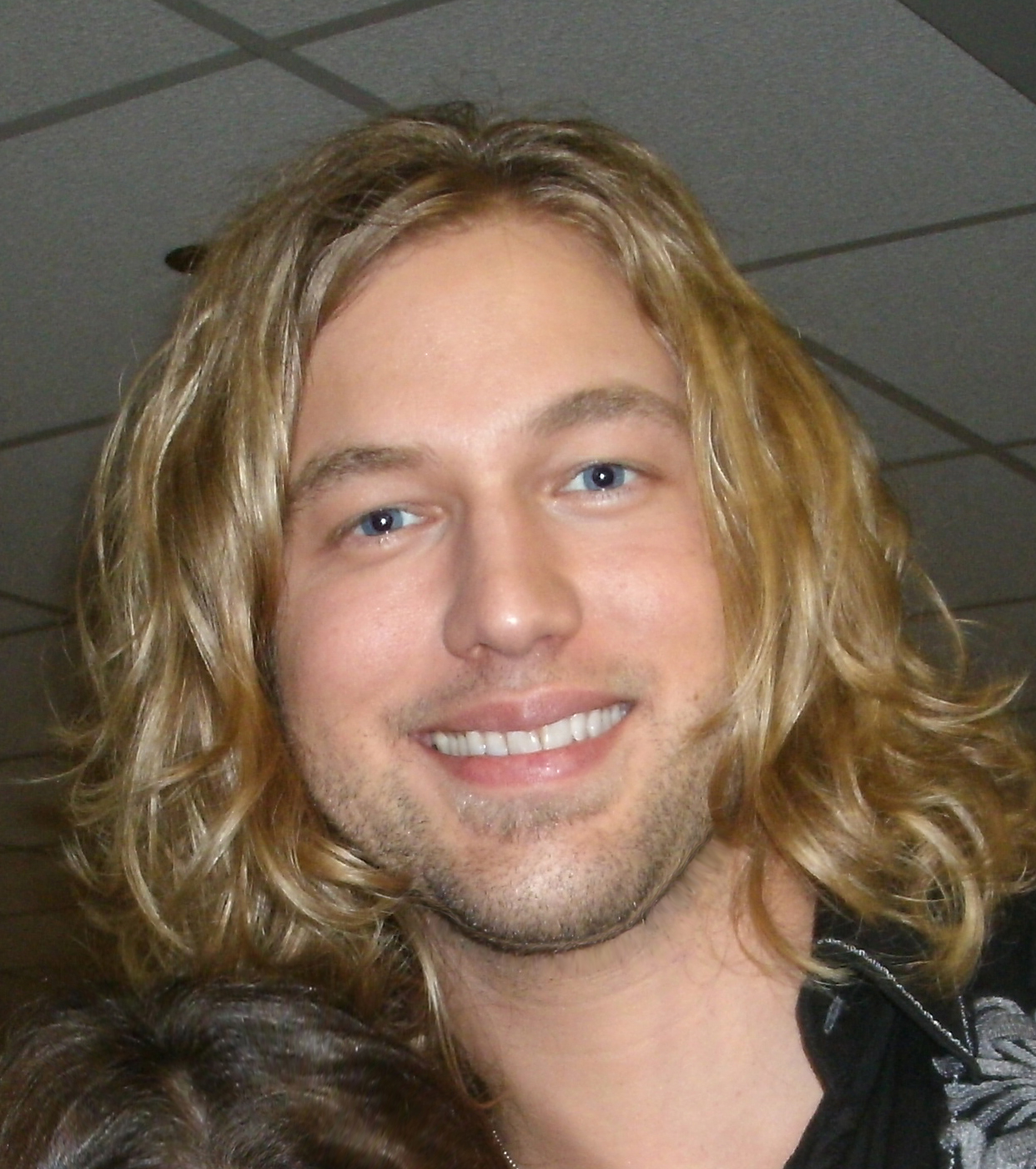
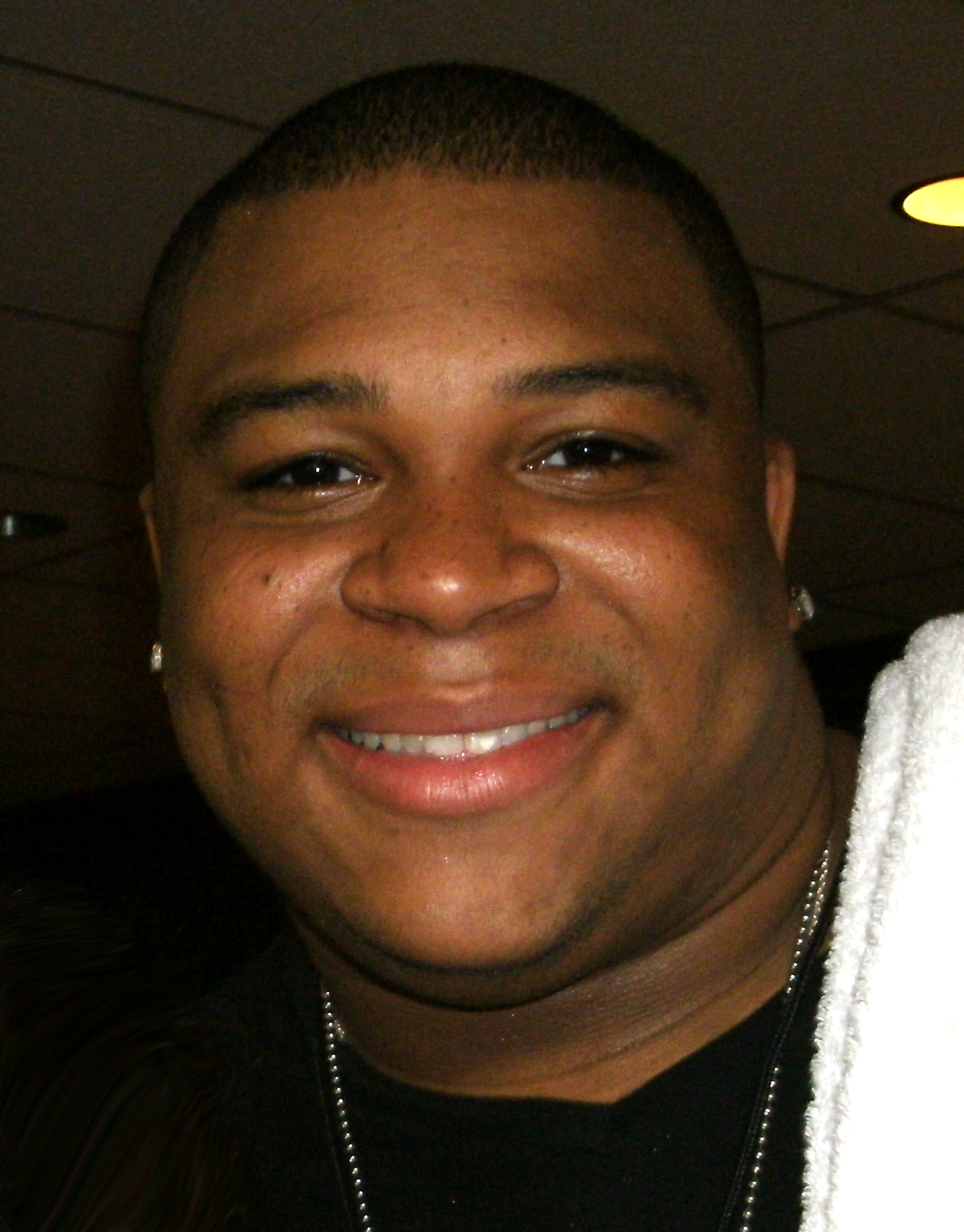
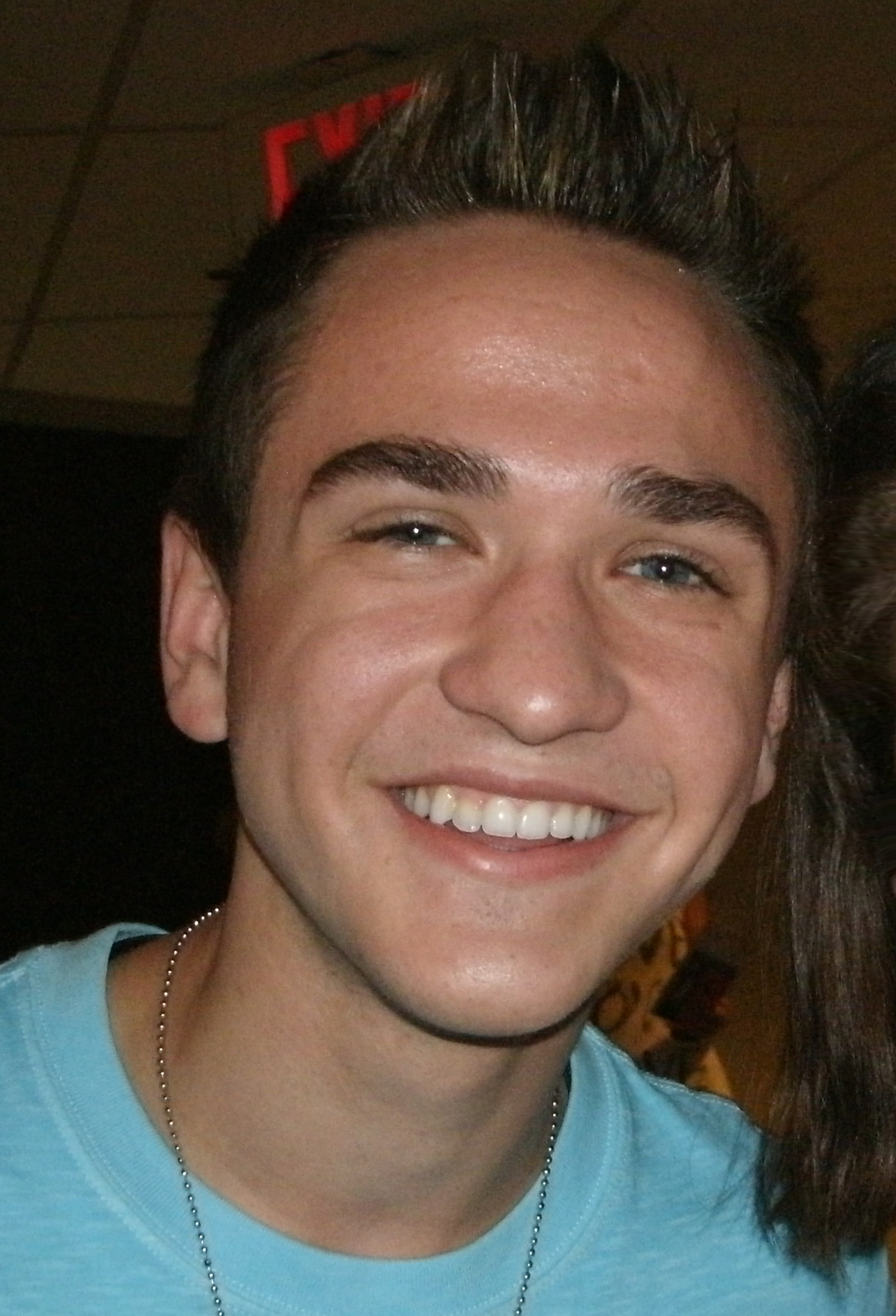
From left to right: Lee DeWyze, Crystal Bowersox, Casey James, Michael Lynche, and Aaron Kelly
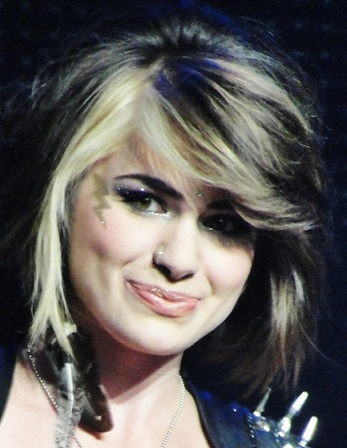
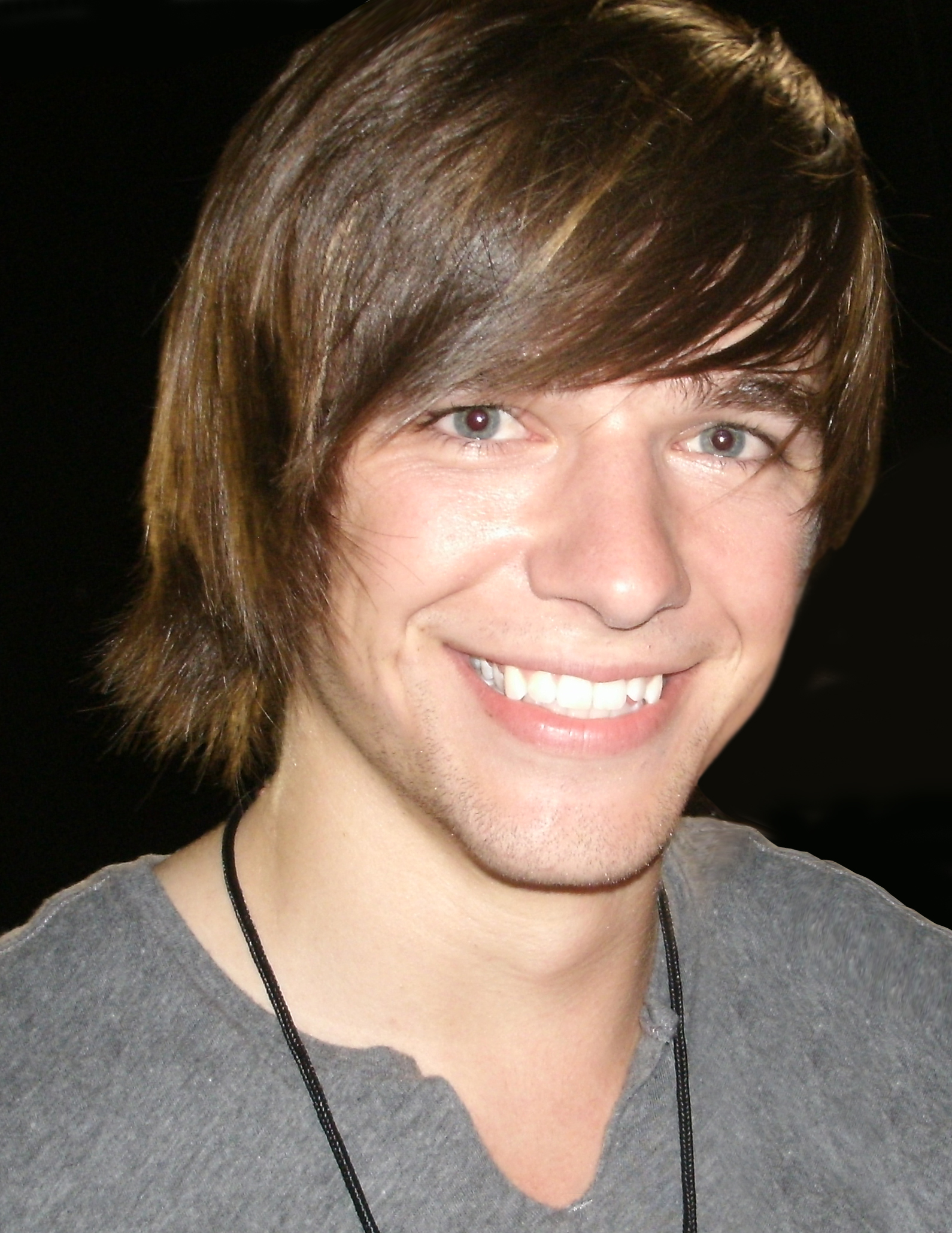
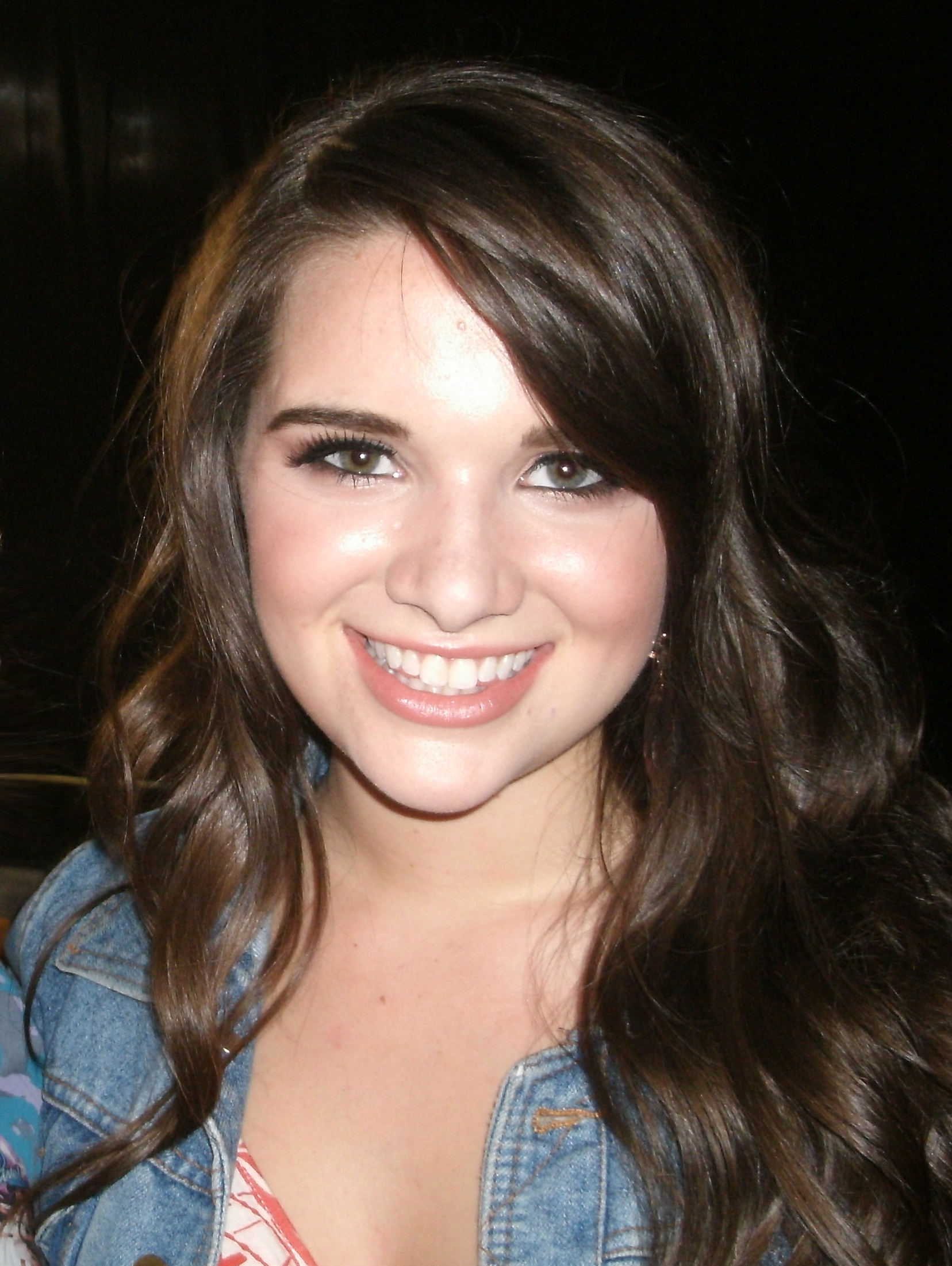
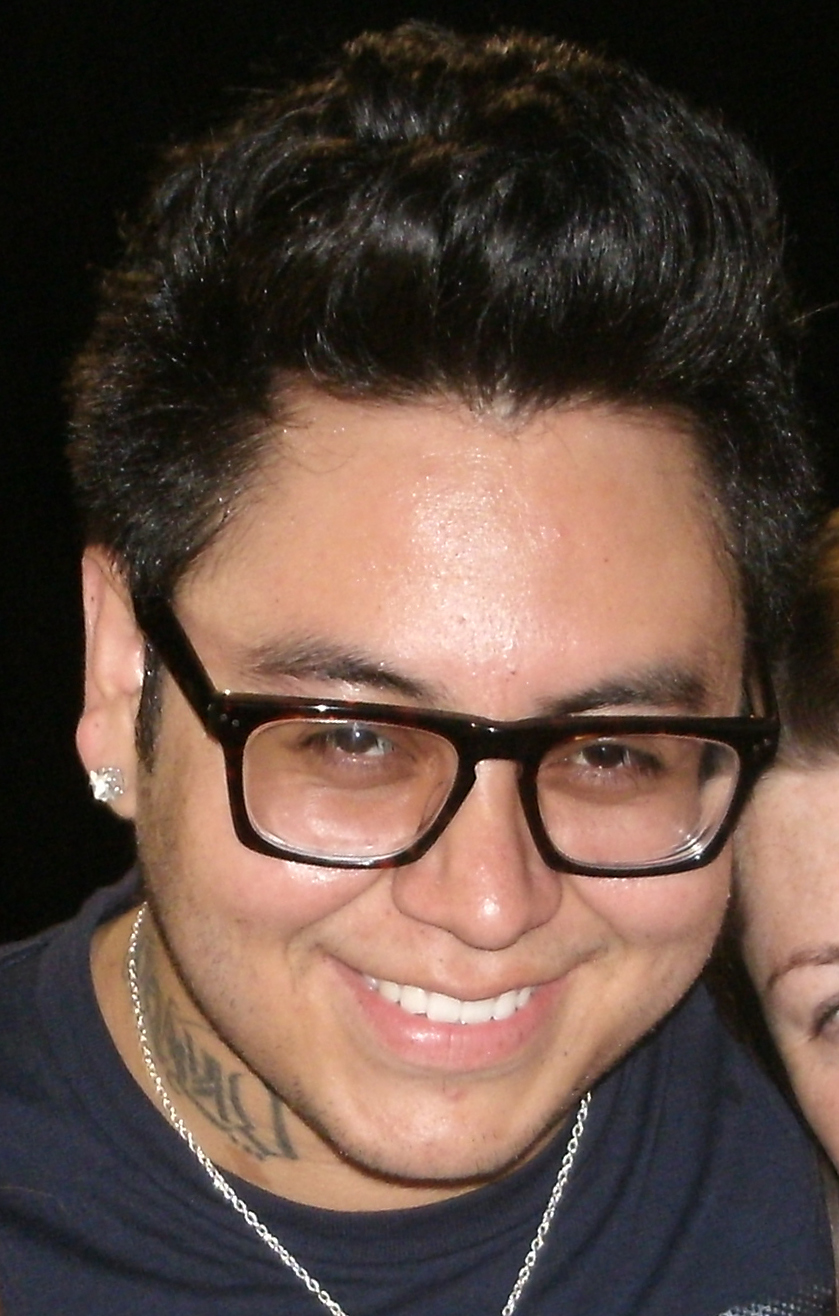
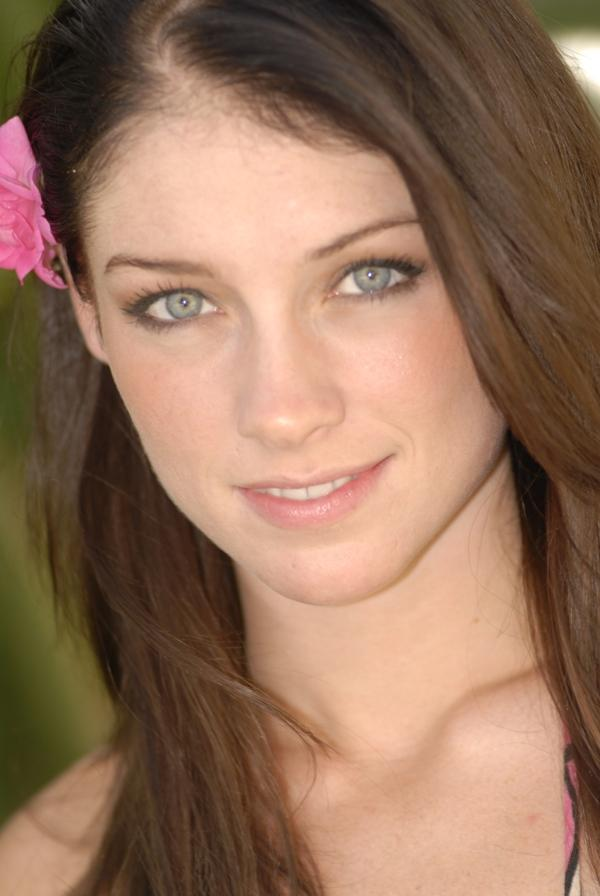
From left to right: Siobhan Magnus, Tim Urban, Katie Stevens, Andrew Garcia, and Didi Benami
- Lee DeWyze (born April 2, 1986, in Mount Prospect, Illinois; 23 years old at the start of the show) was from Mount Prospect, and auditioned in Chicago with Bill Withers' "Ain't No Sunshine." He performed The Fray's "You Found Me" in Hollywood.
- Crystal Bowersox (born August 4, 1985, in Elliston, Ohio; 24 years old at the start of the show) was from Elliston, and auditioned in Chicago with Erma Franklin's "Piece of My Heart." Her Hollywood performance of Aretha Franklin's "(You Make Me Feel Like) A Natural Woman" impressed the judges and fellow contestants alike. She was diagnosed with Type 1 diabetes when she was six, and while on the show, she suffered diabetic complications and was hospitalized, which resulted in the top 20 performance nights for the male and female contestants to switched.
- Casey James (born May 31, 1982, in Princeton, Texas; 27 years old at the start of the show) was from Fort Worth, Texas, and auditioned in Denver with John Mayer's "Slow Dancing in a Burning Room."
- Michael Lynche (born May 31, 1983; 26 years old at the start of the show) was from St. Petersburg, Florida, and auditioned in Orlando with Todd Duncan's "Unchained Melody." His daughter was born during the Hollywood round, and the unfolding drama of his wife's labor was heavily featured while he performed John Mayer's "Waiting on the World to Change."
- Aaron Kelly (born April 2, 1993, in Davenport, Florida; 16 years old at the start of the show) was from Sonestown, Pennsylvania, and auditioned in Orlando with Miley Cyrus's "The Climb." He performed Sarah McLachlan's "Angel" in Hollywood, where he forgot his words.
- Siobhan Magnus (born March 15, 1990, in Barnstable, Massachusetts; 19 years old at the start of the show) was from Cape Cod, Massachusetts, and auditioned in Boston with Queen's "Love of My Life." She performed Stevie Wonder's "Living for the City" in Hollywood.
- Tim Urban (born May 1, 1989, in Tacoma, Washington; 20 years old at the start of the show) was from Duncanville, Texas, and auditioned in Dallas with Matt Nathanson's "Bulletproof Week." He performed David Cook's "Come Back To Me" in Hollywood. He did not initially qualify for the semifinals, but was chosen as a replacement when Chris Golightly was disqualified from the competition.
- Katie Stevens (born December 8, 1992, in Southbury, Connecticut; 17 years old at the start of the show) was from Middlebury, Connecticut, and auditioned in Boston with Glenn Miller's "At Last." She performed Jean DuShon's "For Once in My Life" in Hollywood, where Kara DioGuardi considered her a potential winner.
- Andrew Garcia (born October 8, 1985, in Moreno Valley, California; 24 years old at the start of the show) auditioned in Los Angeles with Maroon 5's "Sunday Morning." He impressed the judges with his performance of Paula Abdul's "Straight Up" in Hollywood.
- Didi Benami (born October 25, 1986, in New York City, New York; 23 years old at the start of the show) was from Knoxville, Tennessee, and auditioned in Los Angeles with The Beatles' "Hey Jude." She performed Katharine McPhee's "Terrified"–penned by Kara DioGuardi–in Hollywood.
- Paige Miles (born September 26, 1985; 24 years old at the start of the show) was from Naples, Florida, and auditioned in Dallas. She performed Stevie Wonder's "Living for the City" in Hollywood.
- Lacey Brown (born August 13, 1985; 24 years old at the start of the show) was from Amarillo, Texas, and auditioned in Orlando with Judy Garland's "Over the Rainbow." She had previously made it to the Hollywood round in the eighth season of American Idol. Ryan Seacrest noted that her performance of "What a Wonderful World" by Louie Armstrong had a major part in her advancing into the top 24.

== Finals ==
The finals ran for eleven weeks with twelve contestants competing. At least one contestant was eliminated every week based on the public's votes, although the judges could veto one elimination through the use of the "judges' save."

Color key:

This contestant was saved by America's vote.
This contestant was in the bottom two or three, but was saved by America's vote.
This contestant was saved from elimination by the judges.
This contestant was eliminated.
This contestant won American Idol.
This contestant was the runner-up.

=== Top 12 – The Rolling Stones ===
Contestants performed one song each from the Rolling Stones discography, and are listed in the order they performed.

Contestant	Rolling Stones song	Result
Michael Lynche	"Miss You"	Safe
Didi Benami	"Play with Fire"	Safe
Casey James	"It's All Over Now"	Safe
Lacey Brown	"Ruby Tuesday"	Eliminated
Andrew Garcia	"Gimme Shelter"	Safe
Katie Stevens	"Wild Horses"	Safe
Tim Urban	"Under My Thumb"	Bottom three
Siobhan Magnus	"Paint It Black"	Safe
Lee DeWyze	"Beast of Burden"	Safe
Paige Miles	"Honky Tonk Women"	Bottom three
Aaron Kelly	"Angie"	Safe
Crystal Bowersox	"You Can't Always Get What You Want"	Safe

Non-competition performance
Performers	Song
David Cook	"Jumpin' Jack Flash"
Orianthi	"According to You"
Kesha, featuring 3OH!3	"Blah Blah Blah"

=== Top 11 – Billboard number ones ===
Miley Cyrus served as a guest mentor this week. Contestants performed one song each from the list of Billboard number one hits, and are listed in the order they performed.

Contestant	Song	Result
Lee DeWyze	"The Letter"	Safe
Paige Miles	"Against All Odds (Take a Look at Me Now)"	Eliminated
Tim Urban	"Crazy Little Thing Called Love"	Bottom three
Aaron Kelly	"I Don't Want to Miss a Thing"	Safe
Crystal Bowersox	"Me and Bobby McGee"	Safe
Michael Lynche	"When a Man Loves a Woman"	Safe
Andrew Garcia	"I Heard It Through the Grapevine"	Safe
Katie Stevens	"Big Girls Don't Cry"	Bottom three
Casey James	"The Power of Love"	Safe
Didi Benami	"You're No Good"	Safe
Siobhan Magnus	"Superstition"	Safe

Non-competition performance
Performers	Song
Top 11	"Wake Me Up Before You Go-Go"
Miley Cyrus	"When I Look at You"
Joe Jonas and Demi Lovato	"Make a Wave"

=== Top 10 – R&B/Soul ===
Usher served as a guest mentor this week. Contestants are listed in the order they performed.

Contestant	R&B/Soul song	Result
Siobhan Magnus	"Through the Fire"	Safe
Casey James	"Hold On, I'm Comin'"	Safe
Michael Lynche	"Ready for Love"	Safe
Didi Benami	"What Becomes of the Brokenhearted"	Eliminated
Tim Urban	"Sweet Love"	Bottom three
Andrew Garcia	"Forever"	Safe
Katie Stevens	"Chain of Fools"	Bottom three
Lee DeWyze	"Treat Her Like a Lady"	Safe
Crystal Bowersox	"Midnight Train to Georgia"	Safe
Aaron Kelly	"Ain't No Sunshine"	Safe

Non-competition performance
Performers	Song
Ruben Studdard	"Don't Make 'Em Like U No More"
Usher and will.i.am	"OMG"
Diddy-Dirty Money	"Hello Good Morning"

=== Top 9 (April 6th) – Lennon–McCartney ===
Contestants chose songs from the Lennon–McCartney discography, and are listed in the order they performed. The judges chose to use their "judges' save" when Michael Lynche was announced as the performer to be eliminated. As a result, no one was eliminated this week.

Contestant	Song	Result
Aaron Kelly	"The Long and Winding Road"	Bottom three
Katie Stevens	"Let It Be"	Safe
Andrew Garcia	"Can't Buy Me Love"	Bottom three
Michael Lynche	"Eleanor Rigby"	Saved by the judges
Crystal Bowersox	"Come Together"	Safe
Tim Urban	"All My Loving"	Safe
Casey James	"Jealous Guy"	Safe
Siobhan Magnus	"Across the Universe"	Safe
Lee DeWyze	"Hey Jude"	Safe

Non-competition performance
Performers	Song
Top 9	Lennon–McCartney medley: "Here, There and Everywhere" "Got to Get You into My Life" "The Fool on the Hill" "All You Need Is Love" "She Loves You" "The End"
Jason Derulo	"In My Head"
David Archuleta	"Imagine"
Rihanna with Nuno Bettencourt	"Rockstar 101"

=== Top 9 (April 13th) – Elvis Presley ===
Adam Lambert served as a guest mentor this week. Contestants performed one song each from the Elvis Presley discography, and are listed in the order they performed. Two contestants were eliminated.

Contestant	Elvis Presley song	Result
Crystal Bowersox	"Saved"	Safe
Andrew Garcia	"Hound Dog"	Eliminated
Tim Urban	"Can't Help Falling in Love"	Safe
Lee DeWyze	"A Little Less Conversation"	Safe
Aaron Kelly	"Blue Suede Shoes"	Safe
Siobhan Magnus	"Suspicious Minds"	Safe
Michael Lynche	"In the Ghetto"	Safe
Katie Stevens	"Baby What You Want Me to Do"	Eliminated
Casey James	"Lawdy Miss Clawdy"	Safe

Non-competition performance
Performers	Song
Top 9	Elvis Presley medley: "(Let Me Be Your) Teddy Bear" "Burning Love" "Return to Sender" "Viva Las Vegas"
Brooke White and Justin Gaston	"If I Can Dream"
Adam Lambert	"Whataya Want from Me"

=== Top 7 – Inspirational music ===
Alicia Keys served as a guest mentor this week. Contestants are listed in the order they performed.

Contestant	Song	Result
Casey James	"Don't Stop"	Bottom three
Lee DeWyze	"The Boxer"	Safe
Tim Urban	"Better Days"	Eliminated
Aaron Kelly	"I Believe I Can Fly"	Bottom three
Siobhan Magnus	"When You Believe"	Safe
Michael Lynche	"Hero"	Safe
Crystal Bowersox	"People Get Ready"	Safe

Non-competition performance
Performers	Song
Top 7	"Keeping the Dream Alive"
Alicia Keys	"Un-Thinkable (I'm Ready)" "Empire State of Mind (Part II) Broken Down"
The Black Eyed Peas	"Rock That Body"
Carrie Underwood	"Change"
Elton John	"Your Song"
Mary J. Blige	"Stairway to Heaven"

=== Top 6 – Shania Twain ===
Shania Twain served as a guest mentor this week. Contestants performed one song each from her discography, and are listed in the order they performed.

Contestant	Shania Twain song	Result
Lee DeWyze	"You're Still the One"	Safe
Michael Lynche	"It Only Hurts When I'm Breathing"	Bottom three
Casey James	"Don't!"	Bottom three
Crystal Bowersox	"No One Needs to Know"	Safe
Aaron Kelly	"You've Got a Way"	Safe
Siobhan Magnus	"Any Man of Mine"	Eliminated

Non-competition performance
Performers	Song
Rascal Flatts	"Unstoppable"
Sons of Sylvia	"Love Left to Lose"
Lady Antebellum	"Need You Now"
Shakira and Rascal Flatts	"Gypsy"

=== Top 5 – Frank Sinatra ===
Harry Connick, Jr. served as a guest mentor this week. Contestants performed one song each from the Frank Sinatra discography, and are listed in the order they performed.

Contestant	Frank Sinatra song	Result
Aaron Kelly	"Fly Me to the Moon"	Eliminated
Casey James	"Blue Skies"	Safe
Crystal Bowersox	"Summer Wind"	Safe
Michael Lynche	"The Way You Look Tonight"	Bottom two
Lee DeWyze	"That's Life"	Safe

Non-competition performance
Performers	Song
Top 5	Frank Sinatra medley: "The Lady Is a Tramp" "It Was a Very Good Year" "I've Got the World on a String" "Night and Day"
Top 5	Harry Connick, Jr. medley: "We Are in Love" "Come by Me" "Hear Me in the Harmony"
Lady Gaga	"Bad Romance" "Alejandro"
Harry Connick, Jr.	"And I Love Her"

=== Top 4 – Movie soundtracks ===
Jamie Foxx served as a guest mentor this week. Each contestant performed two songs: one solo and one duet with a fellow contestant. Contestants are listed in the order they performed.

Contestant	Order	Song	Film	Result
Lee DeWyze	1	"Kiss from a Rose"	Batman Forever	Safe
Michael Lynche	2	"Will You Be There"	Free Willy	Eliminated
Casey James	4	"Mrs. Robinson"	The Graduate	Safe
Crystal Bowersox	5	"I'm Alright"	Caddyshack	Safe
Crystal Bowersox & Lee DeWyze	3	"Falling Slowly"	Once	
Casey James & Michael Lynche	6	"Have You Ever Really Loved a Woman?"	Don Juan DeMarco	

Non-competition performance
Performers	Song
Fantasia	"Bittersweet"
Daughtry	"September"
Bon Jovi	"Superman Tonight"

=== Top 3 — Contestant's Choice/Judges' Choice ===
Each contestant performed two songs: one chosen by the judges and one chosen by the contestant. Contestants are listed in the order they performed.

Contestant	Order	Song	Result
Casey James	1	"OK, It's Alright with Me"	Eliminated
Casey James	4	"Daughters" (Note: Song chosen by Randy Jackson and Kara DioGuardi.)	Eliminated
Crystal Bowersox	2	"Come to My Window"	Safe
Crystal Bowersox	5	"Maybe I'm Amazed" (Note: Song chosen by Ellen DeGeneres.)	Safe
Lee DeWyze	3	"Simple Man"	Safe
Lee DeWyze	6	"Hallelujah" (Note: Song chosen by Simon Cowell.)	Safe

Non-competition performance
Performers	Song
Travis Garland	"Believe"
Justin Bieber	"U Smile" "Baby"

=== Top 2 – Finale ===
Each contestant performed three songs, one of which was chosen by producer Simon Fuller, and are listed in the order they performed.

Contestant	Order	Song	Result
Lee DeWyze	1	"The Boxer"	Winner
Lee DeWyze	3	"Everybody Hurts" (Note: Song chosen by Simon Fuller.)	Winner
Lee DeWyze	5	"Beautiful Day"	Winner
Crystal Bowersox	2	"Me and Bobby McGee"	Runner-up
Crystal Bowersox	4	"Black Velvet"	Runner-up
Crystal Bowersox	6	"Up to the Mountain (MLK Song)"	Runner-up

Non-competition performances
Performers	Song
Will Young	"Leave Right Now"
Top 12 with Alice Cooper	"School's Out"
Kris Allen	"The Truth"
Siobhan Magnus and Aaron Kelly with Barry Gibb and Robin Gibb	"How Deep Is Your Love"
Michael Lynche with Michael McDonald	"Takin' It to the Streets"
Dane Cook	"Simon Said"
Crystal Bowersox, Siobhan Magnus, Katie Stevens Didi Benami, Paige Miles and Lacey Brown with Christina Aguilera	"Beautiful" "Fighter" "You Lost Me"
Lee DeWyze, Casey James, Michael Lynche Aaron Kelly, Tim Urban and Andrew Garcia with Daryl Hall & John Oates	"I Can't Go for That (No Can Do)" "Maneater" "You Make My Dreams"
Crystal Bowersox with Alanis Morissette	"Ironic" "You Oughta Know"
Carrie Underwood	"Undo It"
Casey James with Bret Michaels	"Every Rose Has Its Thorn"
Lee DeWyze with Chicago	"Does Anybody Really Know What Time It Is?" "If You Leave Me Now" "25 or 6 to 4"
Larry Platt and William Hung	"Pants on the Ground"
Kelly Clarkson, Ruben Studdard, Fantasia Barrino, Carrie Underwood, Taylor Hicks, Jordin Sparks and Kris Allen	"Together We Are One"
Top 12 with Janet Jackson	"Again" "Nothing" "Nasty"
Lee DeWyze and Crystal Bowersox with Joe Cocker	"With a Little Help from My Friends"
Lee DeWyze	"Beautiful Day"

== Elimination chart ==
Color key:

Winner
Runner-up
Saved by the public
Saved by the judges
Bottom two or three
Eliminated

American Idol (season 9) - Eliminations
Contestant	Pl.	Semifinals			Top 12	Top 11	Top 10	Top 9 (Note: Because the judges used their one "judges' save" to save Michael Lynche, the top 9 remained intact for another week.)		Top 7	Top 6	Top 5	Top 4	Top 3	Finale
Contestant	Pl.	2/25	3/4	3/11	3/18	3/25	4/1	4/8	4/15	4/22	4/29	5/5	5/12	5/19	5/26
Lee DeWyze	1	Safe	Safe	Safe	Safe	Safe	Safe	Safe	Safe	Safe	Safe	Safe	Safe	Safe	Winner
Crystal Bowersox	2	Safe	Safe	Safe	Safe	Safe	Safe	Safe	Safe	Safe	Safe	Safe	Safe	Safe	Runner-up
Casey James	3	Safe	Safe	Safe	Safe	Safe	Safe	Safe	Safe	Bottom three	Bottom three	Safe	Safe	Eliminated	
Michael Lynche	4	Safe	Safe	Safe	Safe	Safe	Safe	Saved	Safe	Safe	Bottom three	Bottom two	Eliminated		
Aaron Kelly	5	Safe	Safe	Safe	Safe	Safe	Safe	Bottom three	Safe	Bottom three	Safe	Eliminated			
Siobhan Magnus	6	Safe	Safe	Safe	Safe	Safe	Safe	Safe	Safe	Safe	Eliminated				
Tim Urban	7	Safe	Safe	Safe	Bottom three	Bottom three	Bottom three	Safe	Safe	Eliminated					
Andrew Garcia	8	Safe	Safe	Safe	Safe	Safe	Safe	Bottom three	Eliminated						
Katie Stevens	8	Safe	Safe	Safe	Safe	Bottom three	Bottom three	Safe	Eliminated						
Didi Benami	10	Safe	Safe	Safe	Safe	Safe	Eliminated								
Paige Miles	11	Safe	Safe	Safe	Bottom three	Eliminated									
Lacey Brown	12	Safe	Safe	Safe	Eliminated										
Katelyn Epperly		Safe	Safe	Eliminated											
Todrick Hall		Safe	Safe	Eliminated											
Alex Lambert		Safe	Safe	Eliminated											
Lilly Scott		Safe	Safe	Eliminated											
Michelle Delamor		Safe	Eliminated												
John Park		Safe	Eliminated												
Jermaine Sellers		Safe	Eliminated												
Haeley Vaughn		Safe	Eliminated												
Tyler Grady		Eliminated													
Ashley Rodriguez		Eliminated													
Joe Muñoz		Eliminated													
Janell Wheeler		Eliminated													

== Controversies ==
Chris Golightly was originally selected as a semi-finalist. According to reports, Golightly was disqualified on February 17, 2010, after already being told he was in the top 24, over an old contract. The contract had expired by the time the top 24 began to tape, but they disqualified him because he was under contract at the time of the tryouts, in violation of Idol rules. He was later replaced by Tim Urban at the last minute of the last part of Hollywood Week.

Ryan Seacrest was criticized by TheWrap and MSNBC Entertainment for "critiquing the judges’ comments" and becoming more aggressive. Ratings for the season dropped significantly compared to the previous two seasons, leading to speculation that the show might be coming to a close. It was speculated that reasons for the decline may have included the pending departure of Simon Cowell and the more unpredictable behavior of Ryan Seacrest.

== U.S. Nielsen ratings ==
This season of American Idol was the top show for the 2009–10 season of broadcast primetime shows. Its Tuesday and Wednesday episodes occupied the top two spots of the season. Viewership for the Tuesday episodes averaged 22.974 million, while the Wednesday episodes averaged 21.951 million viewers.

Episode list

Show	Episode	Air date	Rating	Share	rating/Share 18–49	Viewers (in millions)
1	"Boston Auditions"	January 12, 2010	16.4	24	11.8/29	29.936
2	"Atlanta Auditions"	January 13, 2010	14.9	23	10.1/27	26.393
3	"Chicago Auditions"	January 19, 2010	14.3	22	10.1/27	26.384
4	"Orlando Auditions"	January 20, 2010	14.6	23	9.9/27	26.854
5	"Los Angeles Auditions"	January 26, 2010	13.5	21	9.0/24	24.452
6	"Dallas Auditions"	January 27, 2010	13.4	22	9.5/24	25.710
7	"Denver Auditions"	February 2, 2010	13.4	20	9.0/23	24.705
8	"Best of the Rest"	February 3, 2010	11.9	19	7.8/21	20.999
9	"Hollywood Round, Part 1"	February 9, 2010	15.1	22	10.1/26	27.892
10	"Hollywood Round, Part 2"	February 10, 2010	13.6	21	9.5/23	25.172
11	"Hollywood Round, Part 3"	February 16, 2010	13.1	20	9.2/22	23.922
12	"Hollywood Round, Part 4"	February 17, 2010	10.6	16	7.0/17	18.629
13	"Top 12 Female Semifinalists Perform"	February 23, 2010	13.4	20	9.0/22	24.213
14	"Top 12 Male Semifinalists Perform"	February 24, 2010	12.9	20	8.7/22	22.959
15	"First Results Show"	February 25, 2010	10.3	16	6.5/17	18.033
16	"Top 10 Male Semifinalists Perform"	March 2, 2010	13.1	20	8.6/22	23.526
17	"Top 10 Female Semifinalists Perform"	March 3, 2010	13.4	21	8.5	23.560
18	"Second Results Show"	March 4, 2010	11.2	18	6.5	19.424
19	"Top 8 Female Semifinalists Perform"	March 9, 2010	12.8	18	8.2	22.752
20	"Top 8 Male Semifinalists Perform"	March 10, 2010	11.9	18	7.5/20	20.701
21	"Third Results Show/Top 12 Revealed"	March 11, 2010	11.2	18	6.3	19.339
22	"Top 12 Finalists Perform"	March 16, 2010	13.0	21	8.1/23	22.913
23	"Top 12 Results Show"	March 17, 2010	11.8	20	6.8/20	20.510
24	"Top 11 Finalists Perform"	March 23, 2010	13.5	21	8.4/23	24.211
25	"Top 11 Results Show"	March 24, 2010	12.2	20	7.2/20	21.437
26	"Top 10 Finalists Perform"	March 30, 2010	12.4	20	7.7/21	21.845
27	"Top 10 Results Show"	March 31, 2010	11.7	19	6.7/19	20.492
28	"Top 9 Finalists Perform"	April 6, 2010	11.9	19	7.3/20	20.836
29	"Top 9 Results Show"	April 7, 2010	11.6	18	6.7/18	20.168
30	"Top 9 Finalists Perform Again"	April 13, 2010	11.8	19	7.3/21	20.639
31	"Double Elimination Top 9 Results Show"	April 14, 2010	12.1	20	6.8/19	21.018
32	"Top 7 Finalists Perform"	April 20, 2010	11.0	18	6.9/20	19.669
33	"Top 7 Results Show/Idol Gives Back"	April 21, 2010	10.6	18	5.9/17	18.824
34	"Top 6 Finalists Perform"	April 27, 2010	11.0	17	6.9/20	19.417
35	"Top 6 Results Show"	April 28, 2010	11.5	18	6.7/18	20.057
36	"Top 5 Finalists Perform"	May 4, 2010	10.1	16	6.2/18	17.498
37	"Top 5 Results Show"	May 5, 2010	11.3	18	6.5/18	19.580
38	"Top 4 Finalists Perform"	May 11, 2010	10.7	17	6.8/18	19.167
39	"Top 4 Results Show"	May 12, 2010	11.2	18	6.6/17	19.569
40	"Top 3 Finalists Perform"	May 18, 2010	10.5	17	6.7/18	18.684
41	"Top 3 Results Show"	May 19, 2010	11.1	18	6.1/16	19.003
42	"Top 2 Finalists Perform"	May 25, 2010	11.2	18	6.7/19	20.072
43	"Winner Revealed"	May 26, 2010	13.5	23	8.2/24	24.215

== See also ==
- American Idols LIVE! Tour 2010
