= Paige Miles =

American singer

- Born: Paige Sade Miles; September 24, 1985 (age 40)
- Origin: Naples, Florida, United States
- Genres: Pop, R&B
- Occupation: Singer
- Instrument: Vocals
- Years active: 2010–present
- Website: www.thepaigemiles.com

Paige Sade Miles (born September 24, 1985) is an American singer who was the eleventh place finalist on the ninth season of American Idol.

== Biography ==
=== Early life ===
Born on September 24, 1985, Miles is the daughter of a single mother Emma Miles from Naples, Florida. Her father died when she was four years old after he was paralysed from the neck down following a car accident. Miles began singing at church. She fell in love with music when she saw "Captain E.O" at Epcot with her mother and brother in Orlando at the age of four. Miles grew up in Naples, Florida, and joined her first cheerleading team at the age of five, and her first part in a school musical was at the age of seven. Miles continued competitive cheerleading until the age of 18. Also a trained gymnast, Miles played soccer and volleyball at her school and loved performing arts.

Miles has been active in dog rescue for several years and helps with Noah's Ark in Houston, Texas, and Pup Squad in Cypress, Texas. An alumna of the Community School of Naples, Miles played the role of Geneva Lee Browne at the Sugden Theater in Naples, Florida, in The 1940's Radio Hour.

== American Idol ==
Miles first appeared during the Hollywood group rounds of the competition with top 40 contestants Thaddeus Johnson and Jessica Cunningham, along with Liz Rooney who left in the following round of the competition

Miles was the first contestant to perform on the semi-finals of the show, her first major appearance on the show. She performed "All Right Now" by the band Free, causing Simon Cowell to label her as the contestant "with the most potential". He also told her that of all the girls, she had the best voice. On the second week, she sang Walk Away by Kelly Clarkson, which was generally accepted by the panel. Her third performance was the song Smile by Nat King Cole. Her performance was criticized by the judges for being too "sad" and she was almost eliminated. Despite her limited airtime, Miles made it to the Top 12.

Miles performed the song "Honky Tonk Women" for The Rolling Stones week – her performance was good despite being ill with laryngitis. The next day, Miles was sent to the bottom three, along with her friend and roommate Lacey Brown and Tim Urban. Simon Cowell commented "one of them was worth saving" but did not reveal who it was. She and Urban were later proclaimed as "safe" leaving her friend Brown behind. Brown was not saved by the judges and was eliminated. Miles performed "Against All Odds (Take a Look at Me Now)" by Phil Collins for Billboard No. 1 Hits week. Her performance was panned by the judges largely due to Miles still suffering from laryngitis. She was eliminated from the show on March 24, 2010.

=== Performances/results ===
Week #	Theme	Song choice	Original artist	Order #	Result
Audition	Auditioner's Choice	Unaired		N/A	Advanced
Hollywood	First Solo	Unaired		N/A	Advanced
Hollywood	Group Performance	"Bad Romance"	Lady Gaga	N/A	Advanced
Hollywood	Second Solo	"Living for the City"	Stevie Wonder	N/A	Advanced
Top 24 (12 Women)	Billboard Hot 100 Hits	"All Right Now"	Free	1	Safe
Top 20 (10 Women)	Billboard Hot 100 Hits	"Walk Away"	Kelly Clarkson	9	Safe
Top 16 (8 Women)	Billboard Hot 100 Hits	"Smile"	Nat King Cole	6	Safe
Top 12	The Rolling Stones	"Honky Tonk Women"	The Rolling Stones	10	Bottom 3^{1}
Top 11	Billboard No. 1 Hits	"Against All Odds (Take a Look at Me Now)"	Phil Collins	2	Eliminated

- ^Note 1: When Ryan Seacrest announced the results for this particular night, Miles was among the Bottom 3 but declared safe second, as Lacey Brown was eliminated.

=== Post-Idol career ===
After Miles was eliminated she went on shows such as Late Show with David Letterman, The Ellen DeGeneres Show, Wendy Williams and other FOX affiliated shows. Miles came back to Idol to perform for "Idol Gives Back" and the season finale.

Miles has moved to Los Angeles to pursue her singing career and is writing and recording songs for her future EP release, StarDust, working with noted producers and writers such Mack Mckinney, Davy Deluge, Atozzio and Mandy Ventrice.

Miles was a panel member, and also performed some of her original material, at the 1st Annual Reality Rocks Expo in April 2011. She also stars in the musical Beehive.

In April 2011 Miles was driving when her car caught fire. She had to escape through the window as the doors were locked after the electric system shut down.

On June 26, 2011, Miles released her first original single on iTunes titled, "Definition of Me".
