= Katie Stevens =

American actress and singer

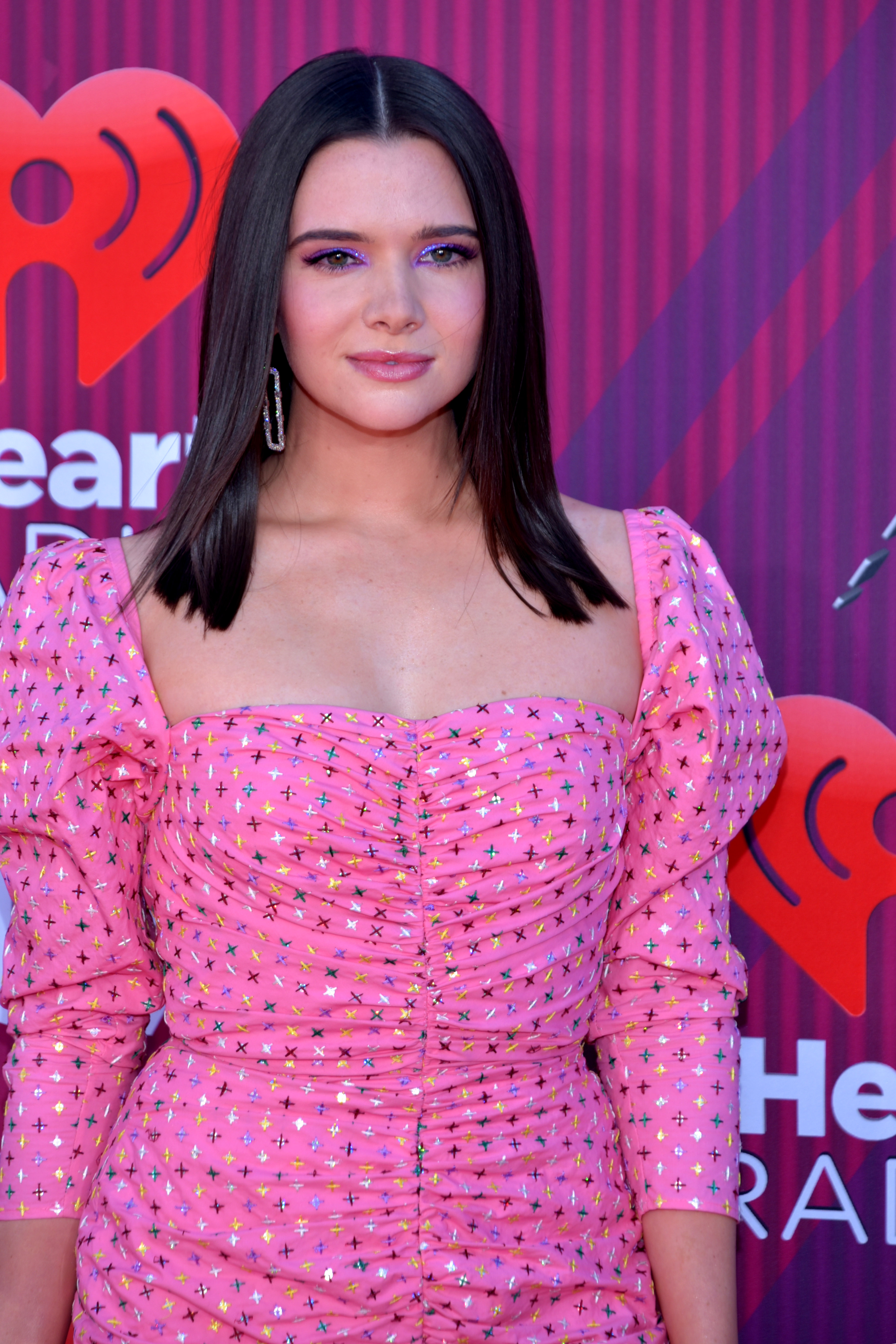
- Stevens at the 2019 iHeartRadio Music Awards
- Occupations: Singer; actress
- Years active: 2010–present
- Spouse: Paul DiGiovanni (m. 2019)
- Children: 2
- Musical career
- Genres: Pop; country
- Instrument: Vocals

Katie Stevens is an American actress and singer, known for finishing in eighth place on the ninth season of American Idol and starring as Karma Ashcroft in Faking It and Jane Sloan in The Bold Type.

== Early life ==
Stevens grew up in Middlebury, Connecticut, the daughter of Mark and Clara (née Francisco) Stevens. She graduated from Pomperaug High School in Southbury in June 2010. She was named the 2009 Westbury Outstanding Teen at the Greater Watertown Scholarship Pageant.

Stevens is of Portuguese descent on her mother's side and speaks Portuguese. She was instrumental in the creation of the Evan Gagnon Memorial Scholarship Fund, which gives college scholarships to the seniors of Pomperaug High School (Evan Gagnon, who died in January 2009 at the age of two, was the son of Stevens' Spanish teacher.) She was a member of Pomperaug High School's varsity swim team for four years. Stevens first performed for an audience at the age of five years, when she sang the national anthem at a party for a politician in her hometown.

When she was seven years old, she sang "From This Moment On" at an aunt's wedding. She has long been active in her local theater community. She played Dorothy in both BSS Children's Theater and Main Street Theater's production of The Wizard of Oz. At Main Street Theater Stevens also played the role of Sharpay in High School Musical and "The Cat" in Honk. She played Nellie Forbush in Pomperaug High School's South Pacific alongside Gary Dwyer as Emile DeBeque. She performed at Carnegie Hall at the age of 13.

== Career ==
=== 2009–2010: American Idol ===
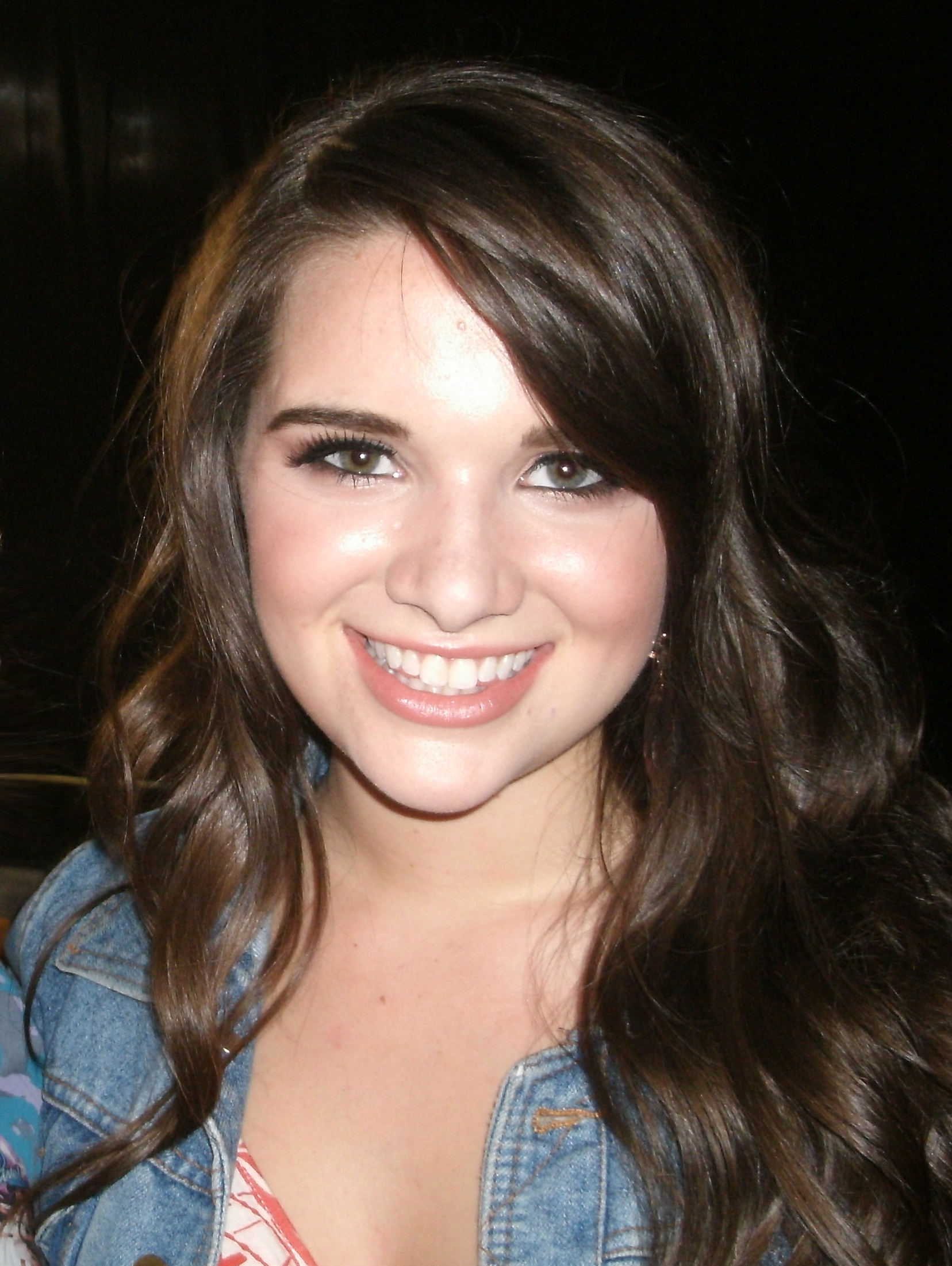
Stevens in July 2010

On August 13, 2009, she auditioned for American Idol in Boston, Massachusetts and sang "At Last", where all four judges (including guest judge Victoria Beckham) advanced her to Hollywood. At the Boston audition, judge Kara DioGuardi called her one of the most talented 16-year-olds she had ever seen. In Hollywood, DioGuardi made the prediction, "You could be the potential winner." On March 24, 2010, Stevens landed in the bottom 3 during elimination night, along with Paige Miles and Tim Urban. She was proclaimed safe, giving her a spot on the American Idol summer tour.

Most of the critiques the judges gave her had been with regard to her pitch, age, and song choice. In her performance of "Chain of Fools", DioGuardi told her she had found where she belonged: R&B-pop, but she needed to work on being younger. She landed in the bottom three the following night but was declared safe, putting her into the Top 9.

In her Top 9 performance of "Let It Be", all of the judges thought it was a huge improvement. Ellen stated that she wouldn't be in the bottom 3 after that performance. Simon said that she had done what she was told by being Country, while Kara and Randy disagreed, opining that she has more of an R&B sensibility. Nonetheless, her performance secured her a position in the Top 8. However, the Top 9 remained intact for another week due to the judges' save of Michael Lynche. She was eliminated from American Idol the following week on April 14, along with Andrew Garcia. Her elimination came second on the double elimination night. From July 1 to August 31, 2010, Stevens toured with the American Idols LIVE! Tour 2010. On tour, she sang "Here We Go Again" and "Fighter".

==== Performances ====
Week #	Theme	Song choice	Original artist	Order #	Result
Audition	Auditioner's Choice	"At Last"	Glenn Miller and his Orchestra	N/A	Advanced
Hollywood	First Solo Performance	"For Once in My Life"	Stevie Wonder	N/A	Advanced
Hollywood	Group Performance	"No One"	Alicia Keys	N/A	Advanced
Hollywood	Second Solo	"Chasing Pavements"	Adele	N/A	Advanced
Top 24 (12 women)	Billboard Hot 100 Hits	"Feeling Good"	Cy Grant	12	Safe
Top 20 (10 women)	Billboard Hot 100 Hits	"Put Your Records On"	Corinne Bailey Rae	4	Safe
Top 16 (8 women)	Billboard Hot 100 Hits	"Breakaway"	Kelly Clarkson	1	Safe
Top 12	The Rolling Stones	"Wild Horses"	The Rolling Stones	6	Safe
Top 11	Billboard #1 Hits	"Big Girls Don't Cry"	Fergie	8	Bottom 3^{1}
Top 10	R&B/Soul	"Chain of Fools"	Aretha Franklin	7	Bottom 3^{1}
Top 9	Lennon–McCartney	"Let It Be"	The Beatles	2	Safe
Top 9^{2}	Elvis Presley	"Baby What You Want Me to Do"	Jimmy Reed	8	Eliminated^{3}

- ^Note 1 Stevens was saved first from elimination.
- ^Note 2 Due to the judges using their one save to save Michael Lynche, the Top 9 remained intact for another week.
- ^Note 3 Because of the judges' save on April 7, Stevens was eliminated along with Andrew Garcia on April 14.

=== 2010–present: Faking It and The Bold Type ===
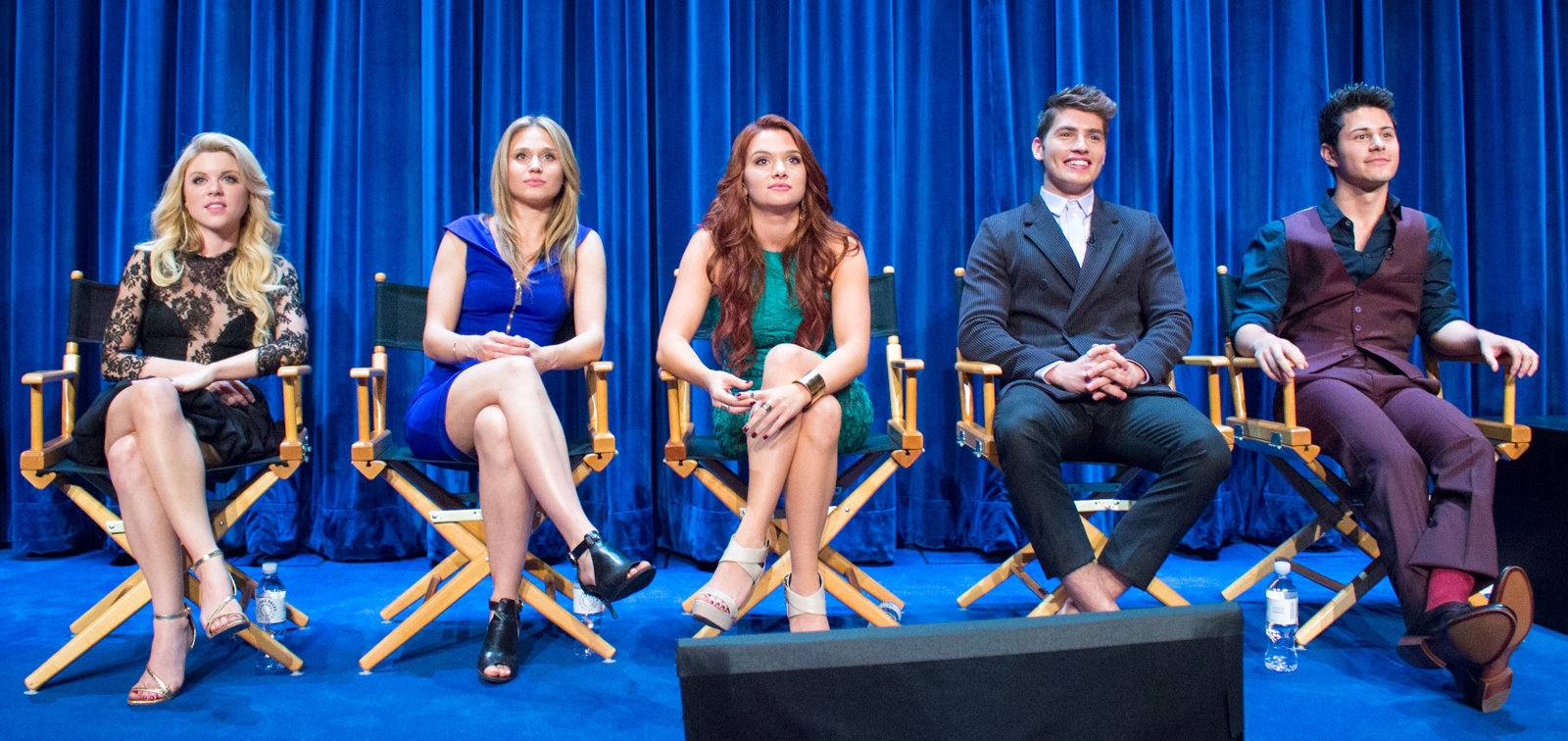
Stevens with her Faking It co-stars in 2014

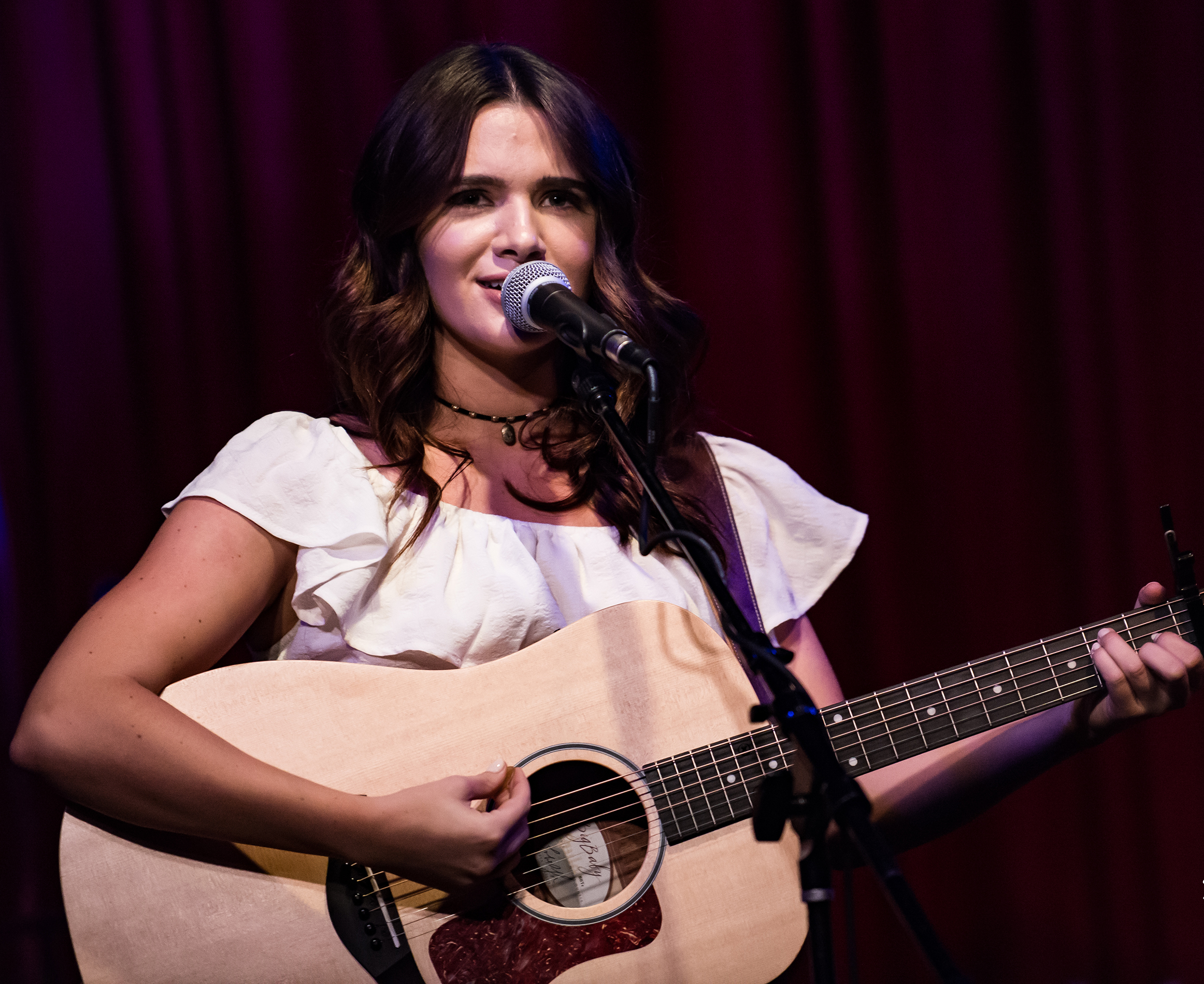
Stevens performing in 2016

After her elimination, Stevens made several appearances on talk shows. On April 16, 2010, she appeared on The Ellen DeGeneres Show where she performed "Over the Rainbow". Stevens also appeared on the Late Show with David Letterman along with Andrew Garcia, where they sang "Superhuman" by Chris Brown and Keri Hilson. She and Garcia appeared on the Wendy Williams Show where she performed "Big Girls Don't Cry".

As of early November 2010, she has written 9 songs. Stevens was a guest performer on Ídolos Portugal on December 12, 2010, where she sang "All I Want for Christmas Is You" by Mariah Carey. In June 2012, Stevens played the title role in Todrick Hall's YouTube sensation "Beauty and the Beat".

Stevens was cast to portray Nadia McConnell in Bare: A Pop Opera in the 2013 Los Angeles revival.

She won the role of Karma Ashcroft in Faking It, which premiered on April 22, 2014. In 2015, Stevens was cast as Lindsey Willows in the CSI finale movie Immortality.

In 2015, Stevens originated the role of Kathryn Merteuil in Cruel Intentions: The '90s Musical in Los Angeles.

In 2016, Stevens was cast as Jane Sloan in The Bold Type which premiered on June 20, 2017, and ran for five seasons.

== Personal life ==
In October 2019, Stevens married musician Paul DiGiovanni after over five years of dating. The couple resides in Nashville, Tennessee. They have two children: a daughter born in February 2023 and a son born in 2026.

== Filmography ==
Film roles
Year	Title	Role	Notes
2013	Bare: A Pop Opera	Nadia McConnell	Stage production
2014	Friends and Romans	Gina DeMaio	
2019	Polaroid	Avery	
2019	Haunt	Harper	

Television roles
Year	Title	Role	Notes
2010	American Idol	Herself	Finished in 8th place (season 9)
2014–2016	Faking It	Karma Ashcroft	Main role
2015	I'll Bring the Awkward	Alexis Martin	Episode: "The Hammer of Destiny"
2015	CSI: Crime Scene Investigation	Lindsey Willows	Episode: "Immortality"
2017–2021	The Bold Type	Jane Sloan	Main role
2019	Dolly Parton's Heartstrings	Lee	Episode: "Two Doors Down"
2020	The Disney Family Singalong: Volume II	Herself	Television special
2020	Celebrity Family Feud	Herself	Episode: "The Bold Type vs. RuPaul's Drag Race"
2022	CSI: Vegas	Lindsey Willows	Episode: "Koala"
2023	Fantasy Island	Gwen	Episode: "Gwenivere of Glendale"
2025	Providence Falls	Cora McLeod	Main role

Music video roles
Year	Title	Artist
2017	"How Not To"	Dan + Shay

== Stage ==
Year	Title	Role	Location(s)	Ref
2015	Cruel Intentions: The '90s Musical	Kathryn Merteuil	Rockwell Table & Stage	
2016	Cruel Intentions: The '90s Musical	Kathryn Merteuil	Hollywood	
