= Siobhan Magnus =

American singer-songwriter (born 1990)

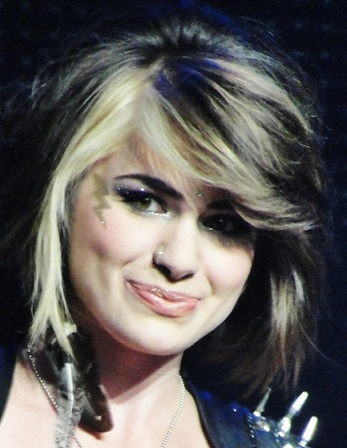
- Siobhan Magnus at her homecoming concert in Mansfield, Massachusetts during American Idol LIVE Tour 2010

Background information
- Born: Siobhan Evelyn Magnus; March 15, 1990 (age 36)
- Origin: Barnstable, Massachusetts, United States
- Genres: Pop, rock, blues, soul
- Occupation: Singer-songwriter
- Instruments: Vocals, piano
- Years active: 2010–present
- Label: Snotface Records

Siobhan Evelyn Magnus (born March 15, 1990) is an American singer-songwriter who was the sixth place finalist on the ninth season of American Idol.

== Biography ==
=== Early life ===
Siobhan Magnus was born on March 15, 1990, to parents Alan and Colleen Magnus. She was raised in Barnstable, Massachusetts, along with her two older brothers, her older sister and her two younger siblings. Magnus' father was a singer-songwriter, her siblings play in various bands, and her brother Rory is in the film animation industry. She is the niece of two musicians: Tracy Ferrie, currently the bassist for Boston and former bassist for Stryper, and Alan Ware, drummer for Ultrasonic Rock Orchestra.

Magnus first started singing in a fourth grade choral concert when she sang "Tomorrow" from the play Annie.

She also previously fronted an alternative rock band called Lunar Valve, also consisting of Ralph Bousquet (lead guitar), Matthew Kohler (bass), and Jordan Bonina (drums).

=== Education ===
Magnus is a 2008 graduate of Barnstable High School in Hyannis, Massachusetts. In school, she was a member of the Barnstable High School Drama Club. When the drama club was filmed for an internet reality show by Warner Brothers, she was featured as one of three Dorothys for the play The Wizard of Oz. In May 2008, in a local profile about Magnus's singing talent, the music department chair of her school district was quoted as saying "Hands down, I think she'd win 'American Idol'." During her senior year in high school, she was voted the most individual girl. She auditioned as a vocal major Berklee College of Music, but was not accepted. She attended Salem State College, but dropped out after one semester. Magnus worked as an apprentice glassblower in Hyannis before taking part in American Idol.

== American Idol ==
Magnus auditioned for American Idol in the summer of 2009 in Boston, and was one of two Massachusetts contestants to make the semi-finals of the show. Magnus emerged as an early contender after her interpretation of "Think" by Aretha Franklin and "Paint It Black" by The Rolling Stones. Magnus' vocal range and dramatic performances prompted judge Kara DioGuardi to compare her to Season 8 runner-up Adam Lambert. Magnus' elimination during Top 6 week came as a surprise to many Idol experts. It was reported that as a result, many fans of Magnus had vowed not to watch the rest of the American Idol season. The week after Magnus' dismissal, American Idol had its lowest ratings since 2002. Magnus, along with twelfth season finalist Angie Miller, are the only finalists on American Idol from Massachusetts.

=== Performances ===
Week #	Theme	Song choice	Original artist	Order #	Result
Audition	Auditioner's Choice	"Love of My Life"	Queen	N/A	Advanced
Hollywood	First Solo	"A Woman's Worth"	Alicia Keys	N/A	Advanced
Hollywood	Group Round	"Bad Romance"	Lady Gaga	N/A	Advanced
Hollywood	Second Solo	"Living for the City"	Stevie Wonder	N/A	Advanced
Top 24 (12 Women)	Billboard Hot 100 Hits	"Wicked Game"	Chris Isaak	10	Safe
Top 20 (10 Women)	Billboard Hot 100 Hits	"Think"	Aretha Franklin	10	Safe
Top 16 (8 Women)	Billboard Hot 100 Hits	"The House of the Rising Sun"	(traditional)	2	Safe
Top 12	The Rolling Stones	"Paint It Black"	The Rolling Stones	8	Safe
Top 11	Billboard No. 1 Hits	"Superstition"	Stevie Wonder	11	Safe
Top 10	R&B/Soul	"Through the Fire"	Chaka Khan	1	Safe
Top 9	Lennon–McCartney	"Across the Universe"	The Beatles	8	Safe
Top 9^{1}	Elvis Presley	"Suspicious Minds"	Mark James	6	Safe
Top 7	Inspirational Songs	"When You Believe"	Mariah Carey & Whitney Houston	5	Safe
Top 6	Shania Twain	"Any Man of Mine"	Shania Twain	6	Eliminated

^Note 1 Due to the judges using their one save to save Michael Lynche, the Top 9 remained intact for another week.

== Post-Idol ==
Siobhan Magnus performing in Staples Center, Los Angeles on August 13, 2010

After her elimination, Magnus gave several media appearances and performed "House of the Rising Sun" on The Ellen DeGeneres Show, and "Paint It Black" on the Late Show with David Letterman. Letterman would go on to say to Magnus "I don't know why they voted you off, frankly I don't care. As far as I'm concerned, you should be our American Idol". Magnus also visited the If I Can Dream house and sang "I Will Come to You" by Hanson and also "Halo" by Beyoncé. She visited the house a second time with the Top 10 contestants, and sang many songs, including "Wicked Game", "No One", "Creep", and "Umbrella". She also made an appearance on The Wendy Williams Show performing "Summertime".

Magnus returned to the finale of American Idol on May 26, 2010, and sang "How Deep Is Your Love" with Aaron Kelly, who were both joined by the Bee Gees. She also had group performances with Alice Cooper, Christina Aguilera and Janet Jackson.

On June 9, 2010, Magnus performed with childhood Idols Hanson at the Bardot in Hollywood, California. Magnus actually declared the experience (performing with Hanson) was "better than winning American Idol."

Magnus was featured in the American Idols LIVE! Tour 2010, where she sang The Rolling Stones' "Paint It Black", No Doubt's "Spiderwebs" and Muse's "Stockholm Syndrome." She also sang in two group performances: Miley Cyrus's "The Climb" and Kelly Clarkson's "My Life Would Suck Without You". Her debut album "Moonbaby" was released in 2012.

== Solo career ==
Magnus recorded her debut album, Moonbaby, with Nashville-based Pacific International Music. Her first single, "Beatrice Dream", was released to iTunes on May 1, and her second single, "Black Doll", was released to iTunes on October 3. 1,000 pre-release copies of the album were made available for purchase through her official website in December 2011. "Moonbaby" was made available through digital retailers on January 22, 2012.

In March 2013, Magnus showcased a new band called Doubtful Guest, featuring several members of bands from the 1990s. The showcase was held in Nashville at 12th and Porter on March 27, 2013.

On July 8, 2014, during Boston's Heaven on Earth Tour to support Life, Love & Hope, Magnus performed "Walk On" in Buffalo, New York, on July 22 at the Sandia Casino in Albuquerque, New Mexico, on August 5 at the USANA Amphitheatre in Salt Lake City, Utah and on September 3 at the Ford Idaho Center in Nampa, Idaho as a lead and backup vocalist.

In 2014, Magnus recorded the song "Wisdom" as the theme song for the movie The Wisdom to Know the Difference, "Wisdom" was included on her 2015 EP release Holiday Inspiration, which also included recordings of "What Child Is This?", "O Holy Night", "Old Cape Cod", and "Did You Ever Wonder Why" The EP was made available only through her website as a CD.

In November 2016, she released a single, "Breakfast in Bed", under her label Millbilly Music.

She has also contributed vocals to video game soundtracks, including The End Is Nigh, Blade Strangers, and Mewgenics.

== Discography ==
=== Solo ===
Year	Album details
2012	Moonbaby: Released: January 22, 2012; Label: Snotface Records; Formats: CD, digital download
2013	Old Cape Cod: Released:February 28, 2013; Label: Snotface Records; Formats: Vinyl, digital download
2015	Holiday Inspiration (EP)

== Singles ==
Single	Year	Peak chart positions	Album
Single	Year	US	Album
"Beatrice Dream"	2011	—	Moonbaby
"Black Doll"	2011	—	Moonbaby
"Old Cape Cod"	2013	—	Old Cape Cod
"Wisdom"	2014	—	Wisdom
"Breakfast in Bed"	2016	—	Breakfast in Bed
"—" denotes releases that did not chart
