= Andrew Garcia =

American singer (born 1985)

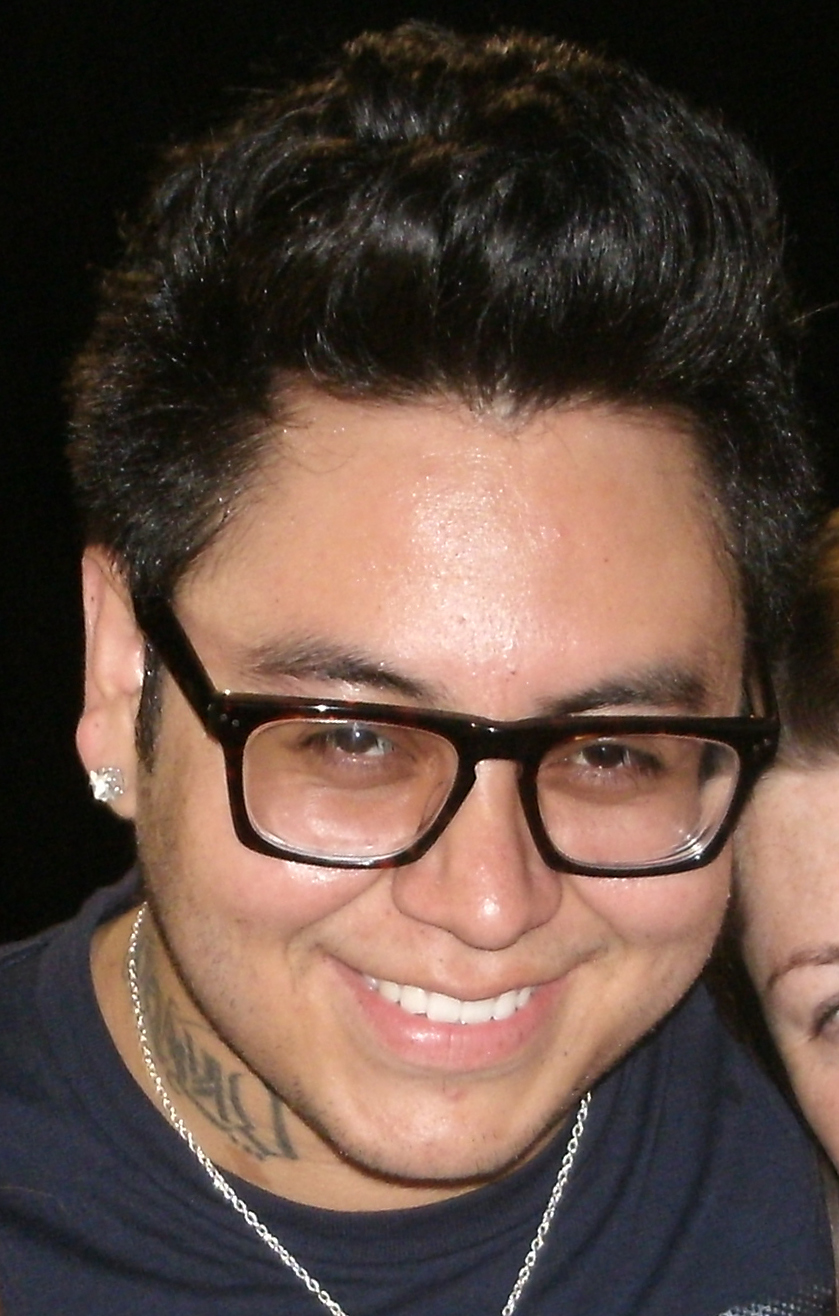
- Andrew Garcia in July 2010.

Background information
- Born: Andrew Adrian Garcia; October 18, 1985 (age 40)
- Origin: Moreno Valley, California, United States
- Genres: Pop, R&B
- Occupation: Singer
- Instruments: Vocals, guitar
- Years active: 2010–present
- Formerly of: Yesterday, Today, Forever

Andrew Adrian Garcia (born October 18, 1985) is an American singer-songwriter who was the ninth place finalist on the ninth season of American Idol. Garcia has released two EPs and numerous standalone singles. He has also collaborated with several artists.

In 2014, Garcia was featured on the track "GTFO My Room" by Ryan Higa, which placed on the Billboard World Digital Song Sales chart. That same year, Garcia was part of a group whose rendition of "Roar" received a Streamy Award nomination for Best Cover Song. Garcia was also featured on the song "Airplanes and Terminals", which received a Streamy Award nomination for Best Original Song.

== Early life and career ==
According to The New York Times, Garcia was "already something of a star" by the time he auditioned for American Idol, due to popularity he had accumulated covering songs on YouTube.

== American Idol ==
Garcia auditioned for the ninth season in Pasadena, California. He sang "Sunday Morning" by Maroon 5 and was praised by all the judges, notably Simon Cowell, who called him a "genuinely good singer," as well as guest judge Katy Perry. He later appeared in Hollywood, where he sang Paula Abdul's song "Straight Up" and since has been particularly known for that performance.

Garcia was eliminated on April 14, 2010, along with Katie Stevens.

=== Performances/Results ===
Week #	Theme	Song choice	Original artist	Order #	Result
Audition	Auditioner's Choice	"Sunday Morning"	Maroon 5	N/A	Advanced
First Solo	N/A	"Straight Up"	Paula Abdul	N/A	Advanced
Group Round	N/A	"No One"	Alicia Keys	N/A	Advanced
Second Solo	N/A	"Chasing Pavements"	Adele	N/A	Advanced
Top 24 (12 Men)	Billboard Hot 100 Hits	"Sugar, We're Goin Down"	Fall Out Boy	12	Safe
Top 20 (10 Men)	Billboard Hot 100 Hits	"You Give Me Something"	James Morrison	7	Safe
Top 16 (8 Men)	Billboard Hot 100 Hits	"Genie in a Bottle"	Christina Aguilera	4	Safe
Top 12	The Rolling Stones	"Gimme Shelter"	The Rolling Stones	5	Safe
Top 11	Billboard No. 1 Hits	"I Heard It Through the Grapevine"	Marvin Gaye	7	Safe
Top 10	R&B/Soul	"Forever"	Chris Brown	6	Safe
Top 9	Lennon–McCartney	"Can't Buy Me Love"	The Beatles	3	Bottom 3^{1}
Top 9^{2}	Elvis Presley	"Hound Dog"	Big Mama Thornton	2	Eliminated

- ^Note 1 When Ryan Seacrest announced the results for this particular night, Garcia was among the Bottom 3 but declared safe second, as Michael Lynche was saved from elimination by the judges.
- ^Note 2 Due to the judges using their one save to save Michael Lynche, the Top 9 remained intact for another week.

== Post-Idol ==
Garcia was featured in the American Idols LIVE! Tour 2010, where he sang "Straight Up" by Paula Abdul and "Sunday Morning" by Maroon 5.

Garcia released his first single "Crazy" on June 7, 2011. That same year, he was featured on the track "BRB" from the album DFD, by the artist Dumbfoundead.

In 2011, Garcia performed shows with a group called Yesterday, Today, Forever (or YTF), a musical and comedy performing group. The group performed their first concert on October 9, 2011, in Honolulu, Hawaii.

In 2013 Garcia released the single "Dumb".

Garcia has appeared in Nigahiga videos, and in 2014, the two collaborated on the song "GTFO My Room", which peaked at No. 6 on the Billboard Comedy Digital Track Sales chart. That same year, Garcia shared a Streamy Award nomination for Best Cover Song with Andy Lange, Chester See, and Josh Golden for their rendition of "Roar". Another song by Garcia, "Airplanes and Terminals", received a 2014 Streamy Award nomination for Best Original Song. Garcia recorded "Airplanes & Terminals" with G Seven and Traphik.

In 2015, Garcia released the EP Hell and Back. The track "Ghost" was released as a single in 2014, leading up to the EP's release. That same year, Garcia was featured on the track "Waiting" from the EP Redline, by Avalon Young, who a year later, placed in the top 8 on American Idol's fifteenth season. In 2016, Garcia released the non-album single "Too Fast".

In 2017, Garcia released the EP, Love Wounds. A week before the EP's release, the single "Hurts Like Hell" premiered on Billboard. Garcia also released three non-album singles in 2017: "Colder", "Hold You Down", and "Hollywood Hills".

Mark Franklin of The York Dispatch positively reviewed both of Garcia's EPs, calling "Ghost" a "standout" from Hell and Back and praising Love Wounds for its "impassioned ballads".

In 2018, Garcia released the non-album singles "Lose You" and "Groupie".

Garcia went on the Sweet290 tour with Brian Puspos, August Rigo and J. Rabon.

== Discography ==
=== EPs ===
Year	Title
2015	Hell and Back
2017	Love Wounds

=== Singles ===
Year	Title	Album
2011	"Crazy"	Non-album single
2013	"Airplanes & Terminals"(with G Seven and Traphik)	Non-album single
2013	"Dumb"	Non-album single
2014	"Ghost"	Hell and Back
2016	"Too Fast"	Non-album single
2017	"Hurts Like Hell"	Love Wounds
2017	"Colder"	Non-album single
2017	"Hold You Down"	Non-album single
2017	"Hollywood Hills"	Non-album single
2018	"Lose You"	Non-album single
2018	"Groupie"	Non-album single

=== As featured artist ===
Year	Title	Album	Peak chart position
Year	Title	Album	Comedy Digital Track Sales
2011	"BRB" (Dumbfoundead featuring Andrew Garcia)	DFD	
2014	"GTFO My Room" (Ryan Higa featuring Andrew Garcia)	Non-album single	6
2015	"Waiting" (Avalon Young featuring Andrew Garcia)	Redline	

== Awards and nominations ==
Year	Awards	Nominee / work	Category	Result
2014	Streamy Awards	"Roar" (w/ Andy Lange, Chester See, and Josh Golden)	Cover Song	Nominated
