= Tylor Chase =

American actor and YouTuber (born 1989)

- Born: Tylor Kurtis Mendez; September 6, 1989 (age 37); Chandler, Arizona, U.S.
- Occupation: Actor
- Years active: 2004–2021 (Note: His time as an actor was from 2004 to 2011, he was active on YouTube from 2014 to 2021.)
- Known for: Martin Qwerly in Ned's Declassified School Survival Guide

Tylor Chase (born Tylor Kurtis Mendez on September 6, 1989) is an American former actor and YouTuber, best known for his role as Martin Qwerly in the Nickelodeon series Ned's Declassified School Survival Guide (2004–2007).

== Early life ==
Chase was born Tylor Kurtis Mendez on September 6, 1989, in Phoenix, Arizona to Joseph Mendez Jr. and Paula Moisio. His family moved to the Los Angeles County area, and he began acting as a teenager in the early 2000s.

== Career ==
Chase played Martin Qwerly, a recurring character on the Nickelodeon comedy series Ned's Declassified School Survival Guide, which aired from 2004 to 2007. The show ran for three seasons and followed the lives of middle school students.

In addition to his work on Ned's Declassified, Chase appeared in the 2005 television series Everybody Hates Chris and played Young Adam in the 2007 independent film Good Time Max, directed by and starring James Franco. He also provided voice work for the video game L.A. Noire in 2011.

In 2020, Chase self-published two books; the first in January titled A Vampire's Salvation: Shrine and Ellen (The Tales of Shrine Book 1), and the second in July titled SO BE IT: Says Jehovah (Shrine and Ellen Book 2), both under the pen name "Shrine Tylor".

== Personal life ==
Beginning in the mid-2010s, Chase used a personal YouTube channel and live poetry performances to share spoken-word pieces about his mental health. A 2014 poem titled "Bipolar" and later "Bipolar vlogs" videos addressed his experiences with bipolar disorder and isolation, and he continued posting similar material until at least 2021.

In September 2025, Chase was discovered homeless on the streets of Riverside, California, in videos that went viral on TikTok. The clips sparked concern about his wellbeing and prompted online discussion about the challenges faced by former child actors and about filming homeless people for social media. His former Ned's Declassified co-stars Devon Werkheiser, Daniel Curtis Lee, and Lindsey Shaw discussed Chase's situation on their podcast and stated they were working to help their former colleague.

Following a new viral video in December 2025, a GoFundMe campaign was launched, raising $1,207 before being shut down. Chase's mother allegedly said that Chase "needs medical help instead of money." The same month, Shaun Weiss, star of The Mighty Ducks film series, who previously overcame his own struggles with addiction and homelessness, publicly offered to help Chase. Weiss announced he had secured a bed at a detox facility and long-term treatment at Eleven 11 Recovery in San Clemente, California. However, he noted that Chase still needed to be located and agree to accept help. Chase was evaluated by a crisis center and determined to need immediate help. He was hospitalized at a local hospital on a 72-hour hold at the care of Riverside County, California officials. He was released after 36 hours.

== Filmography ==
=== Television and film ===
Year	Title	Role	Notes
2004–2007	Ned's Declassified School Survival Guide	Martin Qwerly	Recurring role; 33 episodes
2005	Everybody Hates Chris	Kid No. 4	Episode: "Everybody Hates Sausage"
2006	Confessions of a Late Bloomer	Donny	Short film
2007	Good Time Max	Young Adam	Feature film

=== Video games ===
Year	Title	Role	Notes
2011	L.A. Noire	Hank Newbern	Voice and motion capture
