= List of Ned's Declassified School Survival Guide episodes =

This is a list of Ned's Declassified School Survival Guide episodes in chronological order. The series originally aired from September 12, 2004 to June 8, 2007 on Nickelodeon.

== Series overview ==
Season	Episodes	Originally released	
Season	Episodes	First released	Last released
1	13	September 12, 2004	February 19, 2005
2	20	October 1, 2005	June 3, 2006
3	21	September 24, 2006	June 8, 2007

== Episodes ==
=== Pilots (2003–04) ===
The original series pilot was called Ned's Classified School Survival Guide and featured "Boogie" (rather than Cookie) played by Stephen Markarian, who was on the later series as Albert Wormenheimer. The pilot aired once on Nickelodeon, as a special, on September 7, 2003. The character was recast after the pilot, and the role of Cookie went to Daniel Curtis Lee to show racial diversity in the school. A second pilot with the revised cast was filmed, but was never aired. After these episodes were filmed, production was stopped until the following year. The pilot special was considered a success, so Ned's Declassified School Survival Guide was ordered to series in early 2004 for a first season of 13 episodes to air in the 2004–05 television season.

- Pilot (aired on September 7, 2003)
- "Ned's Locker" (unaired)

=== Season 1 (2004–05) ===
This season follows Ned and his friends through the first semester of seventh grade.

No. overall	No. in season	Title	Directed by	Written by	Original release date	Prod. code
1	1	"First Day & Lockers"	David Kendall	Scott Fellows	September 12, 2004	101
Moze wants to take a different elective than the guys in order to make new girl friends, but Ned refuses to let it happen; Cookie wears a heavy winter coat on the first day to impress girls. Ned gets a locker next to Timmy Toot-Toot and searches for a new one; Moze competes with Suzie to have the best locker in the school; Cookie's locker is far away from gym class, leading him to go to great lengths to avoid being late.
2	2	"Bathrooms & Project Partners"	Paul Hoen	Scott Fellows & Joe Fallon	September 19, 2004	102
Ned tries to find the girl who kissed his name on the "hottie list" in the girls' bathroom; Moze becomes afraid of the bathroom when The Huge Crew takes over; Cookie has to go to the bathroom all day, and in panic, accidentally runs into the girls' bathroom, a blunder Ned once experienced in kindergarten. Moze chooses Seth to be her project partner, but he refuses to do any work; Loomer steals Ned and Cookie's baby for life science class.
3	3	"Detention & Teachers"	Jonathan Winfrey	Lazar Saric	September 26, 2004	103
Cookie, Ned and Moze all get detention after throwing a paper airplane by accident, and they are at risk from older students. Ned tries to get a better grade in science by becoming the teacher's pet, but eventually realizes the only way to improve his grade is to actually do the work; Moze's math class goes wild when they get a student teacher, prompting Moze to help him; Cookie grades begin slipping in his Spanish class because of his attractive teacher.
4	4	"Seating & Tryouts"	Fred Savage	Scott Fellows	October 3, 2004	104
Ned tries to sit at the cool table at lunch; Moze sits at the front of the class and does well; Cookie devises a plan to get the biggest bounce on the back seat of the bus. Ned tries out for basketball; Moze tries out for everything to compete with Suzie; Cookie tries out for cheerleading.
5	5	"Crushes & Dances"	Paul Hoen	Rick Groel & Mike Preister	October 10, 2004	105
Ned tries to ask Suzie to the dance; Moze avoids Coconut Head, who she thinks wants to ask her to the dance; Cookie creates a perfect match program, but he can't get it to match him with the girl he wants. Ned plans to dance with Suzie, but is constantly blocked by her on-again, off-again relationship with Seth; Cookie convinces a supermodel to accompany him to the dance, but their time is interrupted by a Siberian Husky; Moze tries to encourage Ned and Cookie that they are supposed to have fun at a dance; Gordy tries to catch the weasel at the dance, but fails.
6	6	"Sick Days & Spelling Bees"	Adam Weissman	Joe Fallon	October 17, 2004	106
Ned must avoid getting sick during flu season when a special guest (and his hero) visits the school; Moze tries to purposely get sick in order to get out of speaking in front of her class; Cookie is sick but tries to avoid getting caught by the nurse in order to keep his perfect attendance record intact. Ned tries to help Cookie win a spelling bee in order to stop the 'Killer Bees', a trio of students bent on winning; Moze is assigned as a judge for the spelling bee and is forced to sit next to a disgusting teacher.
7	7	"Rumors & Photo Day"	Fred Savage	Lazar Saric & Joe Fallon	November 7, 2004	107
A rumor spreads around school that Ned and Moze are dating; Cookie and Gordy attempt to pull off the rumored "Atomic Flush" by flushing every toilet in the school at once. Ned helps Moze learn how to smile for her school photo; Cookie looks for someone to take his perfect school photo.
8	8	"Talent Shows & Elections"	Jonathan Winfrey	Lazar Saric & Scott Fellows	November 28, 2004	108
The school talent show is coming, but it is always the same boring acts. So Ned, Moze and Cookie organize an alternative talent show called "Talentpalooza" where the students have free rein to perform the talents they want. Ned is unknowingly nominated for class president. He initially wants to back out, but Moze and Cookie convince him to run so he can beat Suzie Crabgrass and Doug, the most popular guy in school.
9	9	"Computer Labs & Backpacks"	Fred Savage	Mike Preister & Rick Groel	January 2, 2005	109
Ned and Moze attempt to finish their class projects, but their roughhousing gets them banned indefinitely from the computer lab; Cookie's computer system breaks down and, with the help of Lisa Zemo, he learns to live life without computers. Ned gets a new backpack from Backpack Boy, which he cannot handle; Moze desperately looks for her lost backpack, which has her personal diary in it; Cookie invents the "body pack".
10	10	"Notes & Best Friends"	Paul Hoen	Lazar Saric & Scott Fellows	January 9, 2005	110
Ned gets caught passing notes in class for Bitsy and is determined to get her back for it; Moze finds a love note written to her, which she suspects was written by Loomer; Cookie gets excuse notes from Le Forger, which allows him to get away with anything. Ned and Cookie's friendship falters when Cookie joins the Killer Bees; Moze tries to make friends with the Huge Crew.
11	11	"Daydreaming & Gym"	Joe Menendez	Scott Fellows & Lazar Saric	February 5, 2005	111
Ned daydreams that he, Moze and Cookie are secret agents trying to save the class from Sweeney, who is holding the class hostage with a science riddle. (Note: Special appearance from Cosmo and Wanda from The Fairly OddParents.) Moze and Ned face off in the martial arts class taught by Coach Stax (Fred Williamson); Cookie refuses to get sweaty, so he gets Seth to do gym for him.
12	12	"Cheaters & Bullies"	Chip Hurd	Mike Preister & Rick Groel	February 12, 2005	112
Ned must cram for the biggest test of the year and refuses the temptation to cheat; Moze tries to stop Bitsy from cheating off of her; Cookie is forced to take a test without technology when Sweeney believes him to be cheating. Ned and Cookie constantly get bullied by Loomer, so they try to get him kicked out of school; Moze wants to start a peer mediation program but she needs a faculty advisor.
13	13	"Emergency Drills & The Late Bus"	Fred Savage	Rick Groel & Joe Fallon	February 19, 2005	113
Emergency drills consistently interfere with Ned's attempts to ask Suzie out; Moze is worried about a pimple on her face; Cookie digs a series of tunnels to in order to get out of school faster. Ned, Moze and Cookie's bus is late; Ned tries to help Loomer ask Moze out, but Ned accidentally helps Loomer ask Suzie out instead; Moze makes friends with another girl named Jennifer; Cookie gives a tour of the school after hours.

=== Season 2 (2005–06) ===
This season follows Ned and his friends through the second semester of seventh grade.

No. overall	No. in season	Title	Directed by	Written by	Original release date	Prod. code
14	1	"New Semester & Electives"	Paul Hoen	Scott Fellows	October 1, 2005	201
Ned wants a kiss with Suzie this semester, but Suzie is going out with Loomer; Cookie attempts to be cooler by becoming a completely new person. Ned, Moze and Cookie try to get an electives class together, but they cannot agree on which elective to choose.
15	2	"Pep Rallies & Lunch"	Savage Steve Holland	Rick Groel & Mike Preister	October 8, 2005	202
Ned tries to get people excited for the pep rally, but the whole school lacks pep; Moze must give a speech at the pep rally; Cookie prepares to do a stunt for the whole school. Ned tries to stop One Bite, a kid who takes one huge bite out of everyone's lunches; Moze wonders why Suzie will not sit with her at lunch; Cookie becomes paranoid after the lunch lady predicts that he will be creamed, crushed, mashed, and black-eyed.
16	3	"School Clubs & Video Projects"	Joe Menendez	Lazar Saric & Scott Fellows	October 15, 2005	203
Ned is determined to shut down "Missy's Declassified School Survival Manual" Club for feeding its members the wrong information to survive school; Moze and Suzie compete to be the best in every club; Cookie starts an archaeology club which involves tunneling through the school. Ned and Cookie team up for a video project, but they cannot decide what to make their project about; Moze films a documentary on Mr. Wright, but he does not act like himself; Martin Qwerly becomes the laughing stock of the school after a video of him goofing around (similar to the Star Wars Kid) is discovered.
17	4	"Notebooks & Math"	David Kendall	Lazar Saric & Mike Preister	October 22, 2005	204
Ned steals Sweeney's "golden notebook" to help him study for a test; Moze finds a notebook full of rumors, and others come to believe that Suzie Crabgrass was the one who wrote it; Cookie starts recording video instead of taking notes. Ned starts a math-study group with the smartest kids to avoid his fear of math; Moze develops math anxiety when she does not understand algebra; Cookie moves up to 8th grade math taught by Dr. Xavier and tries to make it fun for everyone; Gordy refuses to use math while trying to catch the Weasel.
18	5	"Vice Principals & Mondays"	Savage Steve Holland	Scott Fellows	November 5, 2005	206
A series of school property destruction incidents leads to the introduction of Vice Principal Crubbs, who suspects Ned, Moze and Cookie as the culprits. So, the three take the investigation into their own hands, CSI-style. Ned and Moze try to come up with ideas to beat the Monday morning blues; Cookie must help Gordy stay awake on Monday.
19	6	"Your Body & Procrastination"	Joe Menendez	Rick Groel & Gene Grillo	November 12, 2005	207
Ned sets out to increase his strength, and Coach Dirga helps him prepare for a lifting contest against Loomer; Moze worries that she is too tall; Cookie invents ways to protect himself from Loomer, but they all backfire. Moze bets Ned that he will never finish his project on time; Cookie invents a reminder system, which Lisa Zemo hacks into.
20	7	"Gross Biology Dissection & Upperclassmen"	David Kendall	Mike Preister & Scott Fellows	November 19, 2005	208
Ned is torn between Suzie, who is against dissection, and Moze, who wants to do dissection, during a biology dissection project; Ned helps Suzie by stealing the frog from Sweeney's classroom, and Cookie and Gordy grow attached to it. Ned offers to give a fifth grader a tour of the school, but the kid is very wild and unruly; Moze gets the attention of an eighth grader, Jock Goldman; Cookie must pretend that he is in eighth grade for Vanessa, a girl he likes who is actually in eighth grade.
21	8	"Dares & Bad Habits"	Savage Steve Holland	Lazar Saric & Rick Groel	January 14, 2006	209
Classmates dare Ned to ask out Missy; Moze must wear a dress as part of a dare and meets three girls she suspects are robots; Cookie competes with Loomer to be the "King of Dares". Ned tries to fix his bad habit of saying yes to everyone; Moze tries to fix her habit of trash-talking; Cookie tries to replace his technology hoarding habit with something else.
22	9	"Substitute Teachers & The New Kid"	Joe Menendez	Scott Fellows & Mike Preister	January 21, 2006	210
Ned helps his favorite substitute teacher from elementary school connect with the students; Moze tricks her substitutes into doing things that were not intended by her regular teacher, Mr. Sweeney; Cookie becomes a substitute teacher. Ned tries to help a new girl adapt to the school, but she claims Ned as her boyfriend; Cookie acts like a British man when he moves to 8th grade English, but he is afraid of getting exposed when there is an actual British kid in the class; Moze inadvertently starts a school cleaning olympics between Gordy and his new assistant, Jack, for the head custodian spot.
23	10	"Valentine's Day & School Websites"	Paul Hoen	Scott Fellows & Rick Groel	February 11, 2006	205
Ned accidentally sends the Huge Crew a love letter meant for Suzie; Moze gets the most roses and is dubbed "The Hottest Girl in School"; Cookie sends himself roses to make sure he gets the most. Ned, Moze and Cookie make changes to the school website, but problems soon arise; The Weasel takes control of the live webcam, which broadcasts embarrassing footage of Mr. Sweeney, who threatens to give the students detention for life; Moze is determined to take down a "Volleybabes" pop-up ad; Seth changes the website's password, but doesn't remember what it is, so they have trouble shutting down the website.
24	11	"Shyness & Nicknames"	Bethany Rooney	Gene Grillo & Rick Groel	February 25, 2006	211
Ned and Moze try to befriend the shy Oboe twins; Ned tells Stacy to face her fears and talk to Missy, while Moze finds out that Tracy is dependent on whoever she is with, and will dress exactly like that person; Cookie runs a shyness seminar where the attendants do all the stunts Cookie has done in the past on the show in order to overcome their shyness. Ned tries to create a cool nickname for himself after he is given the embarrassing nickname "Wedgepicker"; Moze tries to get rid of her "Moze" nickname and just be "Jennifer"; Cookie creates a nickname generator, which Loomer uses to pick on people.
25	12	"Asking Someone Out & Recycling"	Joe Menendez	Scott Fellows & Frank Berin	March 4, 2006	212
Ned tries to find out if Suzie will go on a date with him; Moze attempts to ask Seth out; Cookie helps Dr. Xavier ask Gordy out. Ned, Moze and Cookie compete to collect the most recyclables to win a bike, causing Ned to inadvertently lose the Guide in the process; Cookie strings bottles together and is considered an artist.
26	13	"April Fools Day & Excuses"	Savage Steve Holland	Lazar Saric & Scott Fellows	March 25, 2006	215
Vice Principal Crubbs pranks everyone on April Fools Day, so Ned, Cookie and Gordy devise a plan to prank him back; Moze attempts to break up with Seth, but he thinks it is an April Fools joke; the new superintendent also comes to visit. A dog eats Ned's homework, but Sweeney doesn't believe him until the dog eats Sweeney's work, so the two team up to catch the dog; when Moze blows off a date with Seth, she makes up an excuse that her grandmother is in the hospital, but Seth wants to meet Moze's grandmother; Vanessa tells the same excuse to Cookie, but he does not believe it until he accidentally sends Vanessa's grandmother falling down the stairs.
27	14	"Secrets & School Car Wash"	David Kendall	Cynthia True & Lazar Saric	April 8, 2006	214
Ned and Cookie catch Loomer kissing Missy, and Loomer threatens to beat them up if they tell anyone, especially Suzie; Moze partners up with Seth and finds out that he has other students do his work for him. The boys and girls compete in a car wash fundraiser.
28	15	"Spirit Week & Clothes"	Adam Weissman	Eddie Guzelian & Magda Liolis	April 15, 2006	213
Ned battles with Martin for the position of Spirit Week King because Suzie is shoo-in for Spirit Week Queen, and the King and Queen traditionally end up dating; Cookie gets the Spirit Stick but tries to hand it off to Moze because he doesn't want the responsibility of preventing the school being cursed. Ned tries to find the right clothes to wear; Moze attempts to be fashionable after she gets a ticket from Missy's "Fashion Police"; Cookie and Crony design "The Ultimate School Uniform".
29	16	"Yearbook & Career Week"	Dan Coffie	Gene Grillo	April 29, 2006	217
Ned wants to be next to Suzie in the "Best" of section in the yearbook; Moze wants to improve the yearbook, but nothing is for free; Cookie puts himself in many group yearbook photos, even those he is not a part of. Vice Principal Crubbs wants Ned to pursue a career as a vice principal; Moze pursues a career as a sports star with Cookie as her manager.
30	17	"Music Class & Class Clown"	Joe Menendez	Magda Liolis & Scott Fellows	May 6, 2006	218
Ned wants to be a rock star instead of being in Mr. Gibson's (Art Alexakis) music class; Moze is taking music appreciation class with Mr. Combover and gets Mozart stuck in her head; Cookie must play an instrument that is not a computer. The class clown moves out of town, causing the teachers to give more quizzes and homework which forces the students to search for a new class clown – Ned and Cookie each try to be the class clown and even hold auditions to be class clown, but it doesn't work out; Moze finds a student who is a good prospect to be the new class clown, but he refuses to act funny for anyone else except Moze.
31	18	"Failing & Tutors"	Chip Hurd	Rick Groel	May 13, 2006	219
Ned must do well on all of his final exams, but is currently predicted to fail by the school counselor; Moze overreacts to one F, dropping activities for more study time; Cookie deliberately tries to fail in order to not skip eighth grade. Ned struggles to find a tutor to avoid summer school; Moze tutors eighth graders, but they all find her too attractive to learn; Cookie must work with Timmy Toot-Toot on a project.
32	19	"Science Fair & Study Hall"	Joe Menendez	Scott Fellows & Lazar Saric	May 20, 2006	216
Ned enlists Moze's help to win a ribbon in the science fair; Cookie attempts to impress Vanessa and her grandmother. Ned tries to study for a test, but he is constantly distracted; Moze gets injured and must wear a traction device, which makes nobody want to talk to her; Cookie tries to sneak out of study hall to meet Vanessa, but the teacher refuses to give him the bathroom pass early.
33	20	"Double Dating & The Last Day"	Fred Savage	Scott Fellows & Lazar Saric	June 3, 2006	220
Ned and Suzie go on a double date with Moze and Jock Goldman, but Ned kisses Moze by accident; Cookie agrees to take both Vanessa and Lisa Zemo to the dance. Ned and Moze are afraid to break the news to Suzie that they kissed; Cookie's robot goes on a rampage on the last day of school.

=== Season 3 (2006–07) ===
This season follows Ned and his friends through eighth grade.

No. overall	No. in season	Title	Directed by	Written by	Original release date	Prod. code
34	1	"A New Grade & Dodgeball"	Savage Steve Holland	Scott Fellows & Eddie Guzelian	September 24, 2006	301
On the first day of eighth grade, Ned is mistaken for the new school bully after he accidentally punches Loomer; Moze attempts to make friends with a new teacher, named iTeacher, who is teaching from home via a computer; Cookie helps Gordy get the school WiFi information out of Crubbs. He also becomes attracted to Lisa Zemo, who has gotten a complete makeover and gotten rid of her allergies. Ned is made captain of the first team in dodgeball for gym class, with Loomer named as the other captain; Moze refuses to play after she thinks she hurt Coconut Head; Cookie turns to the dark side after he joins Loomer's team.
35	2	"Reading & Principals"	Jonathan Judge	Frank Berin & Lazar Saric	October 1, 2006	302
Ned struggles to read a real book; Moze starts a book club, whose members just want to gossip, and Cookie attempts to get into the club too. Vice Principal Crubbs schemes to become the new principal, after Principal Pal (John Bliss) retires, by stopping all of the interviewees from making their interviews; Ned and Cookie try to convince someone else in the school to challenge Crubbs by interviewing for the job, while Moze and Gordy try to convince Principal Pal not to leave.
36	3	"Popularity & Stressin' Out"	David Kendall	Lazar Saric & Scott Fellows	October 15, 2006	304
A new popularity list is posted – Missy "helps" Ned become popular so that he can ask Suzie out; Moze is in the top 10, but she does not like being popular; Cookie tries to find the list maker so that he can be made more popular. Ned becomes stressed that Suzie has another boyfriend; Moze becomes stressed that she will end up like iTeacher; Cookie competes with his rival Evelyn Kwong for the best test grade.
37	4	"Dismissal & The School Play"	Joe Menendez	Scott Fellows & Eddie Guzelian	October 22, 2006	308
Ned, Moze and Cookie must make it to the bus on time; Suzie moves into Ned's locker, which messes with his dismissal routine; Moze and all the other girls are forced to wait to use the bathroom; Cookie accidentally kisses Evelyn Kwong and must avoid her. The school puts on a production of Romeo and Juliet; Ned is determined to stop Spencer, who is playing Romeo, from kissing Suzie, who is playing Juliet; Moze, the stage manager, is determined to stop Ned and keep the play on track; Cookie helps Ned so that he can get the role of Romeo.
38	5	"Halloween & Vampires, Ghosts, Werewolves, and Zombies"	Savage Steve Holland	Scott Fellows & Lazar Saric	October 29, 2006	303
The kids set up a Halloween party at Polk, and Principal Pal is thought to be dead after he enters the haunted hall. Polk becomes a Halloween nightmare, where Ned is a vampire, Cookie is a werewolf, Moze is a ghost, and Gordy is a zombie.
39	6	"Art Class & Lost and Found"	Savage Steve Holland	Frank Berin & Vince Cheung and Ben Montanio	November 5, 2006	305
Ned draws an abstract piece of art, which everyone else sees as a "naked lady", leading to a cause célèbre; Moze tries photography and captures photos of other people's personal moments; Cookie gets 6th graders to make him keybowls. Ned finds a pair of Carmelo Anthony signed sneakers in the lost and found that he wants to claim, but Moze tries to find the shoes' real owner; Moze tries to find her stuffed animal that she lost in sixth grade; Cookie tries to find his MP3 player which has an embarrassing song he recorded on it.
40	7	"Social Studies & Embarrassment"	Joe Menendez	Scott Fellows & Frank Berin	November 12, 2006	306
Ned becomes project partners with Moze, who becomes jealous when he begins spending too much time with Suzie; Cookie is stuck with Evelyn Kwong as a social studies partner. Ned is subject to forms of embarrassment such as tooting, burping, and the water fountain squirting on his pants; Moze tries to talk to a foreign student, Faymen, but ends up embarrassing herself; Cookie constantly gets pantsed.
41	8	"The Bus & Bad Hair Days"	Savage Steve Holland	Rick Groel & Cynthia True	November 26, 2006	307
Ned tries to get to school early so he can get rid of a note he wrote to Suzie that says "I love you", but the bus driver is distressed over his own recent break-up; Moze tries to get a seat next to Faymen on the bus; Cookie must try to get to school after he misses the bus, or rather, the bus misses him. Ned tries to break out of school to get a free haircut; Moze tries to please Faymen with her hair, and ultimately seeks out Missy's help; Cookie tries to get Lisa Zemo to notice his mustache hair.
42	9	"Revenge & School Records"	David Kendall	Lazar Saric & Rick Groel	January 15, 2007	309
Ned becomes "The Revenger" by helping students get revenge on people for other students; Moze deals with a new player on the volleyball team that mysteriously seems bent on revenge; Cookie tries to get revenge on Evelyn Kwong for tricking him on what to study for a pop quiz. Ned tries to erase his permanent record by doing good after he runs Crubbs over with a mop bucket; Moze tries to set the most school records, even if it means joining the boys' wrestling team; Cookie tries to prove to Sweeney that he really was present during morning roll call in order to maintain his perfect attendance record.
43	10	"The Library & Volunteering"	Savage Steve Holland	Frank Berin & Lazar Saric	January 27, 2007	313
Ned and Cookie must solve the mystery of their missing library books; Moze "befriends" a girl in order to get a book she needs for a book report. Ned volunteers at a nursing home and shows an old lady around Polk; Moze volunteers to clean up the school back entrance with the help of Loomer, Crony and Buzz; Cookie competes with Evelyn Kwong in the school store.
44	11	"Hallways & Friends Moving"	Dan Coffie	Adam Beechen & Scott Fellows	February 3, 2007	310
Ned becomes the hall monitor and lets people in violation get off the hook, which leads the students believing that they can get away with anything in the halls; Moze tries to use hallway time to talk to Faymen; Cookie becomes the hallway traffic reporter. Ned becomes concerned for his safety after the events of the previous episode, so he starts carrying around a pillow, or a "cushion protector" as he calls it; Moze tries to stop Faymen from leaving; Cookie tells Evelyn Kwong he is leaving for Hawaii, so everyone becomes convinced he is leaving; Suzie moves away, much to Ned's surprise and disappointment.
45	12	"Boys & Girls"	Chip Hurd	Frank Berin & Rick Groel	February 10, 2007	311
Ned becomes depressed after Suzie leaves Polk, and quits doing the Guide, so the boys try to cheer him up; Moze teaches the girls how to interact with boys. Ned looks for a girl to take his mind off of Suzie; Cookie dresses as a girl named Simone to find out what Lisa Zemo likes, but Loomer falls in love with Simone.
46	13	"Cell Phones & Woodshop"	David Kendall	Scott Fellows & Rick Groel	February 17, 2007	312
Ned tries to talk with Suzie on their cell phones, but he runs into difficulties; Moze must figure out how to use her new, complicated cell phone; Cookie tries to win a convertible by calling into the radio. After accidentally blowing up the art room, Ned and Cookie must take woodshop; Ned thinks that Moze is in love with him when she is really preparing a rocking chair for a woodworking contest; Cookie is convinced that an electric saw is possessed.
47	14	"Getting Organized & Extra Credit"	Dan Coffie	Scott Fellows & Eddie Guzelian	February 24, 2007	314
Ned's disorganization causes his life to fall apart; Moze and Cookie get the students organized in order to put their favorite snack back in the vending machines after Crubbs replaces it with something he wants. Ned must do an extra credit project for four classes at once in order to save his grades; Moze goes overboard with her extra credit volcano project; Cookie gets his own credit card, but starts becoming too dependent on it.
48	15	"Fundraising & Competition"	Fred Savage	Rick Groel & Lazar Saric	March 10, 2007	315
Ned and Cookie must raise money in different ways after they eat all of the chocolate they were supposed to sell for school fundraising; Moze cannot seem to sell her last chocolate bar. Ned teams up with Missy to battle Loomer in a Social Studies competition; Moze must find a new rival now that Suzie has moved away; Cookie fakes his way to become Lisa's salsa dance partner for a dance competition.
49	16	"Making New Friends & Positives and Negatives"	Savage Steve Holland	Scott Fellows & Rick Groel	March 24, 2007 April 7, 2007	316
Ned is forced by Moze to make friends with Faymen; Moze tries to make a new girl friend; Cookie befriends the Weasel, much to Gordy's disapproval. Ned tries to brighten up the most negative kid at Polk; Moze tries to make sparks fly when she kisses Faymen, but she can't feel anything; Cookie becomes victim to Loomer's new knowledge of static electricity.
50	17	"Money & Parties"	Marcus Wagner	Scott Fellows & Eddie Guzelian	March 24, 2007 April 7, 2007	317
The trio need to raise money for a music festival; Ned borrows money from Missy that he must work off to pay her back; Moze gets her money from hard work; Cookie tries to get money from entertainment. Ned goes to Seth's party with Missy and tries to ditch her when Suzie unexpectedly shows up; Moze tries to kiss Ned to determine if she'll see sparks; Cookie is not invited, so he sneaks in as the girl named Simone.
51	18	"Spring Fever & School Newspaper"	David Kendall	Lazar Saric & Ron Holsey	May 5, 2007	318
The school has spring fever, but Crubbs has the building on lockdown; Ned must find a way outside and avoid the affections of Missy, who is intent on kissing him; Moze still feels nothing when she kisses Faymen; Cookie must deal with Lisa Zemo after her allergies kick in and she reverts to being unattractive. The trio join the school newspaper; Ned and Moze cover a controversial story regarding $20,000 missing from the maintenance budget; Cookie becomes the horoscope writer, which he uses to his advantage.
52	19	"Health & Jealousy"	Lazar Saric	Rick Groel & Eddie Guzelian	May 12, 2007	319
Ned suffers from an embarrassing itch; Moze tries to clean up the resuscitation dummy, but she throws it out the window and buries it, and Cookie thinks that it was Faymen; Cookie also is suffering from mood swings. Ned and Moze pretend to date to free Ned from Missy's jealous rage; Seth, Faymen and Loomer fight over Moze; Cookie attempts to make Lisa Zemo jealous by pretending to go out with another girl, but instead, it makes Evelyn Kwong jealous.
53	20	"Tests & When You Like Someone Who Is Going Out With Someone Else"	Gary Stella	Lazar Saric & Scott Fellows	June 2, 2007	320
Ned studies for three tests on the same day with the help of the school's geeks and becomes a geek himself in the process; Moze takes a test to see if Ned or Faymen is right for her and Faymen gets all perfect scores and Ned as a geek gets all zeroes; Cookie gives Evelyn Kwong a "test" to prove that they are incompatible and she decides to date Seth instead. Ned tries to confess to Moze that he likes her; Moze must decide between Ned and Faymen, while Faymen has a decide whether or not to go back to Brazil; Cookie eliminates all of Lisa Zemo's other admirers so that he can spend time with her; in a surprise ending reveal, Suzie has moved back to Polk.
54	21	"Field Trips, Permission Slips, Signs & Weasels"	Savage Steve Holland	Scott Fellows & Lazar Saric	June 8, 2007	321–322
The school goes on a field trip to a museum, including Ned, Moze and Cookie, even after they have been banned from the field trip by Vice-Principal Crubbs for trying to forge a permission slip for Cookie; Ned tries to spend time with Suzie while avoiding Crubbs; Moze tries to see the wild boy, and Loomer tries to spend time with her; Cookie becomes "the Steel Eagle" to impress Lisa Zemo. Eventually, all three are chased by Crubbs, museum security guards, and samurai actors; Ned inadvertently becomes the museum's titular Wild Boy and must choose between Suzie and Moze. He chooses Moze, they kiss, and become boyfriend and girlfriend, while Suzie decides to date Loomer again; Cookie learns of a plan to steal the museum's Wild Boy painting, so the trio gain the attention of the security guards and catch the thieves; As a result of their heroism, Crubbs unbans them from the trip and Cookie wins a date with Lisa. Meanwhile, back at the school, Gordy tries to catch the weasel with the help of the other teachers, whose items have been destroyed by the weasel. They eventually demolish the entire school to catch the weasel, only to find out that it has given birth; feeling sympathetic, Gordy and the teachers decide to spare the weasel. Note: This is a double-length episode.
