= List of Ned's Declassified School Survival Guide characters =

Ned's Declassified School Survival Guide is an American comedy television series created by Scott Fellows for Nickelodeon, which ran from September 12, 2004, to June 8, 2007.

== Main ==
Actor	Character	Season		
Actor	Character	1	2	3
Devon Werkheiser	Ned Bigby	Main	Main	Main
Lindsey Shaw	Jennifer "Moze" Mosely	Main	Main	Main
Daniel Curtis Lee	Simon "Cookie" Nelson-Cook	Main	Main	Main
Daran Norris	Gordy	Recurring	Main	Main
Jim J. Bullock	Mr. Monroe	Main	Recurring	Recurring

=== Ned Bigby ===
Ned Bigby (played by Devon Werkheiser) is the titular main protagonist, who speaks to the viewer and created his school survival guide after being embarrassed when accidentally walking into the girls' bathroom in kindergarten. He often gets into trouble along with his closest friends Moze and Cookie. Ned is a smart kid, but he is also very lazy. Most of the time he scores below average, although he is perfectly capable of getting straight A's when he works seriously. He usually tries to find the easiest way to solve any personal problem, even if it is not necessarily the moral or logical way. Because of this, his plans sometimes backfire, but it teaches him lessons that he includes in the guide. Since he was eight years old, his dream girl has been Suzie Crabgrass. In the series finale, he and Moze start dating. He usually turns to Gordy, the school's janitor, for advice.

=== Jennifer "Moze" Mosely ===
Jennifer Ann Mosely (played by Lindsey Shaw) is Ned and Cookie's tomboyish best friend. Jennifer goes by the name of "Moze", a nickname created by Ned to differentiate from the other three "Jennifers" in their first grade class. In the first season, a recurring theme is her trying to break away from Ned and Cookie in the hope of finding a girl to be friends with. She eventually becomes best friends with former enemy Suzie Crabgrass. Moze is a volleyball player, has set the most school records, including one for the most school records, and shows exceptional talent in woodshop. She is the one Ned and Cookie typically come to for favors. She is a very good student, who most teachers trust. In "Double Dating and The Last of Day of School", she kisses Ned at a dance and a romance is hinted at. In the finale, they begin dating.

=== Simon "Cookie" Nelson-Cook ===
Simon Nelson-Cook (played by Daniel Curtis Lee) is Ned's other best friend who goes by the nickname "Cookie". He is a cybernerd who often uses his extensive technological knowledge to help himself and his friends. He has a motherboard in his locker, his pants double as a printer and his glasses are a computer display. Occasionally, Cookie takes on a female persona named Simone, usually in order to obtain information or get into parties. This disguise fools everyone save for Ned and Moze, because they knew about it beforehand. Cookie becomes infatuated with Lisa Zemo in season 3 after she undergoes a complete makeover. In the finale, Cookie, after countless attempts to ask her out, finally succeeds.

=== Gordy ===
Gordy (played by Daran Norris; recurring, season 1; main, seasons 2–3) is Polk's lazy and incompetent daytime janitor and a former Polk student. While he often assists Ned, Moze and Cookie with their various schemes, he's obsessed with capturing a weasel living in the school. More often than not, he'll dismiss any actual work for the night janitor. He was once a dance instructor in the past, and went to law school three times. In Episode 20 of the Neds Declassified Podcast, creator Scott Fellows reveals that he and Daran Norris had created a backstory for Gordy, that he was a trust-fund baby who couldn’t hold down a job and was obsessed with playing golf. His father told Gordy he would lose access to the trust fund if he didnt have a job. Therefore Gordy got his janitorial position at Polk Middle School, ten minutes from the nearest golf course, to appease his father while still living a relatively carefree lifestyle as the kooky janitor.

=== Mr. Monroe ===
Mr. Monroe (played by Jim J. Bullock; main, season 1; recurring, seasons 2–3) is the Life Science teacher, as well as overseer of the Sewing Club and the boys' basketball team. Monroe appears primarily in the first season. He returns in "School Newspaper", saying that he was "living with the penguins" for a year, and only recurs in seasons 2 and 3.

== Supporting ==
=== The Weasel ===
The Weasel is a weasel (actually a ferret) that runs around the school since the series began due to an untidy student's locker, hinting that the weasel may have been that student's pet. Gordy wants to capture this weasel and has used numerous traps in the series and failed. In one episode, Gordy successfully captures the weasel, but after finding a robot that heads straight towards it, Gordy shows remorse and releases the weasel (and ends up being harmed by the robot). In "Elections," the weasel was elected Class President. In the episode "Recycling," the weasel wins the school's recycling contest after stealing the reusable materials collected by everyone else to use for a nest, including Ned's Guide. The weasel and Gordy end up having a liking to each other at the end of the series, especially since, in the series finale, it is shown that the weasel is actually a female when she is shown nursing new weasel pups.

=== Students ===
==== Suzie Crabgrass ====
Suzie Crabgrass (Christian Serratos) is Ned's longtime crush and Moze's rival at every sport and club, but she becomes her best friend. Having ended up dating Billy Loomer for a short time at the beginning of season 2, in season 3 she begins to develop a crush on Ned, and they start dating in the episode "Popularity & Stressin' Out". She leaves temporarily in the third season episode "Hallways & Friends Moving" but comes back in "Tests & When You Like Someone That is Going Out with Someone Else". She was Ned's dream girl since she was eight. In the series finale, she hopes at first that she and Ned will be together, but then decides to date Loomer after seeing his change and because Ned started to like Moze instead.

==== Billy Loomer ====
Billy Loomer, usually referred to simply as Loomer, (Kyle Swann), is the leader of a trio of bullies at Polk Middle School and he is the main antagonist of the show. Billy and his bully friends love picking on kids all throughout the school, especially Ned (Whose Loomer's favorite nerd), Cookie, and Coconut-Head, and he hates the Killer Bees and the Huge Crew. For much of the series, he is dating Suzie Crabgrass, but he wants to break up with her so he can date Moze. He also has a crush on Cookie's alter ego Simone and is impressed by her knowledge of sports and automotive mechanics. At the end of the series, he changes from a violent bully into a kind, respectable, well-mannered young man. His name is a parody of Billy Loomis from the film Scream.

==== Jerry Crony ====
Jerry Crony (Teo Olivares) is one of Billy Loomer's best friends, who aids him in his bullying, with a penchant for fashion design that he tries to deny whenever he is seen in the school's sewing club. He is usually very nice and well-behaved when he is not around Loomer. He tries to ask Missy Meany out a few times over the course of the series but always fails due to his messy hair and clothes.

==== Buzz Rodriguez ====
Buzz Rodriguez (Recci Canon) is one of Loomer's friends. He almost never speaks; Loomer even states that he has never spoken the entire time they have known each other. He talks for the first time in the episode "The Library and Volunteering", stating that the reason he had never spoken before was that everything up until that point had been fine, so he felt no need to talk.

==== Missy Meany ====
Missy Meany (Carlie Casey) is a pretty, very popular school cheerleader. She turns out to be a nasty, conceited person who cheats at almost anything and will stop at nothing to get her way. Starting in season 3, she develops an obsessive crush on Ned. After finding out that Ned will not return her feelings for him, she goes out with Jerry Crony in the finale. She also has two very tall bodyguards, who she cheerfully calls her collection team or more commonly, her "Missy Buddies." In "School Clubs" she rips off Ned's school survival guide with a club called the Missy's Declassified School Survival Manual Club, writing "Helpful Hints", which are really terrible ways to survive school and become popular.

==== Coconut Head ====
Coconut Head (Rob Pinkston) is an often-ridiculed dorky friend of Ned, Moze, and Cookie, and a common bullying-target of Billy Loomer's violent gang. His real name is never revealed. His nickname is based on his hairdo, which looks like a coconut. As revealed in “Dodgeball”, he gets chronic nose bleeds, and has been getting them ever since he was three, which is no big deal. In multiple episodes it is shown that he is a talented free throw shooter at basketball. It is revealed that he has an operatic singing voice in the episode "Electives". In the episode "Valentine's Day," he is in love with the Huge Crew.

==== Martin Qwerly ====
Martin Qwerly (Tylor Chase) is another geeky friend of Ned, Cookie, and Moze. He is extremely optimistic and is always seen talking, usually insanely fast. People usually cover his mouth during his fast-talks or put up a cardboard cutout of themselves next to him and leave. He is the class vice-president. In the episode "Video Projects" he pretends to be a ninja and is caught on video, causing him to become a laughingstock until Ned and Cookie add special effects and voiceover narration into the video, making him popular. His name is a pun of the phrase "smart and squirrelly" as seen in the episode "Project Partners."

==== Claire Sawyer ====
Claire Sawyer (Brooke Marie Bridges) is a student at Polk who aspires to be a future lawyer. She often introduces herself by saying, "Claire Sawyer, future lawyer." Usually when she introduces herself in this manner to one of the three main characters, most commonly in season 1, they remind her that they have all known her since pre-kindergarten. She is always seen wearing a business suit. She appears when one of the characters needed consulting or if they needed help with something that seems like a legal issue. Her leitmotif parodies the first few notes of Symphony No. 5 by Ludwig van Beethoven.

==== Lisa Zemo ====
Lisa Zemo (Rachel Sibner) is a geeky and good-natured friend of Ned, Cookie, and Moze who undergoes a complete makeover in season 3 of the show. She is allergic to many things, including cats, dogs, trees, nuts, and rap videos that exploit women. Because of her chronic allergies in seasons 1 and 2, she is almost always seen carrying a bottle of nasal spray. She had a crush on Cookie, who finds her creepy before her makeover but vies for her attention after it, competing with several boys. She temporarily reverts to her old self in "Spring Fever". She is the class treasurer.

==== The Huge Crew ====
The Huge Crew, a girl clique of bullies in the school, is led by Doris Trembley (Jennifer Tedmori), along with Katie (Cathy Immordino) and Lakisha (Jherimi Carter). They dislike Billy Loomer and his friends, and they are obsessed with Ned.

==== Backpack Boy ====
Backpack Boy (Kendre Berry) is a student who carries an oversized backpack including many various things. He has a crush on Claire Sawyer. His backpack includes various items such as computers, Ethernet cables, power supplies, wires, school items, and any other obscure item else one might need while surviving middle school.

==== Chandra Taylor ====
Chandra Taylor (Marquise Brown) is a nice girl who is often seen with friends Ned, Moze, Cookie, Martin, Coconut Head, and Lisa. She is often in the background sitting at their lunch table or talking in class. She is impressed with shiny mirrors, seeing "heaven". She takes a good photo in "Photo Day." She is the first person to be recruited to the new cool talent show. She hosts a party in "Emergency Drills". She likes to share, sharing her cream corn with friends. She asked Ned to distribute 400 flyers in "Bad Habits". She's last seen in "Reading" as part of Moze's book club.

==== Bitsy Johnson ====
Bitsy Johnson (Spencer Locke) is a mean, popular girl, seen only in season 1, who cheats to get high grades and academic awards at school, Moze being her main victim, as revealed on the episode "Cheaters and Bullies". She also tries to humiliate Moze by stealing her diary, and in the episode "Notes" she gets Ned in trouble for passing notes. Her character was replaced by Missy. She is best friends with Suzie Crabgrass.

==== Seth Powers ====
Seth Powers (Alex Black) is a basketball player at Polk. He is shown in many episodes to be dumb and bad at rhyming, and is constantly seen spinning a basketball on his finger. In some earlier episodes, Moze is seen to have romantic interest in him, even going out with him several times. In the episode "Secrets", he reveals to Moze that he cannot read well, possibly due to dyslexia. Moze gets over him in season 3, but afterwards he starts to show romantic feelings towards her instead.

==== Spencer ====
Spencer (Corbin Bleu) is a student in the drama club who is obsessed with theatre. He speaks with a projected theatrical voice and dreams of being a Hollywood star. In the episode "School Plays", Spencer and Suzie play the lead roles in Romeo and Juliet, and Spencer makes Ned jealous by saying that the big kiss will win Suzie over leading to Ned destroying the play and Spencer getting injured in the mayhem. In another episode, "Revenge", Backpack Boy gets revenge on Spencer for stealing his crush, Claire Sawyer.

==== Faymen Porchin ====
Faymen Porchin (Vinicius Machado) is Moze's crush and later boyfriend in the third season until the episode "When You Like Someone Who is Going Out with Someone Else", in which he leaves to play professional soccer in Brazil. His name is a play on the phrase "fame and fortune." When he kisses Moze, Moze feels nothing and says there is no spark, unlike Moze's kiss with Ned. However, after practicing, he was able to get her attention. In "Bus and Bad Hair Days" the foreign language teacher talks to Faymen in Portuguese, learning that he misses his home in Brazil. His favorite food is steak, which he likes medium rare.

==== Evelyn Kwong ====
Evelyn Kwong (Michelle Kim) is a studious and smart person who likes competition within her courses. At first, she had a bitter rivalry with Cookie and tended to despise him, but becomes initially interested in him after they accidentally kiss. She soon became madly in love with Cookie and seemed to torment him constantly, both competing against him to be the smartest student at Polk, and obsessively pursuing his affections. Evelyn finally stopped harassing Cookie and started dating Seth (who miraculously became smarter after spending time with her) in the episode "Tests". She was also part of an organization squad to help Ned get organized in the episode "Getting Organized." In the episode, "When You Like Someone Who's Going Out with Someone Else," she begins going out with Seth Powers. She tends to use intimidation to fulfill her goals.

==== The Scoop ====
The Scoop (Vincent Martella) is the school's Jersey-accented journalist and photographer. He tends to be quite annoying and assertive, which especially annoys Moze. He often dresses like he’s a 1940's news reporter, and carries around a camera. Scoop appears only in two episodes of the first season and one episode of the second season.

==== The Killer Bees ====
The Killer Bees are a group of three spelling bee addicted bullies, known as King Bee (Carlos Pena), Queen Bee (Krystal Acosta), and Stinger (Sean Michael Afable). They always dress in yellow and black, and tend to quickly spell-out insults at people. Their only appearances were "Spelling Bees" and "Best Friends". They always seemed to have an aversion towards Cookie because he was also good at spelling. Later on in the series, they ask Cookie to be part of their group, but this was only so they could have their math grades changed.

==== Mike Grudzielanek ====
Mike Grudzielanek (Joseph Ruzer) is a student who is a jock and in the choir who is first seen in season 2. In "Upperclassmen", he and his friends (except Jock Goldman) beat up Ned throughout most of the episode for falsely spraying soda in their faces, taking away their pants and stepping on the wolf logo when it was actually Palmer Noid who harassed them. It is implied that he might play basketball and football, and he is best friends with Seth and Paul. It is also implied that he got left back a year because he is seen with Jock Goldman and when Ned, Moze and Cookie reach the eighth grade, he is still seen in middle school.

==== Doug Secksay ====
Doug Secksay (Paul Diaz) is a seemingly popular male student, who always goes surrounded by girls who like him. His face is unseen, since the girls cover him completely. When the girls abandon him for Cookie, he is only seen from the back. He seems to be of Latin origins, although in the first season he had a surfer dude accent. His last name is a pun on the word "Sexy".

==== Palmer Noid ====
Palmer Noid (Cameron Monaghan) is a pesky redheaded fifth grader who later becomes a student in season 3. He is commonly known as the "kid who takes pants." His last name is both a reference and an allusion to The Noid mascot from Domino's Pizza.

==== Albert Wormenheimer ====
Albert Wormenheimer (Stephen Markarian) is a geeky, math-loving student with a habit of picking his nose and talking to his "inner voice" in a dramatic manner. He created the popularity list for Polk in Season 3. He was part of an organization squad to help Ned get organized. He taught him how to empty out clutter in his locker and use a calendar. He was in love with a new kid named Bernice, because she also had the same round glasses, enjoyed math and picking her nose, and talked to herself. His nickname is "The Worminator."

==== Stu ====
Stu (Landon Taylor) is one of Cookie's and Ned's friends. He is shown to wear glasses, have a bad habit of biting his finger nails, and somewhat be a little geeky like Albert. He attends Cookie's confidence class in "Shyness" and tries to ask Chandra out in "Asking Someone Out".

==== Vanessa ====
Vanessa (Logan Browning) is a student who was Cookie's girlfriend in season 2. She doesn't appear in season 3 because she split up with Cookie and went to high school. Cookie brought Lisa Zemo to a dance along with Vanessa.

==== Lance Widget ====
Lance Widget (Adam Cagley) is a heavyset nerdy bully who is also smarter than Ned, Cookie and Moze. He tends to be very loud and overbearing, shouting at people, calling nearly everyone a "moron," and constantly reminding people that his last name is pronounced "wid-jay". He was part of the organization squad to help Ned in the episode "Getting Organized", with his organization specialty being school gear. He also carries around a fanny pack everywhere.

==== Jock Goldman ====
Jock Goldman (Ben Hogestyn) is an upperclassman jock who used Moze to get back with his ex-girlfriend Amy Cassidy. After they broke up again, he begins to like Moze in season 2. In the episode, "Double-Dating," he asks Moze to a dance. To see if he truly likes her, Ned, Cookie and Gordy put Jock through a lie-detector test. Jock truthfully states he no longer has feelings for Amy Cassidy and likes Moze, prompting Moze to agree to go out with him. However, at the dance, Jock sees Ned accidentally kiss Moze, believing she was Suzie, and leaves her so Ned and Moze can be together. In the aforementioned lie-detector test, Jock also reluctantly admitted to Ned, Moze, Cookie and Gordy that he once got the runs after eating bad roast beef.

==== Stacy and Tracy Oboe ====
Stacy and Tracy Oboe (Alex and Addison Hoover) are smart, nerdy twin sisters who both play the oboe. They are both extremely shy; they would never talk to anyone but each other, and were afraid to be apart. In the episode "'Shyness," Ned and Moze tried to help the twins overcome their shyness, though Tracy did so by copying another person almost exactly.

==== Psycho Jones ====
Psycho Jones (Ernie Sloman) is a menacing student who looks like a psycho. He appeared in "Shyness" and "Nicknames." Ned nicknamed himself Psycho, not knowing there was already a student with that nickname in the school, which angers the real Psycho.

==== Timmy Toot-Toot ====
Timmy Toot-Toot (Kelii Miyata) is a student of James K. Polk Middle School who is notorious for his dangerously powerful and frequent farts, preceded by him saying "toot toot!" Despite this embarrassing habit, Timmy takes pride in his "tooting" ability, calling it a "superpower." He said it allows him to do certain things, such as sitting anywhere in the movies. He also became angered and felt that Ned was trying to compete with him when Ned accidentally farted in class in the episode "Embarrassment." In "Tutors," Cookie uses him in a project to power a lawn mower by using his farts after eating beans, but things go wrong and an explosion causes his stench to spread throughout the school, making everyone flee in terror.

==== Nelson Duckworth ====
Nelson Duckworth (Colby O'Donis) is a student at Polk Middle School. He only appeared in "Nicknames". Cookie gave him the nickname "Quack". Later, Cookie gave him the nickname "Mr. Duckworth."

==== Allan Alby ====
Allan Alby (Jesse Heiman) is a bespectacled and ruddy student at Polk Middle School. He is usually seen in most of Ned's classes. His only spoken line in the series is an excited "yeah!" when he is asked to use the CPR dummy.

==== Martha Qwerly ====
Martha Qwerly (Serena Berman) is an overly talkative student who is Martin's sister. She only appeared in "Tutors," where Ned put a cardboard cutout of himself and leaves when she talks too much. She talks as often and fast as Martin. She also says that there are numerous Qwerlys.

==== One Bite ====
One Bite (Woorie Chung) is the nickname given to a student who is notorious for asking for "just one bite" of someone's meal at lunch then proceeding to eat half of the meal in a single bite.

==== May, June and Julie ====
May (Amanda Alch), June (Meghan N. Shaw), and Julie (Kelly Vitz) are a group of girls who wear dresses and like to have tea parties during lunch. Moze first thinks they are robots because they act synchronously and avoid water. Also, June has twitches, Julie carries lots of electronic parts in her bag back, and Moze witnesses May take off her arm prosthesis.

==== Bernice ====
Bernice (Tristin Mays) is a new student at Polk Middle School. She had previously been to three different schools, where she always changed her identity from a cheerleader to a goth girl. When she comes to Polk, she pretends to be a tough girl, but after spending time with the Huge Crew, she reveals herself to be a geeky math loving brainiac. She then starts hanging out with Albert Wormenheimer.

=== Faculty/Staff ===
==== Mr. Sweeney ====
Mr. Sweeney (Don Creech) is a science teacher at Polk. Many of the students, especially Ned, think he is evil. He is often seen as the show's antagonist. He seems to have a large disliking for Ned due to his lazy nature but obvious intelligence. In the series finale, as an "early graduation present," he helps Ned when Ned is trying to hide from Vice Principal Crubbs. After Crubbs leaves, Mr. Sweeney says to Ned that Ned will be remembered as one of his worst students, but also as one of his favorites. He is always seen wearing a white lab coat.

==== Vice Principal Harvey Crubbs ====
Vice Principal Harvey Crubbs (Hamilton Mitchell) is the vice principal, an exaggerated spoof of Miami Vice. The name "Crubbs" is an amalgam of the two main Miami Vice characters, "Crockett" and "Tubbs." Crubbs is always keeping an eye on Ned. He is obsessed with flamingos, mini powdered donuts, and sunglasses. He states to Ned in "Career Day" that he did not want to be a vice-principal as a teenager, but actually wanted to be a vice-cop in Miami. He took the job as vice-principal as a way to help the kids at school stop themselves from getting to bad places, and because it still has vice in the title. He is one of the show's main antagonists (along with Mr. Sweeney). He has three catchphrases. One is "Crubbs out!", which he says when he leaves. He is also known to tell people "you're fired!," usually said to Gordy, although he never actually means it. A third is when he tells people that he will be watching them "like this," followed by putting his sunglasses on in various ways. In one episode, when vying for the position of principal, he tricks all the people looking to interview for the position and locks them in a room, until Principal Pal knocks him out and puts him in the trap room. Principal Wright becomes principal. In "Lost and Found," he is discovered to steal things from the lost and found and put them in a special room to keep, including Moze's "puppy bear" she lost when she was young and Cookie's MP3 that contains a recording of his "Cowboy Cookie" song.

==== Principal Pal ====
Principal Pal (John Bliss) is the senile former principal of James K. Polk Middle School who appears only in the third season. He becomes the new social studies teacher when Ms. Knapp retires. He once had a dream to go roller-blading in Africa, which he wanted to do when he quit. It is revealed in "Halloween" that he has no pulse because of a plate in his chest that makes it impossible for his heartbeat to be heard; these two items are what he used to convince Ned and his friends that he was dead to scare them.

==== Principal Alistar Wright ====
Principal Alistar Wright (Meshach Taylor) is a Social Studies teacher at Polk who favors Moze as one of his best students. He later becomes the principal in season 3. He is also the school's cross country coach. He has a doctorate degree from Harvard University.

==== Dr. Xavier ====
Dr. Xavier (Lusia Strus) is the Russian-accented 8th grade math teacher. She is a self-proclaimed "super-genius" who tends to be quite strict and almost maniacal. She is always seen wearing a drab gray smock, and at one point requires all her students to dress the same way. Her students, including Cookie, seem to fear her in the "Math" episode due to her overly harsh attitude, but when Cookie suggests that math class should be more fun, she changes her rigorous ways and becomes friendlier to her students. She loves romance novels. She has a crush on Gordy, who she refers to as "handsome cleaning man," and is shown to want to date him despite Gordy not reciprocating. In one episode, she was revealed to have won bronze medals in Greco-Roman Wrestling and Luge, and is shown on a cereal box with a hammer and sickle on it. In "The Bus," she rides a bike to school in order to stay in shape; at the end of the episode, she accepts Mr. Kwest's proposal to go on a date.

==== Dr. Lowe ====
Dr. Lowe (Fred Stoller) is a quirky character that does two jobs at Polk. He is seen as a study hall adviser and sometimes seen as the school's psychiatrist. He also seems to be the school bus driver in the episode "The Late Bus."

==== Coach Joy Dirga ====
Coach Joy Dirga (Kim Sava) is a tough and aggressive female coach and gym teacher who is often seen shouting harshly at her students. Despite her aggressive nature and tendency to act like a drill sergeant, she has a caring and encouraging side. In "Your Body", she states that her current height is the same height she was in the seventh grade. She enjoys Star Wars and soap operas.

==== Dusty Chopsaw ====
Dusty Chopsaw (Dave Florek) is the school woodshop teacher. He has an unnatural obsession with woodworking and sometimes acts like he is "attracted" to the shop tools. He favors Moze as his best student and helps her through confusing times by giving her advice such as finding a talent for Ned's talent show and her feelings for Ned. He could immediately tell that there was something more between Ned and Moze. He was also the very first teacher seen on the show. He was in the season 1 theme song.

==== Mr. Combover ====
Mr. Combover (Steve Bannos) is the choir and music appreciation teacher. He also runs the school plays. He is known for liking the arts and classical music artists like Mozart and Beethoven, as well as having an unusual combover and facial hair that encircles his face, leaving the rest of his head behind it shaved. He is also a high school music teacher in the mornings.

==== iTeacher ====
iTeacher (Mo Collins) is a teacher at Polk. She "home teaches" by using a computer and chat server to interact with her students and has another student push the computer around when she wants to talk directly to someone in the hallways. She has self-esteem issues in some episodes, and is sometimes angered because she is (as she says, referring to the computer) "stuck in a box!"

==== Mr. Kwest ====
Mr. Kwest (Dave "Gruber" Allen) runs the computer lab, though he knows nothing about computers. He also runs a fantasy war game club and drives the bus. His girlfriend apparently broke up with him in "The Bus" and he was very distraught as a result; at the end of the episode, he asks Dr. Xavier if she would like to go on a date and she accepts.

==== Rose ====
Rose (Loni Love) is a lunch lady who can see the future in the beans, peas or corn. Her predictions always come true but not in the expected ways. One prediction she gave was that Ned would kiss the love of his life at the dance, which actually happened to be Moze and not Suzie. She can at times be very obnoxious. In "Electives" she taught a cooking class, where she chided the students who thought cooking would be easy and that it actually takes time and effort.

==== Mr. Gross ====
Mr. Gross (Steve Bannos) is a teacher with bad hygienic habits, which makes him smell bad. He was seen only two times in the first season.

==== Nurse Hunsucker ====
Nurse Hunsucker (Mary Bogue) is the disgruntled school nurse who grudgingly helps the sick students. She often has a sour attitude. In "Sick Days," her suspicions of Cookie having the flu had her trying to hunt him down and send him home, to no avail; she also prevented Ned from meeting Mat Hoffman after mistaking him for having a high fever. Moze has her number on speed dial.

==== Mr. Dren ====
Mr. Dren (Charles Chun) is a student Math Teacher in episode "Teachers" and "Math" from seasons 1 and 2. At first, he is treated very poorly by the students, besides Moze, and decides with Moze's help to scare the other students into listening to him. His name is Nerd backwards.

==== Mr. Adam ====
Mr. Adam (Adam Conway) is a familiar face around the school. He is a teacher who occurs frequently throughout the series. He mostly serves as a study hall teacher, although he appears as a substitute teacher in the episode "Substitute Teachers." When the students try to give him long explanations, he looks at them as if he doesn't care. He appears to be more laid back, if not the most laid back faculty member at Polk. He is usually always seen along with a big group of other faculty members.

==== Miss Knapp ====
Miss Knapp (Ellen Albertini Dow) is the elderly social studies teacher who always likes to sleep, as her name implies. Her replacement is Mr. Pal, the school's former principal.

==== Nigel Hattorff ====
Nigel Hattorff (Nolan North) is the German-accented art teacher who has a hairstyle similar to that of Coconut Head. He is based on Andy Warhol.

==== Mr. Weiner ====
Mr. Weiner (Marc Weiner) is a substitute teacher who used to be Ned, Moze and Cookie's elementary school substitute. He has saved Ned from the girls' bathroom three times. He tries bringing his little grade school skits with him (including a large walrus with help from Ned) to Polk to make his students laugh. He is seen only in "Substitute Teachers".

==== Miss Splitz ====
Miss Splitz (Melissa Peterman) is a school counselor in Polk who spied on Ned when he did not get good grades. She speaks like R. Lee Ermey to Ned. She talks and looks nice to Cookie. She uses different methods for counselling each student, which tends to make her seem like she has a split personality (her last name being an obvious pun of this). Despite her unorthodox methods, she genuine cares for the students and wants them to succeed in their education.

==== Mr. Gibson ====
Mr. Gibson (Art Alexakis) is a music teacher who appeared in "Music Class," his name is a reference to Gibson guitars. The song "Rock Star" by Everclear (the band that Alexakis is the lead singer of) was also featured in this episode.

==== Mrs. Holler ====
Mrs. Holler (Judy Tenuta) is the school librarian who appeared in "The Library". She is very loud, plays the accordion and has a bad singing voice.
