= Shredderman Rules =

- DVD cover
- Based on: Shredderman by Wendelin Van Draanen
- Written by: Russell Marcus
- Directed by: Savage Steve Holland
- Starring: Devon Werkheiser; Daniel Roebuck; Andrew Caldwell; Tim Meadows; Dave Coulier; Mindy Sterling; Francia Almendárez; Henry E. Taylor III
- Music by: Paul Doucette
- Country of origin: United States
- Original language: English

Production
- Producers: Lauren Levine; Joel S. Rice; Gerald T. Olson
- Cinematography: William D. Barber
- Editor: Cindy Parisotto
- Running time: 93 minutes
- Production companies: Dolphin Entertainment; WildRice Productions; Nickelodeon Productions

Original release
- Network: Nickelodeon
- Release: June 9, 2007

Shredderman Rules is a 2007 American television teen film based on Wendelin Van Draanen's Shredderman book series. The film stars Devon Werkheiser, and was originally aired on Nickelodeon on June 9, 2007, with the final episode of Ned's Declassified School Survival Guide, which also starred Werkheiser. It is the first movie to be aired under the banner Nickelodeon Original Movie.

== Plot ==
Nolan Byrd, a shy but tech-savvy eighth grader, is assigned a multimedia project by his teacher, Mr. Green. Nolan decides to do an exposé on schoolmate Bubba Bixby, who bullies him and many other students.

Taking the pseudonym "Shredderman" to avoid Bubba's retaliation, Nolan films Bubba bullying other students and uploads the footage to a website, www.shreddermanrules.com, causing Bubba to face discipline from the principal, Dr. Sheila Voss. Nolan later begins filming the school's faculty, including Dr. Voss, and they too are exposed for similarly cruel actions.

Nolan discovers that Bubba's father, Bob, the CEO of a waste management company whom Dr. Voss is close with, is planning to dump sewage in a local pond under the guise of an urban renewal project. Nolan posts the evidence online, and word spreads quickly, inspiring Nolan to sabotage the signing of the deed. Nolan's father, a local journalist, begins investigating the project.

In retaliation, Bob and Bubba attempt to discredit Shredderman by framing him. They steal a guinea pig named Claudette from Nolan's crush, Isabel, but Nolan is able to retrieve her from the pet shop.

On the day of the signing, Nolan manages to expose Bob using a toy boat and two pairs of planes, despite Dr. Voss' attempts to stop him. Bob is arrested and sentenced to community service at the school, while a humiliated Dr. Voss is fired. Nolan's father, after the successful publication of his story, heads to Britain for a bigger story. Shredderman becomes famous, though Nolan continues to conceal his identity and successfully asks Isabel out on a date.

== Cast ==
- Devon Werkheiser as Nolan Byrd/"Shredderman"
  - Cajun Moon Holland as young Nolan
- Tim Meadows as Mr. Green
- Andrew Caldwell as Alvin "Bubba" Bixby
- Daniel Roebuck as Bob Bixby
- Mindy Sterling as Dr. Sheila Voss
- Dave Coulier as Steven Byrd
- Clare Carey as Mrs. Byrd
- Francia Almendárez as Isabel Lopez
  - Sarah Mendez as young Isabel
- Kendré Berry as Max Smith
  - T.J. Burnett as young Max
- Marisa Guterman as "Man-Hands" Miriam
- Curtis Armstrong as Mayor Izzo
- Julianna McCarthy as Grandma
- Henry E. Taylor III as Art the Fart
- Alexandra Krosney as Tina Atkins
- Justin Lee as Todd
- Chad Smathers as Randy

== Soundtrack ==
- Paul Doucette – "Better Days"
- Smash Mouth – "Walkin' on the Sun"

== Home media ==
The film was released on DVD on August 28, 2007, by Sony Pictures Home Entertainment along with The Last Day of Summer.
