= Christian Serratos =

American actress (born 1990)

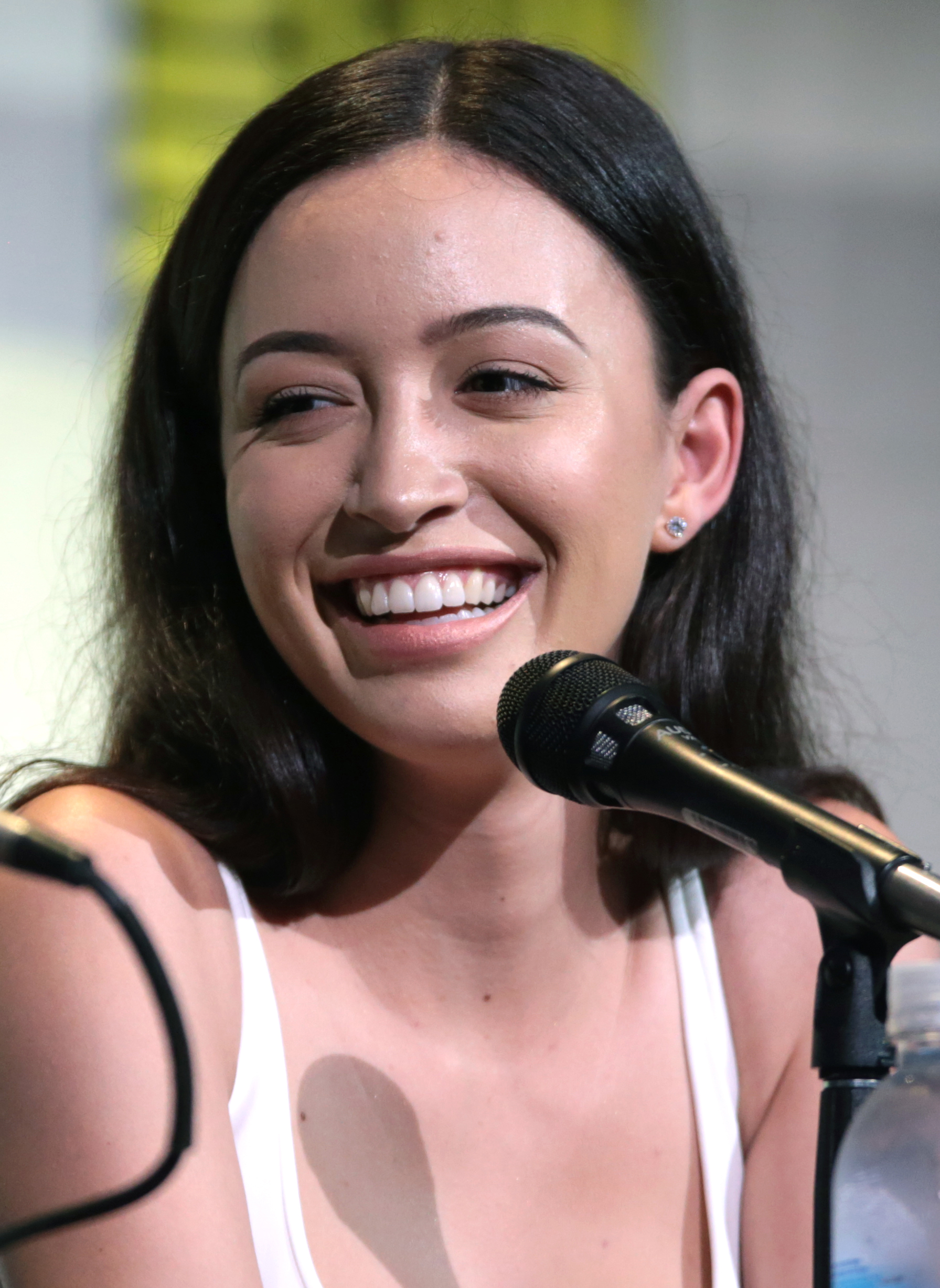
- Serratos in 2016 at San Diego Comic Con
- Born: Christian Marie Bernardi; September 21, 1990 (age 36); Pasadena, California, U.S.
- Occupation: Actress
- Years active: 2004–present
- Known for: Ned's Declassified School Survival Guide as Suzie Crabgrass; The Walking Dead as Rosita Espinosa The Twilight Saga as Angela Weber Selena: The Series as Selena Quintanilla
- Partner: David Boyd (2014–present)
- Children: 1

Christian Marie Serratos (/səˈrɑːtoʊs/ sə-RAH-tohss; née Bernardi; born September 21, 1990) is an American actress, who is best known for portraying Rosita Espinosa in AMC's The Walking Dead TV series, based on the comic book of the same name. She is also known for playing Suzie Crabgrass in the Nickelodeon series Ned's Declassified School Survival Guide and Angela Weber in The Twilight Saga. From 2020 to 2021, she portrayed the "Queen of Tejano" singer Selena in Netflix's Selena: The Series.

== Early life ==
Serratos was born in Pasadena, California, and raised in Burbank, California. Alicia Serratos, her mother, is Mexican, while her father is Italian. She worked as an extra on The Drew Carey Show and Coach.

She began figure skating at age three and continued competitively, saying, "My coaches were talking about the Olympics and it was really crazy. Now, I just do it for fun." At the age of seven, she signed with the Ford Modeling Agency.

== Career ==
Serratos played Suzie Crabgrass in the Nickelodeon series Ned's Declassified School Survival Guide, which debuted in 2004 and ended in 2007 after three seasons.

Serratos's role as Angela Weber in Twilight won her the "Young Supporting Actress" award in the Best Performance in a Feature Film category at the 30th Young Artist Awards. Serratos reprised the role in the sequels The Twilight Saga: New Moon and The Twilight Saga: Eclipse. In 2011, she appeared in The Black Keys' video for their song "Howlin' for You".

Serratos played Rosita Espinosa in AMC's series The Walking Dead, initially as a recurring character in the fourth season where she made her first appearance at the end of the tenth episode "Inmates". Her character was promoted to series regular in the fifth season, and was added to the series' main credits in the seventh season. On September 22, 2022, it was reported that Christian Serratos has been cast in the lead role of the HBO Max drama More playing Londyn Lorenz.

=== Appearances ===
She ranked at No. 65 on Maxim's "Hot 100" list for 2010. In the March 2015 issue of Playboy magazine, Serratos was featured in the "Becoming Attractions" section.

== Personal life ==
Serratos is an animal rights activist and has posed for a number of PETA campaigns promoting a vegan lifestyle. She is a vegan.

Christian has been in a relationship with David Boyd, a singer-songwriter, since 2014. They have one daughter (b. 2017).

== Filmography ==
=== Film ===
Year	Film	Role	Notes
2008	Twilight	Angela Weber	
2009	The Twilight Saga: New Moon	Angela Weber	
2010	The Twilight Saga: Eclipse	Angela Weber	
2011	96 Minutes	Lena	
2011	The Twilight Saga: Breaking Dawn – Part 1	Angela Weber	
2012	The Twilight Saga: Breaking Dawn – Part 2	Angela Weber	Credit only
2013	Pop Star	Roxie Santos	
2014	Flight 7500	Raquel Mendoza	

=== Television ===
Year	Title	Role	Notes
2004–2007	Ned's Declassified School Survival Guide	Suzie Crabgrass	Recurring role (season 1–3), 44 episodes
2005	Zoey 101	Girl #1	Episode: "School Dance"
2006	7th Heaven	Receptionist	Episode: "Broken Hearts and Promises"
2006	Cow Belles	Heather Perez	Disney Channel Original Movie
2007	Hannah Montana	Alexa	Episode: "The Idol Side of Me"
2011	American Horror Story: Murder House	Becca	Episode: "Pilot"
2011–2012	The Secret Life of the American Teenager	Raven	Recurring role (season 4–5), 9 episodes
2014–2022	The Walking Dead	Rosita Espinosa	Recurring (season 4), also starring (seasons 5–7), main (season 7–11); 94 episodes
2020–2021	Selena: The Series	Selena	Main role; 18 episodes
2022	Love, Death & Robots	Harper	Episode: "In Vaulted Halls Entombed"
TBA	More	Londyn Lorenz	Main role

=== Music videos ===
Year	Title	Role	Musicians
2018	Drew Barrymore	Love Interest	Bryce Vine

== Awards and nominations ==
Year	Award	Category	Nominated work	Result	Refs
2008	29th Young Artist Awards	Best Performance in a TV Series – Recurring Young Actress	Ned's Declassified School Survival Guide	Nominated	
2009	30th Young Artist Awards	Best Performance in a Feature Film – Supporting Young Actress	Twilight	Won	
2021	36th Imagen Awards	Best Actress—Television Drama	Selena: The Series	Nominated	
