= California Scheming =

- Directed by: Marco Weber
- Written by: Marco Weber
- Produced by: Marco Weber; Anne Caroline Weber; Elyse Estrada
- Starring: Gia Mantegna; Spencer Daniels; Rachel Seiferth; Devon Werkheiser
- Cinematography: Damien Steck
- Edited by: Russell August Anderson; Marco Weber
- Production company: Rapid Eye Film
- Distributed by: Gravitas Ventures
- Release date: January 31, 2014
- Running time: 99 minutes
- Country: United States
- Language: English

California Scheming is a 2014 American psychological thriller written and directed by Marco Weber. The film stars Gia Mantegna, Spencer Daniels, Rachel Seiferth and Devon Werkheiser.

== Synopsis ==
In Malibu, California, Chloe (Gia Mantegna), a teenage girl, finds an injured seagull on the beach and calls for two guys to help her out with it. The guys quickly become interested in this attractive girl and seem to do whatever she asks of them. One of the guys meets another girl, and Chloe just amps up her game of seduction.

== Cast ==
- Gia Mantegna as Chloe Vandersteen
- Spencer Daniels as Jason Rourke
- Rachel Seiferth as Hillary
- Devon Werkheiser Nick Behrle
- Claudia Christian as Mom
- Chad Lowe as Mr. Behrle
