= Where's the Money =

2017 film directed by Scott Zabielski

- Directed by: Scott Zabielski
- Written by: Ted Sperling; Benjamin Sutor & Scott Zabielski
- Story by: Ted Sperling; Dylan Sellers
- Produced by: Dylan Sellers; Zack Schiller
- Starring: Andrew Bachelor; Kat Graham; Logan Paul; Allen Maldonado; Josh Brener; Devon Werkheiser; Method Man; Retta; Mike Epps; Terry Crews
- Cinematography: Andrew Huebscher
- Edited by: Chris McKinley
- Music by: Math Club
- Production companies: Boies / Schiller Film Group; Rivers Edge Films
- Distributed by: Lionsgate
- Release date: October 20, 2017 (United States)
- Country: United States
- Language: English
- Budget: $1.5 million

Where's the Money is a 2017 American comedy film directed by Scott Zabielski and written by Ted Sperling and Benjamin Sutor. The film stars Andrew Bachelor, Kat Graham, Logan Paul, Terry Crews, Mike Epps, Method Man, and Josh Brener. The film had a limited release in theaters by Lionsgate on October 20, 2017.

== Plot ==
Del Goodlow has always lived in the Los Angeles hood and works at a gym his father started. The gym was meant to keep kids off the streets, from doing drugs and joining gangs. But now, his father is in jail and the gym is being driven into debt.

One day, Del's father Dre calls him and tells him he has a surprise. In jail, he informs Del about $1 million hidden in the basement of a flop house. Del goes to the address and finds that it has been turned into a fraternity. He tries to get into the basement by posing as a fire inspector but is caught because his badge is written in Spanish. He comes back later to rush the fraternity KAX. Del is sent to the side with the other non-white people, but coaxes them into leaving and joins with the white people.

After several initiation rituals which include spanking with bats, cleaning a house with toothbrushes, and wearing baby costumes at a house party, Del eventually earns the fraternity's trust and manages to steal the money, but is discovered by fraternity member Brock. Del convinces the other members he did not steal it and they go to a gym where Del discovers his friends have been tied up by his Uncle Leon, who has the money.

The fraternity, Del's mother, Uncle Leon, and a gang all want the money. As Leon holds the gang leader at gunpoint, he is killed by a falling air conditioner, which Del's mother had been constantly saying needed to be fixed. In the end, everyone gets some of the money, the gym is saved, and the leader of the gang gets a job at the gym. The KAX fraternity helps renovate the gym and do "real charity".

== Cast ==
- Andrew Bachelor as Del Goodlow
- Kat Graham as Alicia
- Terry Crews as Leon Goodlow
- Mike Epps as Dre Goodlow
- Method Man as Trap / Gang Leader
- Josh Brener as Clark
- Logan Paul as Eddie
- Retta as Del's mother
- Caleb Emery as Ben
- Allen Maldonado as Juice
- Devon Werkheiser as Brock

== Production ==
In April 2016, it was announced that Andrew "King Bach" Bachelor would star in the comedy film Where's the Money from Rivers Edge Films, with Dylan Sellers producing. On June 1, 2016, it was reported that Scott Zabielski would direct the film from Sellers' and Ted Sperling's story, and from a screenplay by Sperling and Benjamin Sutor, and producers would be Sellers and Zack Schiller, with Boies / Schiller Film Group financing the film. More cast was announced which included Logan Paul, Kat Graham, Terry Crews, Mike Epps, Method Man, Josh Brener, Retta, Caleb Emery, Allen Maldonado, and Devon Werkheiser.

Principal photography on the film began on June 1, 2016, in and around Los Angeles.

== Release ==
In September 2017, Lionsgate acquired the film's domestic distribution rights. The film had its limited release in theaters on October 20, 2017. Where's the Money was released on DVD and video on demand formats on October 24, 2017.
