= Gia Mantegna =

American actress

- Born: Gina Cristine Mantegna; April 17, 1990 (age 36); Manhattan, New York, U.S.
- Other name: Gina Mantegna
- Occupation: Actress
- Years active: 2003–present
- Father: Joe Mantegna
- Website: giamantegna.com

Gia Cristine Mantegna (born Gina Cristine Mantegna; April 17, 1990) is an American actress. She is known for her role as Devin Levin on the ABC sitcom The Middle.

== Early and personal life ==
Mantegna was born Gina Cristine Mantegna on April 17, 1990, in Manhattan to actor Joe Mantegna and Arlene Vrhel. While growing up Mantegna was a trained gymnast and ballerina. She plays piano and saxophone and is a skilled singer. Gia's older sister, Mia, works as a makeup artist. Mia was diagnosed with autism as a toddler, but her parents took the advice of a teacher and put her in a regular school, which helped her develop social skills.

== Career ==
Mantegna made her acting debut at age 13 in the 2003 film Uncle Nino, alongside Anne Archer, Trevor Morgan and her father, Joe Mantegna. She later appeared in 13 Going on 30. In 2006, Mantegna portrayed the character Grace Conrad in Warner Bros.' Christmas feature Unaccompanied Minors. She was cast as one of the main roles in the television movie Murder Book for Fox Broadcasting Company. She starred in The Neighbor alongside Matthew Modine, Michele Laroque and Ed Quinn.

She turned 18 in 2008, and decided to change her professional name to Gia.

In 2008, Mantegna made a guest appearance in the Season 3 episode, for the television series Criminal Minds, in which her father stars, wherein she portrayed an abducted teen named Lindsey Vaughn, who witnesses her best friend's death. She also appeared on The Secret Life of the American Teenager in a recurring role as Patty Mary.

In 2010, Mantegna starred in the independent feature And Soon the Darkness. She also appeared in the TeenNick television series Gigantic.

On December 9, 2010, Mantegna was announced as the 2011 Miss Golden Globe for the 68th Annual Golden Globe Award Ceremony.

In 2011, Mantegna starred in the found footage feature Apartment 143 and in the independent romantic comedy Getting That Girl. In addition to film roles, she played recurring characters on The Middle and Under the Dome.

In 2017, Mantegna reprised her Criminal Minds guest starring role as Lindsey Vaughn, now operating as a drug cartel hit woman.

== Filmography ==
=== Film ===
Year	Title	Role	Notes
2003	Uncle Nino	Gina Micelli	Credited as Gina Mantegna
2004	13 Going on 30	Gina	Credited as Gina Mantegna
2006	Unaccompanied Minors	Grace Conrad	Credited as Gina Mantegna
2007	In the Land of Women	Teenage Girl #3	Credited as Gina Mantegna
2007	The Neighbor	Ally	Credited as Gina Mantegna
2010	And Soon the Darkness	Camila	
2011	Apartment 143	Caitlin White	
2011	Getting That Girl	Mandy Meyers	
2013	Empire State	Vicky	
2013	The Frozen Ground	Debbie Peters	
2013	Jake Squared	Sarah	
2014	California Scheming	Chloe	
2014	Ask Me Anything	Jade	
2014	Squatters	Stephanie	
2014	The Prince	Beth	
2020	All for Nikki	Nikki Duke	Executive producer

=== Television ===
Year	Title	Role	Notes
2005	Murder Book	Claire Gilroy	Television movie, Credited as Gina Mantegna
2007	All I Want for Christmas	Mary	Television movie (Hallmark), Credited as Gina Mantegna
2008, 2017	Criminal Minds	Lindsey Vaughn/Carol Atkinson	Recurring role; 4 episodes (Seasons 3 & 12)
2008–2009	The Secret Life of the American Teenager	Patty Mary	Episodes: "What Have You Done to Me?"; Credited as Gina Mantegna, "Ciao", "Summertime"
2009	Medium	Devin Mitchell	Episode: "Who's That Girl"
2010–2011	Gigantic	Vanessa King	Main role; 18 episodes
2013	Perception	Erica Beecher	Episode: "Asylum" (Season 2 Episode 9)
2014–2017	The Middle	Devin Levin	Recurring role (Seasons 6–7), guest (season 8); 8 episodes
2015	Cheerleader Death Squad	Grace	Unsold television pilot
2015	Under the Dome	Lily Walters	Recurring role; 6 episodes (Season 3)
2017	Life After First Failure	Christina Robbins	Main role; 6 episodes
2018–2019	The Dead Girls Detective Agency	Charlotte Feldman	Main role; 35 episodes
2019	Magnum P.I.	Karen McDowell	Episode: "Black is the Widow"
