= Daran Norris =

American actor

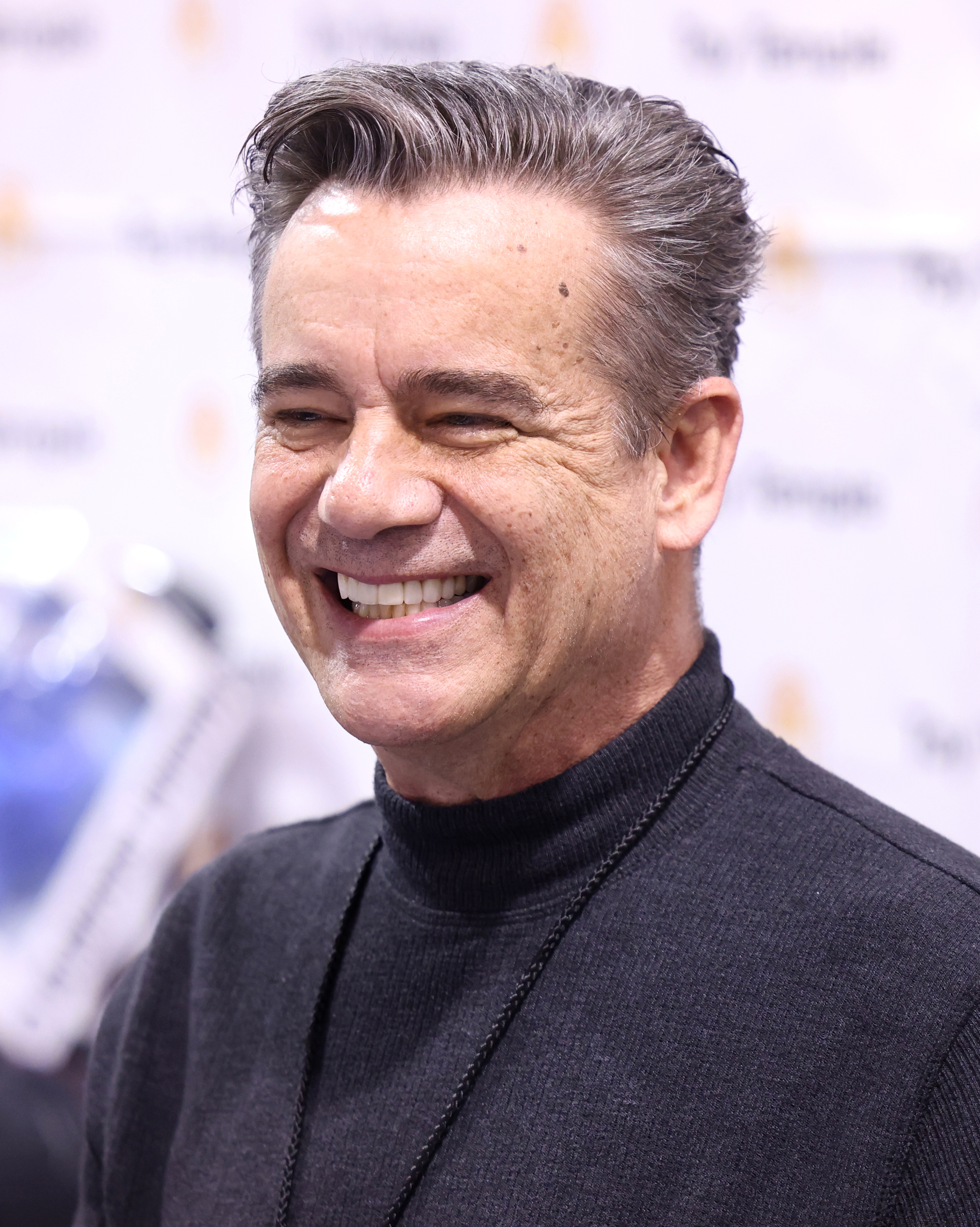
- Norris in 2025
- Born: Daran Morrison Nordland; November 1, 1964 (age 62); Ferndale, Washington, U.S.
- Other names: Justin Shyder; Chris Baker; Bob Thomas; Aaron Weslee; James Penrod
- Occupation: Actor
- Years active: 1988–present
- Spouses: Mary Elizabeth McGlynn (m. 1988; div. 2012) Ray Garcia (m. 2021)

Daran Morrison Nordland (born November 1, 1964), known professionally as Daran Norris, is an American actor. He has appeared or voiced characters in more than 400 films, video games, and television programs, including: Gordy in Ned's Declassified School Survival Guide; Cliff McCormack in Veronica Mars; the voices of Cosmo, Mr. Turner, Jorgen Von Strangle, and Anti-Cosmo in The Fairly OddParents franchise; Buddha Bob in Big Time Rush; Spottswoode in Team America: World Police, Knock Out in Transformers: Prime and Jack Smith on American Dad!. In anime, he is best known for his roles as Tasuki and Mercurymon in the English dubs of Fushigi Yûgi and Digimon Frontier respectively.

== Career ==
Norris has been an actor since 1988, beginning such work in television commercials for Pop-Tarts, and moving into film, television, and voice work in the 1990s.

=== Live action ===
His first film was Hobgoblins in 1988. Afterwards, he moved to television. He is known for playing Gordy in 44 episodes of Ned's Declassified School Survival Guide. Gordy is the "school's lazy, wacky janitor" who always goads Ned into rash actions while acting as Ned's go-to guy for advice. Norris recurred as Buddha Bob in the 2009 series Big Time Rush.

He portrayed Cliff McCormack, a public defender and family friend in the television drama Veronica Mars. The character of McCormack served as an ally to Keith and Veronica Mars and a client of Mars Investigations. He reprised the role in the movie, released in 2014, and the fourth season, which debuted on Hulu in 2019. He recurred on iZombie as weatherman turned anchorman Johnny Frost, from 2015 to 2019.

In 2015, it was announced that Norris would star as Phil Hartman in a film about him, directed by Jason Priestley.

=== Voice acting ===
Among his voice projects, Norris voiced Count Spankulot and various others in 22 episodes of Codename: Kids Next Door from 2002 through 2007, and 18 episodes of The Marvelous Misadventures of Flapjack from 2008 through 2009. He is noted for voicing the lead Dick Daring in 71 episodes of The Replacements from 2006 through 2009, and for voicing Mr. Turner, Cosmo, and Jorgen Von Strangle, for The Fairly OddParents franchise from 2001 to present, including 126 episodes of the television series, six specials, and seven TV movies. Norris reprised the roles for the crossover trilogy "The Jimmy Timmy Power Hour": The Jimmy Timmy Power Hour, The Jimmy Timmy Power Hour 2: When Nerds Collide, and The Jimmy Timmy Power Hour 3: The Jerkinators.

In October 2010, Norris voiced the Decepticon 'Knock Out' in The Hub TV network original series Transformers: Prime. Norris recurs as the voice of The Chief and The Chameleon in the 2010 series T.U.F.F. Puppy. He also played Mr. Turner in the special live-action television film A Fairly Odd Movie: Grow Up, Timmy Turner!. He voiced Jack Smith (Stan Smith's estranged father) on American Dad!.

In anime, he has voice acted in the English dub for the series Ghost in the Shell: Stand Alone Complex, Marvel Anime: Iron Man, Fushigi Yûgi and Digimon Frontier. In video games, he voiced Venom and various characters in the 2000 video game Spider-Man. Additionally, Norris has also done voice work for Burger King commercials.

== Personal life ==
Born in 1964 in Ferndale, Washington, Norris graduated from Ferndale High School in 1983, and married voice actress Mary Elizabeth McGlynn in 1988. They divorced in 2012.

Norris is queer and operates a performing arts school in Texas with his husband Ray Garcia, who is also an actor. The two married in 2021. They live in Bay City, where he is a board member and director of the Community Actors of South Texas.

== Filmography ==
=== Live action roles ===
==== Film ====
Year	Title	Role(s)	Notes
1988	Hobgoblins	Club Scum MC	
1989	Vice Academy	Laundromat John	
1998	Billy Frankenstein	George	Credited as Daran W. Norris
1998	Invisible Dad	Andrew Baily	Direct-to-video
1998	The Souler Opposite	Young Man	
1999	The Kid with X-ray Eyes	Harry Stamper	
2001	In the Bedroom	Red Sox Replay	Voice role
2004	The Greatest Short Film Ever!!!	Director	Short film
2004	Comic Book: The Movie	Commander Courage / Bruce Easly	
2007	Jekyll	Emcee	
2008	El Sonoma	Janitor Smithson	
2013	I Know That Voice	Himself	Documentary
2014	Veronica Mars	Cliff McCormack	
2023	The Killer	Deep South Lounge Greeter	
2025	Henry Danger: The Movie	Narrator	Voice role

==== Television ====
Year	Title	Role(s)	Notes
1991	Earth Angel	Flat Top	Television film
1995–1996	Mad TV	Waiter / Passbyer	
1999	Becker	Man	Episode: "Choose Me"
1999	The Jersey	Counselor	Episode: "Heroes"
2002	Son of the Beach	Karaoke Emcee	Episode: "Empty the Dragon"
2004–2007	Ned's Declassified School Survival Guide	Gordy; Cosmo	Recurring role (season 1); main role (seasons 2–3); Voice role (season 1)
2004–2007, 2019	Veronica Mars	Cliff McCormack	Recurring role
2005	Grounded for Life	Glamorous Man	Episode: "Tom Sawyer"
2007	Ben 10: Race Against Time	Diamondhead	Voice; television film
2008	Gym Teacher: The Movie	Announcer	Television film
2009	Imagination Movers	Captain Terrific	Episode: "Captain Terrific"
2009	Party Down	Tony Carolla	Episode: "Investors Dinner"
2009	Tracey Ullman's State of the Union	Larry King	Episode 2.1
2009–2013	Big Time Rush	Buddha Bob	Recurring role
2011	A Fairly Odd Movie: Grow Up, Timmy Turner!	Cosmo/Mr. Turner	Television film
2011	Desperate Housewives	Phil	Episode: "The Art of Making Art"
2012	A Fairly Odd Christmas	Cosmo/Mr. Turner	Television film
2014	A Fairly Odd Summer	Cosmo/Mr. Turner	Television film
2015	Dog with a Blog	Colonel Fink	Episode: "Stan's Secret is Out"
2015–2019	iZombie	Johnny Frost	Recurring role, 12 episodes
2016	Gamer's Guide to Pretty Much Everything	Jefferson Landry	Episode: "The Cabin"
2016	100 Things to Do Before High School	Janitor	Episode: "Leave Your Mark Thing!"; uncredited
2016	The Real O'Neals	Game Show Host	Episode: "The Real Dates"
2018	The Thundermans	Commander Dirk Trumbo	Episode: "The Thunder Games"
2022	The Fairly OddParents: Fairly Odder	Cosmo, Jorgen Von Strangle	Voice role
2025	The Thundermans: Undercover	Thunderford	Recurring role

=== Voice roles ===
==== Animation ====
Year	Title	Role(s)	Notes
1998–2001	Oh Yeah! Cartoons	Cosmo, Jorgen Von Strangle, Mr. Turner, various voices	
2000	Rocket Power	TV Reporter	Episode: "Snow Day/Welcome to the Club"
2000	Garbage Island	Santa Claus	
2001	Jason and the Heroes of Mount Olympus	Dracchus	
2001–2002	Time Squad	XJ5, Samuel Adams, Sinon, Winston Churchill, Joseph Stalin, Franklin D. Roosevelt, Louis Pasteur, Davy Crockett, Jack the Ripper, William Shakespeare, Phileander Knox / Vampire	
2001–2003	Oswald	Egbert, various voices	
2001–2004; 2017	Samurai Jack	X-49, Ra, Rama, Spartok, Gentleman, Barber, Chartman, Pirate Captain, Max	
2001–2017	The Fairly OddParents	Cosmo, Jorgen Von Strangle, Mr. Turner, various voices	Main role
2002–2004	The Powerpuff Girls	Stanley Practice, Voodooric, various voices	
2002–2005	The Adventures of Jimmy Neutron: Boy Genius	Nanobot #1, Baby Quackers	3 episodes
2002–2008	Codename: Kids Next Door	Count Spankulot, Big Brother, Judge Heerkumsduh, various voices	
2003–2005	What's New, Scooby-Doo?	Ugo DiRinaldi, Shopkeeper, Camel Sam, Tourist Dad, Sheriff	
2003–2005	My Life as a Teenage Robot	Shop Teacher, Mopey, Old Lady No. 2	Episode: "Attack of the 5 1/2 Ft. Geek/Doom with a View"
2003–2005	Star Wars: Clone Wars	Durge, Ki-Adi-Mundi, Tarr Seirr, Daakmen Barrek, Even Piell	
2003–2005	Tutenstein	Luxor, additional voices	Seasons 1–2; as Vince Del Castillo
2004	Johnny Bravo	Webble Wobble, Arctic Hound, Gardener, Horse, Weightlifter	2 episodes
2004	Megas XLR	Gynok, Brock	Episode: "Thanksgiving Throwdown"
2004	Go Go Moba Boy	Henrich Strack/Destructo Man, Barf Bunny	Pilot
2004–2006	Jimmy Timmy Power Hour	Cosmo, Mr. Turner, Jorgen Von Strangle, Anti-Cosmo	Television film
2005	Stroker & Hoop	Santa Claus, Elf, Mall Cop	
2005	Danny Phantom	Bullet, Newscaster	Episode: "Public Enemies"
2005	Duck Dodgers	Fox Bounty Hunter, Cyborg No. 1, Hungortus	Episode: "Good Duck Hunting/Consumption Overruled"
2005	The Batman	Brent	Episode: "Meltdown"
2005	The Buzz on Maggie	Dr. Electric, Flynator	
2005–2006	The Life and Times of Juniper Lee	Mr. Radcliffe, Camel, Steven the Sandman, Mr. Rosskins	
2005–2024	American Dad!	Jack Smith	
2006–2009	The Replacements	Dick Daring	
2006	W.I.T.C.H.	Tynar	Episode: "B is for Betrayal"
2006	Foster's Home for Imaginary Friends	Imaginary Man	Episode: "Challenge of the Superfriends"
2006	Loonatics Unleashed	Ralph Runner, Alien Dad	Episode: "The Family Business"
2006	Codename: Kids Next Door - Operation Z.E.R.O.	Count Spankulot	Television film
2007	Random! Cartoons	Conrad	Episode: "SamSquatch"
2007	El Tigre: The Adventures of Manny Rivera	Emilliano Suarez, various voices	
2007	Chowder	Bubble Gum Vendor, Screaming Vendor	Episode: "Grubble Gum"
2007–2015	WordGirl	Seymour Smooth, Nocan the Contrarian	
2008–2009	The Spectacular Spider-Man	J. Jonah Jameson, John Jameson / Colonel Jupiter	
2008–2009	The Marvelous Misadventures of Flapjack	Dock Hag, Dashing Danny, various voices	
2010	DC Super Friends	Batman	Short
2010	Handy Manny	Jack	Episode: "Big Construction Job"
2010–2012	Kick Buttowski: Suburban Daredevil	Additional voices	
2010–2015	T.U.F.F. Puppy	The Chief, The Chameleon, Jack Rabbit, Bad Dog, various voices	
2011	Generator Rex	Coach, Burly Jock	Episode: "Without A Paddle"
2011	Dan Vs.	Colby	Episode: "Dan Vs. The Family Camping Trip"
2011	Fish Hooks	Scientist	Episode: "Parasite Fight"
2011	Scooby-Doo! Mystery Incorporated	Skipper's Brother	Episode: "The Siren's Song"
2011	Back at the Barnyard	Leader	Episode: "Aliens!!!"
2011–2013	Transformers: Prime	Knock Out, Trooper No. 3, Seeker No. 1	
2012	The Avengers: Earth's Mightiest Heroes	Police Chief	Episode: "Along Came a Spider"
2013–2016	Turbo Fast	Mel Shellman, Dr. Shellman, Line Cutter Snail, Worker Snail No. 1, Old Timey Announcer, Bailiff, Spa Yetti, Mama Shellman, Bulgarian Television Announcer, Land Shark	
2015–2016	Mixels	Snoof, Waka, Spugg, Tiketz, Mixapod	2 episodes
2016	Bunnicula	Agent 51	Episode: "Area 50 Bunn"
2016	Teenage Mutant Ninja Turtles	Wingnut	Episode: "Bat in the Belfry"
2016	The Mr. Peabody & Sherman Show	Allan Pinkerton	Episode: "Allan Pinkerton"
2016	Wander Over Yonder	Mittens	Episode: "The End of the Galaxy"
2016–2022	The Loud House	Various voices	8 episodes
2017–2018	Bunsen Is a Beast	Cosmo, Mr. Turner, Troll No. 2, Fuzzy Fred Friendly, TV, narrator	3 episodes
2018–2019	The Adventures of Rocky and Bullwinkle	Narrator, Evil Chicken	Series regular
2019–2022	Victor and Valentino	Bone Boys Mic & Hun	
2021	The Casagrandes	Coach Niblick	Episode: "Tee'd Off"
2022	Transformers: EarthSpark	Mr. Smelt	Episode: "Family and Friends"
2023	The Proud Family: Louder and Prouder	Clone Papi	Episode: "Us Again"
2023	Hailey's On It!	Rod Toolman	Episode: "U.F.Whoa!"
2024	The Fairly OddParents: A New Wish	Cosmo, Jorgen Von Strangle, Anti-Cosmo	Main role

==== Anime ====
Year	Title	Role(s)	Notes
1989	Akira	Gym Teacher	English dub
1993	Doomed Megaopolis	Astronomy Teacher	English dub
1996	Hyper Doll	Detective Todo	English dub
1996	Giant Robo	Zangetsu the Mid-day	English dub (Animaze dub)
1997	Black Jack	Tokio Umetani	English dub
1997	Street Fighter II V	Narrator	English dub (Manga Ent. version)
1997	El Hazard: The Wanderers	Villager	English dub
1998	Fushigi Yûgi	Tasuki	English dub
1998	Bastard!!	Dark Schneider	English dub
1999	Cowboy Bebop	Cowboy Andy Von de Oniyate, Morgan	English dub
1999	Battle Athletes Victory	Lahrri's Coach, Exercise Voice	English dub
2000	Dinozaurs	Dino Toro, Dark Dragon	English dub
2000	Outlaw Star	Ctarl Ctarl officer	English dub
2001	Mon Colle Knights	Gabriolis, Redda	English dub
2001	Gate Keepers	Fiancé	English dub
2001	Mobile Suit Gundam: The 08th MS Team	Yuri Kellarney	English dub
2001–2002	Transformers: Robots in Disguise	Heavy Load	English dub
2002–2003	Digimon Frontier	Mercurymon, Sakkakumon	English dub
2003–2005	Lupin the 3rd Part II	Marcal Daran/George Marshall, H. Von Meyer	English dub
2004	Ghost in the Shell: Stand Alone Complex	Nanao	English dub
2005	Ghost in the Shell: S.A.C. 2nd GIG	Sergeant Rod	English dub
2005	Naruto	Sangorou	English dub
2010	Stitch!	Peter / Goodman	English dub; episodes 18 & 24
2011	Marvel Anime: Iron Man	Editor Nomura	English dub
2012–2013	Tiger & Bunny	Alexander Lloyds, Mario	English dub

==== Film ====
Year	Title	Role(s)	Notes
1995	Meltdown	The Doctor	American dub (2001)
1996	They Were Eleven	Doctor, Instructor No. 1	English dub
1998	Ninku: The Movie	Touji	English dub
2001	Ah! My Goddess: The Movie	Hikozaemon Ohtaki	English dub
2002	Cowboy Bebop: The Movie	Vincent Volaju	English dub
2003	The Little Polar Bear	Brutus	English dub
2003	WXIII: Patlabor the Movie 3	Kiichi Goto	English dub
2004	Team America: World Police	Spottswoode	
2006	Asterix and the Vikings	Vitalstatsisx	English dub
2007	Naruto the Movie: Ninja Clash in the Land of Snow	Sandayu Asama	English dub
2008	Bolt	Louie	
2009	Naruto Shippuden the Movie	Mouryou	English dub
2013	Escape from Planet Earth	Orientation Film Host	
2013	Tiger & Bunny: The Beginning	Alexander Lloyds, Mario	English dub
2013	Transformers Prime Beast Hunters: Predacons Rising	Knock Out	
2021	Seal Team	Roger, Radio DJ	
2024	Thelma the Unicorn	Stable Hand	
2025	Fixed	Napoleon	

==== Video games ====
Year	Title	Role(s)	Notes
1997	Dilbert's Desktop Games	Techno Bill, Cheesy Announcer, Fool Voices	
1998	Jade Cocoon: Story of the Tamamayu	Koris, Kikinak	
1998	King's Quest VIII: Mask of Eternity	Ice Lord, King Graham, Weapons Dealer Gnome	
2000	Spider-Man	Venom/Eddie Brock, Mysterio, Scorpion, Captain America, Human Torch, Punisher	
2000	Ground Control	Squad and Dropship Voices	
2001	Spider-Man 2: Enter Electro	Shocker, Beetle, Sandman, Charles Xavier, Thug	
2002	The Scorpion King: Rise of the Akkadian	Hammet, Set	
2002	The Lord of the Rings: The Fellowship of the Ring	Aragorn, Tom Bombadil	Credited as Darren Norris
2002	Star Wars: The Clone Wars	Dark Acolyte, engineer, Old Obi-Wan	Credited as Darren Norris
2002	The Mark of Kri	Rongo	
2002	Minority Report	Roy Verhaegen	
2003	.hack//Infection	Piros	English version
2003	.hack//Mutation	Piros	English version
2003	Star Wars: Knights of the Old Republic	Zelka Forn	
2003	The Hobbit	Gollum	Credited as Darren Norris
2003	The Fairly OddParents: Breakin' da Rules	Cosmo, Jorgen Von Strangle, Mr. Turner, Crimson Chin, Comicbook Anchorman	
2003	Armed & Dangerous	Henry, Q1–12, Shrub Patrol 1	Credited as Darren Norris
2003	.hack//Outbreak	Piros	English version
2003	Nickelodeon Toon Twister 3-D	Cosmo	
2003	Crimson Skies: High Road to Revenge	Soloho Salawa, Deputy, Militia	
2004	Onimusha Blade Warriors	Osric	English version
2004	.hack//Quarantine	Piros	English version
2004	Tales of Symphonia	Rodyle, Shadow	English version
2004	The Fairly OddParents: Shadow Showdown	Cosmo, Jorgen Von Strangle, Mr. Turner, Crimson Chin, Comicbook Anchorman	
2004	Onimusha 3: Demon Siege	Soldier	
2004	Transformers	Red Alert, Cyclonus	
2004	EverQuest II	Generic Amygdalan Enemy, Generic Dragon Enemy, Generic Centaur Enemy	
2004	Vampire: The Masquerade – Bloodlines	Officer Chunk, Simon Milligan, Cal	
2004	Nicktoons Movin'	Cosmo	
2004	Star Wars Knights of the Old Republic II: The Sith Lords	G0-T0	
2005	Nicktoons Unite!	Cosmo, Jorgen Von Strangle	
2005	Doom 3	Sergeant Kelly	Credited as Darran Norris
2005	Madagascar	Announcer, sailor, Construction Worker, Cop	
2005	Codename: Kids Next Door – Operation: V.I.D.E.O.G.A.M.E.	Count Spankulot	
2005	Kingdom of Paradise	Uzo	English version
2005	Ratchet: Deadlocked	Dallas	
2006	Naruto: Ultimate Ninja	Gatou, Kaji	English version
2006	.hack//G.U. vol.1//Rebirth	Piros the 3rd, Grein, Salvador Aihara	English version
2006	God Hand	Belze, Great Sensei	English version
2006	Nicktoons: Battle for Volcano Island	Cosmo	
2007	.hack//G.U. vol.2//Reminisce	Piros the 3rd, Grein, Salvador Aihara	English version
2007	Ratchet & Clank Future: Tools of Destruction	Narrator	
2007	.hack//G.U. vol.3//Redemption	Piros the 3rd, Grein, Salvador Aihara	English version
2007	Nicktoons: Attack of the Toybots	Cosmo, Jorgen von Strangle	
2007	Bee Movie Game	Honex	
2008	Ninja Gaiden II	Volf	English version
2008	Spider-Man: Web of Shadows	J. Jonah Jameson	
2008	Kung Fu Panda: Legendary Warriors	Gorilla Boss, Yak Minion No. 1	
2009	Ninja Gaiden Sigma 2	Volf	English version
2010	Final Fantasy XIII	Cocoon Inhabitants	English version
2011	Star Wars: The Old Republic	Gault Rennow, Colonel Darok	
2012	Transformers: Prime – The Game	Knock Out	
2025	Nicktoons & The Dice of Destiny	Cosmo, Jorgen Von Strangle, Crimson Chin	

==== Theme park ====
Year	Title	Role(s)	Notes
2003	Jimmy Neutron's Nicktoon Blast	Cosmo	
