= Devon Werkheiser =

American actor (born 1991)

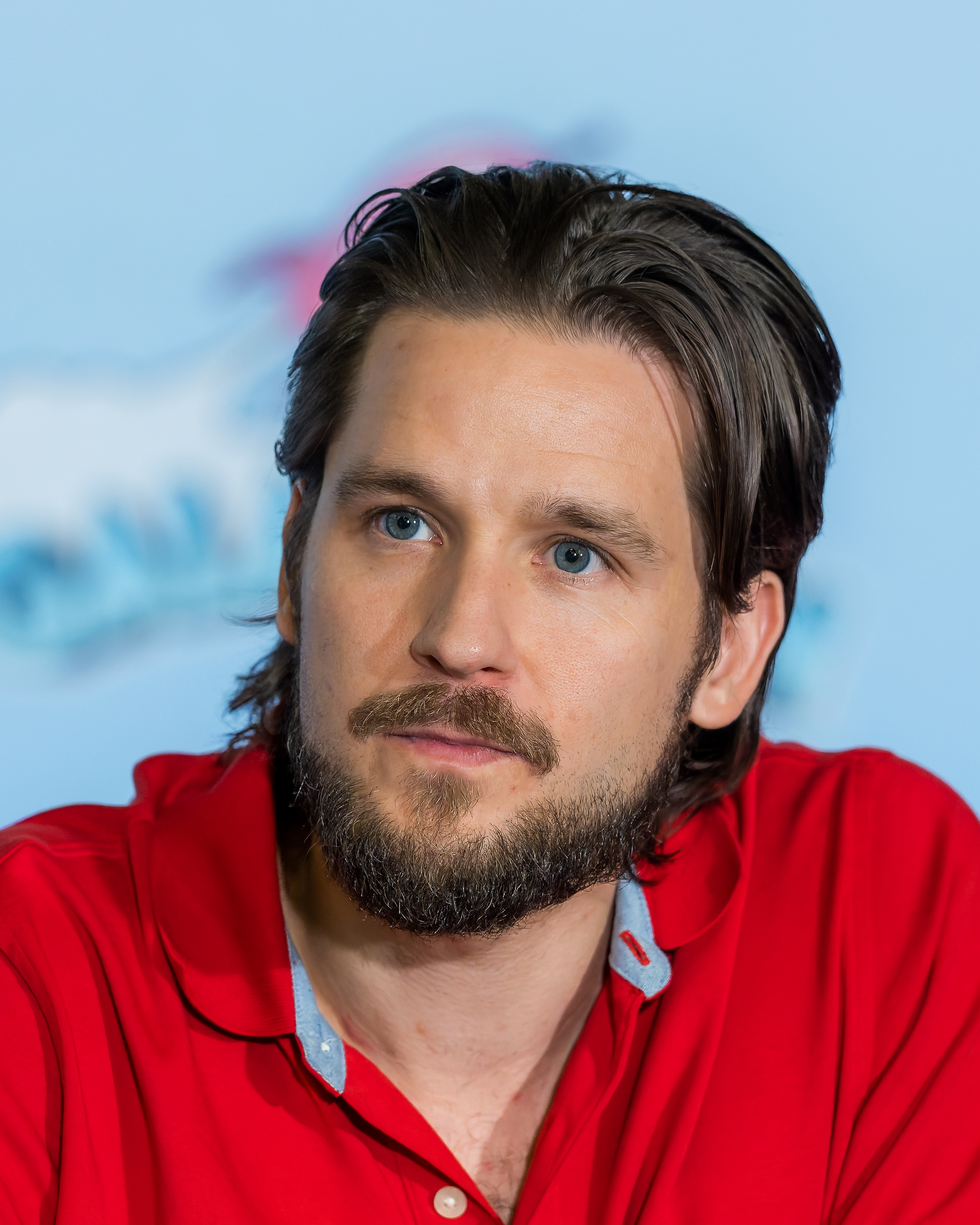
- Werkheiser at GalaxyCon San Jose in 2026
- Born: Devon Joel Werkheiser; March 8, 1991 (age 35); Atlanta, Georgia, U.S.
- Other name: Good/Vlly
- Occupations: Actor; singer-songwriter
- Years active: 2002–present
- Musical career
- Genres: Pop; Pop Rock; alternative rock
- Instruments: Vocals; guitar
- Label: Universal Motown (2007–11)

Devon Joel Werkheiser (born March 8, 1991) is an American actor and singer-songwriter. As an actor, Werkheiser is best known for his starring role as Ned Bigby on the Nickelodeon sitcom Ned's Declassified School Survival Guide, and for his role as the lead character Nolan Byrd in the 2007 Nickelodeon television movie Shredderman Rules. Werkheiser also played Peter Parkes in the fourth and final season of the ABC Family series Greek.

== Early life ==
Werkheiser was born Devon Joel Werkheiser on March 8, 1991, in Atlanta, Georgia, to Valerie (née Hudak) and Gary Werkheiser, and raised in nearby Johns Creek. He has one sister named Vanessa. His parents enrolled him in acting classes at the Talent Factory, a local children’s acting program.

== Career ==
=== Acting ===
After landing a minor role in We Were Soldiers, Werkheiser and his mother moved to Los Angeles to pursue his acting career. In 2003, he had a main role as Max Korda in the TV movie Recipe for Disaster. Since his arrival in Hollywood, Werkheiser has landed several television and film roles, the biggest of which is that of Ned Bigby on Ned's Declassified School Survival Guide. He was cast as Ned in February 2003 and had missed much of the school year due to production and had to wait 10 months before it was picked up. Werkheiser lent his voice in movies such as: Casper's Scare School the voice of as Casper the Friendly Ghost, Casper's Shadow, and Good Dragon and The Wizzard of Krudd as the voice of Gordo.

In 2007, Werkheiser starred in a Nickelodeon movie based on Wendelin Van Draanen's Shredderman book series Shredderman Rules as Nolan Byrd/Shredderman. Later that year, Werkheiser played the role of Chris Marino in Lifetime original movie Christmas in Paradise. In 2009, Werkheiser starred as Victor in the movie The First Time. He played the role of Victor, who has an incurable crush on hot senior Anya, who is way out of his league and she doesn't have a clue he exists. He also had a significant role in the movie The Prankster, in which he played the role of Brad Burris.

In 2011, Werkheiser played the role of Danny in the horror thriller movie Beneath the Darkness. In 2012, he played the lead role of Cassidy Warren in web series Never Fade Away. In 2013 Werkheiser starred as Max in the horror film The Wicked. He played the supporting role of Brett in Lifetime movie Zephyr Springs also known as Deadly Spa. In 2014, Werkheiser starred as Nick Behrle in the movie California Scheming and had a role as Fitch in the movie Helicopter Mom.

In 2016, Werkheiser starred as Jason in the television movie Bad Sister, which premiered on Lifetime on January 4, 2016; in the movie his character is stalked by the school's newest nun. He hosted DanceOn's first competition series Dance-Off Juniors on free mobile-streaming service Go90, which premiered on April 20, 2016. In summer 2016, Werkheiser starred as Logan in the romantic comedy film Sundown directed by Fernando Librrija and co-starring Camilla Belle, Sean Marquette, and Sara Paxton. On December 5, 2016, he guest starred in an episode of 2 Broke Girls. In 2017, Werkheiser played the role of Brock in the comedy film Where's the Money alongside Andrew Bachelor and Logan Paul.

In 2018, he had a supporting role as Joey in the indie crime drama Break Night and played the role of a judge in the dance film To The Beat! alongside Alyson Stoner. Werkheriser played the role of Charlie in the web mini-series Rough Draft, which was released on YouTube on February 11, 2019. Werkheiser played the supporting role of Floyd Stiles in the crime film Crown Vic. In 2019, Werkheiser starred as Sam in the romantic comedy film Santa Girl alongside Jennifer Stone.

In 2021, Werkheiser was a member of the cast in the film Rust, when production was suspended after the Rust shooting incident which resulted in the death of cinematographer Halyna Hutchins. Production on the film was later scheduled to resume in early 2023.

=== Podcast ===
In January 2023, Werkheiser started a podcast called Growing Up with Devon Werkheiser presented by onomy.

In February 2023, Werkheiser started a rewatch podcast called Ned's Declassified Podcast Survival Guide with Lindsey Shaw and Daniel Curtis Lee under the network PodCo.

=== Music ===
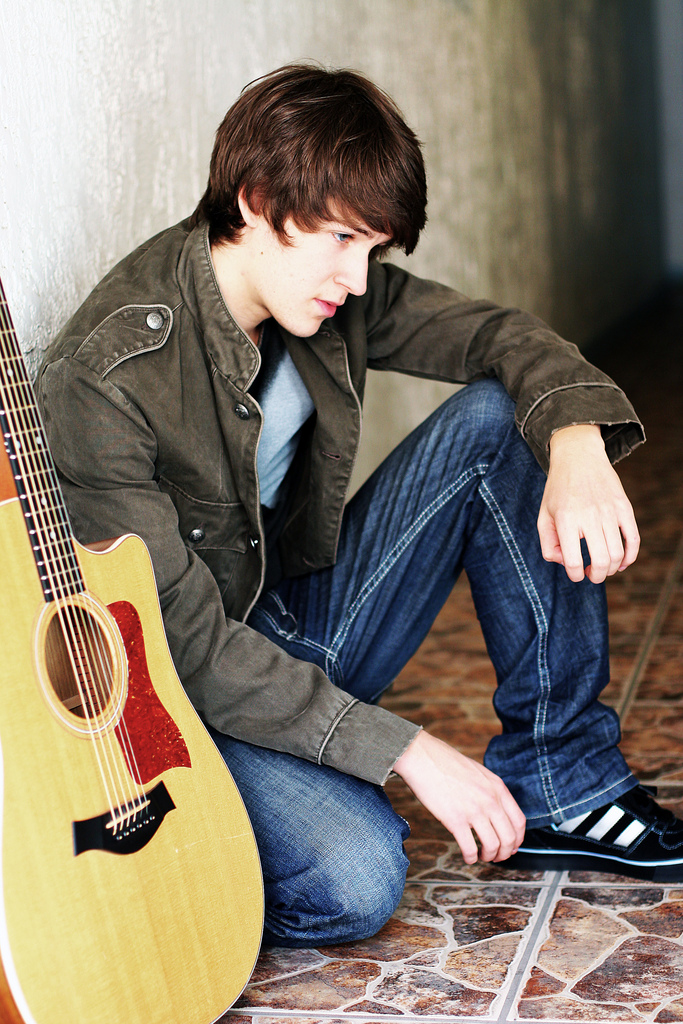
Werkheiser in February 2010

Werkheiser was signed with Universal Motown, however his label status on Myspace later changed to unsigned. He performed live shows with female vocalists Kristen Marie Hollyin and Britney Christian.

His first single, "If Eyes Could Speak", was released April 1, 2010 on iTunes. The official music video was released via YouTube on June 15, 2010. It stars himself and his partner at the time, Molly McCook. His second single, "Sparks Will Fly", was released July 29, 2010 on iTunes.

He released his first EP I Am on June 25, 2013. On June 9, 2015, he released his second EP Here and Now. On January 3, 2016, Werkheiser released the single "Stuck On the Ground". He released the single "Fire" on January 22, 2016. On January 29, 2016, Werkheiser released a stripped version of "Stuck on the Ground".

On April 23, 2020, he released his third EP Chapter One, which consists of five songs.

In 2023, Werkheiser founded a new musical project called Good/Vlly, moving away from his previous singer-songwriter material in favor of a more electronic sound. His first EP under the project, Brief Romance, was released on October 24, 2023.

== Personal life ==
Werkheiser was in a relationship with his co-star Lindsey Shaw, during the last few months of filming Ned's Declassified School Survival Guide, and afterwards for over a year.

== Filmography ==
=== Film ===
Year	Title	Role	Notes
2002	We Were Soldiers	Steve Moore	
2009	The First Time	Victor Knudsen	Also known as Love at First Hiccup
2010	The Prankster	Brad Burris	
2010	Marmaduke	Golden Dog / Cocker Spaniel	Voice role
2011	Beneath the Darkness	Danny	
2013	The Wicked	Max Reese	
2014	California Scheming	Nick Behrle	
2014	Helicopter Mom	Fitch	
2015	Bad Sister	Jason	
2016	Sundown	Logan	
2017	Where's the Money	Brock	
2018	Break Night	Joey	
2018	To the Beat!	Judge	
2019	Crown Vic	Floyd Stiles	
2019	Santa Girl	Sam	Direct-to-video
2024	Rust	Boone LaFontaine	

=== Television ===
Year	Title	Role	Notes
2003	Recipe for Disaster	Max Korda	Television movie
2004–2007	Ned's Declassified School Survival Guide	Ned Bigby	Lead role
2006	Casper's Scare School	Casper/Casper's Shadow/Good Dragon	Television movie; voice role
2007	The Wizzard of Krudd	Gordo	Television movie; voice role
2007	Shredderman Rules	Nolan Byrd/Shredderman	Television movie (Nickelodeon)
2007	Christmas in Paradise	Chris Marino	Television movie (Lifetime)
2009	American Dad!	Benny	Episode: "Stan Time"
2009	Three Rivers	Bobby	Episode: "Code Green"
2010	Memphis Beat	Troy Groves	Episode: "Baby, Let's Play House"
2010	Scared Shrekless	Teenager #2 / Teenager #3	Television special; voice role
2010	The Quinn-tuplets	Teenage Martin Quinn	Unsold television pilot (CBS)
2011	Glenn Martin, DDS	Corey	Voice role; episode: "Glenn and the Art of Motorcycle Maintenance"
2011	Greek	Peter Parkes	Recurring role (season 4), 7 episodes
2012	Never Fade Away	Cassidy Warren	Web series; main role
2012	Criminal Minds	Billy Walton	Episode: "The Wheels on the Bus"
2013	Major Crimes	Buy Guy	Episode: "Pick Your Poison"
2013	Zephyr Springs	Brett	Television movie (Lifetime)
2014	Franklin & Bash	Josh Taylor	Episode: "Deep Throat"
2016	Bad Sister	Jason	Television movie (Lifetime)
2016	Dance-Off Juniors	Himself	Host; mobile streaming series (Go90)
2016	2 Broke Girls	Tyler	Episode: "And the About FaceTime"
2019	Rough Draft	Charlie	Web miniseries
2020	Artificial	Asher	TV series, 10 episodes
2021	Kontaxt		TV miniseries

=== Music video ===
Year	Title	Role	Notes
2023	"Christmas In L.A."	Santa	Home Free

== Discography ==
=== Studio albums ===
Title	Notes
Prologue	Released: September 5, 2016; Format: digital download; Label: Werkharder Records

=== Extended plays ===
Title	Notes
I Am	Released: June 25, 2013; Format: digital download; Label: Werkharder Records
Here and Now	Released: June 9, 2015; Format: digital download; Label: Werkharder Records
Chapter One	Released: April 23, 2020; Format: digital download; Label: Crystal Boy Records
Brief Romance (as Good/Vlly)	Released: October 24, 2023; Format: digital download; Label: Good/Vlly Music

=== Singles ===
Year	Title	Album
2007	"Superhero"	Shredderman Rules(DVD extra)
2010	"If Eyes Could Speak"	Prologue
2010	"Sparks Will Fly"	Non-album single
2013	"Stand Up"	I Am
2016	"Stuck on the Ground"	Prologue
2016	"Fire"	Prologue
2016	"Stuck on the Ground (Stripped)"	Non-album singles
2017	"Settle"	Non-album singles
2020	"Miles"	Chapter One
2020	"Revolution"	Chapter One
2021	"Phase"	Non-album singles
2021	"The Darkness & the Need"	Non-album singles
2023	"Anybody" (as Good/Vlly)	Brief Romance
2023	"Everything" (as Good/Vlly)	Brief Romance
2023	"Lay Around" (as Good/Vlly)	Brief Romance

=== Other appearances ===
All of the following were only released on Myspace.

Year	Song	Notes
2008	"141'	
2008	"Like The First Time (vol.1)"	
2008	"What Did I Miss?"	
2008	"To Do Right"	
2008	"So It Goes"	
2008	"Lonely Girl"	
2008	"Standing Tall"	
2008	"Take It All Away"	
2008	"It's Christmas"	
2009	"California Sun"	
2010	"One More Day" (featuring Daniel Curtis Lee)	
2010	"Never Walk Away"	
2010	"Lucky"	
2010	"You Wear it Well"	
2010	"Winter Wonderland"	
2011	"Like The First Time (vol. 2)"	
2011	"To Do Right (vol. 2)"	

== Awards and nominations ==
Year	Award	Category	Work	Result	Refs
2007	Young Artist Award	Best Performance in a TV Series (Comedy or Drama) – Leading Young Actor	Ned's Declassified School Survival Guide	Nominated	
2008	Young Artist Award	Best Performance in a TV Series (Comedy or Drama) – Leading Young Actor	Ned's Declassified School Survival Guide	Nominated	
2008	Young Artist Award	Best Performance in a TV Movie, Miniseries or Special – Leading Young Actor	Shredderman Rules	Nominated	
