= Lindsey Shaw =

American actress (born 1989)

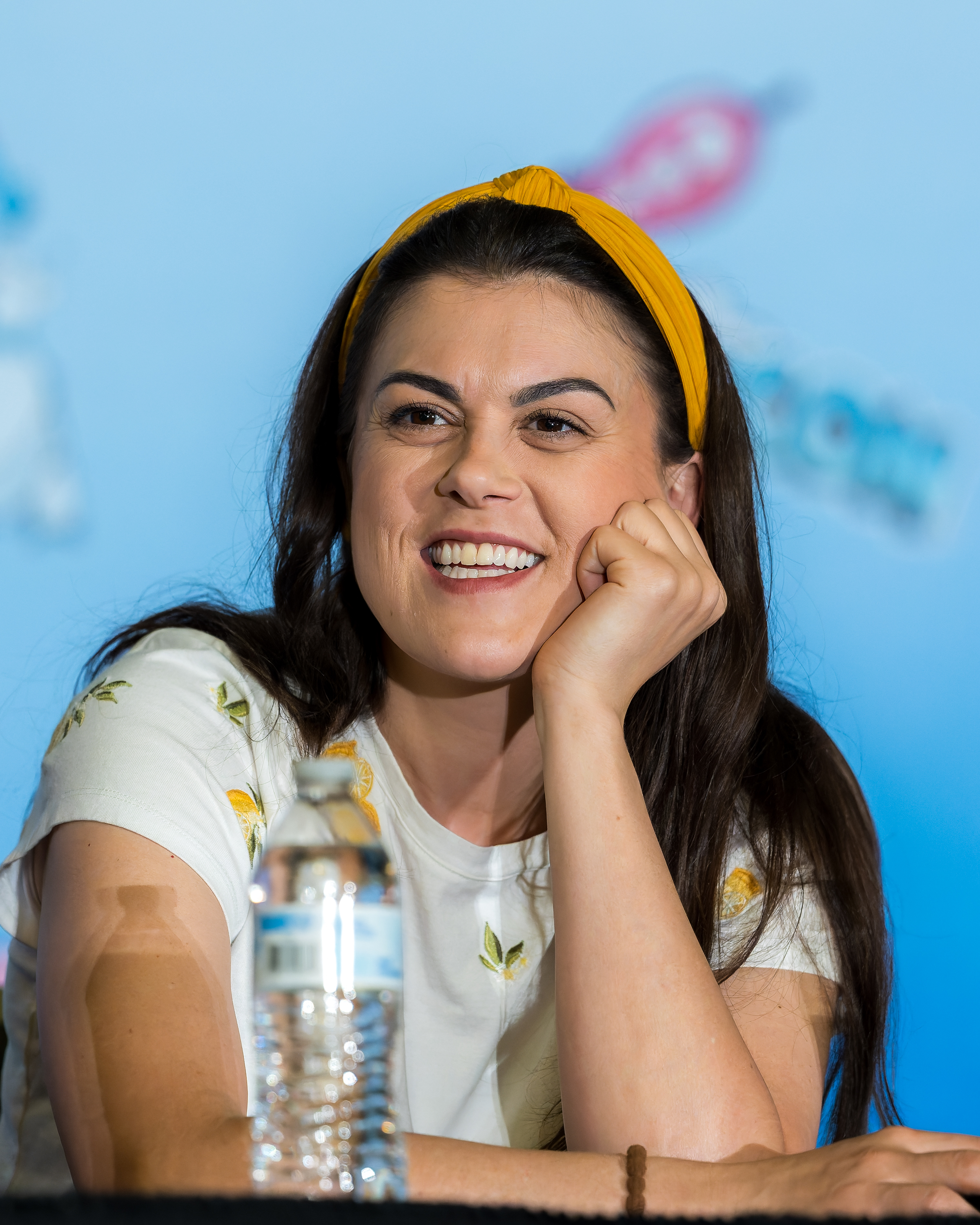
- Shaw at GalaxyCon San Jose in 2026
- Born: May 10, 1989 (age 37); Lincoln, Nebraska, U.S.
- Occupation: Actress
- Years active: 2002–present

Lindsey Marie Shaw (born May 10, 1989) is an American actress. She is known for playing Jennifer "Moze" Mosely on the Nickelodeon series Ned's Declassified School Survival Guide. She also co-starred in the 2007 CW sitcom Aliens in America, and was the lead on ABC Family's 2009 comedy series 10 Things I Hate About You. From 2011 to 2017, she played the recurring role of Paige McCullers on the ABC Family teen drama series Pretty Little Liars.

== Early life ==
Shaw was born on May 10, 1989 in Lincoln, Nebraska, to Barbara (née Sucha) and Michael "Mike" Shaw, where she was also raised. Shaw attended St. Peter Catholic School in her hometown before she and her mother moved to Los Angeles when she was 13 to pursue an acting career.

== Career ==
Shaw portrayed Jennifer Ann "Moze" Mosely on the Nickelodeon series Ned's Declassified School Survival Guide, which debuted in 2004 and ended in 2007 after three seasons. She dated her co-star Devon Werkheiser briefly. After the show ended, the sitcom Aliens in America debuted on The CW, where Shaw played the character Claire. Aliens in America was cancelled after one season, lasting only eighteen episodes.

Shaw played the lead role of Kat Stratford in 10 Things I Hate About You. The show lasted one season of twenty episodes.

Shaw was the 2010 Azalea Queen at the Azalea Festival in Wilmington, North Carolina. She starred as Trip alongside Andy Serkis in Ninja Theory's videogame Enslaved: Odyssey to the West, released in October 2010.

In 2011, she landed the recurring role of Paige McCullers, Emily's girlfriend on Pretty Little Liars. Also in 2011, Shaw appeared as Lisa in the ABC Family original film Teen Spirit. The following year, Shaw starred in the film 16-Love as Ally Mash, a hard-working tennis player who learns to loosen up with the help of a carefree male tennis player. She appeared as June in five episodes of the third and final season of the ABC sitcom Suburgatory.

Shaw joined the cast of Faking It in 2015 as Michael J. Willett's character Shane Harvey's sister, Sasha Harvey, who served as a love interest for Gregg Sulkin's character Liam Booker.

In February 2023, Shaw started a Ned's Declassified School Survival Guide rewatch podcast called Ned's Declassified Podcast Survival Guide with co-stars Devon Werkheiser and Daniel Curtis Lee under the network PodCo.

== Personal life ==
Shaw was in a relationship with her co-star Devon Werkheiser, during the last few months of filming Ned's Declassified School Survival Guide, and afterwards for over a year. On an episode of Ned's Declassified Podcast Survival Guide in July 2023, Shaw revealed that during the fifth season of Pretty Little Liars, she was let go due to an Adderall addiction and "relationship with food".

== Filmography ==
Film roles
Year	Title	Role	Notes
2010	Nic & Tristan Go Mega Dega	Aubrey	
2010	Devolved	Peggy	
2011	The Howling: Reborn	Eliana Wynter	Direct-to-video film
2012	16-Love	Ally Mash	Also executive producer
2012	No One Lives	Amber	
2012	Love Me	Sylvia Potter	also known as Love You to Death
2015	Yellow Day	Girl in church	
2016	Temps	Stephanie	
2018	1/1	Lissa	
2020	Reboot Camp	Maisey	
2023	As Certain As Death	Dayna	

Television roles
Year	Title	Role	Notes
2004–2007	Ned's Declassified School Survival Guide	Jennifer "Moze" Mosely	Main role
2007–2008	Aliens in America	Claire Tolchuck	Main role
2008	Eleventh Hour	Vivian Bingham	Episode: "Titans"
2009–2010	10 Things I Hate About You	Katerina "Kat" Stratford	Main role
2011	Teen Spirit	Lisa Sommers	Television movie (ABC Family)
2011–2017	Pretty Little Liars	Paige McCullers	Recurring role (seasons 1–5, 7); 45 episodes
2012	Body of Proof	Sophia Polley	Episode: "Mind Games"
2014	Suburgatory	June	Recurring role; 5 episodes
2015–2016	Faking It	Sasha Harvey	Recurring role; 4 episodes
2016	Hers and History	Karina	Main role
2016	Secret Summer	Rachel	Television movie
2021	Lucifer	Kate Jacobs	Episode: "Buckets of Baggage"
2025	99 to Beat	Contestant	Eliminated in 76th place

Music videos
Year	Title	Artist	Ref.
2009	"I Want You to Want Me" (10 Things I Hate About You version)	KSM	
2016	"Underneath"	Brandyn Burnette	

=== Video game ===
Year	Title	Role	Notes
2010	Enslaved: Odyssey to the West	Trip	Also motion capture

== Awards and nominations ==
Year	Award	Category	Nominated work	Result
2009	TV Guide Awards	Favorite Duo (shared with Meaghan Martin)	10 Things I Hate About You	Nominated
2009	TV Guide Awards	Favorite Ensemble (shared with Ethan Peck, Meaghan Martin, Larry Miller, Nicholas Braun, Dana Davis, Chris Zylka, Ally Maki, Kyle Kaplan and Allie Gonino)	10 Things I Hate About You	Nominated
