= Daniel Curtis Lee =

American actor, comedian and rapper (born 1991)

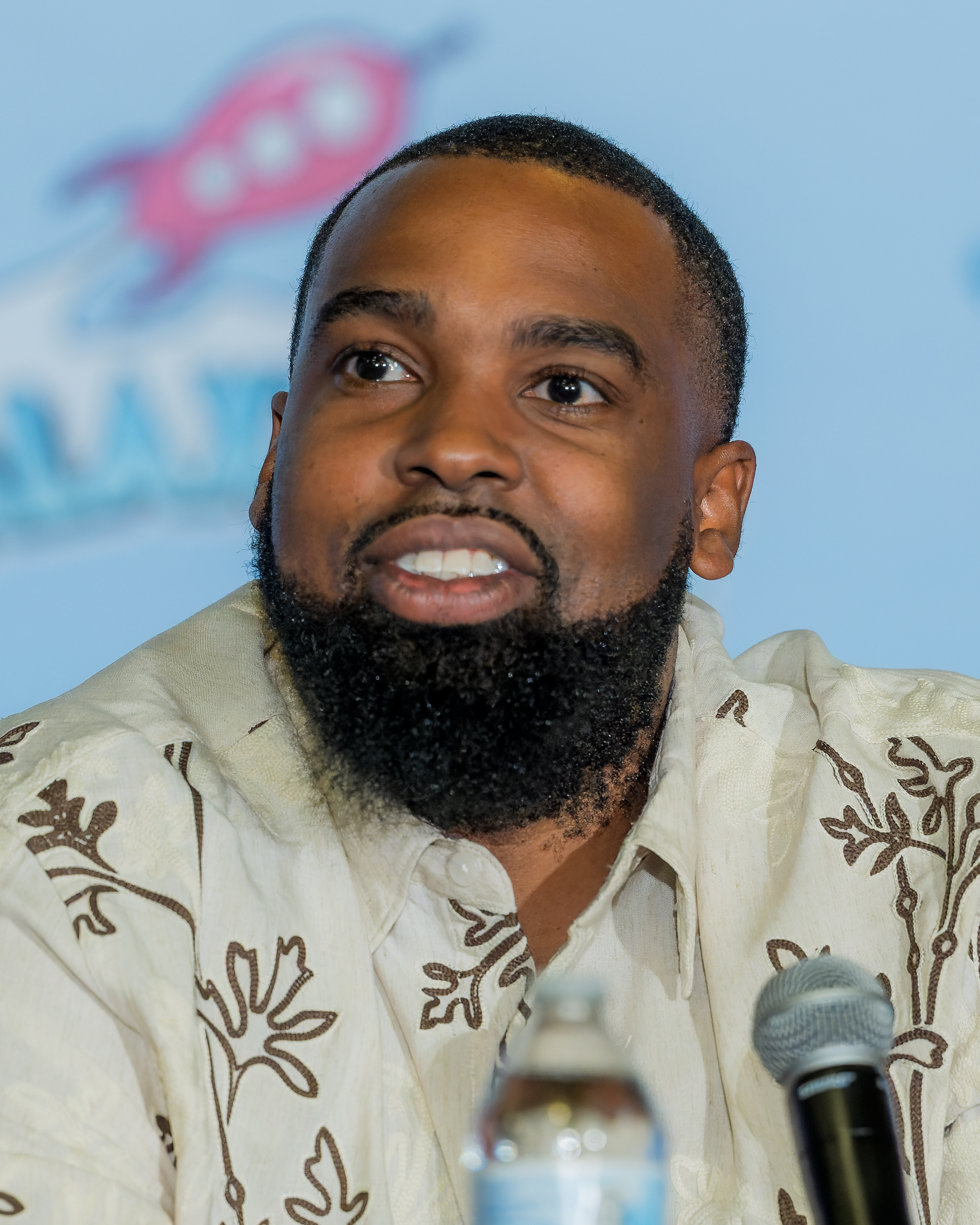
- Lee at GalaxyCon San Jose in 2026
- Born: May 17, 1991 (age 35); Jackson, Mississippi, U.S.
- Education: California State University, Long Beach
- Occupations: Actor; comedian; rapper; basketball player
- Years active: 2001–present
- Height: 1.83 m (6 ft 0 in)

Daniel Curtis Lee (born May 17, 1991) is an American actor, comedian and rapper, best known for portraying Simon "Cookie" Nelson-Cook on the Nickelodeon series Ned's Declassified School Survival Guide from 2004 to 2007.

== Early life ==
Lee was born in Jackson, Mississippi, on May 17, 1991, to Nathaniel Lee Sr., a producer, and Sharial Lee. His older brother, Nathaniel Lee Jr., is also an actor. He lived in Mississippi until the age of 10, when he relocated to Long Beach, California.

== Career ==
His breakthrough role came in 2004 when he started playing Simon "Cookie" Nelson-Cook on the Nickelodeon series Ned's Declassified School Survival Guide.

In the original 2003 pilot, “Cookie” was called “Boogie” and was played by actor Stephen Markarian, before Lee was cast a year later.

After Ned’s Declassified School Survival Guide ended in 2007, Lee would go on to play Kornelius "Kojo" Jonesworth on the Disney XD sitcom Zeke and Luther. He has also appeared in other television shows, such as First Monday and The Shield, and films such as Friday After Next.

Lee is also a rapper and releases his own solo works to Spotify. His debut album, Double Lit Double It, was released in 2020.

In February 2023, Lee started a podcast called Ned's Declassified Podcast Survival Guide with Devon Werkheiser and Lindsey Shaw under the network PodCo.

In November 2024, Lee along with Werkheiser and Shaw, announced that their partnership with PodCo has ended and that they will be running the podcast themselves, following the fall out from a comment made on a TikTok live by Werkheiser around the documentary Quiet on Set: The Dark Side of Kids TV. and Shaw's frustration about why their show has not received a reboot.

== Personal life ==
Lee is a former member of the Hollywood Knights, a celebrity basketball team. Lee graduated with a degree in linguistics from California State University Long Beach.

== Filmography ==
=== Television and film ===
Television and film roles
Year	Title	Role	Notes
2001	The Rising Place	Student	Film; uncredited
2002	First Monday	Corner Boy #1	Episode: "Court Date"
2002	Friday After Next	Bad Boy #2	Film
2003	The Shield	Cassius	Episode: "Dead Soldiers"
2004–2007	Ned's Declassified School Survival Guide	Simon "Cookie" Nelson-Cook	Main role
2009–2012	Zeke and Luther	Kornelius "Kojo" Jonesworth	Main role
2011	Good Luck Charlie	Raymond "Ray Ray" Blues	2 episodes
2011	Pixie Hollow Games	Starter Sparrowman	Television special; voice role
2012	Glee	Phillip "Phil" Lipoff	4 episodes
2015	Crazy Ex-Girlfriend	Ike the Waiter	1 episode
2019-2021	9-1-1	Rude Handler / Wade Weaver	2 episodes
2019	Evening Installation	Guy	Film
2020	Game On: A Comedy Crossover Event	Butch	1 episode
2022	NCIS	SRT #1	Episode: "Pledge of Allegiance"
2022	Monster	Police Photographer	Episode: "Please Don't Go"
2023	As Certain as Death	Jameson	
2023	Payment Received	Liam	
2025	Bart Bagalzby and the Garbage Genie	Billy Blaster	

=== Songs and music videos ===
- 2004 - "Ned's Declassified School Survival Guide Theme Song"
- 2009 - "Zeke and Luther Theme Song"
- 2009 - "U Can't Touch This" - Kojo / Himself
- 2010 - "In the Summertime" - Kojo / Himself (with Zeke and Luther co-star Adam Hicks)
- 2020 - “Double Lit Double It” (debut studio album)
