= Ned's Declassified School Survival Guide =

American television comedy series (2004-2007)

- Genre: Sitcom; Slapstick
- Created by: Scott Fellows
- Showrunner: Scott Fellows
- Starring: Devon Werkheiser; Lindsey Shaw; Daniel Curtis Lee; Jim J. Bullock; Daran Norris
- Composer: Guy Moon
- Country of origin: United States
- Original language: English
- No. of seasons: 3
- No. of episodes: 54 (list of episodes)

Production
- Executive producers: Scott Fellows; Bill O'Dowd; Jörg Westerkamp
- Producer: Lazar Saric
- Production locations: Nickelodeon on Sunset; Hollywood, California
- Camera setup: Film; Single-camera
- Running time: 22 minutes; 48 minutes (Field Trips, Permission Slips, Signs & Weasels)
- Production companies: Jack Mackie Pictures; Apollo ProMovie; Nickelodeon Productions

Original release
- Network: Nickelodeon
- Release: September 12, 2004 – June 8, 2007

Ned's Declassified School Survival Guide (sometimes shortened to Ned's Declassified) is an American live action sitcom on Nickelodeon that debuted on the Nickelodeon Sunday night TEENick scheduling block on September 12, 2004. The series' original pilot episode aired on September 7, 2003, and it was ordered to series by Nickelodeon in early 2004. The one-hour special movie series finale aired on June 8, 2007.

The show was produced by Apollo ProScreen GmbH & Co. Filmproduktion KG in association with Jack Mackie Pictures. Its main executive producer and creator is Scott Fellows, the head writer for The Fairly OddParents and creator of Johnny Test.

== Premise ==
Ned's Declassified School Survival Guide follows the lives of the titular character Ned Bigby, and his two best friends Jennifer "Moze" Mosely, and Simon "Cookie" Nelson-Cook, as they navigate their middle school years. The first season takes place during the first semester of seventh grade, the second season covers the second semester of seventh grade, and the third season takes place during eighth grade. Throughout the series, Ned builds up a number of 'tips' for his "survival guide", and uses the tips to help himself and his classmates cope with the standard struggles of middle school. Each individual episode relates to a topic in the guide, such as popularity, grades, or sports, as well as developing other plots (such as Ned's love life) throughout.

== Episodes ==
Season	Episodes	Originally released	
Season	Episodes	First released	Last released
1	13	September 12, 2004	February 19, 2005
2	20	October 1, 2005	June 3, 2006
3	21	September 24, 2006	June 8, 2007

== Cast ==
- Devon Werkheiser as Ned Bigby
- Lindsey Shaw as Jennifer "Moze" Mosely
- Daniel Curtis Lee as Simon "Cookie" Nelson-Cook
- Jim J. Bullock as Mr. Monroe (main role, season 1; recurring role, seasons 2–3)
- Daran Norris as Gordy (recurring role, season 1; main role, seasons 2–3)

== Locations ==
The show takes place at the fictional James K. Polk Middle School, named after the 11th President of the United States, James K. Polk. The school's colors are gold and green and its mascot is the Wolves, which is a common theme throughout the school's interior.

During the first season, all of the show's action took place within the school or its grounds, and with the exception of one or two notable occasions, everything happened indoors. However, during season 2, more outdoor shots were used, and on certain occasions, the show took place off school property. The show's finale, for example, took place almost entirely off the school grounds.

== Home media ==
In the United States, there have been four DVD releases made for the series.

- TEENick Picks, Volume 1 released on April 18, 2006 – features "Guide to: Computer Labs and Backpacks" (Season 1, Episode 9)
- Special Field Trip Edition released on August 28, 2007 – features "Field Trips, Permission Slips, Signs, and Weasels" and "Guide to: Dismissal and The School Play."
- The Best of Season 1 and The Best of Season 2 both released on September 23, 2008, exclusive to Amazon.com.

The first season of Ned's Declassified School Survival Guide was released on DVD in the Netherlands, Australia, and Belgium on April 9, 2009. The Netherlands also released the second season, although both seasons were only released with Dutch dubbing. It's unknown if it will follow in more places in Europe, or someplace else.

Alliance Home Entertainment has only released the first two seasons on DVD in Canada. The third and final season was supposed to be released on February 7, 2012, in Canada only, but production was delayed.

== Reception ==
=== Ratings ===
The debut of Ned's Declassified School Survival Guide on September 12, 2004, received a 4.5 rating, with 914,000 tween viewers, which was described as "healthy, but not as stellar" ratings by Variety's Denise Martin.

=== Critical ===
Robert Lloyd of Los Angeles Times upon reviewing the series finale of Ned's Declassified School Survival Guide remarked that it was "one of the best series on television — a show that took genre conventions and ran them through unpredictable changes".

== Proposed spin-off and reboot ==
In June 2008, Werkheiser signed a development contract with Nickelodeon for a sequel series that would deal with his character's adventures in high school. The show was never greenlit to production, due to the other major actors and executives from the original series being busy with their own projects – creator and executive producer Scott Fellows was working on another Nickelodeon show, Big Time Rush; Daniel Curtis Lee was committed to Disney XD's Zeke and Luther; and Lindsey Shaw was working as the lead on ABC Family's 10 Things I Hate About You.

In 2021, Werkheiser announced that he, along with cast members Daniel Curtis Lee and Lindsey Shaw, as well as original series creator Scott Fellows, had pitched a reboot titled Ned’s Declassified Adulthood Survival Guide to Nickelodeon and AwesomenessTV, but the proposal was turned down and the studios declined to allow them to shop it to other networks.

== Podcast ==
In February 2023, Devon Werkheiser started a podcast called Ned's Declassified Podcast Survival Guide with Lindsey Shaw and Daniel Curtis Lee under the network PodCo.
