= TSA (disambiguation) =

TSA is the Transportation Security Administration, a United States federal government agency.

TSA, tsa, tSA, or Tsa may also refer to:

== Organizations ==
- Technology Student Association
- Tenant Services Authority, a former regulatory body in England
- Thailand Swimming Association, the governing body for aquatic sports in Thailand
- Theosophical Society in America
- The Scout Association, a British scouting organisation
- The Sports Authority, former name of the defunct sports retailer Sports Authority
- Tourette Syndrome Association, former name of the Tourette Association of America
- Transpacific Stabilization Agreement, a research and discussion forum for the main transpacific container shipping lines
- Trans States Airlines, United States
- Turkish Space Agency, a government agency for national aerospace research in Turkey
- The Salvation Army

== Education ==
- Tattnall Square Academy, Macon, Georgia, United States
- Thinking Skills Assessment, a generic university admissions test
- Tiong Se Academy, Chinese school, the Philippines
- The Sharon Academy, Vermont, United States
- Territory-wide System Assessment, a Hong Kong academic assessment program from 2004 to 2016
- Tulane School of Architecture, New Orleans, Louisiana, United States
- Toledo School for the Arts, a public charter school in Toledo, Ohio, United States

== Places ==
- Taipei Songshan Airport (IATA code)
- Tri-State Airport in Huntington, West Virginia, United States (FAA: HTS)
- Tin Sau stop, Hong Kong (MTR station code)
- Titanium Security Arena, a sports stadium in Australia

== Science and technology ==
- TS/A, a mouse mammary carcinoma cell line
- Temperature swing adsorption, a gas separation technique
- Time Stamping Authority, carrying out cryptographic trusted timestamping
- Trichostatin A, an inhibitor of histone deacetylases
- Trypticase soy agar, a common laboratory plating media
- Tumor-specific antigen

== Art and entertainment ==
- TSA (band) (Tajne Stowarzyszenie Abstynentów or Teetotallers' Secret Association), a Polish heavy metal/hard rock band
- Transformation Story Archive, web site archiving amateur fiction
- Toilet Safety Administration, parody of the U.S. Transportation Security Administration in TV episode "Reverse Cowgirl" (South Park)

== Other uses ==
- Tax sheltered annuity or 403(b) plan
- Technicien supérieur de l'aviation, a certification in French civil aviation
- Treasury single account, a financial policy in Nigeria
- Tsaangi language, an ISO 639-3 code
- Tsa (Armenian letter)
