= C5orf24 =

Protein-coding gene in the species Homo sapiens

Identifiers
- Aliases: C5orf24, chromosome 5 open reading frame 24
- External IDs: MGI: 1925771; GeneCards: C5orf24

Gene location (Human)
Chr.	Chromosome 5 (human)
Band	5q31.1	Start	134,845,680 bp
Band	5q31.1	End	134,859,735 bp

Gene location (Mouse)
Chr.	Chromosome 13 (mouse)
Band	13|13 B1	Start	55,840,937 bp
Band	13|13 B1	End	55,851,313 bp
RNA expression pattern
Bgee	Human / Mouse (ortholog); Top expressed in: visceral pleura; tibia; parietal pleura; renal medulla; cardiac muscle tissue of right atrium; urethra; epithelium of lactiferous gland; lactiferous duct; cardia; postcentral gyrus / Top expressed in: superior cervical ganglion; interventricular septum; atrium; left lung lobe; iris; atrioventricular valve; mandibular prominence; olfactory epithelium; vas deferens; gastrula; More reference expression data
BioGPS	n/a
Orthologs
Databases	NCBI: entry; OMA: entry
Species	Human	Mouse
Entrez	134553	78521
Ensembl	ENSG00000181904	ENSMUSG00000045767
UniProt	Q7Z6I8	Q80X32
RefSeq (mRNA)	NM_001135586; NM_001300894; NM_152409	NM_181278
RefSeq (protein)	NP_001129058; NP_001287823; NP_689622	NP_851795
Location (UCSC)	Chr 5: 134.85 – 134.86 Mb	Chr 13: 55.84 – 55.85 Mb
PubMed search
- Wikidata
View/Edit Human	View/Edit Mouse

C5orf24 (chromosome 5 open reading frame 24) is a protein encoded by the C5orf24 gene (5q31.1) in humans. C5orf24 is primarily localized to the nucleus and is highly conserved with orthologs in mammals, birds, reptiles, amphibians, and fish.

== Gene ==
Human C5orf24 is a protein-coding gene 26,133 base pairs long (chr5:134,833,603-134,859,735) composed of two exons and one intron at locus 5q31.1 oriented on the plus strand. Alternate names for the gene are FLJ37562 and LOC134553. Genes neighboring C5orf24 include DDX46, RPL34P13, and TXNDC15. Some transcription factors predicted to bind to conserved sites on the promoter region (GXP_7545710) are NRF1, E2F, ZF5, and AHR.

== Transcripts ==
Transcript Variant	Length (nt)	Protein Isoform	Length (aa)
1 (NM_001135586.1)	5083	1 (NP_001129058.1)	188
2 (NM_152409.3)	4896	1 (NP_689622.2)	188
3 (NM_001300894.2)	3054	2 (NP_001287823.1)	155

The human C5orf24 gene has three mRNA transcript variants. Both transcript variant 1 and 2 encode protein isoform 1 which is 188 amino acids in length. Transcript variant 1 is the longest and highest quality transcript (5083 nucleotides) with transcript variant 2 (4896 nucleotides) having a smaller 5' UTR region. Transcript variant 3 lacks an internal segment resulting in an alternate translational stop codon making it is the shortest variant (3054 nucleotides) encoding the smaller protein isoform 2 which is 155 amino acids in length.

== Protein ==
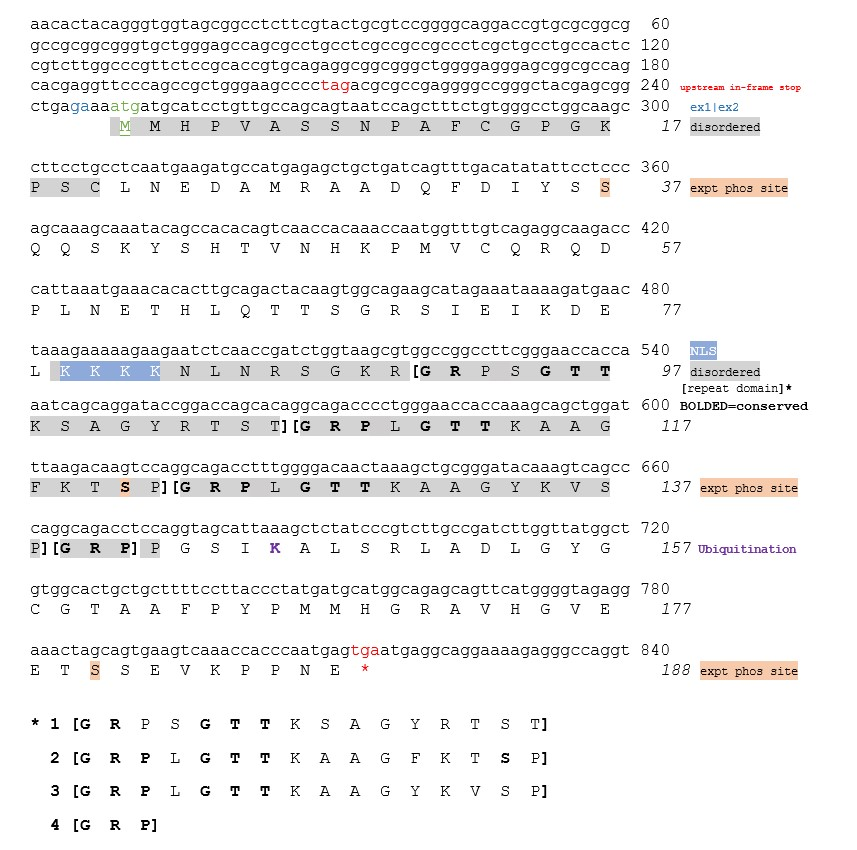
Conceptual translation of the protein-coding region of the C5orf24 mRNA transcript variant 1 (NM_001135586.1) aligned with the corresponding protein sequence (NP_001129058.1).

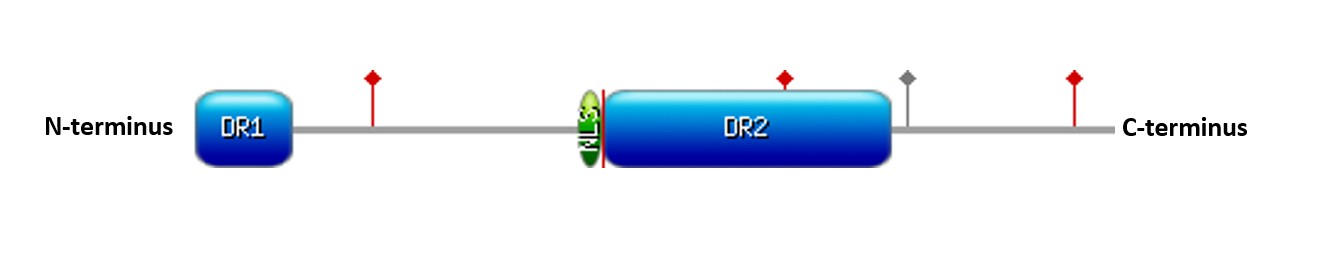
C5orf24 protein isoform 1 cartoon including two disordered regions DR1 & DR2 (blue), nuclear localization signal (green), experimental phosphorylation sites (red), and a ubiquitination site (grey).

Isoform 1 of the UPF0461 protein C5orf24 is 188 amino acids long encoded by exon 2. It contains two disordered regions at the amino acid positions 1-20 and 79-142, respectively. The second disordered region contains a series of internal repeats. The human precursor protein is predicted to be 20.1 kDa with an isoelectric point of approximately 10. Immunoblotting demonstrated the experimental molecular-weight to be about 25 kDa. Three experimental phosphorylation sites have been reported at Ser37, Ser121, and Ser180 along with evidence for a ubiquitination site at Lys146. A conserved nuclear localization signal at amino acid positions 79 – 83 (KKKK) was corroborated by immunofluorescence experiments using anti-C5orf24 antibodies depicting localization to the nucleoplasm. Affinity chromatography and anti tag coimmunoprecipitation experiments showed C5orf24 likely interacts with multiple other proteins including STK11, CAB39, LYK5, PKNOX1, and PBX1.

== Evolutionary history ==
=== Orthologs ===
The C5orf24 protein is not present in plants or fungus but orthologs have been found in mammals, birds, reptiles, amphibians, as well as bony fish (Osteichthyes) and cartilaginous fish (Chondrichthyes). There is evidence for an orthologous domain in jawless fishes (Agnatha) and invertebrates. Comparison of m values (corrected rate of divergence) between C5orf24 (NP_001129058.1), Cytochrome c (NP_061820.1) which has a slow rate of evolution, and Fibrinogen alpha (NP_000499.1) which has a fast rate of evolution demonstrated this protein evolved at fairly slow rate especially when fish sequences are excluded.

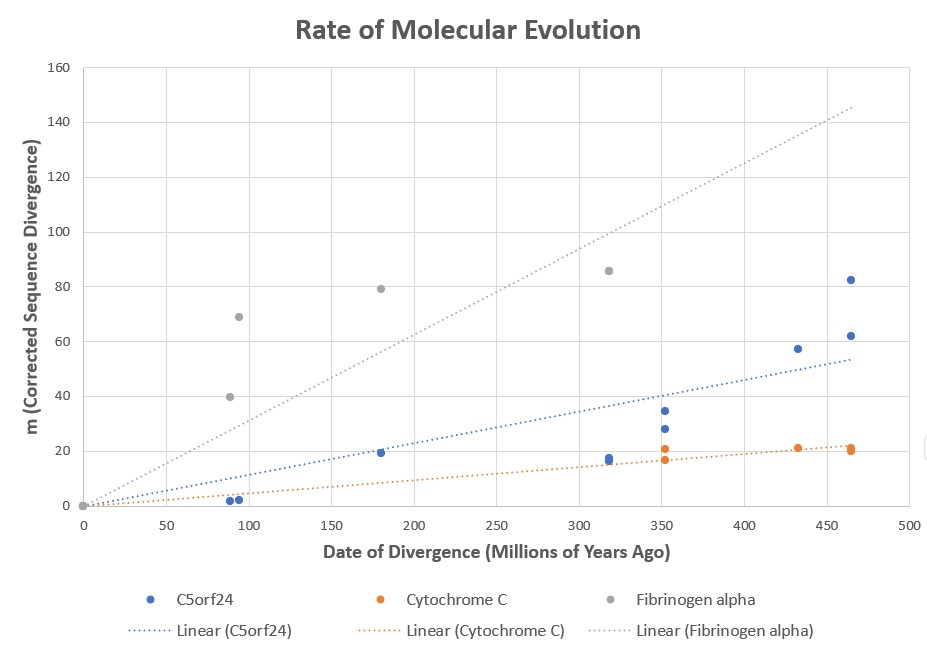
Rate of Molecular Evolution (m vs. Date of Divergence in Millions of Years Ago) of the C5orf24 protein (NP_001129058.1) compared to Cytochrome C (NP_061820.1) and Fibrinogen Alpha (NP_000499.1).

C5orf24	Scientific name	Common name	Taxonomic group	Median Date of Divergence (MYA)	Accession number	Sequence length (aa)	Query Cover	Sequence identity
Mammals	Homo sapiens	Human	Primates	0	NP_001129058.1	188	100%	100%
Mammals	Cavia porcellus	Guinea Pig	Rodentia	89	XP_005005246.1	188	100%	98.4%
Mammals	Ursus maritimus	Polar Bear	Carnivora	94	XP_008689817.1	188	100%	97.9%
Mammals	Trichechus manatus latirostris	Florida Manatee	Sirenia	102	XP_004384765.1	188	100%	95.7%
Mammals	Ornithorhynchus anatinus	Platypus	Monotremata	180	XP_007669207.1	188	100%	82.4%
Birds	Calypte anna	Anna's Hummingbird	Apodiformes	318	XP_030314921.1	188	100%	86.2%
Birds	Strigops habroptila	Kākāpō	Psittaciformes	318	XP_030360294.1	188	100%	85.1%
Reptiles	Pelodiscus sinensis	Chinese Softshell Turtle	Testudines	318	XP_006116108.1	188	100%	85.1%
Reptiles	Python bivittatus	Burmese python	Squamata	318	XP_007421938.1	188	100%	78.7%
Amphibians	Rhinatrema bivittatum	Two-Lined Caecilian	Gymnophiona	352	XP_029439506.1	188	100%	75.5%
Amphibians	Xenopus tropicalis	Tropical Clawed Frog	Anura	352	NP_001072358.1	186	100%	70.7%
Fishes	Esox Lucius	Northern Pike	Osteichtyes	433	XP_019903474.2	204	100%	56.5%
Fishes	Scyliorhinus canicular	Small-Spotted Catshark	Chondrichthyes	465	XP_038651786.1	193	96%	53.8%

=== Paralogs ===
The C5orf24 gene has no paralogs.

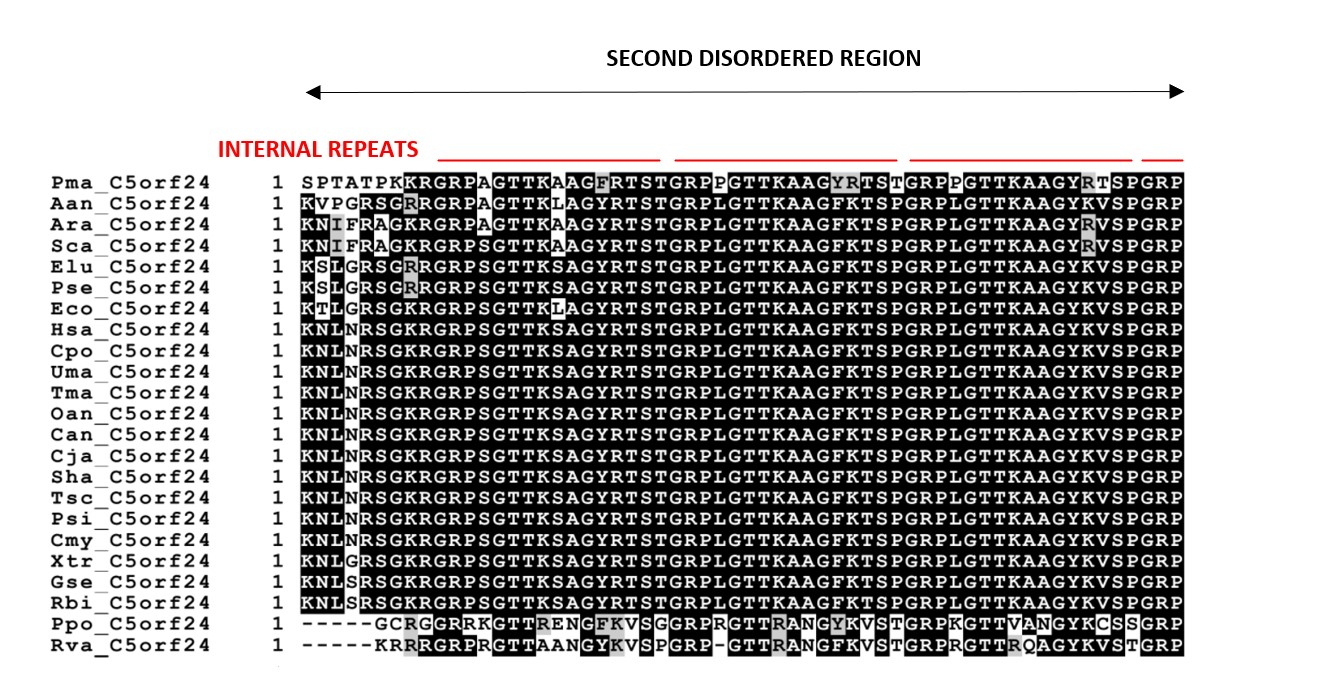
Multiple sequence alignment of the highly conserved C5orf24 protein region containing internal repeats in mammals, birds, reptiles, amphibians, fish, and invertebrates.

=== Conservation ===
Multiple sequence alignments revealed the C5orf24 protein has been highly conserved and likely originated in cartilaginous fishes nearly 465 million years ago. A series of internal repeats in the second disordered region were additionally identified in proteins found within jawless fishes and invertebrates, suggesting an orthologous domain began even further back in evolutionary history.

== Clinical significance ==
=== Expression ===
C5orf24 is ubiquitously expressed with limited tissue variability. Microarray-assessed tissue expression patterns show C5orf24 levels decreasing in pro-inflammatory environments such as in patients with tibial muscular dystrophy and children with obesity.

=== Genotype-phenotype correlations ===
While this gene has yet to be well understood by the scientific community, some genotype-phenotype correlations have been established including the upregulation of C5orf24 in individuals with PTSD and downregulation in those with improved symptoms, a linear correlation between methylation levels of C5orf24 GC sites to negative affect scores in drug addicts, as well as GWAS studies demonstrating SNPs in C5orf24 to be associated with Parkinson's disease in the Chinese Han population and Crohn's disease.
