= Mouse models of breast cancer metastasis =

Cancer research

Breast cancer metastatic mouse models are experimental approaches in which mice are genetically manipulated to develop a mammary tumor leading to distant focal lesions of mammary epithelium created by metastasis. Mammary cancers in mice can be caused by genetic mutations that have been identified in human cancer. This means models can be generated based upon molecular lesions consistent with the human disease.

== Breast cancer metastasis ==
Metastasis is a process of migration of tumour cells from the primary cancer site to a distant location where the cancer cells form secondary tumors. Metastatic breast cancer represents the most devastating attribute of cancer and it is considered an advanced-stage event. Human breast cancer metastasizes to multiple distant organs such as the brain, lungs, bones and liver.

=== Genetic diversity between primary and metastatic tumor ===
The classical theory developed in the early 70's anticipated that metastasis is due to genetically determined subpopulations in primary tumours. The genetic variance between metastatic foci is significant for only particular locus and within specific cell populations or only one-cell population shows differences and some loci are divergent only in one cell subpopulation. This explains the concept of tumour heterogeneity and the order of genetic events during tumor evolution. Many of the genes driving the growth at primary site can determine the dissemination and colonization at the ectopic site. Breast cancer is consensually considered genetically and clinically as a heterogeneous disease, in that it reflects the heterogeneity of the normal breast tissue at its origin17873350. A number of discrete genetic events have to occur in order to enable individual tumor cells that have the capacity to grow at an ectopic site. The metastatic progression depends on the regulation of developmental programs and environmental events. The metastatic potential of sub populations within mouse mammary cells is now considered as relatively an early event and dissemination occurs at the same time of pre invasive or micro-invasive lesions. The genetic profiles of primary and metastatic lesions in breast carcinomas show a large extent of clonal pertinence between lesions. There are various patterns of prevalence of genetic mutations in the genomes of primary breast tumour and its metastases. It also confirms the genetic heterogeneity between the primary neoplasm of breast cancer patients and their respective metastases.

=== Genes involved in organ specific metastasis ===
Breast cancer phenotypes periodically express genes in metastasis that are indispensable for the metastatic process. Metastatic diversity is mediated by the activation of genes that act as coupling to organ-specific growth. The growth of lesions at the ectopic site depends on multiple complex interactions between metastatic cells and host homeostatic mechanisms. Lethal protein-protein interactions at the metastatic site aid the survival of adapted cells.

== Generating mouse models of breast cancer ==
Targeted expression of oncogenes in mouse mammary epithelial cells is a way of modeling human breast cancer. Mutation or over expression of oncogenes can be kept under controlled expression in a very specific cellular context rather than throughout the organism. Another way to model human breast cancer is done through the targeted inhibition of a tumor suppressor gene.

=== Mice in genetic research ===
- In 1909, Clarence C. Little developed the first inbred strain, the DBA (Dilute, brown non-Agouti) mouse.
- In 1915, N.M Haldane identified first linkage in mouse between Albino mice and pink eye dilution on chromosome seven.
- In 1921, C57BL became one of the most widely used mice in genetics and was the first strain to have its genome sequenced.
- In 1982, Palmiter and Brinster implanted a foreign gene into fertilized egg, finally generating the first transgenic mice genetically engineered to express dominant oncogenes.
- In 1982, the stimulation of expression from the MMTV-LTR (Mouse mammary tumor virus-Long terminal repeat) was done by multiple rounds of pregnancy and lactation to evaluate the relevance of a cellular proto-oncogene, c-myc.

=== Human and mouse: a genomic comparison ===
Genetic studies of common diseases in humans suffer significant limitations for practical and ethical reasons. Human cell lines can be used to model disease but it is difficult to study processes at the tissue level, within an organ or across the entire body. Mice can be a good representation of diseases in humans because:

- There are close similarities of physiology, development and cell biology between mice and humans.
- Humans and mice both have around 30,000 protein-coding genes. The number of mouse genes without a corresponding human homologue is less than 1%.
- 90% of the human and mouse genomes are syntenic.
- 40% of both human and mouse genomes can be aligned at the nucleotide level.
- Mice have relatively short gestation periods.
- Mice take a brief time to reach sexual maturity.
- Mice have large litter sizes.
- The availability of hundreds of mutations affecting almost every tissue and aspect of development.

Mice may not be an ideal model for breast cancer. This is mainly due to the lack of precision in many of the models. When looking at metastasis, it is difficult to determine the precise location as well as its frequency. Another issue revolves around the epithelial sub types and the inability to specifically target them when targeting a mutation. An example of this would be determining the development of tumors in K14-Cre BRCA2 mice. In a standard case, the excision of BRCA2 resulted in no tumorigenesis, but if p53 was mutated and inactivated, tumorigenesis would occur. Therefore, there is not a definitive answer in terms of the origin of the tumor, due to the extra mutation in p53.

=== Metastatic mouse mammary carcinoma cell lines ===
Various mouse mammary carcinoma cell lines, like 4T1 and TS/A, are metastatic in syngeneic immunocompetent mice and can be used to identify genes and pathways involved in the metastatic process.

=== Simple tumor transplantation models ===
Transplantation of tumor cells into immunodeficient mice is a tool to study breast cancer and its metastatic effects. The transplantation occurs as either allotransplants or xenographic transplants. Commonly, human cells are inoculated in an immunocompromised murine recipient. Inoculating cells through intra ductal transplantations, by cleared mammary fat pad injections or by transplantations into the tail vein. Different organs can be seeded with breast cancer cells depending on the route of injection

- Cardiac injection: Bone
- Tail vein injection: Lung
- Splenic injection: Liver
- Carotid artery Injection: Brain

=== Tumor tissue transplant models ===
The specific immunodeficient mice that were used were the NOD/SCID mouse (non-obese diabetic/severe conditional immunodeficient). These mutations allow for the integration of new xenograft tissue. The mouse must first have their mammary fat pads humanized by injecting human telemorase-immortalized human mammary stromal fibroblasts(RMF/EG fibroblasts) into the mammary fat pads. Without this injection, the human mammary epithelial cells en-grafted onto the pad are unable to colonize and grow. The RMF/EG fibroblast must then be irradiated to allow the expression of key proteins and growth factors. After 4 weeks of development, the newly en-grafted human mammary epithelial cells expanded within the fat pad.

=== Genetically engineered mice to study metastasis ===
Genetically engineered mice are constructed to model human phenotypes and pathologies. Mutant mice may include transgenes using different delivery methods:

- The use of bacteria-derived tetracycline-inducible system permitting the switching on or off (Tet-On/Tet-Off system)
- Targeted mutations by knock in gene and knock out sequence by using Cre-Lox recombination system
- Introduction of retro viral mutations
- Introduction of chemically induced mutations

==== Transgenic mouse models of breast cancer ====
The mice undergoing the process of transgenesis are known as transgenic mice. A basic transgene has a promoter region, Protein coding sequence, Intron and a stop codon. Mouse mammary tumor virus (MMTV), is a retro virus that has been a known promoter to cause breast tumors once activated. MMTV is a heritable somatic mutagen whose target range is limited. It harbors a regulatory DNA sequence called the long terminal repeat (LTR), which promotes steroid-hormone-inducible transcription. Tumorigenesis that was induced by the mouse mammary tumor virus can also be done by integration of the viral genome. The sites of integration have been known to be critical genes for cellular regulation. Whey acidic protein (WAP), is another common promoter used to generate mouse mammary cancer models. For a list of other mammary gland specific promoters and mouse models see.

Schematic representation of breast cancer metastatic study models

==== MMTV-PyMT ====
MMTV-PyMT is the model of breast cancer metastasis, in which MMTV-LTR is used to drive the expression of mammary gland specific polyomavirus middle T-antigen, leading to a rapid development of highly metastatic tumors. MMTV-PyMT is the most commonly used model for the study of mammary tumor progression and metastasis. MMTV-PyMT mice are then crossed bred with other genetically modified mice to generate various types of breast cancer models, including:

- PI3K/Akt signalling in metastasis can be demonstrated in MMTV-PyMT; Akt1−/− mice.
- Chemoattractive paracrine loop of colony-stimulating factor-1 (CSF-1) and EGF ligands between tumor-associated macrophages (TAMs) and tumor cells, and the lung metastasis can be studied by crossing MMTV-PyMT mice with Csf-1−/− mice.
- The role of an innate and adaptive immune response to assist metastasis can be studied in MMTV-PyMT; Rag1−/− mice in which CD4+ T cells are selectively lost. Interleukin-4 (IL4) lacking model of MMTV-PyMT; IL4−/− mice.
- Role of the adhesion molecule CD44 in lung metastasis.
- Conditional ablation in MMTV-PyMT breast cancer cells has been done to reveal pro-metastatic actions of the angiogenic factors, Vascular endothelial growth factor A (VEGF-A).
- The role of autocrine transforming growth factor beta 1(TGF-β1) signaling on motility and survival in PymT cells derived from an MMTV-PymT mouse mammary cancer.
- Others are MMTV-PyMT; uPA-/- and MMTV-PyMT; MEKK1-/-.

==== MMTV-HER2/neu ====
The MMTV-LTR can also be used to promote receptor tyrosine-protein kinase ErbB2 to transform the mouse mammary epithelium. ErbB2 is an oncogene amplified and overexpressed in around 20% of human breast cancers. The mice harbouring this oncogene develop multifocal adenocarcinomas with lung metastases at about 15 weeks after pregnancy. To create a more accurate representation of HER2 gene mutations, researchers have fused the mouse gene containing neu and a rat gene containing neu. This addresses the issue in terms of modeling the amplification of HER2 in mice development. In the non-fused mouse, the mammary gland would revert to a near virgin, but with this addition the mammary gland maintained the developed function.

==== Bi-transgenic models ====
Mouse models having two transgenes are called bi transgenic. To check the cooperation of two oncogenes, Timothy A Stewart and group made the first bi-transgenic mouse models in 1987, MMTV-Myc and MMTV- Ras mice were crossed with a resulting acceleration in tumorigenesis. Expression of TGFβ in the breast cancer cells of MMTV-ErbB2; MMTV-TGFβ double-transgenic mice can induce higher levels of circulating tumor cells and lung metastasis. Ras gene can be combined with rtTA (reverse tetracycline transactivator) to generate bi-transgenic inducible mouse model through tetracycline-controlled transcriptional activation e.g. mice carrying TetO-KrasG12D (TOR) and MMTV-rtTA (MTB), comes with the transgene expressing the reverse tetracycline transactivator (rtTA) in mammary epithelial cells. Bi-transgenic models have also been generated by combining an oncogene with the knockout of a tumor suppressor gene. Paola Marignani and colleagues crossed Stk11^{fl/fl} mice with an activated ErbB2/Neu-MMTV-Cre (NIC) model, producing LKB1-deficient, ErbB2-driven tumors with reduced latency and altered metabolic pathways.

==== Tri-transgenic models ====
Tri-transgenic mouse models constitute of more than two genes. Multiple combinations and genetic modifications are made in such a way that either one or all the genes are put into a continuously expressed status, or in a controlled fashion to activate them at different time points. For example, TOM (TetO-myc); TOR; MTB mice, where both the myc (M) and ras (R) genes are under the control of tetracycline operators. They can also both be activated or deactivated by adding doxycycline. Other combinations in this respect are TOM; Kras; MTB, where myc can be induced and uninduced at various time points while Kras is in continuous expressed state, and myc; TOR; MTB model is vice versa.

== Applications of genetically modified mice to study metastasis ==
Metastatic cascade can be studied by keeping the gene activation under control or by adding a reporter gene e.g. Beta actin GFP (Green fluorescent protein) or RFP (Red fluorescent protein).

=== Identification of genes that regulate metastasis ===
By knocking in/knocking out specific genes by homologous recombination, the extent of metastasis can be measured and new target genes identification can be achieved e.g. a gene that consistently regulates metastatic behavior of cancer cells is TGF-β1. Acute ablation of TGF-β signaling in MMTV-PyMT mammary tumor cells leads to a five-fold increase in lung metastasis. Certain enhancer regions can also be analyzed and can be determined to be a crucial part of cell proliferation e.g. an enhancing region that is associated with a cancer critical gene p53 which was determined via CRISPR-Cas9.

=== Lineage tracing in metastasis models ===
The quantitative lineage-tracing strategies have proven to be successful in resolving cell fates in normal epithelial tissues either using tissue –specific or stem-cell-specific transgenes. To conduct an inducible lineage-tracing experiment two components must be engineered into the mouse genome: a switch and a reporter. The switch is commonly a drug-regulated form of the bacterial enzyme Cre-recombinase. This enzyme recognizes specific sequences, called LoxP sites. Proteins that are capable of enhancing the identification of labeled cells or a specific population in unlabelled cells are encoded by the reporter transgenes. After harvesting all the ten mouse mammary glands from the transgenic mice, single cell suspension is usually made and transplanted either in tail vein of non transgenic recipient mice or in cleared fat pad of non-transgenic mice repopulating the mammary fat pad. These cells are then followed in the blood stream, lungs, bone marrow and liver to look for the favorable site of metastasis.these transgenic cells can be traced according to their special features of either fluorescence or induced by placing the recipients on doxycycline food.

=== Circulating tumor cells ===
Another tool to study breast cancer metastasis is to look for circulating tumor cells in transgenic mice e.g. MMTV-PyMT mice can respond to various therapies in shedding tumor cells in the blood leading to lung metastasis. Not only in blood but cells can be detected in bone marrow e.g. cytokeratin-positive cells in the bone marrow of MMTV-pyMT and MMTV-Neu transgenic mice were identified but not in the wild type controls.

=== Limitations ===
In the absence of specific markers for mammary cells, models with genetic marking of tumor cells gives the best experimental advantage, however the low volume of peripheral blood that can be obtained from live animals limits the application of this technique.

== In vivo imaging of metastatic mouse models ==
Transgenic mouse models can be imaged by various non-invasive techniques.

Bio luminescence imaging

=== Bioluminescence imaging ===
Bioluminescence imaging relies on the detection of light produced by the enzymatic oxidation of an exogenous substrate. The substrate luciferin, is oxidized to oxyluciferin in the presence of luciferase and emits light, which can be detected using an IVIS system such as a Xenogen machine. Dissociated mammary cells from MMTV-PyMT: IRES: Luc; MTB (Internal ribosome entry site: Luciferin) animals (which were not exposed to doxycycline) can be injected into the lateral tail veins of immunodeficient mice on a doxycycline-free diet. No bioluminescence signal will be observed in the lungs of recipient mice until they are given doxycycline food. Bioluminescence can then be detected in the chest within 2 weeks of the start of doxycycline exposure. Luciferase is injected just before taking the images.

=== Fluorescent imaging ===
Intravital microscopy with multi photon excitation is a technique to visualize genetically engineered cells directly in vivo. Multi step metastatic cascades can be visualized by labelling with unique fluorescent colour under fluorescence microscope.

=== Radioisotopic imaging ===
Positron emission tomography (PET), single photon emission computed tomography (SPECT) and computed tomography (CT) have been used to compare the efficiency of these in vivo imaging for detecting lesions at an early stage and to evaluate the response to chemotherapy.

=== MRI Imaging ===
Magnetic resonance imaging requires the use of nano-particles(liposomes) and an MRI contrast agent called gadolinium. The particles were then placed in vesicles via a polycarbonate membrane filter. The nano-particles are injected into the metastases evolved mice, and left there for twenty-four hours. These mice are then scanned, and in the imaging software there are accumulations of these particles in certain areas where cells have metastasized.

== See also ==
- Ensembl genome database of model organisms
- Fate mapping
- Firefly luciferin
- Gene targeting
- Gene trapping
- Genetic recombination
- History of model organisms
- Homologous recombination
- Recombinase-mediated cassette exchange
- Site-specific recombinase technology
