= Crystal Bowersox =

American singer-songwriter and actress (born 1985)

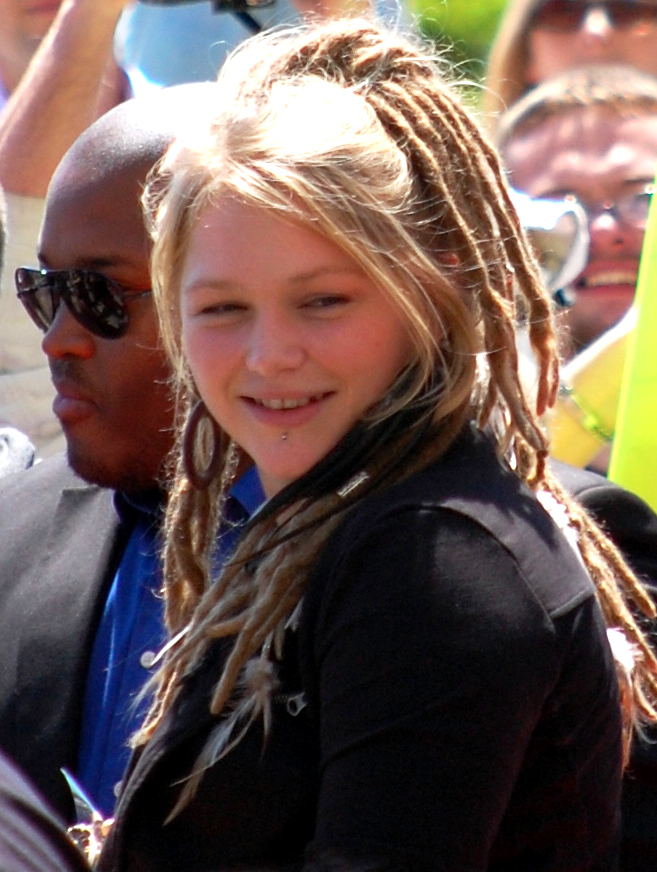
- Bowersox in 2010

Background information
- Born: Crystal Lynn Bowersox; August 4, 1985 (age 41); Elliston, Ohio, U.S.
- Genres: Rock; indie folk; acoustic; blues; gospel; soul; blues rock; country
- Occupations: Singer; songwriter; actress
- Instruments: Vocals; guitar; harmonica
- Years active: 2010–present
- Labels: Jive; 19 (2010–2011); Shanachie (2012–2013); Mamasox (2013–present)
- Website: crystalbowersox.com

Crystal Lynn Bowersox (born August 4, 1985) is an American singer, songwriter and actress who was the runner-up on the ninth season of American Idol. She was the first female finalist in three years.

Bowersox's debut album, Farmer's Daughter, was released on December 14, 2010 by Jive Records. Bowersox released her second album, All That for This, on March 26, 2013.

== Early life ==
Bowersox and her twin brother, Karl, were born in Elliston, Ohio to Kelly Lynn Bowersox (née Bowlander) and William Lester Bowersox. Her parents divorced when she was two years old. At age six, Bowersox was diagnosed with type 1 diabetes. She attended Oak Harbor High School in Oak Harbor, Ohio and later attended the Toledo School for the Arts in Toledo, Ohio. She was in choir and played flute in the school marching band. Bowersox performed her first professional gig at the age of 10. She appeared at local bars in Toledo, most popularly Papa's Tavern, and The Village Idiot in Maumee, Ohio.

At the age of seventeen, she moved to Chicago, where she played music as a busker at train stations, including the Washington and Lake Redline stops. She frequented open mics, such as the In One Ear show at the Heartland Cafe, and Uncommon Ground Clark and Grace, and Devon locations. She also played extensively in Chicago's Lakeview neighborhood.

In 2006, the Chicago Department of Cultural Affairs chose Bowersox to represent Chicago folk musicians in the Sister Cities program "Experience Chicago", held in Birmingham. In 2007, Bowersox traveled internationally on an independent small cafe tour, including Memphis, Oaxaca City, Ankara and Istanbul. She gave birth to a son, Anthony Levi Mason, in 2009; according to Bowersox, his father left her six weeks into her pregnancy.

== American Idol ==
Bowersox auditioned for American Idol in Chicago, Illinois. She sang "Piece of My Heart". Guest judge Shania Twain commented that she had a "raw, natural talent."

On March 2, 2010, Bowersox was hospitalized due to Diabetic ketoacidosis (DKA) from type 1 diabetes, forcing a last minute switch in scheduling to give her extra time to recuperate. Bowersox confirmed the illness on the May 19, 2010 results show during an interview with host Ryan Seacrest. The men competed that day instead of the women. She sang the next day and impressed all of the judges.

The following week, her strong performance prompted Simon Cowell to state, "Right now, you are the one everyone has to beat."

After Siobhan Magnus's elimination from the top 6 of American Idol, Bowersox became the last remaining female contestant in the competition.

Bowersox was the first female contestant to make it to the finale since Jordin Sparks won the title in 2007. She is also the first contestant in American Idol history to have one of their original songs played on the show, or at least during their hometown package. Crystal's original song "Holy Toledo" was played on the May 19 Top 3 Results show as the background music for her homecoming package - when she returned to Toledo, Ohio and Elliston, Ohio the previous weekend - and segued into her live performance of the same song at "Bowerstock".

During her time on Idol, Bowersox dated Tony Kusian, but the couple broke up just hours before the Idol finale.

On the final performance day, in Simon Cowell's final critique on American Idol, he called her performance of "Up to the Mountain" "outstanding" and "by far, the best performance and song of the night".

On May 26, 2010, Bowersox was named runner-up to winner Lee DeWyze. She announced that after her Idol career, she wants to bring more awareness to type 1 diabetes.

Bowersox is the third Idol Runner-Up (preceded by Clay Aiken and David Archuleta) to never be in the Bottom 3 or Bottom 2.

=== Performances ===
Episode	Theme	Song choice	Original recording artist	Order #	Result
Audition	Auditioner's Choice	"Piece of My Heart"	Erma Franklin	N/A	Advanced
Hollywood Week	First Solo	"(You Make Me Feel Like) A Natural Woman"	Aretha Franklin	N/A	Advanced
Hollywood Week	Group Round	"Get Ready"	The Temptations	N/A	Advanced
Hollywood Week	Second Solo	"If It Makes You Happy"	Sheryl Crow	N/A	Advanced
Top 24 (12 Women)	Billboard Hot 100 Hits	"Hand in My Pocket"	Alanis Morissette	11	Safe
Top 20 (10 Women)	Billboard Hot 100 Hits	"Long as I Can See the Light"	Creedence Clearwater Revival	1	Safe
Top 16 (8 Women)	Billboard Hot 100 Hits	"Give Me One Reason"	Tracy Chapman	7	Safe
Top 12	The Rolling Stones	"You Can't Always Get What You Want"	The Rolling Stones	12	Safe
Top 11	Billboard Number 1 Hits	"Me and Bobby McGee"	Roger Miller	5	Safe
Top 10	R&B/Soul	"Midnight Train to Georgia"	Cissy Houston	9	Safe
Top 9	Lennon–McCartney	"Come Together"	The Beatles	5	Safe
Top 9^{1}	Elvis Presley	"Saved"	LaVern Baker	1	Safe
Top 7	Inspirational	"People Get Ready"	The Impressions	7	Safe
Top 6	Shania Twain	"No One Needs to Know"	Shania Twain	4	Safe
Top 5	Frank Sinatra	"Summer Wind"	Wayne Newton	3	Safe
Top 4	Songs of the Cinema	Duet "Falling Slowly" — Once with Lee DeWyze	Glen Hansard & Markéta Irglová	3	Safe^{2}
Top 4	Songs of the Cinema	Solo "I'm Alright" — Caddyshack	Kenny Loggins	5	Safe^{2}
Top 3	Contestant's Choice	"Come to My Window"	Melissa Etheridge	2	Safe
Top 3	Judges' Choice^{3}	"Maybe I'm Amazed"	Paul McCartney	5	Safe
Top 2	Contestant's Choice	"Me and Bobby McGee"	Roger Miller	2	Runner-up
Top 2	Simon Fuller's Choice	"Black Velvet"	Alannah Myles	4	Runner-up
Top 2	First Single	"Up to the Mountain"	Solomon Burke	6	Runner-up

- ^Note 1 Due to the judges using their one 'save' for Michael Lynche, the Top 9 remained intact for another week.
- ^Note 2 Though Crystal Bowersox was the last contestant announced to be 'safe' and moving on to the Top 3, Ryan Seacrest stressed on the Top 4 Results Night that 'safe' contestants would be announced "in no particular order." Thus, the audience has no way of knowing which of the Top 3 was the second-lowest vote-getter that night after Michael Lynche, who was eliminated.
- ^Note 3 Song selected by Ellen DeGeneres.

== Post-Idol career ==
On May 27, 2010, one day after Bowersox's second place Idol finish, it was announced that she had signed with 19 Entertainment/Jive Records. Her single "Up to the Mountain" has since been released to radio stations and iTunes.

=== 2010–12: Farmer's Daughter ===
Bowersox's debut album, Farmer's Daughter, was released to stores and iTunes on December 14, 2010. Bowersox performed her single "Farmer's Daughter" on The Ellen DeGeneres Show on December 16, 2010.

On October 7, 2011, RCA Music Group announced it was disbanding Jive Records along with Arista Records and J Records. With the shutdown, all other artists previously signed to these three labels would see their future material released under the RCA Records brand. However, Bowersox was not one of the artists who made the move, and was instead left without a record label.

She made her acting debut on a second-season episode of Body of Proof.

An EP of pre-Idol recordings was called Once Upon a Time... was self-released in June 2012.

She was a guest on the Blues Traveler album, Suzie Cracks the Whip, performing vocals with John Popper on the song "I Don't Wanna Go", and appeared with them in concert at their concert of July 4, 2012 at Red Rocks Amphitheatre in Colorado.

=== 2012–present: All That for This ===
In October 2012, Bowersox signed a recording deal with Shanachie Records.

On January 7, 2013, it was confirmed that Bowersox's second studio album, All That for This, would be released March 26, 2013. The album was produced by Steve Berlin of Los Lobos and features Jakob Dylan. Bowersox debuted the first single from the album, "Dead Weight", on On Air with Ryan Seacrest on February 5, 2013. Bowersox told Seacrest, "This song means more to me than even I can completely comprehend."

Bowersox began a headlining tour in support of the album on March 1, 2013. The band Montë Mar was her concert opener, as well as her backing band on dates through March 31, 2013. On March 25, 2013, Bowersox appeared on The Tonight Show with Jay Leno and performed her song "Movin' On" to promote the album. It was announced here that Bowersox will play Patsy Cline in the Broadway production of Always, Patsy Cline. It was announced on June 11, 2013 that Bowersox would be headlining the Lancaster Festival in Lancaster, Ohio on June 27, 2013

== Personal life ==
Bowersox and musician Brian Walker were married on October 10, 2010, at Uncommon Ground Café in Chicago, the restaurant where the couple had met six years earlier while both were performing at Open Mic Night. It was announced on May 6, 2013, that they were ending their marriage.

While appearing on Good Day L.A. to promote her Christmas album on November 26, 2013, Bowersox came out as bisexual. "I have been bisexual as long as I can remember," she said. Bowersox then performed her song "Coming Out For Christmas" which explores the subject matter.

== Discography ==
=== Studio albums ===
Year	Album details	Peak				Certifications
Year	Album details	US	US Rock	US Digital	CAN	Certifications
2010	Farmer's Daughter: Release date: December 14, 2010; Label: Jive/19; Format: CD, digital download	28	2	8	90	US: 205,000
2013	All That for This: Release date: March 26, 2013; Label: Shanachie Records; Format: CD, digital download	71	21	—	—	US: 8,000
2017	Alive: Release date: 2017; Label: Mamasox Inc.; Format: CD, digital download					
2022	HitchHiker: Release date: 2022; Label: Mamasox Inc.; Format: CD, digital download					

=== Digital albums ===
Year	Album	Peak		Sales
Year	Album	US Heat	US Indie	Sales
2010	Season 9 Favorite Performances: Release date: May 2010; Label: 19; Format: digital download	6	38	US: 5,000
"—" denotes releases that did not chart

=== Extended plays ===
List of EPs with relevant details
Year	Title	EP details
2012	Once Upon a Time...	Released: May 29, 2012; Label: self-release; Format: Digital download, CD
2014	Promises	Release date: September 23, 2014; Label: Mamasox; Format: CD, digital download

=== Singles ===
Year	Single	Peak		Album
Year	Single	US	CAN	Album
2010	"Up to the Mountain"	57	47	Non-album single
2010	"Farmer's Daughter"	—	73	Farmer's Daughter
2013	"Movin' On"	—	—	All That for This
2013	"Dead Weight"	—	—	All That for This
2013	"Coming Out for Christmas"	—	—	Non-album single
"—" denotes releases that did not chart

=== Digital singles ===
Year	Single	Peak		Album
Year	Single	US	CAN	Album
2010	"Falling Slowly" (with Lee DeWyze)	66	70	non-album single
"—" denotes releases that did not chart

== Music videos ==
Year	Song	Director(s)/Production
2010	"Farmer's Daughter"	Meiert Avis
2011	"Mine All Mine"	JIVE Records
2013	"Dead Weight"	Tiger Tiger
2017	"Until Then"	Steven Rosenfeld
2019	"The Stuff"	—N/a
2020	"Courage To Be Kind"	Billy Harvey
2021	"The Storm"	Billy Harvey

== Filmography ==
=== Television ===
Year	Title	Role	Notes
2011	Body of Proof	Zoe Brant	Episode: "Second Chances"

=== Theatre ===
Year	Title	Role	Notes	Ref.
2014	Always, Patsy Cline	Patsy Cline	Broadway	
2018	Play It by Heart	Jamie Lynn	Amas Musical Theatre	
2019	Trauma Queen	Herself	The Franklin Theatre	

== Awards and nominations ==
Year	Presenter	Award	Result
2010	Teen Choice Awards	Female Reality/Variety Star	Nominated
