= Advanced Technician in Aviation non civil servant =

In France, the training of the Technicien supérieur de l'aviation (civilian) (TSA civilian, in English Advanced Technician in Aviation non civil servant) is performed by the École nationale de l'aviation civile (French civil aviation university).

== History ==
The TSA civilian training is created in addition to the one of Technicien supérieur des études et de l'exploitation de l'aviation civile available since 1962.

== Application ==
The competitive examination is organized each year for students holder of a Baccalauréat. 5 seats are available. After the application process, students are trained during two years at the École nationale de l'aviation civile (French civil aviation university) of Toulouse.

== Job ==
The TSA civilians can have different jobs in airports, airlines or manufacturers including:

- Operational activities,
- Operation of the airport area (use of airport runways, aircraft operating conditions),
- Work in an operational department (weight and balance, flight planning, route calculation, fuel calculation), or a ground handling (passengers, cargo, etc..).

== Training ==
The initial training of the Technicien supérieur des études et de l'exploitation de l'aviation civile was reformed in 2011. It is now called TSA for Technicien supérieur de l'aviation and include, since 2011, two curriculum:

- TSA civilian training: students are admitted after a competitive examination or by Validation des Acquis de l'Experience for a two-years training.
- TSEEAC: after being admitted with the same competitive examination as the TSA civilian, they attend the same two years course before a one year complementary training (in a dual education system) at the Directorate General for Civil Aviation.

== Bibliography ==
- Ariane Gilotte, Jean-Philippe Husson and Cyril Lazerge, 50 ans d'Énac au service de l'aviation, Édition S.E.E.P.P, 1999

== See also ==
- Technicien supérieur de l'aviation
- Technicien supérieur des études et de l'exploitation de l'aviation civile
