= Technicien supérieur des études et de l'exploitation de l'aviation civile =

In France, the corps of Technicien supérieur des études et de l'exploitation de l'aviation civile (TSEEAC, in English Civil aviation opérations Technicians) of the Directorate General for Civil Aviation (DGAC) is a B-class job within the Ministry of Ecology, Sustainable Development, Transport and Housing.

== Enrollment ==
The TSEEAC competitive examination is open to individuals who have their Baccalauréat. Between about 30 and 60 entries may be available each year. After the enrollment, students are trained during three years at the École nationale de l'aviation civile (French civil aviation university) of Toulouse.

== Career ==
This corps has five grades (in descending order):

- TSEEAC exceptional class: 5 levels.
- TSEEAC main class: 8 levels.
- TSEEAC normal class: 11 levels.
- TSEEAC internship: 1 level.
- TSEEAC student: 1 level.

The TSEEAC, under certain conditions, can be assigned to two functional positions of management:

- Cadre Technique de l'Aviation Civile (CTAC) (Technical middle management of civil aviation): 8 levels.
- Responsable Technique de l'Aviation Civile (RTAC) (Technical manager of civil aviation): 5 levels.

There are also possibilities to move to another corps of the DGAC like air traffic controllers, air traffic safety electronics personnel or Ingénieur des études et de l'exploitation de l'aviation civile. They should go for one or two years at ENAC to perform a complementary training.

== Job ==
TSEEAC personnel can do many jobs at the DGAC, including: technical assistant, technical operating controller (SAFA programme), aerodrome air traffic controller, ramp manager (at Paris-Charles de Gaulle Airport), aeronautical information operator, officer of the regional offices of information and assistance in flight (BRIA), and investigation assistant (BEA).

== Training ==
In 2010, a reform of TSEEAC initial training was initiated. It is now called TSA "Technicien supérieur de l'aviation" and has, since 2011, two curricula:

- TSA civils training: admits by a competitive examination or by Validation des Acquis de l'Experience, they perform a two-year training before graduation.
- TSEEAC also called TSA fonctionnaires (TSA civil servants), admits by a competitive examination, they perform the same training as the TSA civils during two years. After this, they are integrated into the TSEEAC corps and perform a one-year complementary dual education system training at the DGAC.

== History ==
The corps of TSEEAC has had several name changes since the 1960s:

- 1962 - TNA: Technicien de la Navigation Aérienne (Air navigation Technician) including the operations air traffic controller and the air traffic safety electronics personnel.
- 1964 - division of the corps: the corps of the TNA remains, despite the departure of air traffic controllers and electricians, respectively to the new corps of "Officiers Contrôleurs de la Circulation Aérienne" (OCCA) - became air traffic controller after that - without those of electricians - became Air Traffic Safety Electronics Personnel.
- 1975 - TAC: Techniciens de l'Aviation Civile (Civil aviation technicians).
- 1993 - TEEAC: Technicien des Etudes et d'Exploitation de l'Aviation Civile.
- 2000 - TSEEAC: Technicien Supérieur des Etudes et d'Exploitation de l'Aviation Civile.
- 2011 - The initial training at ENAC of TSEEAC is opened to non civil servant and renamed TSA (Technicien supérieur de l'aviation).

== Decree ==
Décret n°93-622 du 27 mars 1993 concerning the corps of techniciens supérieurs des études et de l'exploitation de l'aviation civile.

== See also ==
- French Civil Service
- Technicien supérieur de l'aviation (TSA)
- Technicien Supérieur de l'Aviation (civilian) (TSA civilian)

== Bibliography ==
- Ariane Gilotte, Jean-Philippe Husson et Cyril Lazerge, 50 ans d'Énac au service de l'aviation, Édition S.E.E.P.P, 1999
