= Strad =

Strad may refer to:

- Stradivarius, a stringed instrument
- Steradian, the measurement of solid angles
- The Strad, a classical music magazine
- "Strad", by C418 from Minecraft - Volume Beta, 2013
- STRAD, also known as Protein kinase LYK5
