= Farmer's Daughter (album) =

Studio album by Crystal Bowersox
- Released: December 14, 2010
- Recorded: June–October 2010
- Genres: Folk rock; country
- Length: 42:34
- Labels: Jive; 19
- Producer: David Bendeth

Crystal Bowersox chronology
Farmer's Daughter (2010)	All That for This (2013)

Singles from Farmer's Daughter
- 1. "Farmer's Daughter" Released: December 13, 2010; 2. "Ridin' with the Radio" Released: 2011

Farmer's Daughter is the debut album of American Idol season nine runner-up Crystal Bowersox. It was released on December 14, 2010, through Jive Records.

== Background ==
After placing second on Idol, Crystal was signed to a deal with Jive Records and RCA's former sister record company 19 Recordings. Originally, Crystal wanted to delay the release of the album until early 2011, but ended up moving the release date to December 14. She is also to cover the Buffalo Springfield song "For What It's Worth," stating "its lyrics are relevant no matter what era it is, whatever war we're in and issues in the world," she said. "The song is always relevant." It was revealed that Chad Szeliga, who is well known for his drumming for bands such as Breaking Benjamin and OurAfter, has contributed drum tracks to the songs "Arlene", "Finally Got It Right" and "Hold On" which was written by Nickelback's Chad Kroeger The second single from the album was "Ridin' with the Radio" and was performed on American Idol.

The song "Holy Toledo" was played during Idol when she returned home. This is the first time an Idol contestant's own song was played during the show before their departure.

== Singles ==
"Farmer's Daughter" was released as the first single on December 13, 2010. "Hold On" was supposed to be the first single, but was switched to "Farmer's Daughter." The music video for "Farmer's Daughter" premiered on her website on December 16, 2010.

== Reception ==
Professional ratings
Review scores
Source	Rating
AllMusic	2.5/5 stars
The New York Times	5/5 stars
Yahoo! Music	Positive
Chicago Tribune	3/4 stars
Entertainment Weekly	C
New York Daily News	2/5 stars
USA Today	Mixed
The Dallas Morning News	B+
Slant Magazine	3/5 stars
Paste Magazine	6/10 stars

=== Critical reception ===
The album received mixed to positive reviews. Allmusic gave the album 2.5 stars out of 5. Joey Guerra of the Houston Chronicle said the album "failed to live up to Idol hype." Metacritic gave the album 63 out of 100 based on six critical reviews.

=== Commercial success ===
In the United States, the album debuted at number 28 on the Billboard 200 chart, selling 58,000 copies and as of October 2011 has sold 205,000 copies.

In Canada, the album debuted at number 90 on the Canadian Albums Chart.

== Track listing ==
No.	Title	Writer(s)	Producer(s)	Length
1.	"Ridin' with the Radio"	Crystal Bowersox	David Bendeth	3:26
2.	"For What It's Worth"	Stephen Stills	Bendeth	3:18
3.	"Farmer's Daughter"	Bowersox	Bendeth	4:09
4.	"Hold On"	Kara DioGuardi; Chad Kroeger	Bendeth	3:13
5.	"Lonely Won't Come Around"	Bowersox; David Ryan Harris; Alexandra Tamposi	Bendeth; Harris	3:30
6.	"Holy Toledo"	Bowersox	Bendeth	3:51
7.	"On the Run"	Bowersox	Bendeth	3:23
8.	"Kiss Ya"	Bowersox	Bendeth	3:09
9.	"Speak Now"	Bowersox	Bendeth	4:48
10.	"Mine All Mine"	Bowersox	Bendeth	3:34
11.	"Mason"	Bowersox; Brian Walker	Bendeth	3:18
12.	"Arlene"	Bowersox	Bendeth	2:55
13.	"Finally Got It Right" (Bonus track, iTunes album pre-order only)	Bowersox

== Personnel ==
As noted at AllMusic:

- Crystal Bowersox: Vocals, acoustic guitar
- David Bendeth, Tommy Byrnes, David Ryan Harris, Nick Moroch: Guitars
- John Widgren: Dobro, pedal steel
- Jeff Kazee: Acoustic and electric piano, organ, keyboards, accordion
- Zac Rae: Keyboards
- Geoff Rockwell: Keyboards, programming
- Ryan Suzuka: Harmonica
- Sean Hurley, Frankie May, Greg Smith: Bass
- Chuck Burgi, Dorian Crozier, Dan Korneff: Drums
- Chad Szeliga: Drums, percussion
- Memo Acevedo: Percussion

== Charts and sales ==
=== Weekly charts ===
Chart (2010)	Peak position
US Billboard 200	28
US Digital Albums (Billboard)	8
US Top Rock Albums (Billboard)	2

=== Year-end charts ===
Chart (2011)	Position
US Billboard 200	181
US Top Rock Albums (Billboard)	33

=== Sales ===
Country	Sales
United States	205,000
