= Up to the Mountain (MLK Song) =

Patty Griffin song

Song by Patty Griffin
- Written: 2005
- Released: 2006
- Genre: Contemporary folk
- Songwriter: Patty Griffin

"Up to the Mountain (MLK Song)" is a contemporary folk song written by Patty Griffin. The song touches upon emotions surrounding Martin Luther King Jr.'s famous 1968 "I've Been to the Mountaintop" speech, given the day before his assassination in Memphis, Tennessee. Originally recorded by Solomon Burke in 2006 and Griffin herself in 2007, it has found greater prominence in performances and recordings since then by Kelly Clarkson and Jeff Beck, Susan Boyle, Crystal Bowersox, and Kree Harrison.

== Patty Griffin original and Solomon Burke recording ==
The song has been variously described as "gospely" or "folkie spiritual". In writing about King, Griffin followed other songwriters, such as U2 with "Pride (In the Name of Love)" and "MLK", James Taylor with "Shed a Little Light", and Stevie Wonder, whose song "Happy Birthday" about King provided a boost in bringing about the Martin Luther King Jr. Day national holiday. Griffin's take on King uses visual, naturalistic imagery to describe various states of mind expressed in the speech, but with a generality that could extend to other contexts as well:

Some days I look down,
Afraid I will fall—
And though the sun shines ...
I see nothing at all.

"Up to the Mountain" first appeared in public during Griffin's concert appearances in the spring of 2005; she has performed it both with her own acoustic guitar accompaniment and also with a band member's electric guitar. Based upon a rough demo, it was suggested to and selected by soul artist Solomon Burke (who had known King) for recording on his September 2006 album Nashville. Griffin participated in the recording, singing a backup part; she later said, "He sang it ten times I think, and I could tell when he got his take—little chills came on my arms."

Griffin recorded it herself officially in a slow rendition built around Ian McLagan's piano, with an accompanying string section, which appeared on her February 2007 album Children Running Through. It was praised by Slant Magazine for being "reverent and inspired without ever becoming over-the-top or heavy-handed," while a BBC review said it had "a feel of cinematic grandness." Thom Jurek of Allmusic stated that Griffin "carries [King]'s inspiration in the grain of her voice" and complimented her respectful and unassuming singing.

== Kelly Clarkson performance ==
"Up to the Mountain"

Promotional single by Kelly Clarkson featuring Jeff Beck
- Released: April 26, 2007
- Recorded: 2007
- Genre: Pop
- Length: 3:32
- Label: RCA/19
- Songwriter: Patty Griffin

"Up to the Mountain" gained visibility through a live rendition by Kelly Clarkson, featuring intertwined electric guitar by Jeff Beck, on an April 25, 2007 charity episode of the sixth season of American Idol, entitled 'Idol Gives Back'. The event was dedicated to poverty relief in Africa and in Hurricane Katrina-related areas in the United States. This event came in the middle of Clarkson's artistic struggle with her record company and management; they wanted her to promote her new single "Never Again", while she thought to do so at a charity event would be "beyond crass". Clarkson—an avowed Griffin fan—instead picked "Up to the Mountain". The audience gave the song and the performance a standing ovation; Beck subsequently said, "[she has] this fully developed soul voice that I wasn't expecting. It just knocked me out. It was quite riveting to listen to. At one point, the audience started to stand up. They were so moved by her." Idol judge Simon Cowell stated the performance was the best of the show.

A live recording of the Clarkson-Beck performance was made available for download on iTunes shortly after being broadcast on television and "Up To The Mountain" entered the Billboard Hot 100, debuting at number 56. This became the highest chart placement for a Griffin song. Clarkson added the song to the setlist for her 2007 My December Tour, and sang it together with Reba McEntire on the pair's 2 Worlds 2 Voices Tour in 2008.

The song was also included on Scottish singer Susan Boyle's November 2009 debut album, I Dreamed a Dream, which became the biggest-selling album in the world for that year. She commented regarding her choice of the song: "Reassurance, love and the ability to keep going no matter what 'slings and arrows of outrageous fortune' life throws at you.... God is our Light."

=== Chart ===
Chart (2007)	Peak position
US Billboard Hot 100	56

== Crystal Bowersox version ==
"Up to the Mountain"

Single by Crystal Bowersox
- Released: May 28, 2010
- Recorded: 2010
- Genre: Alternative rock
- Length: 3:53
- Label: 19 Recordings
- Songwriter: Patty Griffin

Crystal Bowersox singles chronology
"Up to the Mountain" (2010)	"Farmer's Daughter" (2010)

The song's Idol visibility continued in May 2010, when Crystal Bowersox performed it as her potential "coronation song" in the final round of American Idol season 9. Her performance of "Up to the Mountain" was well-received, both on the show—judge Randy Jackson characterized it as "an amazing song by an amazing singer" and Cowell said "that was by far the best performance and the song of the night"—and off—MTV said she showed an unmistakable connection to the lyric, while The Boston Globe said her performance of this "great song" was the night's only true highlight.

After Bowersox finished up as runner-up to Lee DeWyze, her recording of "Up to the Mountain" was released as a single on May 28, 2010.

=== Chart performance ===
Chart (2010)	Peak position
Canada Hot 100 (Billboard)	47
U.S. Billboard Hot 100	57

== See also ==
- Civil rights movement in popular culture
