= Technicien supérieur de l'aviation =

The degree of Technicien supérieur de l'aviation (TSA, in English Advanced Technician Degree in Aviation) is a certification created in 2010 from the Technicien supérieur des études et de l'exploitation de l'aviation civile certification. It is a title recognized by the CNCP, and registered at level III in the National Classification of Levels of Training. The degree is obtained after training at the École nationale de l'aviation civile (French civil aviation university).

== Application ==
Students can apply to this training by :

- A competitive examination organized by ENAC each year;
- A Validation des Acquis de l'Experience procedure.

== Training at ENAC ==
TSA students are admitted into one of these two options :

- "TSA Fonctionnaires" ( "civil servant TSA"); after the training they join the corps of the Technicien supérieur des études et de l'exploitation de l'aviation civile.
- "TSA Civils" (" civil TSA")

The choice is made by ranking at the competitive examination. The two options have the same curriculum. The civil servants have a dual education system before integrate the TSEEAC.

== Jobs ==
- Civil servants: they join the corps of the Technicien supérieur des études et de l'exploitation de l'aviation civile at the Directorate General for Civil Aviation.
- Civilians: they can be employed at an airport or with an airline. Possible areas include:
  - Ground handling services: air freight or passengers;
  - Air operations: flight preparation and management of flight crews;
  - Other missions of training, audit and expertise in aviation

== Bibliography ==
- Ariane Gilotte, Jean-Philippe Husson & Cyril Lazerge, 50 ans d'Énac au service de l'aviation, Édition S.E.E.P.P, 1999

== See also ==
- Technicien supérieur des études et de l'exploitation de l'aviation civile (TSEEAC)
- Technicien Supérieur de l'Aviation (civilian) (TSA civilian)
