= All That for This =

Studio album by Crystal Bowersox
- Released: March 19, 2013
- Genre: Folk rock; country
- Label: Shanachie Records
- Producer: Steve Berlin

Crystal Bowersox chronology
Farmer's Daughter (2010)	All That for This (2013)

Singles from All That for This
- 1. "Dead Weight" Released: February 5, 2013

All That for This is the second studio album from American singer-songwriter Crystal Bowersox. It was released on March 19, 2013 by Shanachie Records. The album features a duet with Jakob Dylan.

== Background ==
Bowersox describes the album as, "There are definitely more happier light-hearted moments on this record." "There are also touches of some of the darkest places and emotional states that I've been in my past. This album reveals a much more grateful and gracious side of me. It's the next chapter of my life."

== Singles ==
The first single from the album is "Dead Weight". It debuted on On Air with Ryan Seacrest on February 5, 2013.

== Track listing ==
No.	Title	Writer(s)	Length
1.	"Dead Weight"	Crystal Bowersox	4:23
2.	"Movin' On"	Bowersox	3:10
3.	"Everything Falls into Place"	Bowersox; Bryan Walker; Jonathan Manson	4:44
4.	"Home"	Bowersox	3:11
5.	"Someday"	Bowersox	3:57
6.	"I Am"	Bowersox	4:12
7.	"Shine"	Bowersox	5:46
8.	"Til the Whiskey's Gone"	Bowersox; Charles William King	3:43
9.	"Amen for My Friends"	Bowersox	4:21
10.	"Stitches" (with Jakob Dylan)	Bowersox; Walker	4:44
11.	"Here's Where the Story Ends"	David Gavurin; Harriet Elle Wheeler	3:50
12.	"All That for This"	Bowersox; Walker; Manson	4:41
Total length:			51:00

== Personnel ==
- Crystal Bowersox - vocals, acoustic guitar, background vocals, songwriting
- Paul Rigby - guitar, mandolin
- Dave Depper - bass
- Scott McPherson - drums
- Asher Fulero - keyboards
- Jesse Brooke - percussion
- Jakob Dylan - vocals
- Mark 'Speedy' Gonzales - trombone
- Gilbert Elorreaga - trumpet
- Josh Levy - baritone sax
- Joel Guzman - accordion
- Jans Ingber - congas, background vocals
- Steve Berlin - midisax

== Release history ==
List of release dates, showing region, label, format, edition(s) and catalog number
Region	Date	Label	Format(s)	Edition(s)	Catalog
United States	March 19, 2013	Shanachie Records	CD, digital download	Standard	
