= Tumour heterogeneity =

Observation of the diversity of tumour cells

Tumour heterogeneity describes the observation that different tumour cells can show distinct morphological and phenotypic profiles, including cellular morphology, gene expression, metabolism, motility, proliferation, and metastatic potential. This phenomenon occurs both between tumours (inter-tumour heterogeneity) and within tumours (intra-tumour heterogeneity). A minimal level of intra-tumour heterogeneity is a simple consequence of the imperfection of DNA replication: whenever a cell (normal or cancerous) divides, a few mutations are acquired—leading to a diverse population of cancer cells. The heterogeneity of cancer cells introduces significant challenges in designing effective treatment strategies. However, research into understanding and characterizing heterogeneity can allow for a better understanding of the causes and progression of disease. In turn, this has the potential to guide the creation of more refined treatment strategies that incorporate knowledge of heterogeneity to yield higher efficacy.

Tumour heterogeneity has been observed in leukemias, breast, prostate, colon, brain, esophagus, head and neck, bladder and gynecological carcinomas, liposarcoma, and multiple myeloma.

== Models of heterogeneity ==
There are two models used to explain the heterogeneity of tumour cells. These are the cancer stem cell model and the clonal evolution model. The models are not mutually exclusive, and it is believed that they both contribute to heterogeneity in varying amounts across different tumour types.

Ability of cancer cells to form tumours under the cancer stem cell and clonal evolution models of heterogeneity.

=== Cancer stem cells ===
The cancer stem cell model asserts that within a population of tumour cells, there is only a small subset of cells that are tumourigenic (able to form tumours). These cells are termed cancer stem cells (CSCs), and are marked by the ability to both self-renew and differentiate into non-tumourigenic progeny. The CSC model posits that the heterogeneity observed between tumour cells is the result of differences in the stem cells from which they originated. Stem cell variability is often caused by epigenetic changes, but can also result from clonal evolution of the CSC population where advantageous genetic mutations can accumulate in CSCs and their progeny (see below).

Evidence of the cancer stem cell model has been demonstrated in multiple tumour types including leukemias, glioblastoma, breast cancer, and prostate cancer.

However, the existence of CSCs is still under debate. One reason for this is that markers for CSCs have been difficult to reproduce across multiple tumours. Further, methods for determining tumourigenic potential utilize xenograft models. These methods suffer from inherent limitations such as the need to control immune response in the transplant animal, and the significant difference in environmental conditions from the primary tumour site to the xenograft site (e.g. absence of required exogenous molecules or cofactors). This has caused some doubt about the accuracy of CSC results and the conclusions about which cells have tumourigenic potential.

=== Clonal evolution ===
The clonal evolution model was first proposed in 1976 by Peter Nowell. In this model, tumours arise from a single mutated cell, accumulating additional mutations as it progresses. These changes give rise to additional subpopulations, and each of these subpopulations has the ability to divide and mutate further. This heterogeneity may give rise to subclones that possess an evolutionary advantage over the others within the tumour environment, and these subclones may become dominant in the tumour over time. When proposed, this model allowed for the understanding of tumour growth, treatment failure, and tumour aggression that occurs during the natural process of tumour formation.

Branched evolution is more likely to contribute to tumour heterogeneity.

Evolution of the initial tumour cell may occur by two methods:

==== Linear expansion ====
Sequentially ordered mutations accumulate in driver genes, tumour suppressor genes, and DNA repair enzymes, resulting in clonal expansion of tumour cells. Linear expansion is less likely to reflect the endpoint of a malignant tumour because the accumulation of mutations is stochastic in heterogeneic tumours.

==== Branched expansion ====
Expansion into multiple subclonal populations occurs through a splitting mechanism. This method is more associated with tumour heterogeneity than linear expansion. The acquisition of mutations is random as a result of increased genomic instability with each successive generation. The long-term mutational accumulation may provide a selective advantage during certain stages of tumour progression. The tumour microenvironment may also contribute to tumour expansion, as it is capable of altering the selective pressures that the tumour cells are exposed to.

== Types and causes of heterogeneity ==
Multiple types of heterogeneity have been observed between tumour cells, stemming from both genetic and non-genetic variability.

=== Genetic heterogeneity ===
Genetic heterogeneity is a common feature of tumour genomes, and can arise from multiple sources. Some cancers are initiated when exogenous factors introduce mutations, such as ultraviolet radiation (skin cancers) and tobacco (lung cancer). A more common source is genomic instability, which often arises when key regulatory pathways are disrupted in the cells. Some examples include impaired DNA repair mechanisms which can lead to increased replication errors, and defects in the mitosis machinery that allow for large-scale gain or loss of entire chromosomes. Furthermore, it is possible for genetic variability to be further increased by some cancer therapies (e.g. treatment with temozolomide and other chemotherapy drugs).

Mutational tumour heterogeneity refers to variations in mutation frequency in different genes and samples and can be explored by MutSig. The etiology of mutational processes can considerably vary between tumour samples from the same or different cancer types and can be manifested in different context-dependent mutational profiles. It can be explored by COSMIC mutational signatures or MutaGene.

=== Other heterogeneity ===
Tumour cells can also show heterogeneity between their expression profiles. This is often caused by underlying epigenetic changes. Variation in expression signatures have been detected in different regions of tumour samples within an individual. Researchers have shown that convergent mutations affecting H3K36 methyltransferase SETD2 and histone H3K4 demethylase KDM5C arose in spatially separated tumour sections. Similarly, MTOR, a gene encoding a cell regulatory kinase, has shown to be constitutively active, thereby increasing S6 phosphorylation. This active phosphorylation may serve as a biomarker in clear-cell carcinoma.

Mechanochemical heterogeneity is a hallmark of living eukaryotic cells. It has an impact on epigenetic gene regulation. The heterogeneous dynamic mechanochemical processes regulate interrelationships within the group of cellular surfaces through adhesion. Tumour development and spreading is accompanied by change in heterogeneous chaotic dynamics of mechanochemical interaction process in the group cells, including cells within tumour, and is hierarchical for the host of cancer patients. The biological phenomena of mechanochemical heterogeneity maybe used for differential gastric cancer diagnostics against patients with inflammation of gastric mucosa and for increasing antimetastatic activity of dendritic cells based on vaccines when mechanically heterogenized microparticles of tumour cells are used for their loading. There is also a possible methodical approach based on the simultaneous ultrasound imaging diagnostic techniques and therapy, regarding the mechanochemical effect on nanobubles conglomerates with drugs in the tumour.

Redox processes in cancer cells induce changes in mechanochemical tumour heterogeneity by modifying bonds which influence the spatial arrangement of molecules in cell structures. This leads to the formation of regions with different biomechanical and biochemical properties within the tumour.

=== Tumour microenvironment ===
Heterogeneity between tumour cells can be further increased due to heterogeneity in the tumour microenvironment. Regional differences in the tumour (e.g. availability of oxygen) impose different selective pressures on tumour cells, leading to a wider spectrum of dominant subclones in different spatial regions of the tumour. The influence of microenvironment on clonal dominance is also a likely reason for the heterogeneity between primary and metastatic tumours seen in many patients, as well as the inter-tumour heterogeneity observed between patients with the same tumour type.

== Implications and challenges ==
=== Treatment resistance ===
Heterogeneic tumours may exhibit different sensitivities to cytotoxic drugs among different clonal populations. This is attributed to clonal interactions that may inhibit or alter therapeutic efficacy, posing a challenge for successful therapies in heterogeneic tumours (and their heterogeneic metastases).

Drug administration in heterogeneic tumours will seldom kill all tumour cells. The initial heterogeneic tumour population may bottleneck, such that few drug resistant cells (if any) will survive. This allows resistant tumour populations to replicate and grow a new tumour through the branching evolution mechanism (see above). The resulting repopulated tumour is heterogeneic and resistant to the initial drug therapy used. The repopulated tumour may also return in a more aggressive manner.

The administration of cytotoxic drugs often results in initial tumour shrinkage. This represents the destruction of initial non-resistant subclonal populations within a heterogeneic tumour, leaving only resistant clones. These resistant clones now contain a selective advantage and can replicate to repopulate the tumour. Replication will likely occur through branching evolution, contributing to tumour heterogeneity. The repopulated tumour may appear to be more aggressive. This is attributed to the drug-resistant selective advantage of the tumour cells.

Drug treatment induces a bottleneck effect, where resistant subclones will survive and propagate to re-form a heterogeneous tumour.

=== Prognosis in multiple myeloma ===
In multiple myeloma, genetic analyzes of the tumour is used to detect risks markers such as specific mutation, deletion, insertion etc. Helping to assess the Prognosis of the patient. But there is a discrepancy between patients, some patients associated with a good risk will relapse earlier than expected. In addition, in some patients, risks anomaly will only be observed at relapse. A study from 2023 using single cell showed that subclones with risks marker are present in some patients from the diagnosis but in such low frequency that they are not detectable by standard genetic routine assessment. Furthermore, this study indicated that patients with risks markers detectable only at relapse are indeed associated with a bad prognosis. With some risk anomaly there is no difference in the life expectancy (overall survival) between patients with the anomaly detected from the diagnosis and those with the anomaly only detected at relapse. Open question remains about the effect of the treatment on clonal selection. The therapeutic implication of this result is extensively developed in a paper : "Thus, sensitive detection approaches are required to detect these subclones at diagnosis together with innovative treatment strategies to eradicate low-frequency, high-risk subclones and prevent them from becoming dominant. [...] Finally, the described phenomenon is highly unlikely to be restricted to MM" (Multiple Myeloma).

=== Biomarker discovery ===
Due to the genetic differences within and between tumours, biomarkers that may predict treatment response or prognosis may not be widely applicable. However, it has been suggested that the level of heterogeneity can itself be used as a biomarker since more heterogeneous tumours may be more likely to contain treatment-resistant subclones. Further research into developing biomarkers that account for heterogeneity is still in progress.

=== Model systems ===
Current model systems typically lack the heterogeneity seen in human cancers. In order to accurately study tumour heterogeneity, we must develop more accurate preclinical models. One such model, the patient derived tumour xenograft, has shown excellent utility in preserving tumour heterogeneity whilst allowing detailed study of the drivers of clonal fitness. However, even this model cannot capture the full complexity of cancer.

== Current strategies ==
While the problem of identifying, characterizing, and treating tumour heterogeneity is still under active research, some effective strategies have been proposed, including both experimental and computational solutions.

=== Experimental ===
- Focused approach: analyzing a specific genetic locus or set of loci. This may occur through the detection of allelic imbalances (tumour DNA is compared to germline DNA), amplification of chromosomal regions (FISH), and/or sequencing specific genes. This method is used to trace the evolution of a specific mutation of interest, or to confirm a mutation researchers may suspect in a tumour.
  - Advantage: Allows for the analysis of specific genes (i.e. driver genes, tumour suppressors). The process is simple with straightforward interpretation of the results. FISH and immunofluorescence allows focus on tumour cell subtypes.
  - Disadvantage: Limited analysis will miss additional important mutations and patterns of clonal expansion. Allelic imbalances may be difficult to verify using microsatellite markers, therefore requiring verification by an independent technique (i.e. FISH). FISH requires large number of cells and is labour-intensive.
- Genome-wide approach: analyzing the entire genome in tumour samples. This may be done through karyotyping or comparative genomic hybridization (CGH) to detect chromosomal abnormalities. Sequencing of tumour biopsies is becoming more common.
  - Advantage: Does not rely on prior knowledge to identify variants. karyotyping identifies regions of large chromosomal abnormalities. CGH provides unbiased coverage and allows for small-scale allelic imbalances to be detected (SNP arrays). Sequencing will identify any variants that contribute to tumour heterogeneity.
  - Disadvantage: Difficult to determine the functional impact of variants (i.e. neutral or pathogenic). Limited resolution. Karyotyping of cultured cells may be biased towards preferential outgrowth of select tumour cell subpopulations. Limited resolution in both methods. The whole-genome approach may generate large amounts of data and be difficult to interpret.
- Multiregion sampling strategy: generally requires multiple post-surgical tumour samples from separate regions of a microdissected tumour. It is important to avoid contamination of non-malignant cells to ensure an accurate representation of gene expression and genetic composition seen within the tumour cells only. Analysis of tumour DNA within the spatially separated regions allows for the construction of a 3-dimensional evolutionary model of tumour heterogeneity. Multiregional sampling is often used in combination with the genome-wide approach to establish this 3D heterogeneity expansion model.
- Longitudinal sampling: through tumour progression or treatment progression, obtaining tumour samples during multiple points in time has been utilized in some cases. This has been suggested as a reliable method for tracking clonal evolution. However, this technique proves challenging in practice because it requires periodic invasive biopsy. New research into utilizing circulating cell-free tumour DNA in blood may provide a non-invasive way to identify biomarkers throughout treatment. Longitudinal sampling used in combination with the genome-wide approach will allow for the identification of the accumulated tumour cell mutations through time. This may in turn identify the key driver mutations (seen in initial tumour samples).
- Adaptive therapy may be used to prevent further tumour growth by adjusting drug dose and timing of drug administration based on the tumour's response. This strategy is assumed to prevent resistant variants from dominating a tumour. However, more research is required into its applicability.

=== Sequencing ===
- Bulk tumour sequencing can be utilized, where DNA is extracted from a mixture of tumour cells and analyzed all at once. The presence of heterogeneous tumour populations (subclones) introduces additional challenges such as:
  - The inability to detect mutations in rare subclones. Since these mutations will occur with low frequency in the pooled sample, they may be indistinguishable from background noise. However, many variant callers are being actively developed that are specifically designed for cancer data and aim to identify rare variants present in smaller subclonal populations. These typically utilize matched normal DNA as a means of distinguishing true somatic variation from germline variation and background sequencing error.
  - The inability to determine which subclones contain each mutation. Since the data is pooled, it is not clear which mutations co-occur and which populations they originate from. New tools are being developed that attempt to resolve clonal structure using allele frequencies for the observed mutations.
- Single-cell sequencing is a new technique that is valuable for assessing intra-tumour tumour heterogeneity, thought to be crucial to developing effective personalised cancer therapies because it can characterize individual tumour cells. This means that the entire mutational profile of multiple distinct cells can be determined with no ambiguity. Understanding intra-tumour heterogeneity better will allow for preventing relapse after treatment better, as current cancer treatments mostly target the dominant subclone, allowing secondary subclones to expand after treatment. While with current technology, it is difficult to evaluate sufficiently large numbers of single cells to obtain statistical power, single-cell tumour data has multiple advantages, including:
  - The ability to construct a phylogenetic tree showing the evolution of tumour populations. Using whole-genome sequences or SNP-based pseudo-sequences from individual cells, the evolution of the subclones can be estimated. This allows for the identification of populations that have persisted over time and can narrow down the list of mutations that potentially confer a growth advantage or treatment resistance on specific subclones. Algorithms for inferring a tumour phylogeny from single-cell DNA sequencing data include SCITE, OncoNEM, SiFit, SiCloneFit, PhISCS, and PhISCS-BnB. Current methodologies face challenges analyzing large-scale datasets. Combinatorial optimization-based approaches experience exponential growth in execution time with the increase of cells (m) and mutations (n). Solving the tumour progression tree reconstruction problem is NP-hard, indicating that finding a solution in polynomial time is improbable. Standard perfect phylogeny reconstruction approaches have not been applicable due to the high error rates in single-cell experiments. Probabilistic approaches have been found to be an alternative method for dealing with inconsistent data. These Bayesian approaches make use of Markov chain Monte Carlo (MCMC) sampling heuristics, which operate in polynomial time to explore the vast search space of possible tumour progression histories. By leveraging all the information contained in the data, these approaches offer a promising solution to the problem of inconsistent data. To understand the effectiveness of mutation tree MCMC methods and their required runtimes, it is crucial to understand how quickly the empirical distribution of the MCMC converges to the posterior distribution. Quantification of the posterior exploration is actively investigated in this domain. Recently, the novel application of convergence diagnostics established in continuous space to the discrete space of trees via tree similarities lead to promising results and well as in particular for mutation trees.
- Section sequencing can be done on multiple portions of a single solid tumour, and the variation in the mutation frequencies across the sections can be analyzed to infer the clonal structure. The advantages of this approach over single sequencing include more statistical power, and availability of more accurate information on the spatial positioning of samples. The latter can be used to infer the frequency of clones in sections and provide insight on how a tumour evolves in space. To infer the clones genotypes and phylogenetic trees that model a tumour evolution in time, several computational methods were developed including Clomial, cloneHD, PhyloWGS, PyClone, Cloe, phyC, Canopy, TargetClone, ddClone, PASTRI, GLClone, TRaIT, WSCUnmix, B-SCITE., ThetA, SIFA, Sclust, SeqClone, CALDER, BAMSE, Meltos, SubMARine, RNDCLONE, Conifer, DEVOLUTION, and RDAClone.

== See also ==
- Mouse models of breast cancer metastasis
