= Farmer's Daughter (Crystal Bowersox song) =

Single by Crystal Bowersox

from the album Farmer's Daughter
- Released: December 13, 2010
- Recorded: 2010
- Genre: Country rock
- Length: 4:09
- Label: Jive, 19
- Songwriter: Crystal Bowersox
- Producer: David Bendeth

Crystal Bowersox singles chronology
"Up to the Mountain" (2010)	"Farmer's Daughter" (2010)	"Ridin' with the Radio" (2011)

"Farmer's Daughter" is a song by American singer-songwriter Crystal Bowersox from her debut album of the same name.

== Background ==
The first single of the album was to be "Hold On", though Crystal Bowersox insisted that "Farmer's Daughter" be the debut single. Due to co-writing issues with Kara DioGuardi and Nickelback lead singer Chad Kroeger, the single was dropped.

The song reflects on Crystal's tumultuous and abusive relationship with her mother while growing up.

== Music video ==
The music video was directed by Meiert Avis and released on December 15, 2010, a day after the album's release. The video begins with Bowersox singing in a room while watching a flashback memory of losing her mother and walked alone. The next scene takes place at a school where Bowersox, now a teenager, is walking on crutches (a reference to the lyric "I told the school that I fell down the stairs") Then Bowersox is knitting a coat while watching the television. The video ends when a child jumps into Bowersox's arms.

== Critical reception ==
The Chicago Tribune says "the album finds its stride with the title song, a brutally plainspoken and poignant portrayal of childhood abuse."

== Charts ==
Chart (2010)	Peak position
Canada (Canadian Hot 100)	73
