= Transpacific Stabilization Agreement =

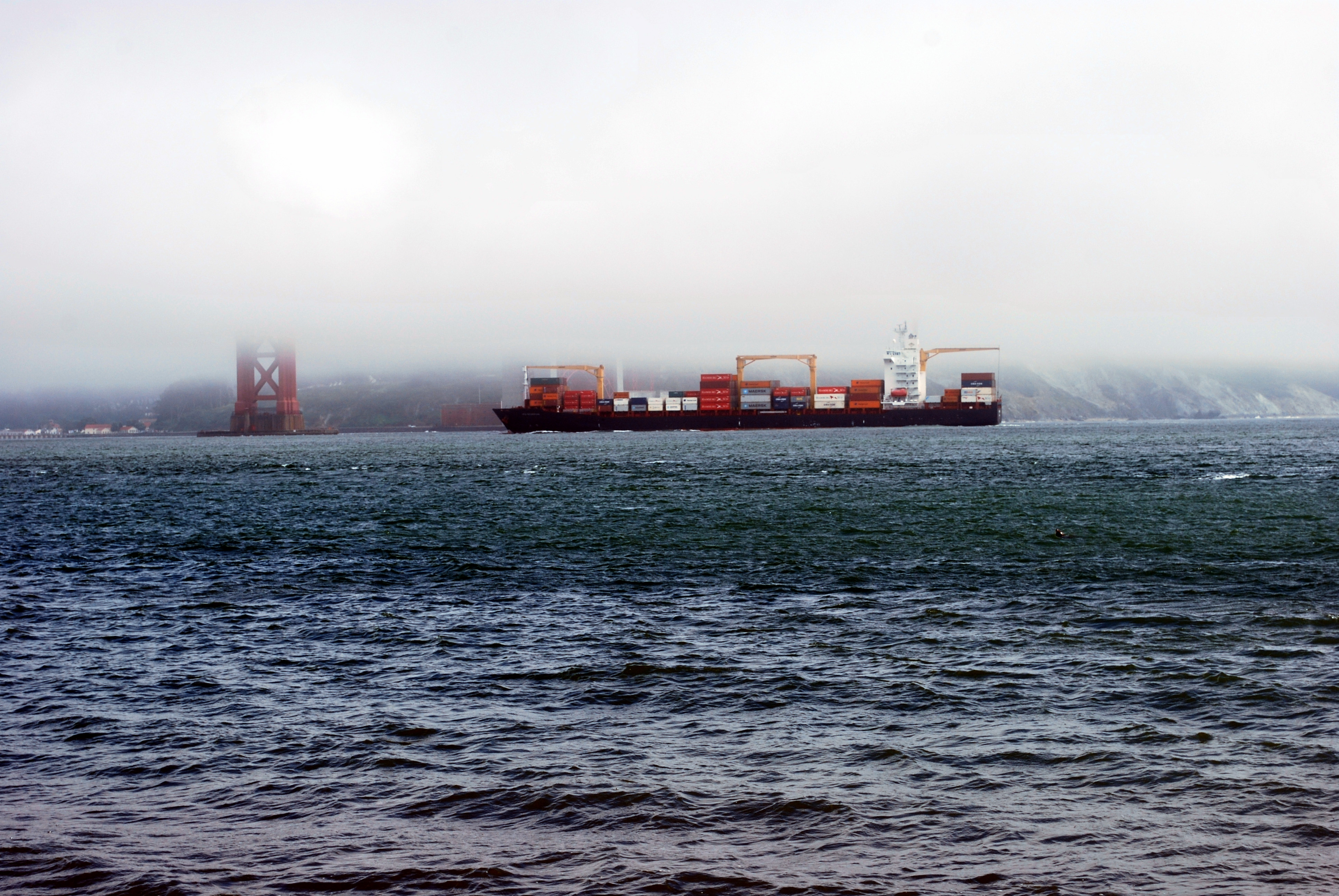
Container ship entering San Francisco Bay from the Pacific off Kirby Cove Beach

The Transpacific Stabilization Agreement (TSA) is a research and discussion forum used by 15 of the main container shipping lines which carry cargo between Asia and the United States. The agreement operates differently and has different membership for eastbound and westbound carriage. U.S. authorization falls under the oversight of the Federal Maritime Commission.

The members of the TSA (eastbound) and TSA (westbound, marked *) are:

- American President Lines *
- China Shipping Container Lines
- CMA CGM *
- COSCO *
- Evergreen Marine *
- Hanjin Shipping *
- Hapag-Lloyd *
- Hyundai Merchant Marine *
- K Line
- Maersk Line *
- Mediterranean Shipping Company *
- Nippon Yusen *
- Orient Overseas Container Line *
- Yang Ming Marine Transport Corporation *
- Zim Integrated Shipping Services. *

== External sites ==
- Eastbound: http://www.tsacarriers.org/
- Westbound: http://tsa-westbound.org/home.html
