= CAB39 =

Protein-coding gene in humans

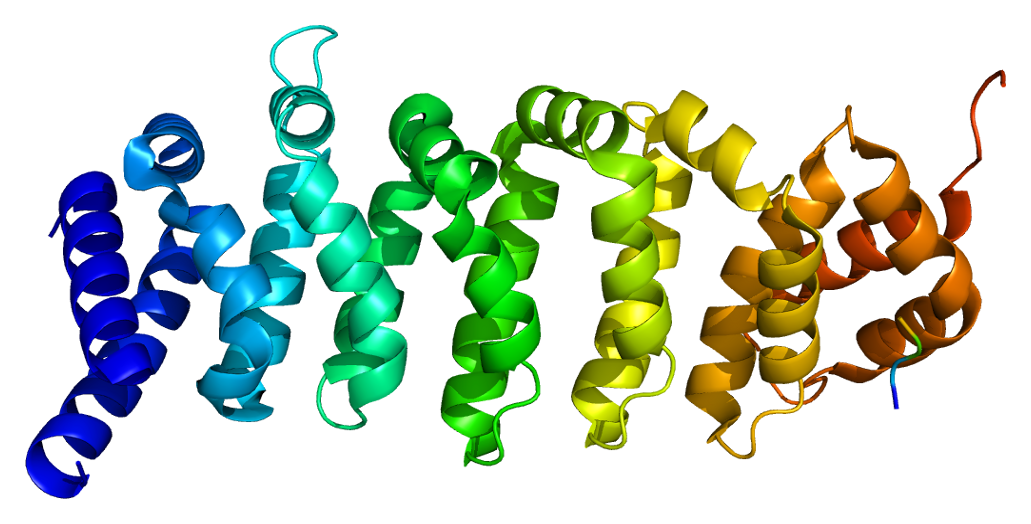

Identifiers
- Aliases: CAB39, MO25, CGI-66, calcium binding protein 39
- External IDs: OMIM: 612174; MGI: 107438; GeneCards: CAB39
Available structures
| PDB | Ortholog search: PDBe RCSB |
| PDB | List of PDB id codes 1UPK, 1UPL, 2WTK, 3GNI, 4FZA, 4FZD, 4FZF, 4NZW, 4O27 |

Gene location (Human)
| Chr. | Chromosome 2 (human) |
| Band | 2q37.1 | Start | 230,712,842 bp |
| Band | 2q37.1 | End | 230,821,075 bp |

Gene location (Mouse)
| Chr. | Chromosome 1 (mouse) |
| Band | 1|1 C5 | Start | 85,721,162 bp |
| Band | 1|1 C5 | End | 85,779,297 bp |
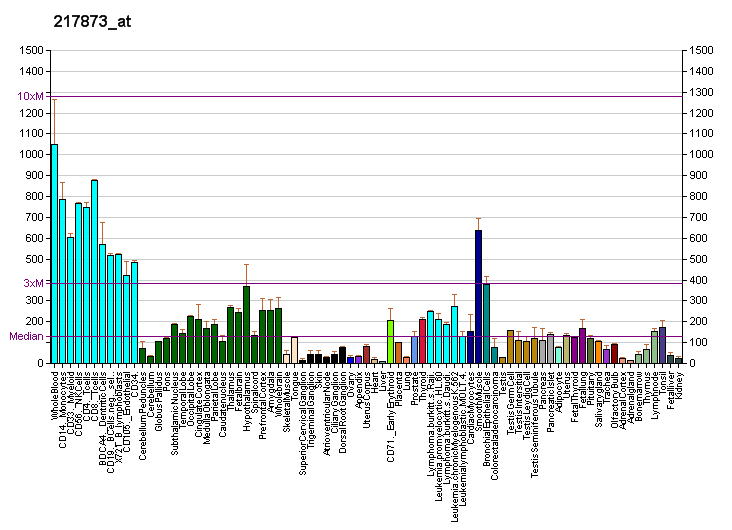
RNA expression pattern
| Bgee | Human / Mouse (ortholog); Top expressed in: amniotic fluid; tibia; middle temporal gyrus; Skeletal muscle tissue of rectus abdominis; Skeletal muscle tissue of biceps brachii; mucosa of sigmoid colon; palpebral conjunctiva; glutes; cartilage tissue; triceps brachii muscle / Top expressed in: facial motor nucleus; muscle of thigh; anterior horn of spinal cord; plantaris muscle; transitional epithelium of urinary bladder; soleus muscle; extensor digitorum longus muscle; gastrocnemius muscle; parotid gland; tibialis anterior muscle; More reference expression data |
| BioGPS | More reference expression data |
Gene ontology
| Molecular function | protein serine/threonine kinase activator activity; protein kinase activator activity; protein serine/threonine kinase activity; kinase binding; protein binding |
| Cellular component | cytoplasm; cytosol; serine/threonine protein kinase complex; extracellular exosome; extracellular region; secretory granule lumen; ficolin-1-rich granule lumen; protein-containing complex |
| Biological process | intracellular signal transduction; protein heterooligomerization; signal transduction; cellular hypotonic response; positive regulation of protein serine/threonine kinase activity; negative regulation of potassium ion transmembrane transporter activity; positive regulation of peptidyl-threonine phosphorylation; peptidyl-serine phosphorylation; negative regulation of potassium ion transmembrane transport; activation of protein kinase activity; neutrophil degranulation |
Sources:Amigo / QuickGO
Orthologs
| Databases | NCBI: entry; OMA: entry |
| Species | Human | Mouse |
| Entrez | 51719 | 12283 |
| Ensembl | ENSG00000135932 | ENSMUSG00000036707 |
| UniProt | Q9Y376 | Q06138 |
| RefSeq (mRNA) | NM_001130849; NM_001130850; NM_016289 | NM_133781; NM_001355046; NM_001355047 |
| RefSeq (protein) | NP_001124321; NP_001124322; NP_057373 | NP_598542; NP_001341975; NP_001341976 |
| Location (UCSC) | Chr 2: 230.71 – 230.82 Mb | Chr 1: 85.72 – 85.78 Mb |
| PubMed search |
- Wikidata
| View/Edit Human | View/Edit Mouse |

Calcium-binding protein 39 is a protein that in humans is encoded by the CAB39 gene.

The protein encoded by this gene associates with STK11 (Serine/Threonine Kinase 11) and STRAD (STE20-Related ADaptor protein). CAB39 enhances formation of STK11/STRAD complexes and stimulates STK11 catalytic activity. CAB39 may function as a scaffolding component of the STK11/STRAD complex and regulates STK11 activity and cellular localization.
