= Toledo School for the Arts =

Public charter school in Ohio, United States

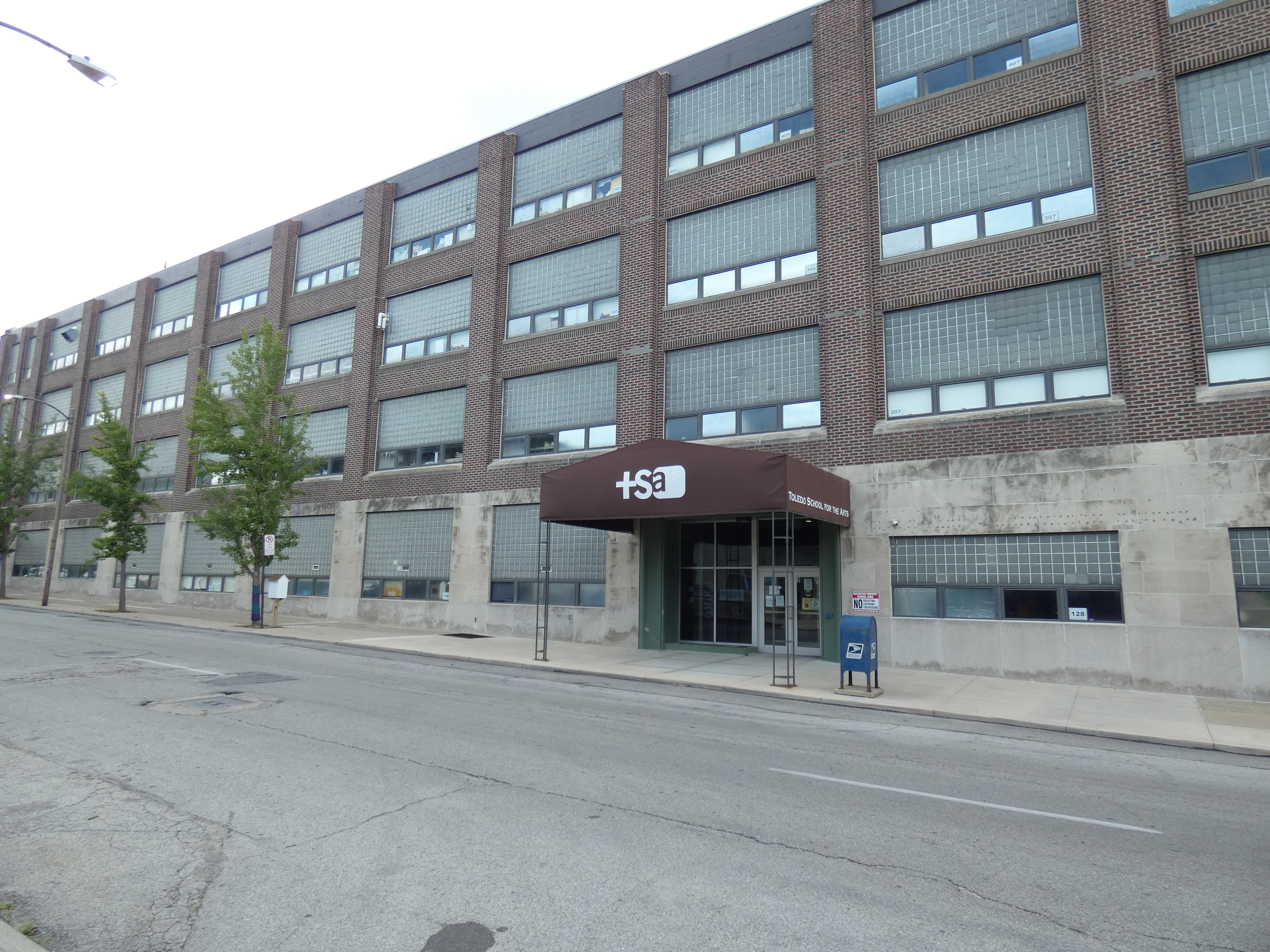
- School's main entrance

Location
- 333 14th Street; Toledo, Ohio 43604; United States; 41°39′23″N 83°32′37″W

Information
- Type: Public, Coeducational Charter school
- Opened: 1999; 27 years ago
- Founder: Martin D. Porter
- Director: Rob Koenig
- Principal: Letha Ferguson
- Sponsor: Bowling Green State University
- Teaching staff: 53.31
- Grades: 6–12
- Enrollment: 697 (2020–21)
- Student to teacher ratio: 13.07
- Campus type: Urban
- Color: Rainbow
- Slogan: "When Pigs Fly"
- Mascot: Flying Pig
- Nickname: TSA
- Website: ts4arts.org

Toledo School for the Arts is a public charter school in downtown Toledo, Ohio founded by former director Martin Porter. It was first sponsored by the Toledo Board of Education. In 2008 the school was chartered by Bowling Green State University. TSA serves over 700 students from any school district in Ohio in Junior Division (6th, 7th and 8th grades), and Senior Division (9th, 10th, 11th and 12th grades). TSA's college preparatory curriculum integrates the visual, language, and performing arts. In addition to core academic subjects, classes are offered in dance, music, theatre, English language, humanities, and visual arts and include training and career development for students interested in pursuing professions in the arts. TSA students have been accepted to many of the nation's best colleges and universities.

== Events ==
First Friday is a monthly event for the public with performances, demonstrations and exhibits of student work. The highlight of each year is Kaleidoscope, a performance and art exhibit that features student works from each department as well as student soloists. Students collectively participate in an average of 180 performances and exhibitions each year.

== Community ==
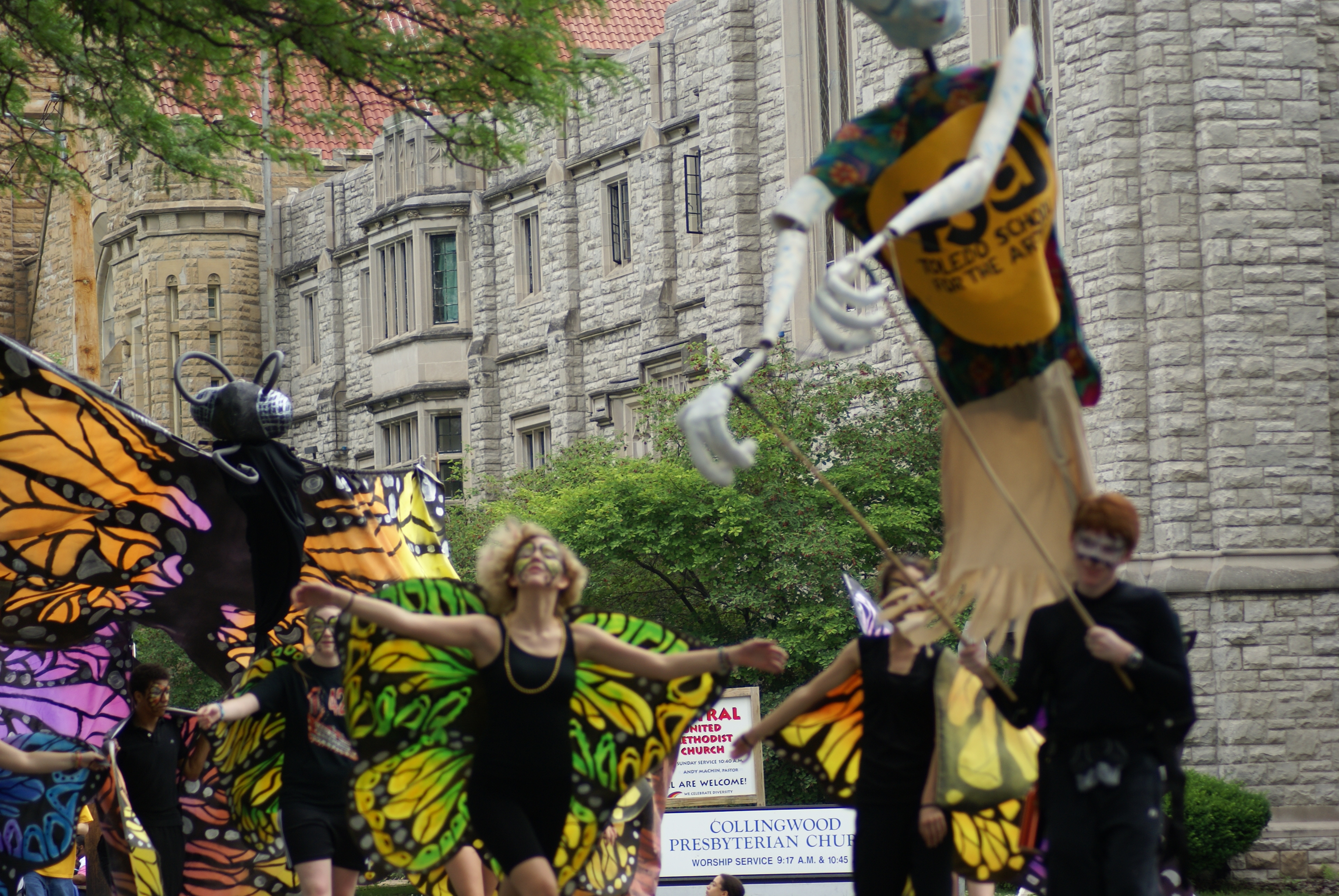
Toledo School for the Arts at the Old West End Festival in 2010.

TSA has "ARTnerships" with Toledo's major cultural institutions, including the Toledo Symphony Orchestra, the Arts Commission of Greater Toledo, the Toledo Museum of Art, the Toledo Ballet Association, Toledo Repertoire Theatre, and Ballet Theatre of Toledo. ARTnerships are community organizations that share TSA's vision.

== History ==
The Toledo School for the Arts began operating in 1999.

In 2004, TSA moved to 333 14th Street, the former Willys Overland building located in uptown Toledo. In 2009 the school opened its own gallery to allow them the ability to hold art shows and sell student art throughout the year.

In 2008 TSA was awarded a No School Left Behind Blue Ribbon from the US Department of Education. In 2007 TSA was identified as one of the leading charter schools in the nation, and featured in the US Department of Education publication, Innovations in Education Reform. TSA has twice been designated a Bronze Medal School by U.S. News & World Report.

In 2016 TSA was named the number one charter school in Ohio by the website Niche, a website that ranks schools based on data and reviews. They were also named the 25th best school in Ohio by Niche.

In 2019 TSA unveiled an Ohio Historic Marker on the corner of 14th and Adams detailing the history of the building which was constructed in the early 1900s by the Willys Overland Company. During the unveiling the school announced plans to expand the historic building with an addition and increase student enrollment. This marker was then, in 2021, knocked down in a motor vehicle accident and was officially replaced in fall of 2025.

In 2022 the Toledo School for the Arts began groundbreaking on a major expansion.

== Notable alumni ==
- Crystal Bowersox – American singer-songwriter and actress (born 1985)
- Britain Feeny - Radio City Rockette - dancer and choreographer
