= Paola Marignani =

Canadian researcher and molecular biologist

Paola A. Marignani
- Education: University of Windsor (H BSc); University of Western Ontario (MSc); McMaster University (PhD); Harvard (Postdoctoral Fellow); Ivey School of Business (EMBA)
- Scientific career
- Fields: Molecular Biology, Precision Medicine, Single-cell transcriptomics
- Workplaces: Dalhousie University
- Website: https://marignanilab.com/

Paola A. Marignani is a scientist and Full Professor at Dalhousie University in the Faculty of Medicine, Department of Biochemistry and Molecular Biology. She is best known for her research on the tumor suppressor kinase LKB1, and its role in regulating the chromatin remodeling protein SMARCA4 and modeling metabolic processes in breast and lung cancers.

== Biography ==
Marignani completed her Hon BSc in Biology from the University of Windsor, followed by an MSc in Neurobiology from the University of Western Ontario. She earned her PhD in Cell Biology from McMaster University. Her postdoctoral training took place at Harvard Medical School in the Division of Signal Transduction followed by the Lunenfeld-Tanenbaum Research Institute and the Ontario Cancer Institute in Toronto, Ontario. She also holds an Executive MBA from the Ivey School of Business at Western University, and a certificate from MIT Sloan School of Management in Artificial Intelligence in Health Care. Marignani is also a scientist mentor at the Creative Destruction Lab and scientific director of the QEII Lung Tumour Bank.

== Scientific career ==
Marignani is known for research in tumor-suppressing proteins, notably LKB1. In 2001, Marignani discovered the first binding partner of LKB1, specifically SMARCA4, a chromatin remodeling protein. In subsequent studies, Marignani discovered that LKB1 regulates estrogen receptors in breast tissue. Her further research led to the discovery that LKB1 expression in HER2+ breast cancer is reduced or lost. This discovery led to the development of a HER2/ErbB2 mouse model where lkb1 expression was re-engineered. The resulting mice developed mammary tumors quicker than control mice, and the tumors were hyperactive for mTOR and cancer metabolism. Marignani combines technologies such as single-cell transcriptomics and machine learning to interrogate disease processes and discover targeted therapies in the framework of precision medicine. She is a researcher in the Marathon of Hope Cancer Centres Network, a national network of institutions launched by the Terry Fox Research Institute in 2019 to advance precision oncology research.

Marignani also researches disparities in cancer incidence and outcomes within a Black Canadian community in South Shelburne, Nova Scotia. This initiative is part of a broader project funded by the New Frontiers in Research Fund, and seeks to shed light on historical and ongoing systemic issues related to healthcare access and quality.

In addition to funding from Breast Cancer Canada for her research in identifying unique markers associated with HER2+ breast cancer recurrence, Marignani has also been funded by NSERC, CIHR, and the Canadian Foundation for Innovation. She has also been awarded for Excellence in Cancer Research by the Canadian Cancer Society.

Marignani's earlier research focused on understanding the molecular changes to signaling molecules resulting from polyunsaturated fatty acid incorporation into lipid membranes. She discovered that the integration of eicosapentaenoic acid (EPA) and docosahexaenoic acid (DHA) into lipid membranes altered diacylglycerol profiles in murine macrophages, which could lead to downstream changes in signaling events.

== Awards ==
- 2026 Scientist of the Year Award (2025/2026), Creative Destruction Lab Atlantic
- 2026 Excellence in Basic Science Research, Schulich School of Medicine & Dentistry Alumni of Distinction Award
- 2025 Discovery Awards Science Champion

== Selected publications ==
- Bourouh, Mohammed; Jinhong Kim; Marignani, Paola (2026). "Tumor suppressors LKB1 and SMARCA4 functionally interact to regulate gene expression across diverse biological processes in lung cancer". Frontiers in Cell and Developmental Biology. 14. doi:10.3389/fcell.2026.1685342. Wikidata Q138710226.
- Jinhong Kim; Marignani, Paola (2022). "Single-Cell RNA Sequencing Analysis Using Fluidigm C1 Platform for Characterization of Heterogeneous Transcriptomes". Methods in Molecular Biology. pp. 261–278. doi:10.1007/978-1-0716-2376-3_19. ISSN 1064-3745. Wikidata Q125798347.
- Jinhong Kim; Zhaolin Xu; Marignani, Paola (2021). "Single-cell RNA sequencing for the identification of early-stage lung cancer biomarkers from circulating blood". npj Genomic Medicine. 6 (1): 87. doi:10.1038/s41525-021-00248-y. PMC 8519939. PMID 34654834. Wikidata Q112643227.
- Ava Vila-Leahey; Sharon A Oldford; Marignani, Paola; Jun Wang; Ian D Haidl; Marshall, Jean (2016). "Ranitidine modifies myeloid cell populations and inhibits breast tumor development and spread in mice". OncoImmunology. 5 (7) e1151591. doi:10.1080/2162402x.2016.1151591. PMC 5006904. PMID 27622015. Wikidata Q37222105.
- Rafaela Andrade-Vieira; Donna Goguen; Heidi A Bentley; Chris V Bowen; Marignani, Paola (2014). "Pre-clinical study of drug combinations that reduce breast cancer burden due to aberrant mTOR and metabolism promoted by LKB1 loss". Oncotarget. 5 (24): 12738–12752. doi:10.18632/oncotarget.2818. PMC 4350354. PMID 25436981. Wikidata Q35149656.
- Rafaela Andrade-Vieira; Zhaolin Xu; Patricia Colp; Marignani, Paola (2013). "Loss of LKB1 expression reduces the latency of ErbB2-mediated mammary gland tumorigenesis, promoting changes in metabolic pathways". PLOS One. 8 (2) e56567. Bibcode:2013PLoSO...856567A. doi:10.1371/journal.pone.0056567. PMC 3579833. PMID 23451056. Wikidata Q34602408.
- Suchita Nath-Sain; Marignani, Paola (2009). "LKB1 catalytic activity contributes to estrogen receptor alpha signaling". Molecular Biology of the Cell. 20 (11): 2785–2795. doi:10.1091/mbc.e08-11-1138. PMC 2688557. PMID 19369417. Wikidata Q37207745.
- Kristine D Scott; Suchita Nath-Sain; Meghan D Agnew; Marignani, Paola (2007). "LKB1 catalytically deficient mutants enhance cyclin D1 expression". Cancer Research. 67 (12): 5622–5627. doi:10.1158/0008-5472.can-07-0762. PMID 17575127. Wikidata Q53545879.
- Marignani, Paola; F Kanai; C L Carpenter (2001). "LKB1 associates with Brg1 and is necessary for Brg1-induced growth arrest". Journal of Biological Chemistry. 276 (35): 32415–8. doi:10.1074/jbc.c100207200. PMID 11445556. Wikidata Q28205561.
- Marignani, Paola; C L Carpenter (2001). "Vav2 is required for cell spreading". Journal of Cell Biology. 154 (1): 177–86. doi:10.1083/jcb.200103134. PMC 2196856. PMID 11448999. Wikidata Q24654126.
- F Kanai; Marignani, Paola; D Sarbassova; et al. (2000). "TAZ: a novel transcriptional co-activator regulated by interactions with 14-3-3 and PDZ domain proteins". The EMBO Journal. 19 (24): 6778–91. doi:10.1093/emboj/19.24.6778. PMC 305881. PMID 11118213. Wikidata Q24290626.
