= Heartland Cafe =

American restaurant

Coordinates: 42.0093°N 87.6665°W

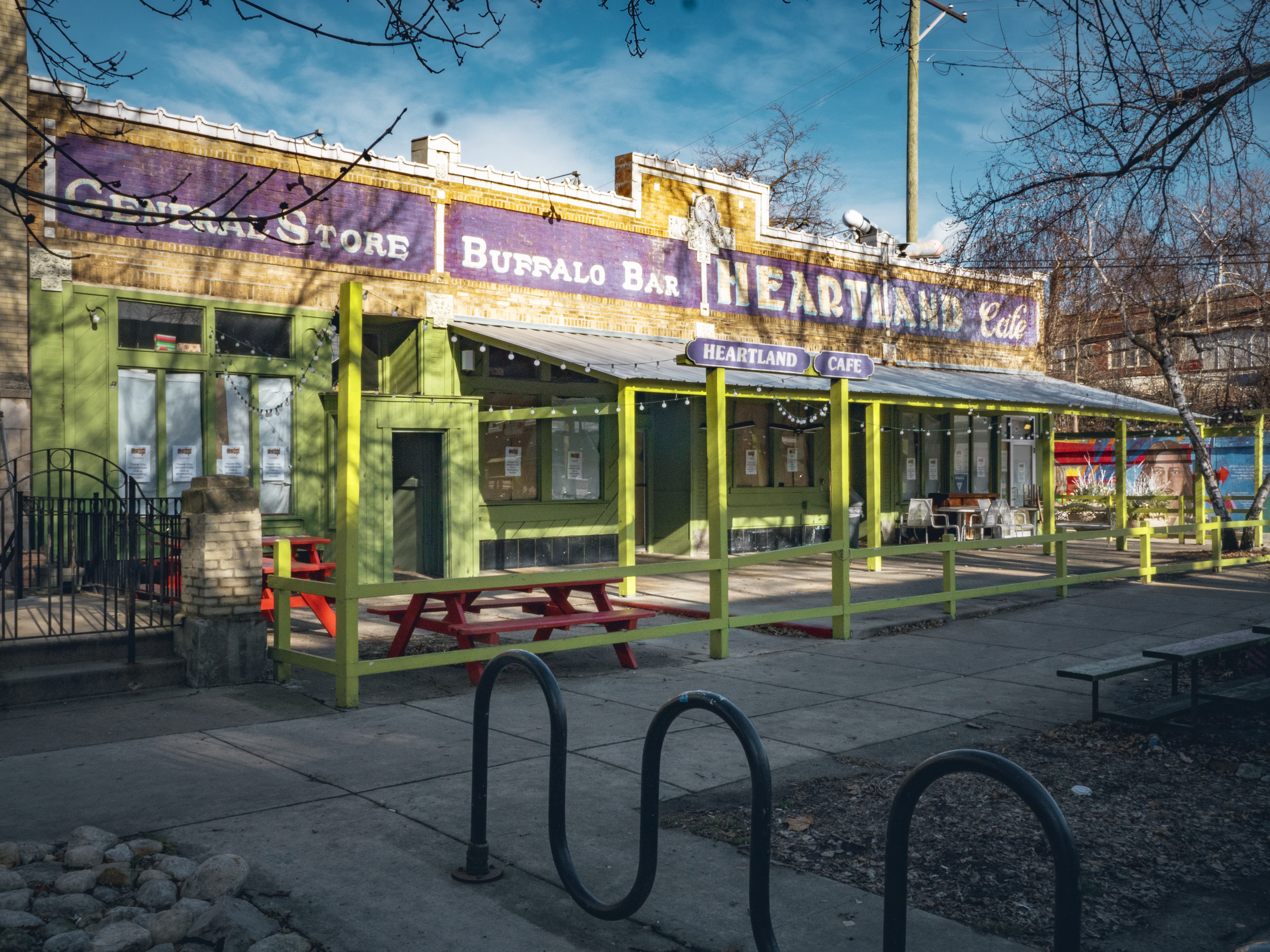
Heartland Cafe

The Heartland Cafe was a restaurant in the Rogers Park neighborhood of Chicago. Originally opened in 1976 by two activists as the "Sweet Home Chicago Heartland Café," it became a cultural icon for the diverse neighborhood, known as much for its hippie ambience and left-leaning politics as for its largely (but not exclusively) vegetarian food.

== Political and social center ==
Part of a complex of buildings that also contained a theatre studio, an adjoining music venue, and a newsstand and general store within the restaurant itself, the restaurant was routinely referred to as an "institution" and a social and political center of the neighborhood. Politicians ranging from local candidates to Barack Obama held rallies and events at the Heartland creating a long history of political activism and served as a civic forum for Rogers Park and Chicago. A radio show, Live from the Heartland, hosted in-part by the cafe's original founders, Katy Hogan and Michael James, was broadcast live every Saturday on WLUW (88.7FM) from the dining room while customers ate. The adjoining Roy's Red Line Tap known for its cheap drinks and pool tables, run by Roy Kawaguchi until 1996, became part of the Heartland Cafe institutional mix as the Redline Tap and music venue.

== Sale ==
Heartland Cafe's last owner was Tom Rosenfeld, an organic farmer who also operated Earth First Farms in southwest Michigan. Under Rosenfeld's ownership, Heartland was home to a full service natural food grocery store, sit down restaurant and live music venue.

== Demise ==
Plans to sell the building and close the business were announced and the restaurant closed on December 31, 2018. The owners hope to reopen in a new location in the future. A demolition permit for the building was issued on April 15, 2019 and demolition began within a week.
