= STRAD alpha =

Protein found in humans

STRADA
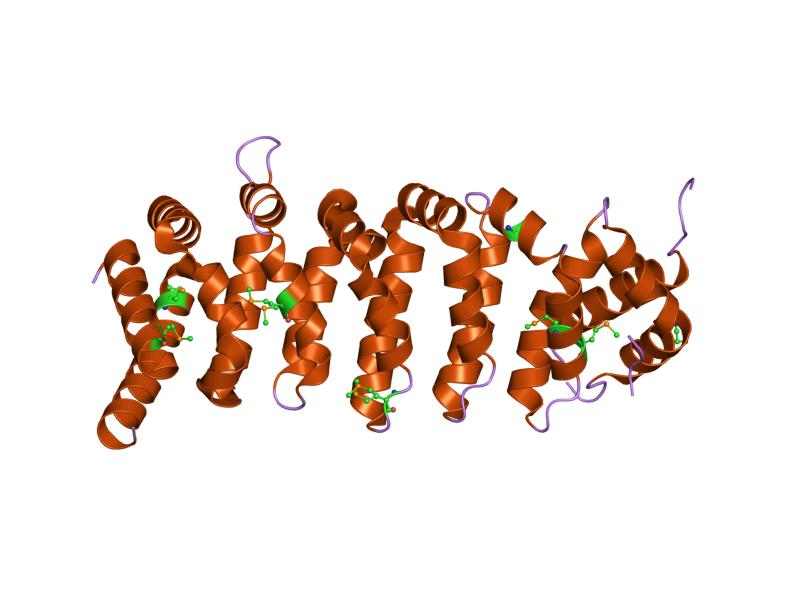

Identifiers
- Aliases: STRADA, LYK5, NY-BR-96, PMSE, STRAD, Stlk, STE20-related kinase adaptor alpha, STRAD alpha, STE20 related adaptor alpha
- External IDs: OMIM: 608626; MGI: 1919399; GeneCards: STRADA
Available structures
PDB	Ortholog search: PDBe RCSB
PDB	List of PDB id codes 1UPK, 2WTK, 3GNI

Gene location (Human)
Chr.	Chromosome 17 (human)
Band	17q23.3	Start	63,682,336 bp
Band	17q23.3	End	63,741,986 bp

Gene location (Mouse)
Chr.	Chromosome 11 (mouse)
Band	11|11 E1	Start	106,054,156 bp
Band	11|11 E1	End	106,092,994 bp
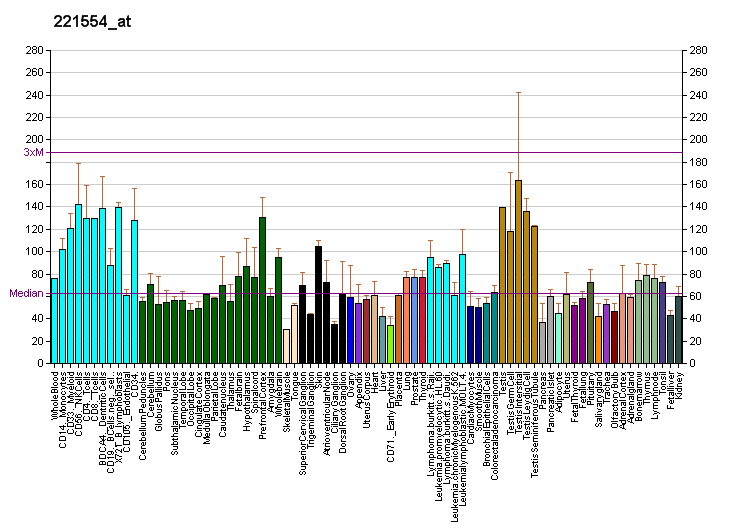

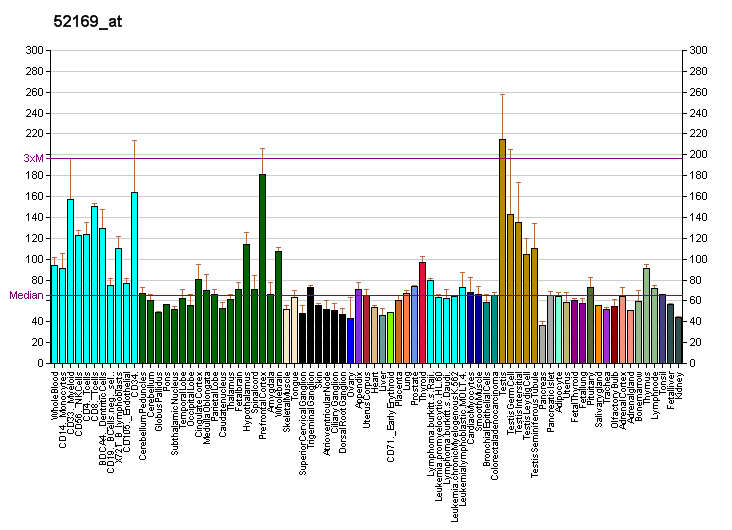
RNA expression pattern
Bgee	Human / Mouse (ortholog); Top expressed in: right uterine tube; gastric mucosa; left testis; right testis; tibial nerve; right hemisphere of cerebellum; right frontal lobe; ganglionic eminence; right ovary; body of uterus / Top expressed in: spermatocyte; seminiferous tubule; spermatid; neural layer of retina; morula; granulocyte; tail of embryo; zygote; ventricular zone; superior frontal gyrus; More reference expression data
BioGPS	More reference expression data
Gene ontology
Molecular function	protein binding; protein serine/threonine kinase activator activity; protein kinase activator activity; protein kinase activity; ATP binding; nucleotide binding; kinase binding; protein serine/threonine kinase activity
Cellular component	nucleoplasm; nucleus; cytoplasm; cytosol
Biological process	protein export from nucleus; cell cycle; protein phosphorylation; positive regulation of protein serine/threonine kinase activity; activation of protein kinase activity; regulation of mitotic cell cycle; stress-activated protein kinase signaling cascade; regulation of apoptotic process; MAPK cascade; signal transduction; neuron projection morphogenesis
Sources:Amigo / QuickGO
Orthologs
Databases	NCBI: entry; OMA: entry
Species	Human	Mouse
Entrez	92335	72149
Ensembl	ENSG00000266173	ENSMUSG00000069631
UniProt	Q7RTN6	Q3UUJ4
RefSeq (mRNA)	NM_001003786; NM_001003787; NM_001003788; NM_001165969; NM_001165970 NM_153335; NM_001363786; NM_001363787; NM_001363788; NM_001363789; NM_001363790; NM_001363791	NM_001252448; NM_001252449; NM_028126
RefSeq (protein)	NP_001003786; NP_001003787; NP_001003788; NP_001159441; NP_001159442 NP_699166; NP_001350715; NP_001350716; NP_001350717; NP_001350718; NP_001350719; NP_001350720	NP_001239377; NP_001239378; NP_082402
Location (UCSC)	Chr 17: 63.68 – 63.74 Mb	Chr 11: 106.05 – 106.09 Mb
PubMed search
- Wikidata
View/Edit Human	View/Edit Mouse

STRAD alpha (or STRADα) is a protein that in humans is encoded by the gene STRADA (previously LYK5).

== Function ==
Endogenous LKB1 and STRADα form a complex in which STRADα activates LKB1, resulting in phosphorylation of both partners. Removal of endogenous LYK5 by small interfering RNA abrogates LKB1-induced G1 phase arrest. STRADα stabilizes LKB1 protein both in vivo and in vitro, and is capable of eliciting multiple axons in mouse embryonic cortical cultured neurons when overexpressed with LKB1. STRADα is highly spliced in vivo, and this is both developmentally regulated and tissue-specific, but the unique functions of the splice variants are not yet understood.

== Disease linkage ==
Mutations in the LYK5/STRADα gene are associated with polyhydramnios, megalencephaly and symptomatic epilepsy (collectively known as the PMSE syndrome).

== Interactions ==
STRADα has been shown to interact with LKB1 and MO25.
