= STK11 =

Protein-coding gene in the species Homo sapiens

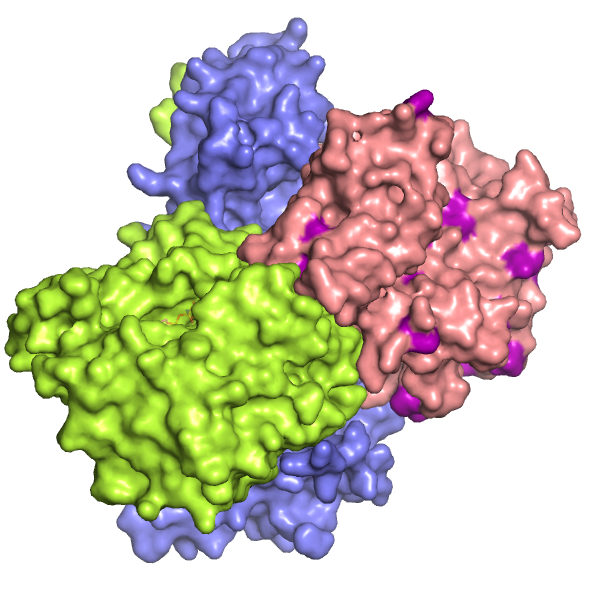

Identifiers
- Aliases: STK11, LKB1, PJS, hLKB1, serine/threonine kinase 11
- External IDs: OMIM: 602216; MGI: 1341870; GeneCards: STK11
Available structures
PDB	Ortholog search: PDBe RCSB
PDB	List of PDB id codes 2WTK, 4ZDR
Enzyme activity
EC #	BRENDA	ExPASy	KEGG	MetaCyc
2.7.11.1	↗	↗	↗	↗

Gene location (Human)
Chr.	Chromosome 19 (human)
Band	19p13.3	Start	1,177,558 bp
Band	19p13.3	End	1,228,431 bp

Gene location (Mouse)
Chr.	Chromosome 10 (mouse)
Band	10|10 C1	Start	79,951,637 bp
Band	10|10 C1	End	79,966,516 bp
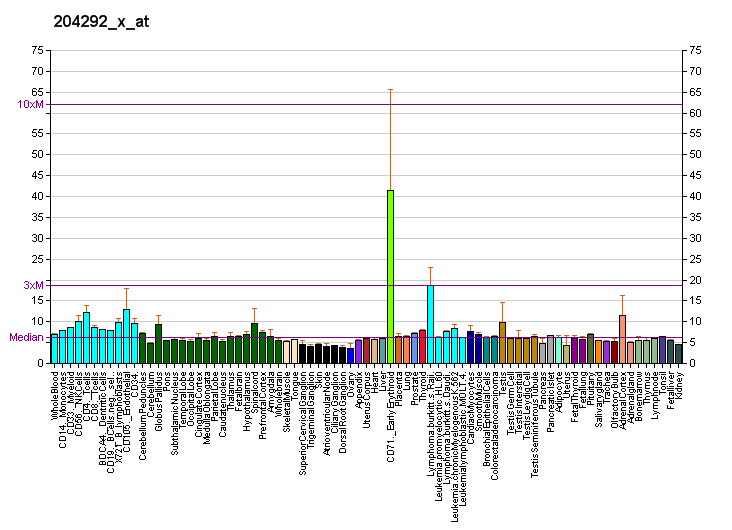

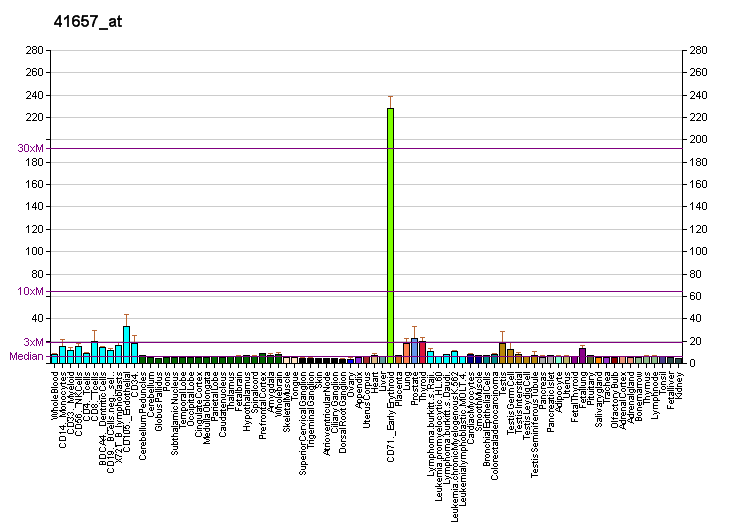
RNA expression pattern
Bgee	Human / Mouse (ortholog); Top expressed in: left testis; right testis; muscle of thigh; gastrocnemius muscle; granulocyte; stromal cell of endometrium; right hemisphere of cerebellum; tendon of biceps brachii; mucosa of transverse colon; apex of heart / Top expressed in: Ileal epithelium; granulocyte; saccule; ventricular zone; muscle of thigh; otic placode; neural layer of retina; lip; zygote; yolk sac; More reference expression data
BioGPS	More reference expression data
Gene ontology
Molecular function	transferase activity; nucleotide binding; LRR domain binding; protein kinase activity; p53 binding; protein kinase activator activity; metal ion binding; kinase activity; protein serine/threonine kinase activity; protein binding; ATP binding; magnesium ion binding
Cellular component	cytoplasm; membrane; mitochondrion; extracellular exosome; TCR signalosome; nucleus; nucleoplasm; cytosol
Biological process	response to ionizing radiation; positive regulation of transforming growth factor beta receptor signaling pathway; dendrite extension; TCR signalosome assembly; axonogenesis; glucose homeostasis; positive regulation of autophagy; phosphorylation; negative regulation of lipid biosynthetic process; positive regulation of axonogenesis; cellular response to DNA damage stimulus; regulation of dendrite morphogenesis; autophagy; protein phosphorylation; Golgi localization; regulation of Wnt signaling pathway; vasculature development; anoikis; cellular response to UV-B; negative regulation of cell growth; regulation of cell growth; tissue homeostasis; establishment of cell polarity; positive thymic T cell selection; positive regulation of peptidyl-tyrosine phosphorylation; regulation of protein kinase B signaling; canonical Wnt signaling pathway; intrinsic apoptotic signaling pathway by p53 class mediator; protein autophosphorylation; cell cycle; negative regulation of epithelial cell proliferation involved in prostate gland development; T cell receptor signaling pathway; spermatogenesis; activation of protein kinase activity; negative regulation of TORC1 signaling; negative regulation of cell population proliferation; positive regulation of protein localization to nucleus; apoptotic process; regulation of signal transduction by p53 class mediator; nervous system development; peptidyl-serine phosphorylation; peptidyl-threonine phosphorylation; cell differentiation; positive regulation of protein serine/threonine kinase activity; protein dephosphorylation; negative regulation of canonical Wnt signaling pathway; negative regulation of cold-induced thermogenesis
Sources:Amigo / QuickGO
Orthologs
Databases	NCBI: entry; OMA: entry
Species	Human	Mouse
Entrez	6794	20869
Ensembl	ENSG00000118046	ENSMUSG00000003068
UniProt	Q15831	Q9WTK7
RefSeq (mRNA)	NM_000455	NM_001301853; NM_001301854; NM_011492
RefSeq (protein)	NP_000446	NP_001288782; NP_001288783; NP_035622
Location (UCSC)	Chr 19: 1.18 – 1.23 Mb	Chr 10: 79.95 – 79.97 Mb
PubMed search
- Wikidata
View/Edit Human	View/Edit Mouse

Serine/threonine kinase 11 (STK11) also known as liver kinase B1 (LKB1) or renal carcinoma antigen NY-REN-19 is a protein kinase that in humans is encoded by the STK11 gene.

== Expression ==
Testosterone and DHT treatment of murine 3T3-L1 or human SGBS adipocytes for 24 h significantly decreased the mRNA expression of LKB1 via the androgen receptor and consequently reduced the activation of AMPK by phosphorylation. In contrast, 17β-estradiol treatment increased LKB1 mRNA, an effect mediated by oestrogen receptor alpha.

However, in ER-positive breast cancer cell line MCF-7, estradiol caused a dose-dependent decrease in LKB1 transcript and protein expression leading to a significant decrease in the phosphorylation of the LKB1 target AMPK. ERα binds to the STK11 promoter in a ligand-independent manner and this interaction is decreased in the presence of estradiol. Moreover, STK11 promoter activity is significantly decreased in the presence of estradiol.

== Function ==
The STK11/LKB1 gene, which encodes a member of the serine/threonine kinase family, regulates cell polarity and functions as a tumour suppressor.

LKB1 is a primary upstream kinase of adenosine monophosphate-activated protein kinase (AMPK), a necessary element in cell metabolism that is required for maintaining energy homeostasis. It is now clear that LKB1 exerts its growth suppressing effects by activating a group of about 14 other kinases, comprising AMPK and AMPK-related kinases. Activation of AMPK by LKB1 suppresses growth and proliferation when energy and nutrient levels are scarce. Activation of AMPK-related kinases by LKB1 plays vital roles maintaining cell polarity thereby inhibiting inappropriate expansion of tumour cells. A picture from current research is emerging that loss of LKB1 leads to disorganization of cell polarity and facilitates tumour growth under energetically unfavorable conditions. A study in rats showed that LKB1 expression is upregulated in cardiomyocytes after birth and that LKB1 abundance negatively correlates with proliferation of neonatal rat cardiomyocytes.

Loss of LKB1 activity is associated with highly aggressive HER2+ breast cancer. HER2/neu mice were engineered for loss of mammary gland expression of Lkb1 resulting in reduced latency of tumorgenesis. These mice developed mammary tumors that were highly metabolic and hyperactive for MTOR. Pre-clinical studies that simultaneously targeted mTOR and metabolism with AZD8055 (inhibitor of mTORC1 and mTORC2) and 2-DG, respectively inhibited mammary tumors from forming. Mitochondria function In control mice that did not have mammary tumors were not affected by AZD8055/2-DG treatments.

LKB1 catalytic deficient mutants found in Peutz–Jeghers syndrome activate the expression of cyclin D1 through recruitment to response elements within the promoter of the oncogene. LKB1 catalytically deficient mutants have oncogenic properties.

== Clinical significance ==
At least 51 disease-causing mutations in this gene have been discovered. Germline mutations in this gene have been associated with Peutz–Jeghers syndrome, an autosomal dominant disorder characterized by the growth of polyps in the gastrointestinal tract, pigmented macules on the skin and mouth, and other neoplasms. However, the LKB1 gene was also found to be mutated in lung cancer of sporadic origin, predominantly adenocarcinomas. Further, more recent studies have uncovered a large number of somatic mutations of the LKB1 gene that are present in cervical, breast, intestinal, testicular, pancreatic and skin cancer.

LKB1 has been implicated as a potential target for inducing cardiac regeneration after injury as the regenerative potential of cardiomyocytes is limited in adult mammals. Knockdown of Lkb1 in rat cardiomyocytes suppressed phosphorylation of AMPK and activated Yes-associated protein, which subsequently promoted cardiomyocyte proliferation.

== Activation ==
LKB1 is activated allosterically by binding to the pseudokinase STRAD and the adaptor protein MO25. The LKB1-STRAD-MO25 heterotrimeric complex represents the biologically active unit, that is capable of phosphorylating and activating AMPK and at least 12 other kinases that belong to the AMPK-related kinase family. Several novel splice isoforms of STRADα that differentially affect LKB1 activity, complex assembly, subcellular localization of LKB1 and the activation of the LKB1-dependent AMPK pathway.

== Structure ==
The crystal structure of the LKB1-STRAD-MO25 complex was elucidated using X-ray crystallography, and revealed the mechanism by which LKB1 is allosterically activated. LKB1 has a structure typical of other protein kinases, with two (small and large) lobes on either side of the ligand ATP-binding pocket. STRAD and MO25 together cooperate to promote LKB1 active conformation. The LKB1 activation loop, a critical element in the process of kinase activation, is held in place by MO25, thus explaining the huge increase in LKB1 activity in the presence of STRAD and MO25 .

== Splice variants ==
Alternate transcriptional splice variants of this gene have been observed and characterized. There are two main splice isoforms denoted LKB1 long (LKB1_{L}) and LKB1 short (LKB1_{S}). The short LKB1 variant is predominantly found in testes.

== Interactions ==
STK11 has been shown to interact with:

- CDC37,
- FYN
- HSP90AA1
- LYK5
- SMARCA4
- ESR1

== See also ==
- Paola Marignani (living), scientist and university professor, research on tumor suppressor kinase LKB1
