= TS/A =

TS/A is a mouse mammary adenocarcinoma cell line established in the early 1980s from a spontaneous tumor of a retired breeder BALB/c female mouse. In the 1990s it was widely used as a recipient cell line for the transduction of cytokine genes and other genes of immunological interest, to produce recombinant experimental vaccines that induced anti-tumor immunological responses.
