= Validation des Acquis de l'Expérience =

Procedure of granting degrees based on work experience in France

The VAE or Validation des Acquis de l'Expérience is a procedure for the recognition of prior learning that allows any French educational institution to grant degrees partly or completely based on work experience. A portfolio of the applicant's achievements and work experience is presented to a committee at the educational institution. The committee will then decide if the documents presented in the portfolio show work that merits partial credit towards a particular degree. The integrity of the vetting procedure is down to individual institutions, however, to produce a false document in support of an application is a felony punished by a large fine and up to three years in jail in France.

== History ==
A French law, passed August 23, 1985, allowed people with work experience to ask for a Diploma equivalence, but this was mostly for vocational degrees. A significant change came with the Loi de Modernisation Sociale (Law of Social Modernization) dated January 17, 2002, that specifically authorized universities and other "établissements d'Enseignement supérieurs" (higher education institutions) to grant standard degrees (BTS, DEUG, Licence, Maîtrise, DES, DESS, Master, Mastaire, Doctorat, etc.) based only on the work experience of the candidate. The required minimum of work experience was also lowered from five to three years.

== Legal status ==
The VAE is now included in the French Code of Education at Part legislative, Third part, Book VI, Title Ier, Chapter III, Section 2, Art. L613-3 to L613-6. It is important to note that Art L- 613-4 states: "The validation produces the same effects as the knowledge or aptitude testing process that it replaces." The degrees and diplomas obtained through the VAE process are exactly the same and any mention of the VAE is prohibited in order to fight possible unlawful discrimination. The VAE decision is done on file after interview (electronic or physical) by a VAE Jury made of professors belonging to the university.

== Recognition ==
VAE is now law and all French universities must apply it if asked. In 2005, 21,379 students applied for the VAE, 61% were women. 59% received a full degree. Among those, 10% received a degree equivalent or superior to the bachelor's degree. More than 1250 bachelor's or higher degrees were granted through the VAE in 2005 in France (+50%).

In France the VAE is, according to the government website, in full expansion and universally accepted. Internationally, the countries that ratified the Convention on the Recognition of Qualifications concerning Higher Education in the European Region recognize it. In the US, credentials evaluators, universities, federal and state governments also recognize the VAE degrees with the notable exception of the state of Oregon.

== Non-French speaking students ==
The VAE works like the European Erasmus Programme and the Bologna declaration on harmonization of European degrees that allows international students to attend French universities. In 2004 https://www.sorbon.frEcole Supérieure Robert de Sorbon® started VAE in foreign languages (English, Spanish & Italian), followed by several other universities. The validation documents provided to the committee at the university deciding the validation must be in a language that the committee members can read and understand if not in French.It is thanks to the VAE the world most diverse university with online studends from 164 countries.
