= Abominable (soundtrack) =

2019 film soundtrack album

Abominable (Original Motion Picture Soundtrack)

Soundtrack album by Rupert Gregson-Williams
- Released: September 13, 2019
- Studios: AIR Studios, London
- Genres: Film score; film soundtrack
- Length: 61:44
- Label: Back Lot Music
- Producer: Rupert Gregson-Williams

Rupert Gregson-Williams chronology
Hot Air (2019)	Abominable (2019)	Catherine the Great (2019)

Abominable (Original Motion Picture Soundtrack) is the soundtrack album to the 2019 DreamWorks Animation and Pearl Studio film Abominable directed by Jill Culton and featured the voices of Chloe Bennet, Albert Tsai, Tenzing Norgay Trainor, Eddie Izzard, Sarah Paulson, and Tsai Chin. The film score is composed by Rupert Gregson-Williams and released through Back Lot Music on September 13, 2019, two weeks prior to the film's theatrical release.

== Development ==
Rupert Gregson-WIlliams composed the score for Abominable after previously scoring DreamWorks' Over the Hedge (2006) and Bee Movie (2007). Like the other animated projects, Gregson-Williams came earlier for scoring Abominable as he had to write those themes so that animators could animate to the violin music. Culton told him that Yi's violin is like a voice where she can say things with it that she cannot say it with words. After Culton had narrated the story, he sent a piece for the sequence where Everest hums to make the flowers glow and it was in harmony with her violin playing.

Gregson-Williams used his own voice to create the humming sound as Culton persisted him to do so as it felt suitable for Everest's voice and also important to her that the composer "is truly part of the movie in a strong way. It made the effort so much more special that all of us wrapped our arms around this crazy idea of a movie where music and magic are characters." The film features the original songs "Beautiful Life" sung by Bebe Rexha, "Dreams" by Phil Beaudreau, "Girl's Gotta" by Danger Versions, and a modern cover version of "Fix You" by Coldplay.

== Release ==
Back Lot Music released the soundtrack through digital platforms on September 13, 2019, followed by a CD release on October 25.

== Reception ==
Tim Grierson of Screen International considered "Rupert Gregson-Williams' score — particularly its violin passages" as one of the strongest elements. Mark Harrison of Den of Geek said "the film largely thrives on Rupert Gregson-Williams' evocative original score". Susan Granger of Alliance of Women Film Journalists called the music "ethereal". Julian Roman of MovieWeb wrote, "The score by Rupert Gregson-Williams is powerful and affecting. Yi plays the violin throughout the film. These pieces range from hauntingly melodic to rousing. The instrument threads the characters together. It also reinforces several aspects of Chinese culture. Abominable's use of music is key to the story's effectiveness."

Yolanda Machado of TheWrap wrote, "composer Rupert Gregson-Williams' gorgeous use of violins and organs [...] create an atmosphere that, even with the film’s predictable outcome, makes for an enjoyable family experience." Jazz Tangcay of Awards Daily wrote, "The visual beauty of Abominable's storytelling is matched by the Rupert Gregson-Williams' score, elevating the animation to another level. Standing out when Yi plays her violin. Yi carries a photo of her father in her violin case and is intimately connected to the instrument. Whenever she plays, the music sears with love."

== Track listing ==
No.	Title	Artist(s)	Length
1.	"Beautiful Life"	Bebe Rexha	3:23
2.	"Fix You"	Coldplay	4:56
3.	"Dreams"	Phil Beaudreau	3:33
4.	"Girl's Gotta"	Danger Twins	3:04
5.	"Everest Escapes"		2:03
6.	"Yi Has a Dream"		1:28
7.	"Play to the Rooftops"		2:57
8.	"Soda Crate"		1:47
9.	"Everest Hums a Blueberry or Two"		2:00
10.	"Meet Peng and Jin"		2:42
11.	"Bandages and Blankets"		2:11
12.	"Yi and Everest Duet"		2:05
13.	"Burnish"		1:50
14.	"Leaving the City"		1:33
15.	"Burnish Takes Charge"		2:24
16.	"Dandelion Chase"		1:36
17.	"Postcard Journey"		1:59
18.	"The Leshan Buddha"		3:46
19.	"He's Just a Kid"		1:24
20.	"Burnish Does Some Tracking"		2:36
21.	"Starry Night Becomes a Wipe Out"		3:22
22.	"I Really Liked Your Dad"		2:13
23.	"Humming up a Storm"		4:10
24.	"Everest"		2:42
Total length:			61:44

== Awards ==
Awards	Category	Recipient(s)	Result	Ref.
Hollywood Music in Media Awards	Best Original Score – Animated Film	Rupert Gregson-Williams	Nominated	
Hollywood Music in Media Awards	Best Original Song – Animated Film	"Beautiful Lize – written and performed by Bebe Rexha	Won	
