= Keyla Monterroso Mejia =

American actress and comedian

- Born: February 26, 1998 (age 28); Hawthorne, California, U.S.
- Occupations: Actress; comedian
- Years active: 2021–present

Keyla Monterroso Mejia (born February 26, 1998) is an American actress and comedian. She is best known for her roles in the HBO comedy series Curb Your Enthusiasm (2021–2024), the ABC comedy series Abbott Elementary (2022–2026), and the Apple TV+ comedy series The Studio (2025–present).

Mejia also appeared in the films The Estate (2022), Suncoast (2024), One of Them Days (2025), and You're Cordially Invited (2025).

== Early life ==
Keyla Monterroso Mejia was born in Hawthorne, California, in Los Angeles County on February 26, 1998. Her parents were from Guatemala and Mexico. She grew up in the Inland Empire region of California.

== Career ==
Mejia made her professional acting debut playing Val in Ann Marie Pace's 2021 short film Growing Fangs, one of a series of productions featured as part of the Disney+ anthology series Launchpad. The same year, she made her television debut as a guest star on season 11 of the HBO comedy series Curb Your Enthusiasm, playing short order cook-turned terrible actress Maria Sofia Estrada. Originally cast for one episode, she went on to appear in six of the season's ten episodes. She guest starred again in season 12, where her character has become a popular actress.

Also in 2021, Mejia guest starred in the final episode of the Netflix comedy-drama series On My Block. It was later announced she would star in the spin-off series Freeridge, alongside Bryana Salaz, Ciara Riley Wilson, and Tenzing Norgay Trainor. The series premiered in 2023 and ran for one season.

In January 2026, Deadline announced she will join Season 2 of Bad Monkey.

== Filmography ==
=== Film ===
Year	Title	Role	Notes
2021	#Whitina	Belle	Short film
2021	The 90 Day Plan	Lolo	Short film
2022	The Estate	Ellen	
2022	Aguanta	Estefa	Short film
2024	Suncoast	Nurse Mia	
2024	What to Expect	Sofia	Short film
2025	One of Them Days	Kathy	
2025	You're Cordially Invited	Heather	
2026	Diary of a Wimpy Kid Christmas: The Getaway	Receptionist	Voice

=== Television ===
Year	Title	Role	Notes
2021	Launchpad	Val Garcia	Episode: "Growing Fangs"
2021	On My Block	Gloria	Episode: "The Final Chapter"
2021–2024	Curb Your Enthusiasm	Maria Sofia Estrada	7 episodes
2022	Boo, Bitch	Newlifer Girl	3 episodes
2022–2026	Abbott Elementary	Ashley Garcia	5 episodes
2023	Freeridge	Gloria	8 episodes
2025	Running Point	Ana Moreno	2 episodes
2025	The Studio	Petra	5 episodes
2025	Last Week Tonight with John Oliver	Young Controller	Episode: "Air Traffic Control"
2025	Acapulco	Dulce	10 episodes
2026	Scrubs	Mimi	3 episodes
