= Ciara Riley Wilson =

American actress

- Born: March 26, 2001 (age 25); Portland, Oregon, U.S.
- Other name: Ciara Wilson
- Occupation: Actress
- Years active: 2014–present

Ciara Riley Wilson (born March 26, 2001), also known as Ciara Wilson, is an American actress. She is best known for playing Athena in the action comedy film Kim Possible, Letti Ramirez in the drama series L.A.'s Finest and Demi in the teen comedy drama series Freeridge.

== Early life ==
Wilson was born in Portland, Oregon. She is half white, half Filipino. She is currently attending Emerson College in Los Angeles.

== Career ==
Wilsons first big role came in the real life adaption of the Disney Channel TV series Kim Possible. She plays Kim's best friend Athena. Her first big role in a TV show was playing Letti Ramirez in the drama series L.A.'s Finest. Her biggest role so far has been playing Demi in the teen comedy drama series Freeridge.

== Personal life ==
In her spare time she likes sewing, writing poetry, dancing and hanging out with her roommates. Her idols are her dance teachers Sara Anderson, Shelly Misevch, and Karin Kopacz

== Filmography ==
=== Film ===
Year	Title	Role	Notes
2014	9	Ana	Short
2022	Reply	Casey Hughes	Short
2023	FBF	Allison	

=== Video games ===
Year	Title	Role	Notes
2021	For All Mankind: Time Capsule	Lisa	
2021	Neo: The World Ends with You	Tsugumi Matsunae	

=== Television ===
Year	Title	Role	Notes
2014	Henry Danger	Jenna	Episode; "Birthday Girl Down"
2015	Cheerleaders	Ciara Wilson	2 episodes
2016	It's a Snackdown!	Vita Minz	8 episodes
2015–2016	OMG!	Zen Jen, Tara	16 episodes
2016	Bizaardvark	Vicki Fuego	Episode; "Bizaardvark vs Vicki 'Hot Head' Fuego"
2018	Speechless	Alicia Hernandez	Episode; "D-I-- DIMEO A-C-- ACADEMY"
2019	Kim Possible	Athena	Television film
2019	Coop & Cami Ask the World	Tara	4 episodes
2019–2020	L.A.'s Finest	Letti Ramirez	8 episodes
2019–2020	Kim Hushable	Athena	5 episodes
2021	On My Block	Demi	Episode; "The Final Chapter"
2022	Grey's Anatomy	Diamond Thompson	Episode; "Let's Talk About Sex"
2022	Quantum Leap	Leah Valencia	Episode; "Stand By Ben"
2023	Freeridge	Demi	8 episodes
2024	FBI: International	Brie Martindale	Episode; "Gift"
