= Jason Genao =

American actor

- Born: Jason Steven Genao; July 3, 1996 (age 29); Jersey City, New Jersey, US
- Occupation: Actor
- Years active: 2015-present
- Known for: On My Block

Jason Steven Genao (born July 3, 1996) is an American actor. He is best known for his appearance as the character Ruby Martinez on the Netflix show On My Block.

== Biography ==
Genao comes from a Dominican-American family in Jersey City, New Jersey. He has 2 brothers: David and Danny. He graduated from William L. Dickinson High School.

Genao began his acting career in 2015, when he appeared in the comedy film Ladrones. In 2016, Genao appeared in a recurring role–as Napoleon in the Netflix Original series The Get Down.

Genao was cast to play the main role in the teen comedy-drama series On My Block alongside Sierra Capri, Brett Gray and Diego Tinoco, which was released on Netflix on March 16, 2018 and final season which premiered on October 4, 2021.

In 2022, Genao appeared in a recurring role as Devon in the comedy miniseries Boo, Bitch.

In 2023, Genao was cast in the war action thriller film Ambush opposite Jonathan Rhys Meyers, Connor Paolo and Aaron Eckhart, which was released on February 24, 2023.

== Filmography ==
=== Film ===
Year	Title	Role	Notes
2015	Ladrones	Agente FBI	
2017	Logan	Rictor	
2023	Ambush	Boyd	
TBA	Regulars		

=== Television ===
Year	Title	Role	Notes
2016	Law & Order: Special Victims Unit	William Reeves	1 episode: "Forty-One Witnesses"
2016-2017	The Get Down	Napoleon	Netflix Original, 7 episodes
2018–2021	On My Block	Ruby Martinez	Netflix Original, Main cast
2022	Boo, Bitch	Devon	Netflix Original, 5 episodes
