= Abominable and the Invisible City =

American animated television series

- Genre: Adventure; Comedy; Fantasy
- Based on: Characters created by Jill Culton
- Developed by: Katherine Nolfi
- Voices of: Chloe Bennet; Tenzing Norgay Trainor; Ethan Loh; Darin De Paul; Alan Cumming; Michelle Wong; Karen Huie
- Theme music composer: George Shaw
- Composers: George Shaw; Eunike Tanzil
- Country of origin: United States
- Original language: English
- No. of seasons: 2
- No. of episodes: 20

Production
- Executive producer: Jim Schumann
- Running time: 22 minutes
- Production companies: Pearl Studio; DreamWorks Animation Television

Original release
- Network: Peacock; Hulu; Sky Kids
- Release: October 5, 2022 – March 29, 2023

Abominable and the Invisible City is an American animated television series produced by DreamWorks Animation Television. The series acts as a follow-up to the 2019 film, Abominable on which it was based, which was co-produced by Pearl Studio, and continues Yi's adventures to a mythical world of creatures beyond Everest, a yeti she befriended and joins her along with Jin and Peng to the new world. Chloe Bennett (who also serves as consulting producer for the show), Tenzing Norgay Trainor, and Michelle Wong reprise their respective roles as Yi, Jin, and Mei, while Ethan Loh, Darin De Paul, Alan Cumming, and Karen Huie voice Peng, Everest, Burnish, and Nai Nai, respectively, replacing Albert Tsai, Joseph Izzo, Eddie Izzard, and Tsai Chin from the original film.

The series premiered on October 5, 2022, with 10 episodes on Peacock and Hulu. A second and final season was released on March 29, 2023.

== Premise ==
After the events of the film, Yi, Jin, and Peng know that there's a whole magical world out there and discover that their surroundings are teeming with magical creatures in need of their help. With the help of their old yeti friend Everest, they'll set out on a journey throughout their city and beyond.

== Cast ==
- Chloe Bennet as Yi, the headstrong, empathetic leader of the Creature Brigade and a skilled violin player.
- Tenzing Norgay Trainor as Jin, Yi's millennial friend and Peng's older cousin who aspires to go to medical school and become a doctor. However, by the events of season 2, he willingly gives up this dream to focus more on studying creatures.
- Ethan Loh as Peng, Yi's mischievous, fun-loving friend and Jin's younger cousin. He was originally voiced by Albert Tsai in the original film.
- Darin De Paul as Everest, a Yeti who is friends with Yi, Jin, and Peng. He was originally voiced by Joseph Izzo in the original film, while his vocals were provided by the film's composer Rupert Gregson-Williams.
- Alan Cumming as Burnish, the elderly, wealthy head of Burnish Industries and a former enemy to Yi and her friends. He was originally voiced by Eddie Izzard in the original film.
- Michelle Wong as Mei, Yi's mother.
- Karen Huie as Nai Nai, Yi's maternal grandmother. She was originally voiced by Tsai Chin in the original film.

Vic Chao, Stephanie Sheh, Caleb Yen, Natalie Chan, Donald Chang, Kara Wang and Harrison Xu provided additional voices.

== Episodes ==
=== Series overview ===
Season	Episodes	Originally released
1	10	October 5, 2022
2	10	March 29, 2023

=== Season 1 (2022) ===
No. overall	No. in season	Title	Directed by	Written by	Storyboarded by	Original release date
1	1	"Everest Returns"	Jim Schumann	Katherine Nolfi	Emmanuel Deligiannis, Amelia Kasten, Ruolin Li and Laurianne Uy	October 5, 2022
2	2	"Welcome Home, Everest!"	Ruolin Li	Tiffany Lo & Ethel Lung	Amelia Kasten and Laurianne Uy	October 5, 2022
3	3	"Sewer Koi and the Museum Heist"	Kevin Wotton	Katherine Nolfi	Anne Yi, Darwin Tan and Hayden Morris	October 5, 2022
4	4	"Peng vs. Peng"	Lianne Hughes	Tiffany Lo & Ethel Lung	Adam Murphy, Ian Young and Quyth Truong	October 5, 2022
5	5	"Jin's New Look"	Ruolin Li	Tiffany So & Saba Saghafi	Amelia Kasten and Laurianne Uy	October 5, 2022
6	6	"A Cabbage Kinda Day"	Kevin Wotton	Annie Nishida	Anne Yi, Darwin Tan and Hayden Morris	October 5, 2022
7	7	"Yeti Supersitious"	Lianne Hughes & Pete Jacobs	Andi Shu Hester	Adam Murphy, Ian Young and Quyth Truong	October 5, 2022
8	8	"Toad-al Recall"	Ruolin Li	Kyel White	Amelia Kasten and Laurianne Uy	October 5, 2022
9	9	"Chinese Nian Year"	Pete Jacobs	Tiffany Lo & Ethel Lung	Adam Murphy, Ian Young and Quyth Truong	October 5, 2022
10	10	"Chinese Nian Year"	Kevin Wotton	Tiffany Lo & Ethel Lung	Anne Yi, Darwin Tan and Hayden Morris	October 5, 2022

=== Season 2 (2023) ===
No. overall	No. in season	Title	Directed by	Written by	Storyboarded by	Original release date
11	1	"Wu You Gonna Call?"	Ruolin Li	Kyel White	Amelia Kasten and Laurianne Uy	March 29, 2023
12	2	"The Ditch Sitch"	Kevin Wotton	Elizabeth Chun	Anne Yi, Darwin Tan, Hayden Morris and Mark Sonntag	March 29, 2023
13	3	"Tales from the Fox’s Tails"	Pete Jacobs	Tiffany Lo & Ether Lung	Adam Murphy, Ian Young, Quynh Truong and Mark Sonntag	March 29, 2023
14	4	"Yi’s LiLi-est Fan"	Ruolin Li	Kyel White	Amelia Kasten and Laurianne Uy	March 29, 2023
15	5	"Qilin-mania"	Kevin Wotton	Elizabeth Chun	Anne Yi, Darwin Tan and Hayden Morris	March 29, 2023
16	6	"Shack Attack"	Pete Jacobs	Tiffany Lo & Ethel Lung	Adam Murphy, Ian Young, Mark Sonntag and Quynh Truong	March 29, 2023
17	7	"We Meat Again"	Ruolin Li	Kyel White	Amelia Kasten and Laurianne Uy	March 29, 2023
18	8	"A Hair-ifying Night"	Kevin Wotton	Elizabeth Chun	Anne Yi, Andries Martiz, Darwin Tan and Hayden Morris	March 29, 2023
19	9	"Please Hold for the Next Representative"	Pete Jacobs	Tiffany Lo & Ethel Lung	Adam Murphy, Andries Martiz, Darwin Tan and Quynh Truong	March 29, 2023
20	10	"Please Hold While We Connect You"	Ruolin Li	Tiffany Lo & Ethel Lung	Amelia Kasten and Laurianne Uy	March 29, 2023

== Production ==
On February 11, 2022, it was announced that Peacock had ordered a CG animated series from DreamWorks Animation Television serving as a follow up to the film, titled Abominable and the Invisible City. The series chronicles Yi, Jin and Peng learning more about Everest and the magical creatures of the world. Spirit Riding Free producers Jim Schumann and Katherine Nolfi executive produced the series, Tiffany Lo and Ethel Lung served as story editors, and Bennet and Trainor reprised their roles of Yi and Jin from the film with Alan Cumming replacing Izzard as Burnish. In addition to Bennett respiring her role, she became an consulting producer on the show as well.

To create the creatures featured in the show, Tiffany Lo and Ethel Lung both grew up hearing about the magical creatures, taking stories they'd heard as children and bring these creatures to life the way they've imagined them for years.

Animation services was provided by CGCG from Jurassic World Camp Cretaceous rather than Technicolor Animation Productions.

== Broadcast ==
Outside the United States, it aired on DreamWorks Channel Asia in 2023. The series premiered on PIE Channel in Philippines on September 11, 2023, Family Channel in Canada, Sky Kids and Sky Showcase in United Kingdom, Rai Gulp in Italy, Clan in Spain, Canal Panda in Portugal, Canal+ Kids in France, La Trois in Belgium, RTS 1 in Switzerland, Super RTL in Germany, e.tv in South Africa in 2023.

== Accolades ==
The first episode "Everest Returns" won for Best Animated Television/Broadcast Production for Children at the 50th Annie Awards.
