= On My Block =

American television series

- Genre: Teen drama; Comedy drama
- Created by: Lauren Iungerich; Eddie Gonzalez; Jeremy Haft
- Starring: Sierra Capri; Jason Genao; Brett Gray; Diego Tinoco; Jessica Marie Garcia; Julio Macias; Peggy Blow
- Composer: KOVAS
- Country of origin: United States
- Original languages: English; Spanish
- No. of seasons: 4
- No. of episodes: 38

Production
- Executive producers: Lauren Iungerich; Eddie Gonzalez; Jeremy Haft; Jamie Dooner
- Producers: Robert Sudduth; Hal Olofsson; Arlyn Richardson; David Berke; Sonia Kharkar; Adam Starks
- Cinematography: Joe Kessler; Tommy Maddox-Upshaw; Tarin Anderson; Eric Koretz; Kris Denton; Steve Gainer
- Camera setup: Single-camera
- Running time: 23–38 minutes
- Production company: Crazy Cat Lady Productions

Original release
- Network: Netflix
- Release: March 16, 2018 – October 4, 2021

Related
- Freeridge

On My Block is an American teen comedy-drama television series, created by Lauren Iungerich, Eddie Gonzalez, and Jeremy Haft. Set in the fictional Los Angeles neighborhood Freeridge, it revolves around four teenagers who find their friendship tested upon entering high school. It stars Sierra Capri, Jason Genao, Brett Gray, Diego Tinoco, Jessica Marie Garcia.

The first season, consisting of ten episodes, was released on Netflix on March 16, 2018. On April 13, 2018, the series was renewed for a second season and it premiered on March 29, 2019. On April 29, 2019, the series was renewed for a third season which premiered on March 11, 2020. On January 29, 2021, the series was renewed for a fourth and final season which premiered on October 4, 2021.

On My Block received positive reviews from critics, who praised the diverse cast, performances, and storylines. The series won Choice Breakout TV Show at the 2018 Teen Choice Awards, and earned nominations from the Black Reel Awards and the Imagen Awards.

== Premise ==
In the fictional rough inner-city Los Angeles neighborhood of Freeridge, four teens find their lifelong friendship tested as they begin high school.

== Cast and characters ==
=== Main ===
- Sierra Capri as Monsé Finnie, a headstrong Afro-Latina tomboy, who serves as the leader of her friend group. Raised by her single father, she is in love with one of her best friends, Cesar.
- Jason Genao as Ruben "Ruby" Martinez Jr., a smart-aleck math whiz of Mexican descent often serving as the group's conscience
- Brett Gray as Jamal Turner, the nerd of the group, who is African-American. In season 1, he is drawn into finding a hidden treasure scheme surrounding RollerWorld.
- Diego Tinoco as Cesar Diaz, an intelligent Latino teen forced into gang life once his brother is released from prison, putting a strain on a blossoming relationship with Monsé.
- Jessica Marie Garcia as Jasmine Flores (seasons 2–4; recurring season 1), a classmate of the group, who has a romantic obsession with Ruby. She and Ruby start a relationship during Season 3.
- Julio Macias as Oscar "Spooky" Diaz (seasons 3–4; recurring seasons 1–2), Cesar's older brother and a high-level member of the Santos gang.
- Peggy Blow as Marisol "Abuelita" Martinez (season 4; recurring season 1–3), Ruby's grandmother.

=== Recurring ===
- Ronni Hawk as Olivia (season 1), a friend of Ruby's family who moves in with them after her parents are deported, and Ruby's love interest. She is shot by Latrelle and dies in the season 1 finale.
- Jahking Guillory as Latrelle (season 1–2; guest season 4), a former classmate of the group and a member of the Prophet$, a longtime rival gang to the Santos
- Emilio Rivera as Chivo (season 1–2, 4), (season 3, voice only), a gardener and former Santos gang member caught up in Jamal's hidden treasure scheme
- Paula Garcés as Geny Martinez, Ruby's mother
- Eric Neil Gutierrez as Ruben Martinez, Ruby's father
- Danny Ramirez as Mario Martinez (season 1–2), Ruby's older brother
- Kylie Samaniego as Luisa Martinez (season 1–2), Ruby's little sister
- Julian Lerma as Luis Martinez (season 1–2), Ruby's little brother
- Reggie Austin as Monty Finnie, Monsé's father. A truck driver, mostly on the road away from Monsé to work
- Lisa Marcos as Selena "Julia" Whitman (season 1–2), Monsé's biological mother who left at a young age, and reconnected with in season 2
- Eme Ikwuakor as Dwayne Turner, Jamal's father. Former Freeridge High School football player and owner of Dwayne's Joint, a local restaurant
- Raushanah Simmons as Mrs. Turner, Jamal's mother
- Rob Murat as Coach Ron (season 1–2, 4), the Freeridge High School football coach and Sex Ed teacher
- Angela E. Gibbs as Rosé Westbrook (season 1, 3), a former Soul Train dancer caught up in Jamal's hidden treasure scheme. Former best friend of Stacy, aka Cuchillos, leader of the Santos.
- Shoshana Bush as Amber (season 2; guest season 4), Mario's girlfriend.
- Ada Luz Pla as Cuchillos (season 3), the leader of the Santos before her death
- Mallory James Mahoney as Ainsley Riches (season 3)
- Gilberto Ortiz as Cuete (season 3–4), a 19th Street gang member
- Troy Leigh-Anne Johnson as Kendra (season 3; guest season 4), Jamal's love interest
- Ian Casselberry as Ray (season 3–4), Cesar and Spooky's father. Former Santos gang member before going to prison when Cesar and Spooky were kids. Worked at Dwayne's Joint after his release.
- Nikki Rodriguez as Vero (season 4), Cesar's girlfriend
- Andrea Cortés as Isabel (season 4), Oscar's wife

== Episodes ==
=== Series overview ===
Season	Episodes	Originally released
1	10	March 16, 2018
2	10	March 29, 2019
3	8	March 11, 2020
4	10	October 4, 2021

=== Season 1 (2018) ===
No. overall	No. in season	Title	Directed by	Written by	Original release date
1	1	"Chapter One"	Lauren Iungerich	Jeremy Haft & Eddie Gonzalez & Lauren Iungerich	March 16, 2018
In the neighborhood of Freeridge, four best friends, Ruby, Cesar, Monsé and Jamal are almost at the start of their high school life when Cesar is on the outs by Ruby and Jamal. Monsé, having been at a writing camp for three months, looks for the reason of the fight which is revealed to be Cesar's confession of Monsé and Cesar's secret love affair. Monsé confronts Cesar, who did this only to protect her from his brother, Oscar, who has been bailed out of prison and is forcing him to join his gang. Jamal lies to his parents about his interest in the football team as he is only interested in finding a large sum of stolen money that was hidden in the neighborhood. With Cesar and Monsé's affair being real, both agree to keep it a secret from other two.
2	2	"Chapter Two"	Lauren Iungerich	Lauren Iungerich	March 16, 2018
To save Cesar from falling into Oscar's hands, Monsé encourages Ruby and Jamal to co-operate. Ruby is left out to talk Oscar into letting Cesar go because of his extraordinary skills of manipulating people by talking. Instead of budging, Oscar decides to harden on Cesar. Meanwhile, Ruby's parents welcome Olivia, a friend of the family, in their home. Ruby eventually falls for her and she becomes a part of the group.
3	3	"Chapter Three"	Steven Tsuchida	Robert Sudduth	March 16, 2018
As Monsé and Cesar continue their relationship, they are faced with the challenge of the homecoming dance in their school to which Monse is reluctant. Cesar starts doing Oscar's crimes at his order. Ruby tries his best to get him partnered with Olivia to dance. Jamal takes the help of Ruby's grandmother, Marisol, to get a clue of the stolen money. With Marisol's tip, Jamal finds the address of Frankie's girlfriend in Brentwood, Frankie being one of those who carried out the heist. The homecoming dance is cancelled because of an incident in front of the school. Cesar makes everyone crash at Monsé's place. Monsé declares Cesar to be unsafe in front of Olivia, which upsets him.
4	4	"Chapter Four"	Steven Tsuchida	Eddie Gonzalez & Jeremy Haft	March 16, 2018
On Halloween, Jamal encourages the group to trick-or-treat in Brentwood. As Ruby, Cesar and Olivia go trick-or-treating, Jamal and Monsé follow Marisol's lead. They meet Rosé, Frankie's girlfriend and a former Soul Train dancer. She tells them about Li'l Rickey, Frankie's best friend who Jamal deduces might be the one who hid the money. Monsé encounters a lady who she suspects to be her mother who left when she was young. After getting back to Freeridge, Olivia kisses Cesar.
5	5	"Chapter Five"	Ryan Shiraki	Jamie Uyeshiro	March 16, 2018
Ruby realizes that Olivia is not into him. Cesar tells Jamal about his kiss with Olivia. Jamal, being self-confessing, gives him a time limit for how long he can hold this secret. As Ruby calls Jamal at his place, Olivia also invites Monsé over. While the neighborhood goes on a lock-down, Cesar runs for his life being followed by their gang rival, the Prophets. As Oscar appears at Ruby's place, it is clear that the lock-down is in lieu for his search so he hides there. As Jamal's time limit is about to end, Cesar makes it to Ruby's house but he is too late before Olivia told the group about their kiss, to everyone's astonishment.
6	6	"Chapter Six"	Ryan Shiraki	Adam Starks & Francesca Gailes	March 16, 2018
After the reveal, Ruby and Monsé are not on speaking terms with Cesar. Jamal takes Ruby's help in convincing the coach to let him sit on the bench during the football game. While Olivia patches things up between Ruby, Monsé, and Cesar, Jamal is forced on the ground when half of his team is sent off. To everyone's surprise, Jamal wins the match. He confesses to his parents that he does not like football to which they unexpectedly consent.
7	7	"Chapter Seven"	Steven Tsuchida	Lauren Iungerich	March 16, 2018
Cesar is forced by Monsé to continue having an affair with Olivia for the sake of the group's unity. Olivia tells the group about her upcoming quinceañera at which Ruby gets obsessed in conducting it. Jamal's search for the stolen money, commonly known as RollerWorld money, leads to a gardener, Chivo, who also turns out to be Li'l Ricky's cousin. He finds a key in one of his garden gnomes. While Cesar asks Monsé to continue their relationship, Latrelle, a member of the Prophets, pulls a gun on him. Monsé asks Jamal for the RollerWorld money to get Cesar out of town.
8	8	"Chapter Eight"	Steven Tsuchida	Eddie Gonzalez & Jeremy Haft & Lauren Iungerich	March 16, 2018
Monsé babysits for her suspected mother, Julia's children as she works on a book based on her personal experiences. When Julia sees the photo of Monsé's father on her phone, she sobs, confirming she is Monsé's mother. Oscar spends quality time with Cesar on a beach which turns out to be a motivation for him to kill Latrelle but they miss the chance. Jamal finds out that the key he found is actually to an outhouse outside Chivo's nursery. On unlocking, he finds many locked boxes.
9	9	"Chapter Nine"	Lauren Iungerich	Eddie Gonzalez & Jeremy Haft	March 16, 2018
Jamal seeks help from Monse and Ruby with the boxes. They find a clue in of them which leads them to the park. Ruby suggests sending Cesar to a distant farm through a bus but Jamal insists on finding the money. After a series of frantic checkpoints, the group, along with Marisol, end up in a church where they find a box full of gold coins which actually turn out to be chocolates. Ruby and Monse fight with Jamal on the failure. Cesar, losing hope, pulls a gun on Latrelle.
10	10	"Chapter Ten"	Lauren Iungerich	Lauren Iungerich	March 16, 2018
At Olivia's quinceañera, Cesar unexpectedly shows up, revealing he let Latrelle go. Jamal still looks for more clues and ends up in the football field. Olivia, discovering about Cesar and Monse's affair, and realizing her love for Ruby, willingly breaks up with Cesar. After shoveling the ground and nearly losing hope, Jamal decides to dig it. Meanwhile, Latrelle appears at the quinceañera with a gun. Ruby foresees him while dancing with Olivia and moves in front of Cesar to save him. Latrelle shoots and the bullet passes through both him and Olivia. Latrelle then evades the scene. Ambulances carry them to hospital as Jamal is revealed to have found the money.

=== Season 2 (2019) ===
No. overall	No. in season	Title	Directed by	Written by	Original release date
11	1	"Chapter Eleven"	Lauren Iungerich	Lauren Iungerich	March 29, 2019
A month after the previous events, it is revealed that Olivia died due to the gunshot. Ruby wakes up from coma and is still traumatized by Olivia's death. His brother, Mario, returns home from his internship with his white girlfriend, Amber. Amber turns out to be pregnant with his baby, to his family's disappointment. Oscar's gang, the Santos, call a truce with the Prophets following previous events. Cesar is kicked out of the gang by Oscar for not killing Latrelle. Monse's father, Monty, bans Cesar from his property, as does Geny, Ruby's mother. Monty asks Monse to promise him that she won't have Cesar at their house and, as a result, Cesar becomes homeless.
12	2	"Chapter Twelve"	Lauren Iungerich	Eddie Gonzalez & Jeremy Haft	March 29, 2019
Jamal panics when he finds out his mother has given away his football bag, which actually had the money in it, to Goodwill. He seeks help from Monse and Cesar and successfully finds the money in one of the Goodwill bins. Because of a fight on the money's possession, they fall in trouble with Officer Hammel. With their annoying classmate Jasmine's help, who is a member of The Explorer program at the police station, they distract him and save the money. Ruby, now in the second stage of grief, anger, bonds unexpectedly with Oscar. Jamal takes the money to his house but finds Coach Ron there who sues him for the dug up football field. Monse, keeping the promise with her father, lets Cesar sleep in his car.
13	3	"Chapter Thirteen"	Ryan Shiraki	Jamie Uyeshiro	March 29, 2019
14	4	"Chapter Fourteen"	Ryan Shiraki	Christopher Encell	March 29, 2019
15	5	"Chapter Fifteen"	Jeremy Haft	Eddie Gonzalez & Jeremy Haft	March 29, 2019
16	6	"Chapter Sixteen"	Erica Watson	Lauren Iungerich	March 29, 2019
17	7	"Chapter Seventeen"	Ryan Shiraki	Sonia Kharkar	March 29, 2019
18	8	"Chapter Eighteen"	Ryan Shiraki	Adam Starks	March 29, 2019
19	9	"Chapter Nineteen"	Lauren Iungerich	Eddie Gonzalez & Jeremy Haft	March 29, 2019
20	10	"Chapter Twenty"	Lauren Iungerich	Lauren Iungerich	March 29, 2019

=== Season 3 (2020) ===
No. overall	No. in season	Title	Directed by	Written by	Original release date
21	1	"Chapter Twenty-One"	Lauren Iungerich	Lauren Iungerich	March 11, 2020
22	2	"Chapter Twenty-Two"	Lauren Iungerich	Eddie Gonzalez & Jeremy Haft	March 11, 2020
23	3	"Chapter Twenty-Three"	Valerie Finkel	Jamie Uyeshiro	March 11, 2020
24	4	"Chapter Twenty-Four"	Jeremy Haft	Christopher Encell	March 11, 2020
25	5	"Chapter Twenty-Five"	Ryan Shiraki	Lauren Iungerich	March 11, 2020
26	6	"Chapter Twenty-Six"	Ryan Shiraki	Sonia Kharkar & Adam Starks	March 11, 2020
27	7	"Chapter Twenty-Seven"	Lauren Iungerich	Eddie Gonzalez & Jeremy Haft	March 11, 2020
28	8	"Chapter Twenty-Eight"	Lauren Iungerich	Lauren Iungerich & Auriel Rudnick	March 11, 2020

=== Season 4 (2021) ===
No. overall	No. in season	Title	Directed by	Written by	Original release date
29	1	"Chapter Twenty-Nine"	Lauren Iungerich	Lauren Iungerich	October 4, 2021
30	2	"Chapter Thirty"	Paula Garcés	Eddie Gonzalez & Jeremy Haft	October 4, 2021
Monse returns to Freeridge, seeing so much had changed over the two years she left. Her father is married and has a kid, but also that her friends have split up over that time. Jamal is now part of the football team, and is soaking up the popularity that comes with it. While Ruby and Jasmine are official, but are in a rough patch as he tries to be Senior class president. Cesar is now the leader of the gang full time after taking Oscar's place. Before long, another mystery arises that forces the former friends to confront each other for the first time in years.
31	3	"Chapter Thirty-One"	Alexi Gonzalez	Sonia Kharkar	October 4, 2021
32	4	"Chapter Thirty-Two"	Arlyn Richardson	Jamie Uyeshiro	October 4, 2021
33	5	"Chapter Thirty-Three"	Jeremy Haft	Adam Starks	October 4, 2021
34	6	"Chapter Thirty-Four"	Jeremy Haft	Eddie Gonzalez & Jeremy Haft	October 4, 2021
35	7	"Chapter Thirty-Five"	Valerie Finkel	Vivian Huang	October 4, 2021
36	8	"Chapter Thirty-Six"	Valerie Finkel	Jamie Uyeshiro, Sonia Kharkar & Adam Starks	October 4, 2021
37	9	"Chapter Thirty-Seven"	Eli Gonda	Eddie Gonzalez & Jeremy Haft	October 4, 2021
38	10	"The Final Chapter"	Lauren Iungerich	Lauren Iungerich	October 4, 2021

== Reception ==
=== Critical response ===
Review aggregator Rotten Tomatoes gave the first season an approval rating of 95% based on 22 reviews, and a weighted average rating of 7.83/10. The website's critics consensus reads, "Charming, realistic, and focused on underrepresented communities, On My Block is the respite from stylized teen dramas you didn't know you needed.". Metacritic, which uses a weighted average, assigned a score of 69 out of 100 based on 5 critics, indicating "generally favorable reviews". Trey Mangum of Shadow and Act wrote, "On My Block is different than anything we've seen on television in relation to the experience of growing up. The stars are young people of color, dealing with real issues that happen in communities that they have to wrangle with during this pivotal time in their lives. For a lovely story about friendship and timely societal issues, along with superb youth acting, here is your next binge." Alexis Gunderson of Paste said, "When the final credits hit, it's clear that not one second of the season's 10 short episodes was wasted: Every line was measured out, every background track meticulously calibrated, every initially jarring tonal shift set up precisely for a singular cumulative effect that lands in the season's final moments like a punch to the chest you realize too late you should have seen coming from a mile away." Matt Seitz of New York Magazine wrote, "One of the many remarkable things about this series is how it folds crime and the awareness of potential violence into everyday life, which is something white sitcoms never do unless it's a Very Special Episode."

The second season has a 100% approval rating on Rotten Tomatoes, based on 9 reviews, with an average rating of 7.9/10. The third season holds an approval rating of 91% approval rating on Rotten Tomatoes, based on 11 reviews, with an average rating of 8/10. The website's critics consensus states, "On My Block still rings true in a buoyant third season that interweaves joy and peril with the series' signature authenticity."

=== Awards and nominations ===
Award	Year (Note: Indicates the year of ceremony. Each year is linked to the article about the awards held that year, wherever possible.)	Category	Nominated work	Result	Ref.
Black Reel Awards	2019	Outstanding Comedy Series	On My Block	Nominated	
Imagen Awards	2019	Best Primetime Television Program	On My Block	Nominated	
Imagen Awards	2019	Best Actor – Television	Diego Tinoco	Nominated	
Imagen Awards	2019	Best Actor – Television	Jason Genao	Nominated	
Imagen Awards	2019	Best Supporting Actor – Television	Julio Macias	Nominated	
Imagen Awards	2020	Best Supporting Actor – Television	Julio Macias	Nominated	
Teen Choice Awards	2018	Choice Breakout TV Show	On My Block	Won	
Teen Choice Awards	2019	Choice Summer TV Actor	Diego Tinoco	Nominated	
Teen Choice Awards	2019	Choice Summer TV Actress	Jessica Marie Garcia	Nominated	

== Spinoff ==
On September 27, 2021, a spinoff of On My Block, titled as Freeridge was ordered to series by Netflix. It is created by Lauren Iungerich, Eddie Gonzalez, Jeremy Haft, Jamie Uyeshiro, and Jamie Dooner. It was announced in October 2021 that the series would star Bryana Salaz, Keyla Monterroso Mejia, Ciara Riley Wilson and Shiv Pai. The series premiered on February 2, 2023.
