= 2020 Imagen Awards =

35th Annual Imagen Awards

- Date: September 24, 2020
- Location: Los Angeles, California, USA
- Hosted by: Aida Rodriguez
- Website: www.imagen.org/awards/

Television/radio coverage
- Network: TYT.com

The 35th Annual Imagen Awards, presented by the Imagen Foundation to honor Latino talent and contributions within television and film, were held on September 24, 2020, with the winners announced via a live-stream ceremony on TYT.com.

== Winners and nominees ==
Winners of the Imagen Awards in 2020 for each category are listed first, in boldface.

=== Film ===
Best Feature Film	Best Director - Feature Film
**Dora and the Lost City of Gold**; I Carry You with Me; Las Pildoras de mi Novio; Sergio	**James Bobin**, Dora and the Lost City of Gold; Heidi Ewing, I Carry You with Me; Andy Muschietti, It Chapter Two
Best Actor - Feature Film	Best Actress - Feature Film
**Wagner Moura**, Sergio; Jaime Camil, Las Pildoras de mi Novio; Eugenio Derbez, Dora and the Lost City of Gold; Armando Espitia, I Carry You with Me; Michael Garza, Scary Stories to Tell in the Dark; Al Madrigal, The Way Back; Adrian Martinez, Lady and The Tramp	**Jennifer Lopez**, Hustlers, and; **Isabela Merced**, Dora and the Lost City of Gold; Ana de Armas, Knives Out; Priscilla Star Diaz, Release; Sandra Echeverría, Las Pildoras de mi Novio; Eiza Gonzalez, Bloodshot

=== Television ===
Best Primetime Program – Drama	Best Primetime Program – Comedy
**Law & Order: Special Victims Unit**; Good Trouble; Mayans M.C.; Narcos: Mexico; Pose; Queen of the South	**Mr. Iglesias**; ANA; El juego de las llaves; Gentefied; Little America; One Day at a Time
Best Primetime Program: Special, Movie or Limited Series	Best Director – Television
**Into the Dark: Culture Shock**; Collisions; Live in Front of a Studio Audience: ‘All in the Family’ and ‘Good Times'	**Norberto Barba**, Better Call Saul; Miguel Arteta, Room 104; Steven Canals, Pose; Aurora Guerrero, Little America; Gigi Saul Guerrero, Into the Dark: Culture Shock; Ben Hernandez Bray, Queen of the South; Tanya Saracho, Vida; Batan Silva, Law & Order: SVU
Best Actor – Television	Best Actress – Television
**Diego Luna**, Narcos: Mexico; Arturo Castro, Flipped; Jesse Garcia, Collisions; Gabriel Iglesias, Mr. Iglesias; JD Pardo, Mayans M.C.; Carlos Santos, Gentefied; J.J. Soria, Gentefied	**Jearnest Corchado**, Little America; Alice Braga, Queen of the South; Justina Machado, Family Pictures; Justina Machado, One Day at a Time; Mishel Prada, Vida; Mj Rodriguez, Pose; Gina Torres, Pearson
Best Supporting Actor – Television	Best Supporting Actress – Television
**John Ortiz**, Little America; Arturo Castro, Room 104; Guillermo Diaz, Law & Order: SVU; Fabrizio Guido, Mr. Iglesias; Julio Macias, On My Block; Hemky Madera, Queen of the South; Edward James Olmos, Mayans M.C.	**Manni L. Perez**, Law & Order: Special Victims Unit; Lisseth Chavez, Chicago P.D.; Cote de Pablo, N.C.I.S.; Melissa Fumero, Elena of Avalor; Isabella Gomez, One Day at a Time; Rita Moreno, One Day at a Time; Chelsea Rendon, Vida; Cristina Umaña, Tom Clancy’s Jack Ryan
Best Young Actor – Television
**Izabella Alvarez**, Collisions; Izabella Alvarez, The Casagrandes; Isaac Arellanes, Ghostwriter; Paulina Chávez, Ashley Garcia: Genius in Love; Tess Romero, Diary of a Future President; Justin Sanchez, Ghostwriter

=== Additional Winners ===
Best Variety or Reality Show	Best Children's Programming
**Pati's Mexican Table**; America’s Most Musical Family; De viaje con los Derbez; Gordon Ramsay: Uncharted; Jerry Garcia: It’s Not My Weekend; Total Bellas	**Elena of Avalor**; Ashley Garcia: Genius in Love; The Casagrandes; DuckTales; Ghostwriter; Sesame Street’s 50th Anniversary Special; Vampirina
Best Documentary	Best Informational Program
**Sea of Shadows**; Colossus; The First Rainbow Coalition; Home: Mexico; POV: The Silence of Others; Torn Apart: Separated at the Border; VOCES: Porvenir, Texas	**VOCES Season 5**; Activate: The Global Citizen Movement – ‘Education Cannot Wait; Dylan Reales: El Loco Del Palo; Life Connected; SC Reportajes: Caballitos de Totora; VICE News Tonight; Wyatt Cenac’s Problem Areas
Best Short Film	Best Commercial Advertisement or Social Awareness Campaign
**Acuitzeramo**	**DIY Girls**; Chain of Heroes; Entre Latinos – “Domingo”; Hazte Contar
Best Music Composition for Film or Television	Best Music Supervision for Film or Television
**Angélica Negrón**, Independent Lens; Andrés Sanchez Maher, Gus Reyes, and Emilio Acevedo, Los Espookys; Joey Newman, Diary of a Future President	**Javier Índice Nuño** and **Joe Rodriguez**, Los Espookys; Janet Lopez, Diary of a Future President
Best Web Series	Best Student Film:
**Thanks a Million**	**Milk Teeth**
