= Thembi Banks =

American filmmaker

Thembi L. Banks is an American filmmaker. She directed the 2023 feature film Young. Wild. Free., which is her feature directorial debut. She has been nominated for an Emmy for her work in Only Murders in the Building.

In 2020, it was reported that Banks was to have directed a horror comedy film titled Juju. In 2021, it was reported that Banks had signed on to direct the film Assisted Living starring Cardi B for Paramount Players.

Banks is a native of New York.

Assisted Living was canceled after its star Cardi B pulled out in 2022.
