= Aparna Brielle =

American actress (born 1994)

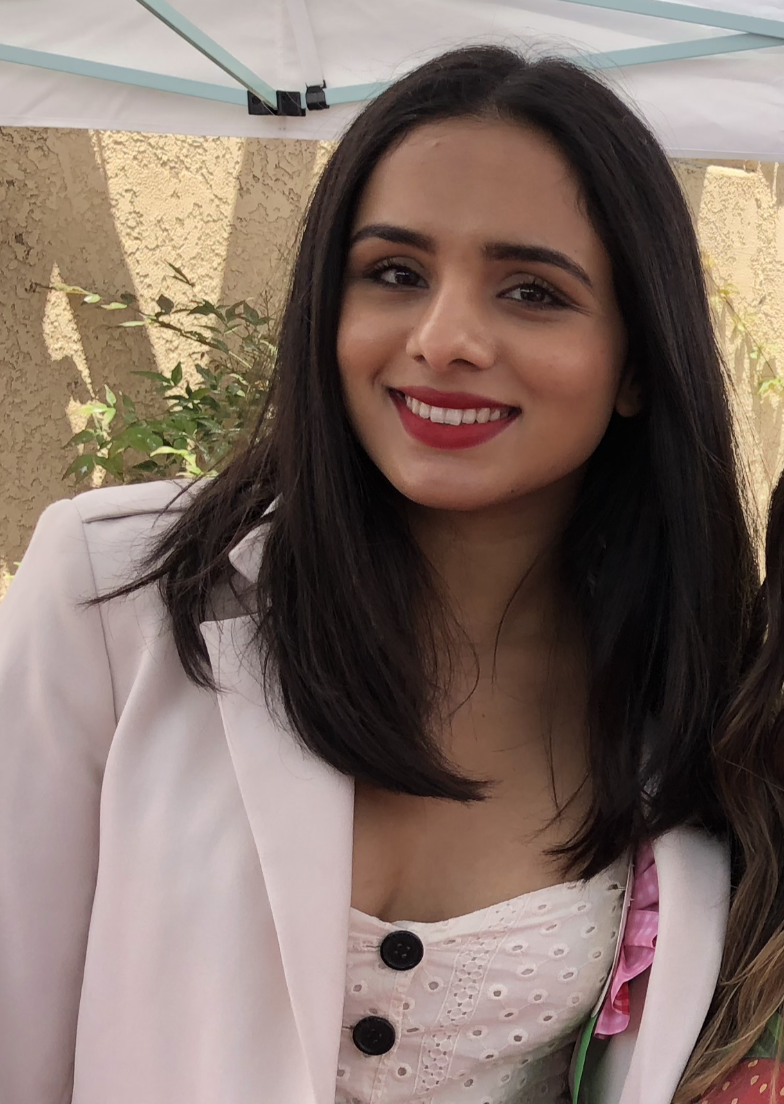
- Brielle in 2018
- Born: Aparna Parthasarathy; February 5, 1994 (age 32); Clackamas, Oregon, U.S.
- Education: Linfield College
- Occupation: Actress
- Years active: 2011–present

Aparna Brielle (born Aparna Parthasarathy on February 5, 1994) is an American actress. She is known for her roles as Sarika Sarkar on the NBC/Peacock comedy series A.P. Bio (2019–2021) and as Tina Mukerji in the Netflix action comedy series FUBAR (2023–2025).

== Early life ==
Aparna Brielle was born in Clackamas, Oregon to Indian American Tamil couple Partha Rajagopal and Girija Parthasarathy, and was raised in the Cedar Mill area of the Portland, Oregon, metropolitan area. She has one younger brother, Vijay. As a child, she attended Valley Catholic School (then known as St. Mary of the Valley) in Beaverton, Oregon.

At the age of nine, after just three years of training, Brielle was amongst the youngest Bharatanatyam dancers in the world to graduate in an Arangetram performance. She attended the Arts & Communications High School, appearing in performances such as their fall 2011 production of Godspell, still performing under her birth name. She then attended Linfield College, where she majored in marketing.

== Career ==
In 2014, Brielle made her television debut on NBC's supernatural drama Grimm. In 2015, she appeared in TNT's The Librarians and in 2016, she appeared in Fox's short-lived Cooper Barrett's Guide to Surviving Life.

In 2017, Brielle was cast as Sarika, "a career-driven student who's constantly trying to do everything right and climb the ladder" in the NBC comedy A.P. Bio, which premiered in 2018.

Brielle also stars as Lorna Reddy in Dead Girls Detective Agency, one of several new digital shows produced by NBCUniversal and Snap Inc. as part of their Snap Originals series. The first season began airing October 22, 2018, with a new episode available for viewing every day. Dead Girls Detective Agency was renewed for a third and fourth season and began airing new episodes on August 11, 2019.

In early 2019, Brielle joined Kevin Smith's View Askewniverse, playing Jihad in Jay and Silent Bob Reboot, which was released on October 15 of that same year. According to Smith, the "plucky Jihad" is part of a girl gang not unlike the characters played by Shannon Elizabeth, Ali Larter, Jennifer Schwalbach, and Eliza Dushku; however, the girls are not international jewel thieves, and their specific grouping was set up as a commentary on youth and diversity being a common focal-point in Hollywood's reboots and remakes.

In August 2021, Brielle joined the cast of Netflix's Boo, Bitch in the role of Riley, who is described as "a mean girl who disguises her meanness through calculated manipulation. Riley has made Erika’s life miserable ever since their freshman year." The mini-series aired on July 8, 2022.

Netflix announced that Brielle would join the cast of their Arnold Schwarzenegger-led spy series FUBAR in April 2022. Brielle plays Tina, "an NSA analyst on loan to the CIA. Despite her youth, she is very good at her job – extremely capable and intelligent, though a bit intimidated by her new colleagues."

== Filmography ==
=== Television ===
Year	Title	Role	Notes
2014	Grimm	Jenny	Episode: "My Fair Wesen"
2015	The Librarians	Flirty waitress	Episode: "And The Fables Of Doom"
2016	Cooper Barrett's Guide to Surviving Life	Attractive woman	Episode: "How to Survive Your Roommate's Girlfriend"
2018–2021	A.P. Bio	Sarika Sarkar	Main cast
2022	Boo, Bitch	Riley	Main cast
2023-2025	FUBAR	Tina	Main cast
2023	Mech Cadets	Ava Patel	Main cast; Voice role

=== Film ===
Year	Title	Role	Notes
2019	Jay and Silent Bob Reboot	Jihad	

=== Web ===
Year	Title	Role	Notes
2013	Infinite Issues	Lylyth	Main Cast
2017	Girly Tales	Driver #1	Episode: "People Yelling at People Yelling at People"
2018	Dead Girls Detective Agency	Lorna Reddy	Main Cast
