= Sierra Capri =

American actress (born 1998)

- Born: September 8, 1998 (age 28); Baltimore, Maryland, US
- Occupation: Actress
- Years active: 2016–present
- Known for: On My Block

Sierra Capri (born September 8, 1998) is an American actress. She is known for starring in the Netflix series On My Block as Monse Finnie.

== Early life ==
Capri was born and raised in Baltimore and moved to Georgia when she was 12. She was interested in acting from a young age. She promised her parents she would graduate from college before pursuing the career full-time.

== Career ==
She never studied acting. As a college student studying biology at college in Savannah, Georgia, she took jobs as an uncredited extra in the 2016 films Hidden Figures and Neighbors 2.

While working on Hidden Figures, she submitted audition tapes with the help of another actress on set, and auditioned for the Netflix original series On My Block. Capri told Terroir in 2018: "I was preparing myself for anything at that point, it didn’t really hit me until one of the casting directors emailed me and said, we like you, do you have time tomorrow to FaceTime one of the producers? And that turned out to be Lauren Iungerich, who is the creator of the show." After accepting the lead role of Monse Finnie, an Afro-Latina teenager, Capri left college to film the show. The show received critical acclaim, with the ensemble cast being praised for their performances. Capri is not Afro-Latina, but said in an interview with Remezcla that she can relate to Monse "in the sense that I’m multicultural and growing up I didn’t know that I wasn’t that accepted by either side."

In 2019, Capri starred as Kai in the indie film American Skin, which premiered at the Venice Film Festival in September 2019. It was received negatively by critics. In the same year, she was invited to be a part of a re-creation of the historic photograph "A Great Day in Harlem" by Art Kane, organized by the Strong Black Lead division of Netflix.

== Personal life ==
Capri enjoys biology and would like to pursue a career in forensics while continuing acting. She resides in Los Angeles.

== Filmography ==
=== Film ===
Year	Title	Role	Notes	Ref.
2016	Hidden Figures	Extra	Uncredited	
2016	Neighbors 2: Sorority Rising	Extra	Uncredited	
2019	American Skin	Kai		
2023	Young. Wild. Free.	Cassidy		
2026	The Social Reckoning	Deputy Diaz		

=== Television ===
Year	Title	Role	Notes	Ref.
2018–2021	On My Block	Monse Finnie	Main role; 38 episodes	
