= Julio Macias =

Mexican actor (born 1990)

- Born: Julio Arturo Macias; March 20, 1990 (age 36); Mexico City, Mexico
- Occupation: Actor
- Years active: 2016–present

Julio Arturo Macias (born March 20, 1990) is a Mexican actor. His breakthrough came with playing Oscar Diaz on the comedy drama series On My Block (2018–2021), for which he received two Imagen Award nominations. He also played Pete Astudillo in the biographical drama Selena: The Series (2020–2021).

== Early life ==
Macias was born in Mexico City, Mexico on March 20, 1990. As a child, his family moved to the United States.

== Filmography ==
=== Film ===
List of film roles
Year	Title	Role	Notes
2016	Por Sofia	Luis	Short film
2016	SinVerguenzas	Billetin	
2021	Unbound	Arias	Short film
2024	The Middle	Ricardo Baca	Short film
2024	Atypical Pirate	Hugo	
2024	Border Hunters	Andro	
2026	Holmes	Ramiro Rosales	Short film
TBA	Three Years Gone	David	Post-production

=== Television ===
List of television appearances and roles
Year	Title	Role	Notes
2016	Game Shakers	Canz	Episode: "Babe's Fake Disease"
2018	Jane the Virgin	Male student	Episode: "Chapter Seventy-Seven"
2018–2021	On My Block	Oscar "Spooky" Diaz	Recurring role (season 1–2); main role (season 3–4)
2019	S.W.A.T.	Hector Ledesma	Episode: "Fallen"
2020–2021	Selena: The Series	Pete Astudillo	Main role
2022	Promised Land	Javier	Recurring role; 6 episodes
2022	The Rookie	Damian Lopez	Episodes: "The Fugitive" and "The Naked and the Dead"
2022	Young Dario	Adult Dario (voice)	Main role
2024	Diarra from Detroit	Young Marshall	Episode: "Fishbones"
TBA	Poser	Mr. Cartwright	Filming

== Awards and nominations ==
List of awards and nominations received by Julio Macias
Award	Year (Note: Indicates the year of ceremony. Each year is linked to the article about the awards held that year, wherever possible.)	Category	Nominated work	Result	Ref.
Imagen Awards	2019	Best Supporting Actor – Television	On My Block	Nominated	
Imagen Awards	2020	Best Supporting Actor – Television	On My Block	Nominated	
