= The Nightlife =

- Starring: Nick Cannon; Aaron Fresh; Chloe Wang
- Country of origin: United States
- Original language: English
- No. of seasons: 1
- No. of episodes: 4

Production
- Executive producer: Nick Cannon
- Running time: 30 minutes
- Production company: Nickelodeon Productions

Original release
- Network: TeenNick
- Release: August 5 – August 26, 2010

The Nightlife is a dance-themed television series that originally aired on TeenNick. It was hosted by Nick Cannon, Aaron Fresh, and Chloe Wang (now professionally known as Chloe Bennet). The series premiered on August 5, 2010, and ran for four weekly episodes, the last of which aired on August 26, 2010.

Guests over the four episodes were Ice Cube, Anna Kendrick, Brandon Routh, Vita Chambers, T.I., Landon Liboiron, Travie McCoy, The School Grylz, Iyaz, & New Boyz.
