= Paula Garcés =

American actress (born 1974)

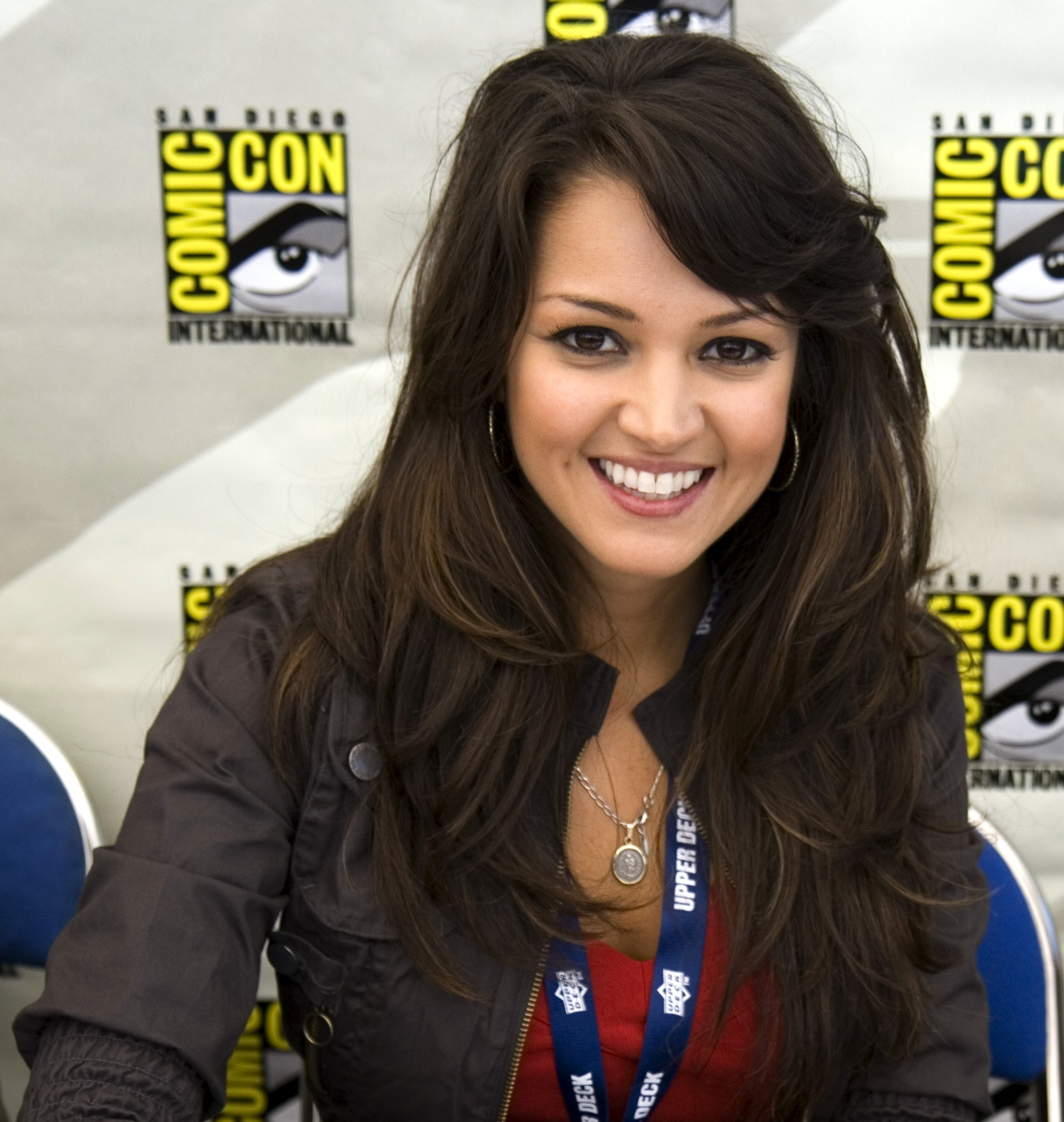
- Garcés in 2008
- Born: March 20, 1974 (age 52); Medellín, Colombia
- Citizenship: United States; Colombia
- Occupation: Actress
- Years active: 1991–present
- Spouse: Antonio Hernandez (m. 2002)
- Children: 2
- Website: paulagarces.com

Paula Garcés (born March 20, 1974) is an American actress and director. She has appeared in films such as Clockstoppers, Man of the House and the Harold & Kumar series, and on TV series such as CSI: Miami, On My Block, The Shield, Law & Order: Special Victims Unit, The Sopranos, Oz, Devious Maids, Guiding Light, and All My Children.

== Early life ==
Paula Garcés was born on March 20, 1974, in Medellín, Colombia. At a very early age she moved to East Harlem in New York City.

== Career ==
=== Acting ===
Garcés played Alvina in 1995's Dangerous Minds with Michelle Pfeiffer. Garcés has also co-starred on Guiding Light as Pilar Santos.

She co-starred in Paramount Pictures' 2002 teen sci-fi adventure Clockstoppers, starring opposite Jesse Bradford. She was then cast in Richard Benjamin's hip-hop comedy Marci X opposite Lisa Kudrow and Damon Wayans. Garcés was next seen opposite Academy Award-winner Tommy Lee Jones in the Revolution Studios feature Man of the House. In 2004, she starred in National Lampoon's Pledge This!. She was featured on CSI: Miami and starred in a four episode arc on NBC's Law and Order: Special Victims Unit, as well as guest spots on HBO's hit series The Sopranos and Oz.

Garcés landed a role as a cast member on The Shield. She appeared in New Line Cinema's 2004 feature film Harold & Kumar Go to White Castle, its 2008 sequel Harold & Kumar Escape from Guantanamo Bay and the 2011 sequel A Very Harold & Kumar 3D Christmas, as Maria, the love interest and later wife of John Cho's character.

Garcés was a series regular on the ABC drama series Defying Gravity, playing documentarian Paula Morales during its single 2009 season. She had a recurring role as Dr. Kelly Hernandez in the Syfy TV series Warehouse 13. She was also featured in the video "Imagínate" with Wisin & Yandel, and rapper T-Pain. In May 2011, Garcés appeared in "Off the Beaten Path", the 11th episode of season one of Breakout Kings. In February 2013, Garcés appeared on the CBS series Elementary, playing villainous police officer Paula Reyes in season one's episode "Details".

Garcés played Ruby's mom in On My Block, a Netflix series, and reprised the role in its spinoff Freeridge.

=== Comics ===
While attending a Comic-Con to promote one of the Harold & Kumar films, Garcés noted the sizeable Latino audience for superheroes, despite the low number of Latino characters in the genre. She created Further Lane Productions to issue a limited run comic book featuring the Latina superhero Aluna, later working with S2 Games to create, and voice, Aluna as a 2011 playable hero added to Heroes of Newerth, S2's multiplayer online battle arena video game. In time for the 2014 Comic-Con, she worked with sekretagent Productions and Allegory Media to produce a four issue Aluna comic book series. In 2019, Aluna was developed into an action RPG.

== Personal life ==
Garcés is a naturalized United States citizen. Her first child, a daughter, was born in 1992 when Garcés was eighteen years old. Garcés married entrepreneur and producer Antonio Hernandez in 2002. The couple have a son, born in 2013.

== Filmography ==
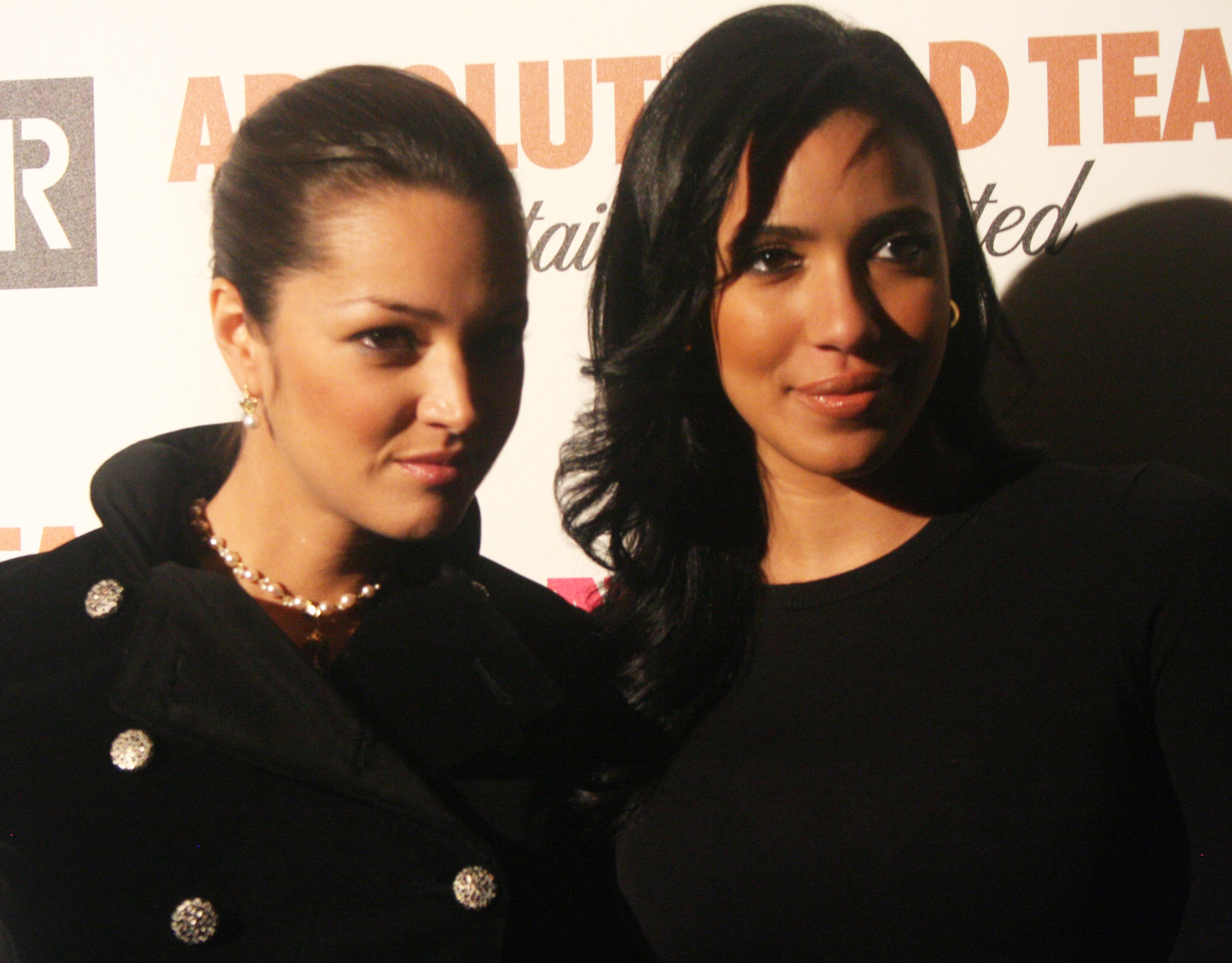
Garcés with Julissa Bermudez in March 2011

=== Film ===
Year	Title	Role	Notes
1991	Hangin' with the Homeboys	Harassed Sister	
1993	Life with Mikey	Janice	
1995	Dangerous Minds	Alvina	
1998	Harvest	Mina Fuentes	
2002	Clockstoppers	Francesca	
2003	The Station Agent	Cashier	
2003	Marci X	Yolanda Quinones	
2003	Spin	Francesca	
2004	Harold & Kumar Go to White Castle	Maria	
2005	Che Guevara	Aleida	
2005	The Shore	Tina	
2005	Man of the House	Teresa	
2006	National Lampoon's Pledge This!	Gloria Torrez	
2008	Harold & Kumar Escape from Guantanamo Bay	Maria	
2008	Harold & Kumar Go to Amsterdam	Maria	Short film
2011	A Very Harold & Kumar 3D Christmas	Maria	
2011	Deception	Katrina Mendoza	
2013	The Maid's Room	Drina	
2014	Adult Beginners	Blanca	
2021	Aftermath	Claudia	

=== Television ===
Year	Title	Role	Notes
1991	Law & Order	Lucy Rivers	Season 1 Episode 18: "The Secret Sharers"
1994	New York Undercover	Aria Nuriez	Season 1 Episode 1: "School Ties"
1999	Oz	Isabella	(1) Season 3 Episode 1: "The Truth and Nothing But..." (2) Season 3 Episode 2: "Napoleon's Boney Parts" (uncredited)
1999–2001	Guiding Light	Pilar Santos	Regular role (7 episodes)
2002	The Brothers García	Milagros	Season 3 Episode 4: "West Side Stories"
2003–2007	CSI: Miami	(1) Carmen Abregon (2) (3) Anna Sivarro	(1) Season 1 Episode 17: "Simple Man" (2003) (2) Season 5 Episode 17: "A Grizzly Murder" (2007) (3) Season 5 Episode 19: "Bloodline" (2007)
2004	The Sopranos	Felicia Galan	Season 5 Episode 9: "Unidentified Black Males"
2005	Law & Order: Special Victims Unit	CSU Tech Millie Vizcarrondo	(1) Season 7 Episode 5: "Strain" (2) Season 7 Episode 6: "Raw" (3) Season 7 Episode 7: "Name" (4) Season 7 Episode 11: "Alien"
2006–2008	The Shield	Officer Tina Hanlon	Recurring role (Seasons 5–6); Main role (Season 7) (28 episodes)
2008	Knight Rider	Kelli Haddigan	Season 1 Episode 1: "A Knight in Shining Armor"
2009	Defying Gravity	Paula Morales	Main role (13 episodes)
2010	Chase	Tia Archer	Season 1 Episode 11: "Betrayed"
2010–2014	Warehouse 13	Dr. Kelly Hernandez	(1) Season 2 Episode 3: "Beyond Our Control" (2010) (2) Season 2 Episode 7: "For the Team" (2010) (3) Season 2 Episode 8: "Merge with Caution" (2010) (4) Season 2 Episode 11: ""Buried" (2010) (5) Season 2 Episode 12: "Reset" (2010) (6) Season 5 Episode 4: "Savage Seduction" (2014)
2011	The Good Wife	Aida Rios	Season 2 Episode 20: "Foreign Affairs"
2011	Breakout Kings	Debbie Myera	Season 1 Episode 11: "Off the Beaten Path"
2013	Elementary	Paula Reyes	Season 1 Episode 16: "Details"
2013	All My Children	Lea Marquez	Recurring role (34 episodes)
2013	Devious Maids	Flora Hernandez	(1) Season 1 Episode 1: "Pilot" (2) Season 1 Episode 3: "Wiping Away the Past" (3) Season 1 Episode 5: "Taking Out the Trash" (4) Season 1 Episode 9: "Scrambling the Eggs" (5) Season 1 Episode 12: "Getting Out the Blood" (6) Season 1 Episode 13: "Totally Clean"
2016	King of LA	Valerie	TV movie / Unsold television pilot
2017	Major Crimes	Alexa Diaz	(1) Season 6 Episode 1: "Sanctuary City: Part 1" (2) Season 6 Episode 2: "Sanctuary City: Part 2" (3) Season 6 Episode 3: "Sanctuary City: Part 3" (4) Season 6 Episode 4: "Sanctuary City: Part 4" (5) Season 6 Episode 5: "Sanctuary City: Part 5"
2018–2021	On My Block	Geny Martinez	Recurring role (16 episodes)
2022	Chicago Med	Gia Lindahl	Season 7 Episode 14: "All the Things That Could Have Been"
2023	Freeridge	Geny Martinez	(1) Season 1 Episode 1: "The Box" (2) Season 1 Episode 2: "Cake" (3) Season 1 Episode 4: "Dead Mom" (4) Season 1 Episode 8: "Thanksgiving"
