= Peggy Blow =

Latina German-American actress

- Born: June 5, 1952 (age 74); Karlsruhe, Baden-Württemberg, West Germany
- Other name: Peggy Ann Blow
- Occupation: actress
- Years active: 1978–present
- Known for: On My Block

Peggy Blow is an American actress, best known for her role as Marisol Martinez, Ruby's grandmother on the Netflix series On My Block. Blow has made many appearances on television shows since the 1970s, and has been cast in several films.

== Career ==
Blow began her career in theater.

In 2018, Blow was cast as Ruby's grandmother in the Netflix series On My Block. She has stated that her character as Ruby's grandmother reminds her of her three aunts in Chicago.

== Filmography ==
Film
Year	Title	Role	Ref.
1978	Rabbit Test	Bunny	
1982	Penitentiary II	Ellen Johnson	
2009	Gary's Walk	Antonio	
2018	Twin Betrayal	Maria	
2019	Desperate Waters	Emilia	

Television
Year	Title	Role	Notes	Ref.
1983	Hill Street Blues	Justine Tatum	2 episodes	
1984-1985	E/R	Paula	2 episodes	
1985	The Jeffersons	Miss Anderson	1 Episode: "Sayonara: Part 2"	
1987	227	Melinda	1 Episode: "A Matter of Choice"	
1990	Drug Wars: The Camarena Story	Reporter	TV mini-series	
1990	Hardball		1 Episode: "A Death in the Family"	
1992	The Fresh Prince of Bel-Air	Marge Smallwood	1 Episode: "Those Were the Days"	
1993	Hangin' with Mr. Cooper	Broker	1 Episode: "In Vanessa We Trust"	
1994	The Nanny	Nanny #3	1 Episode: "The Nanny-In-Law"	
1997	Melrose Place	Nurse Kendra	1 Episode: "From Here to Maternity"	
1997	Alright Already	Nurse	1 Episode: "Again with the Baby"	
1997	Murphy Brown	Woman Shopper	1 Episode: A Butcher, a Faker, a Bummed-Out Promo Maker	
1997	Seinfeld	Mail Clerk	1 Episode: "The Junk Mail"	
1998	The Wayans Bros.	Crazy Mary	1 Episode: "Help a Brother Out"	
2000	City of Angels	Thelma Holmes	1 Episode: "Cry Me a Liver"	
2005	That's So Raven	Mrs. Caruthers	1 Episode: "Mr. Perfect"	
2006	In Justice	Judge Lynch	1 Episode: "Lovers"	
2008	Desperate Housewives	Fern Parrish	1 Episode: "The Gun Song"	
2009	Criminal Minds	Patricia	1 Episode: "Hopeless"	
2010	The New Adventures of Old Christine	Ticket Agent	1 Episode: "Up in the Airport"	
2012	Dexter	Florencia Estrada		
2013	Castle	Cedric Resident	1 Episode: "Watershed"	
2013	Crash & Bernstein	Mrs. Lopez	2 Episodes	
2016	How to Get Away with Murder	Croupier	1 Episode: "Always Bet Black"	
2017	Snowfall	Granny	1 Episode: "Trauma"	
2017	I'm Dying Up Here	Agnes	1 Episode: "The Unbelievable Power of Believing"	
2017	Real Rob	Amelia		
2016-2018	American Crime Story	Miriam / Rosa Lopez	3 Episodes	
2018	Andi Mack	Madame Le Doux	1 Episode: "Cyrus' Bash-Mitzvah"	
2019	Last Seen	Ida Heartstark		
2018–2021	On My Block	Ruby's Abuela (Marisol Martinez)	Recurring role (season 1-3); main role (season 4)	
2022	Raven's Home	Nurse Julie	1 Episode: "The Wrong Victor"	
2023	Freeridge	Mariluna	Main Role	
