= Ambush (2023 film) =

2023 war film

- Film poster
- Directed by: Mark Earl Burman
- Written by: Mark Earl Burman; Michael McClung; Johnny Lozano; Dillon Slack
- Produced by: Mark Earl Burman
- Starring: Jonathan Rhys Meyers; Connor Paolo; Aaron Eckhart
- Cinematography: Dan Frantz
- Edited by: Matthew Cassel
- Music by: We Are Dark Angels
- Production company: Dark Mark Productions
- Distributed by: Saban Films
- Release date: February 24, 2023
- Running time: 104 minutes
- Country: United States
- Language: English
- Box office: $26,305

Ambush is a 2023 American action war film produced and directed by Mark Earl Burman and written by Burman, Michael McClung, Johnny Lozano, and Dillon Slack. It stars Jonathan Rhys Meyers, Connor Paolo, and Aaron Eckhart.

== Plot ==
During the Vietnam War, a group of soldiers on a mission to gain intelligence materials, encounter enemy Vietcong (VC) forces in the extensive underground tunnel complexes that the VC have constructed below ground across South Vietnam during the conflict.

== Cast ==
- Jonathan Rhys Meyers as Lieutenant Colonel Miller
- Connor Paolo as Corporal Ackerman
- Jason Genao as Boyd
- Aaron Eckhart as General Drummond
- Gregory Sims as Captain Mora

== Release ==
The film was released in theaters, on demand, and on digital on February 24, 2023, by Saban Films.

== Reception ==
On the review aggregator website Rotten Tomatoes, 25% of 12 critics' reviews are positive, with an average rating of 4.9/10.

Todd Gilchrist of Variety gave the film a positive review, writing, "Nevertheless smarter and more entertaining than one might expect from a small-scale, outwardly familiar story like this, Ambush feels like a throwback — mostly in a good way — to the ‘Namsploitation films that companies like Cannon churned out in the 1980s, when stories about the war were at their most commercially popular."

Julian Roman of MovieWeb gave the film a negative review, writing, "The film vacillates between gritty combat, the brotherhood of soldiers, and a labored plot with critical issues. Pacing also becomes a factor during a prolonged and indiscernible subterranean second act."
