= The Estate (2022 film) =

2022 film by Dean Craig

- Theatrical release poster
- Directed by: Dean Craig
- Written by: Dean Craig
- Produced by: Marc Goldberg; Sarah Gabriel; Sarah Jessica Parker; Alison Benson
- Starring: Toni Collette; Anna Faris; David Duchovny; Rosemarie DeWitt; Ron Livingston; Kathleen Turner
- Cinematography: Darin Moran
- Edited by: Annette Davey
- Music by: Will Bates
- Production companies: Signature Films; Capstone Studios; Pretty Matches
- Distributed by: Signature Entertainment (United States, United Kingdom and Australia); Sky Cinema (United Kingdom)
- Release date: November 4, 2022
- Running time: 96 minutes
- Countries: United Kingdom; United States
- Language: English
- Budget: $10.5 million
- Box office: $572,062

The Estate is a 2022 black comedy film written and directed by Dean Craig. It stars Toni Collette and Anna Faris as sisters who try to get back in the good graces of their estranged aunt before she passes to inherit some of her fortune. The film was released on November 4, 2022, by Signature Entertainment.

== Plot ==
Two sisters, Macy and Savannah are denied for a bank loan. Their mom says her sister, with a $20 million estate, has cancer. Savannah suggests to her sister that they attempt to get their aunt Hilda's inheritance money. Macy's boyfriend is moving to Alaska for a year if there is no money, so she agrees to the plan.

But when they arrive at their aunt's mansion, they find their cousin Beatrice also there along with her husband James, making soup in kitchen. They accuse her of trying for the inheritance. Later, another cousin Richard alias Dick joins them. They trade insults between themselves. Richard hits on Macy, even though they are cousins.

Macy and Savannah take their aunt to see her sister for reconciliation, but they start physically fighting with each other. Richard buys flowers and cake for his aunt. James and Beatrice make the aunt a photo album - which she likes. Macy and Savannah are unable to compete against their cousins, so they plan to bring out the aunt's high school crush Bill. Beatrice overhears the plan and decides to get her aunt to sleep with her husband James, who rebels against it.

Macy and Savannah see Bill, but he lives in a Halfway House for sex offenders who are out of prison. They bribe him with $200, and give him the aunt's address.

Bill arrives for the date, and Dick remembers that Bill is a flasher and mentions it to Beatrice who breaks into the aunt's room and tells her about Bill being a sex offender. Aunt is willing to give Bill a second chance and get married, so Bill would inherit the estate, which spoils the cousins' plans.

The cousins all join together to take out Bill, deciding to split the estate equally between them. The plan is to show that Bill is still a flasher. Their younger sister is set as a bait for the sex offender Bill, and she agrees to get him drunk, and get him to flash.

James leaves, and wants his wife to come with him. He says it's either him or the money, and Beatrice chooses the money. The cousins lure Bill out to the garden and seat him with Ellen, but he passes out. Savannah unzips his pant and takes some pictures. Macy tries to zip him up, when her boyfriend Geoff arrives to see it happen. Hilda starts foaming at the mouth and a doctor is called who informs them it's time to say their goodbyes. The cousins give the aunt a will to sign with her giving up her estate to them. After forcing her to sign it, she rebukes them before taking her last breath.

At the will execution, the lawyer says the aunt had 17 million dollars, but only $38.17 remain after debts are accounted for. Plus Macy gets the painting of the aunt's dog.

When Macy and her sisters go home, they discover a document with the painting's value assessed at $4.3 million.

== Cast ==
- Toni Collette as Macey
- Anna Faris as Savannah
- David Duchovny as Richard
- Rosemarie DeWitt as Beatrice
- Kathleen Turner as Aunt Hilda
- Ron Livingston as James
- Keyla Monterroso Mejia as Ellen
- Danny Vinson as Bill

== Production ==
Signature and Capstone announced that Dean Craig was writing and directing The Estate in December 2021, and Toni Collette and Anna Faris would star in the film. In the following months, Kathleen Turner, Rosemarie DeWitt, Keyla Monterroso Mejia, David Duchovny, and Ron Livingston joined the cast.

Filming took place in New Orleans between February and March 2022.

== Release ==
Signature released the film to limited theaters on November 4, 2022. It released on DVD on January 10, 2023.

== Reception ==
=== Box office ===
The film grossed $572,062

=== Critical response ===
On the review aggregator website Rotten Tomatoes, 32% of 31 critics' reviews are positive, with an average rating of 4.3/10. The website's consensus reads: "With a coarse and leaden script persistently at odds against the film's stellar cast, most viewers will find The Estate taxing."
