= Freeridge =

2023 American comedy-drama series

- Genre: Teen; Comedy-drama
- Created by: Lauren Iungerich; Jamie Uyeshiro; Jamie Dooner; Eddie Gonzalez; Jeremy Haft
- Starring: Keyla Monterroso Mejia; Bryana Salaz; Tenzing Norgay Trainor; Ciara Riley Wilson; Peggy Blow
- Music by: KOVAS
- Country of origin: United States
- Original language: English
- No. of seasons: 1
- No. of episodes: 8

Production
- Executive producers: Lauren Iungerich; Eddie Gonzalez; Jeremy Haft; Jamie Dooner; Jamie Uyeshiro
- Producers: Eric Gutierrez; Will Rack; David Berke
- Cinematography: Eric Treml; Logan Schneider
- Editors: Adam Burr; Edwin Ulysses Rivera; Anthony M. Ocasio III
- Running time: 25–31 minutes
- Production company: Crazy Cat Lady Entertainment

Original release
- Network: Netflix
- Release: February 2, 2023

Related
- On My Block

Freeridge is an American teen comedy-drama television series created by Lauren Iungerich, Eddie Gonzalez, Jeremy Haft, Jamie Dooner, and Jamie Uyeshiro that premiered on Netflix on February 2, 2023. It is a spin-off of On My Block. In April 2023, the series was canceled after one season.

== Cast and characters ==
=== Main ===
- Keyla Monterroso Mejia as Gloria, the leader of the friend group
- Bryana Salaz as Ines, Gloria's younger sister
- Tenzing Norgay Trainor as Cameron, the only male in the friend group who is a proud bisexual. He has a boyfriend, but is still hung up on Demi whom he has a crush on since they were 12 years old.
- Ciara Riley Wilson as Demi, the friend who is interested in spirituality and Cameron's best friend
- Peggy Blow as Mariluna, a woman who is interested in getting the box the friend group have (supposedly Marisol's twin from On My Block)

=== Recurring ===
- Zaire Adams as Andre, Cameron's boyfriend
- Paula Garces as Geny, Gloria and Ines' neighbor. Garces reprises her role from On My Block.
- Eric Gutierrez as Ruben, Geny's husband. Gutierrez reprises his role from On My Block.
- JeanPaul SanPedro as Javier, Gloria and Ines' dad who is a widower
- J. R. Villarreal as Tonio, Gloria and Ines' uncle and Javier's brother
- Michael Solomon as Rusty, a new classmate of Gloria and Ines' whom Tonio hired as an assistant

== Episodes ==
No.	Title	Directed by	Written by	Original release date
1	"The Box"	Lauren Iungerich	Jamie Uyeshiro; Lauren Iungerich; Eddie Gonzalez; Jeremy Haft; Jamie Dooner	February 2, 2023
2	"Cake"	Lauren Iungerich	Lauren Iungerich	February 2, 2023
3	"Cinnamon"	Eli Gonda	Jamie Uyeshiro	February 2, 2023
4	"Dead Mom"	Arlyn Richardson	Veronica Rodriguez	February 2, 2023
5	"Edward Claw Hands"	Joe Suarez	Christy Stratton	February 2, 2023
6	"Revenge"	Paula Garces	Jamie Uyeshiro	February 2, 2023
7	"Karmic Coincidence"	Eli Gonda	Lauren Iungeric; Jamie Uyeshiro	February 2, 2023
8	"Thanksgiving"	Lauren Iungerich	Lauren Iungerich	February 2, 2023

== Production ==
On September 27, 2021, a spin-off of On My Block, titled as Freeridge was ordered to series by Netflix. It is created and executive produced by Lauren Iungerich, Eddie Gonzalez, Jeremy Haft, Jamie Dooner, and Jamie Uyeshiro. On October 8, 2021, Bryana Salaz, Keyla Monterroso Mejia, Ciara Riley Wilson, and Shiv Pai were cast to star. On November 4, 2022, Tenzing Norgay Trainor and Peggy Blow joined the cast in undisclosed capacities. The series was filmed from May 9 to July 5, 2022, in Los Angeles. On December 16, 2022, it was reported that Michael Solomon was cast to star and Trainor is part of the starring cast. The series was released on February 2, 2023. On April 12, 2023, it was reported that the series was canceled after one season.

== Reception ==
The review aggregator website Rotten Tomatoes reported an 80% approval rating with an average rating of 6.8/10, based on 10 critic reviews. Metacritic, which uses a weighted average, assigned a score of 77 out of 100 based on 4 critics, indicating "generally favorable reviews".
