= Young. Wild. Free. =

- Film poster
- Directed by: Thembi Banks
- Written by: Juel Taylor; Tony Rettenmaier
- Produced by: Charles D. King; James Lopez; Poppy Hanks; Tommy Oliver; Baron Davis; Tracy "Twinkie" Byrd
- Starring: Algee Smith; Sierra Capri; Sanaa Lathan
- Cinematography: Cary Lalonde; Dennis Zanatta
- Edited by: Lindsay Armstrong
- Release dates: January 22, 2023 (Sundance); June 27, 2024 (BET+)
- Running time: 113 minutes
- Country: United States
- Language: English

Young. Wild. Free. is a 2023 American drama film written by Juel Taylor and Tony Rettenmaier, directed by Thembi Banks and starring Algee Smith. It is Banks' feature directorial debut.

== Plot ==
Brandon, a high school senior in Compton, struggles to care for his younger siblings while dealing with poverty and family problems. His life takes a dangerous turn after he encounters Cassidy, a mysterious girl who robs him at gunpoint but also becomes the center of his attention. As their relationship deepens, Brandon is forced to make difficult choices that could change his future.

== Cast ==
- Algee Smith as Brandon Huffman
- Sanaa Lathan as Janice Huffman
- Sierra Capri as Cassidy
- Mike Epps as Lamont

== Production ==
According to Banks, the first day of filming occurred on March 11, 2020 and then filming was halted due to the COVID-19 pandemic. In August 2022, it was reported that production on the film was underway in Los Angeles.

== Release ==
The film premiered at the Sundance Film Festival in the Library Center Theater on January 22, 2023.

This BET+ original produced by MACRO premieres on BET+ June 27.

== Reception ==
The film has a 71% rating on Rotten Tomatoes based on 17 reviews. Tomris Laffly of Variety gave the film a negative review and wrote, "An Uncertain Script Saddles a Stylish Coming-of-Age Movie Full of Los Angeles Love." Esther Zuckerman of IndieWire graded the film a C− and wrote, "Trust me, you’ve heard this one before." Patrice Witherspoon of Screen Rant awarded the film four stars out of five.
