= Abominable (2019 film) =

Film by Jill Culton

- Theatrical release poster
- Directed by: Jill Culton
- Written by: Jill Culton
- Produced by: Suzanne Buirgy; Peilin Chou
- Starring: Chloe Bennet; Albert Tsai; Tenzing Norgay Trainor; Eddie Izzard; Sarah Paulson; Tsai Chin
- Edited by: Pamela Ziegenhagen-Shefland
- Music by: Rupert Gregson-Williams
- Production companies: DreamWorks Animation; Pearl Studio; Zhong Ming You Ying Film
- Distributed by: Universal Pictures (Worldwide); Pearl Studio (China)
- Release dates: September 7, 2019 (TIFF); September 27, 2019 (United States)
- Running time: 97 minutes
- Countries: China; United States
- Language: English
- Budget: $75 million
- Box office: $190.3 million

Abominable is a 2019 animated fantasy adventure film written and directed by Jill Culton. A co-production between China and the United States led by DreamWorks Animation and Pearl Studio, the film stars the voices of Chloe Bennet, Albert Tsai, Tenzing Norgay Trainor, Eddie Izzard, Sarah Paulson, and Tsai Chin. It follows a teenage girl named Yi (Bennet) who encounters Everest, a young Yeti, on the roof of her apartment building in Shanghai, and travels to Mount Everest to reunite him with his family

The film was announced in 2010 as its original title Everest. By 2016, Culton passed on the project after being replaced by Todd Wilderman and Tim Johnson, but eventually rejoined in February 2018, replacing Johnson, who remained with the project as an executive producer. Wilderman remained as co-director. DreamWorks announced in December 2016 that the film would be released in September 2019, with Pearl Studio and Zhong Ming You Ying Film co-producing the film. The cast were announced between March and June 2018. In May 2018, DreamWorks changed the title to Abominable. The music in the film was scored by Rupert Gregson-Williams.

Abominable premiered at the Toronto International Film Festival on September 7, 2019, and was released by Universal Pictures in the United States on September 27 while Pearl Studio distributed the film in China. The film received generally positive reviews from critics for its animation and grossed over $190 million worldwide on a production budget of $75 million.

In Southeast Asia, Abominable has garnered controversy for a scene involving a map of the region with the nine-dash line, a contested demarcation line used by China to lay claim over a portion of the South China Sea. Due to this, the film has been banned in several countries involved in territorial disputes with China over the South China Sea—namely, the Philippines, Vietnam, and Malaysia.

A follow-up television series, Abominable and the Invisible City, was released on streaming service Peacock and Hulu from October 2022 to March 2023.

== Plot ==
A young Yeti escapes from a compound in Shanghai owned by wealthy businessman Mr. Burnish, who intends to use him to prove the existence of yetis to the world. Meanwhile, teenager Yi lives with her mother and Nai Nai (grandmother) in an apartment building. She leads a busy life, and neglects to spend time with her family and her friends, basketball fan Peng and his tech-savvy and popular older cousin Jin, who is on bad terms with Yi. Yi is a violinist, but has not played in front of others since her father's death, as he was a violinist (which is the primary reason for her self-isolation). Instead, she goes to the rooftop of her home and plays a song her father taught her each night.

One evening, Yi encounters the Yeti near her cubby house on the roof of her apartment building, and names him "Everest". While hiding him from Burnish Industries's helicopters, Yi gains his trust by feeding him baozi and treating his wounds. Yi learns that Everest wants to reunite with his family on Mount Everest, while Everest learns about Yi's desire to travel across China - something her father had always wanted. When Burnish Industries's private security forces close in on Everest's hiding place, Everest flees with Yi. Peng and Jin follow behind the duo. After narrowly escaping a Burnish helicopter at the Oriental Pearl Tower, Yi and Everest flee on a ship carrying red cola cans, followed by Peng and a reluctant Jin.

Yi, Everest, and the boys reach a port in southern China and travel on a truck. After their crate falls off the truck, they end up in a forest. There, Everest awes the humans with his mystical powers of stimulating growth among blueberry plants. Meanwhile, Mr. Burnish and zoologist Dr. Zara continue the hunt for Everest. Following Everest and his human friends' trail, they catch up with them in the Sichuan region, where Everest uses his power to cause a dandelion to grow to a gigantic size. While Yi, Everest, and Peng manage to escape on the wind-blown seed head, Jin is left behind and captured by Burnish Industries's Goon Leader.

Despite Zara's pretense of caring for animals, Jin learns that she is planning to hunt down Everest to sell him, as well as kill Yi, Jin and Peng, and that the Goon Leader is working alongside her. He also learns that the seemingly cold-hearted Burnish has a soft spot for animals, including Zara's pet albino jerboa Duchess. He manages to escape the camp, and pursues the others on foot. Meanwhile, Yi, Everest, and Peng reach the Gobi Desert, where they befriend several tortoises, who gratefully accept the giant dandelion. Later, they travel to a town on the banks of the Yellow River, where Burnish Industries corners them. Peng helps them escape by unleashing a yak stampede. With the help of Jin, they escape across the Yellow River to a field of yellow flowers, which Everest causes to move like waves, creating more distance from their pursuers. In the process, Yi's violin in broken, but Everest mends it using his own hair, giving the violin his powers.

Continuing their journey, which Yi realizes echoes her father's dream trip exactly, the humans and Everest eventually reach the Himalayas. While crossing a bridge, they are trapped on both sides by Burnish Industries's forces. However, Burnish experiences a change of heart after seeing Everest protecting the children, causing him to experience a flashback to his first encounter with a female yeti, which was protecting her young. Still seeking to sell Everest, Zara betrays Burnish by injecting him with a tranquilizer dart before doing the same to Everest as well. Yi tries to protect Everest, but gets hurled over the bridge by Zara, who then departs the mountain with the captive Everest, Peng, and Jin in tow.

However, Yi manages to cling on to a rope and uses her violin to reinvigorate Everest, who breaks free of his cage. Losing what is left of her sanity, Zara attempts to kill Everest and sell his parts instead. The avalanche she causes knocks her and her Goon Leader off the cliffside to their deaths. To protect Everest and the yetis, Burnish agrees to help Yi, Peng, and Jin keep his existence a secret. Yi, Peng, Jin, and Everest continue the journey to Mount Everest, where they reunite Everest with his family before departing. Returning home to Shanghai with the help of Burnish, Yi spends more time with her mother, grandmother, Peng, and Jin.

== Voice cast ==
- Chloe Bennet as Yi, a violin-playing teenager.
- Albert Tsai as Peng, a friend of Yi's and Jin's cousin.
- Tenzing Norgay Trainor as Jin, a millennial friend of Yi's and Peng's cousin.
- Eddie Izzard as Burnish, a wealthy man and head of Burnish Industries who wants to catch a Yeti.
- Sarah Paulson as Dr. Zara, a poacher under the disguise of a zoologist who works with Burnish.
- Tsai Chin as Nai Nai
- Joseph Izzo as Everest, a Yeti that Yi befriends.
  - Rupert Gregson-Williams as Everest's humming voice
- Michelle Wong as Mei, Yi's mother
- Rich Dietl as Goon Leader, the leader of the goons that work for Burnish Industries. Burnish often referred to him as a "Captain".
- James Hong as a Yak Herder living on the banks of the Yellow River whose yak herd Everest blends in with.
- Christine Lin as Teenage Girl #1, Boy's Mother, Female Customer
- Kym Miller as Teenage Girl #2
- Jason Ko as Teenage Boy
- Trevor Devall as Van Driver
- Karen Huie as Dog Lady, Doc Worker
- Vic Chao as Jin Impersonator, a man in a village on the banks of the Yellow River who Yi thought was Jin.
- Fernando Chien as Merchant

== Production ==
Abominable was in development at DreamWorks Animation since 2010. For some time, Jill Culton was writing and directing the film, originally titled Everest, which was about a little girl and a Yeti, but by 2016, she had left the project. She was then replaced by Tim Johnson and Todd Wilderman.

In December 2016, DreamWorks announced that the film would be released on September 27, 2019, and that it would be co-produced by Oriental DreamWorks (now Pearl Studio), marking their second collaboration after Kung Fu Panda 3 (2016). On February 2, 2018, it was announced that Culton had returned as the writer and director for the film, replacing Johnson who became an executive producer with Frank Zhu and Li Ruigang. On March 20, 2018, it was announced that Chloe Bennet has been cast in the lead role as Yi. On May 18, 2018, DreamWorks and Pearl Studio announced that the film has been retitled from Everest to Abominable, and Albert Tsai, Tenzing Norgay Trainor, and Tsai Chin were cast the following month.

Overall, the budget was approximately $75 million.

== Music ==
The film's music was composed by Rupert Gregson-Williams, making it his third collaboration with the studio, after Over the Hedge (2006) and Bee Movie (2007). Also featured on the soundtrack is an original song titled "Beautiful Life" sung by American musician, Bebe Rexha. The film also featured a version of Coldplay's Fix You. The soundtrack was released digitally on September 13, 2019, by Back Lot Music.

== Release ==
Abominable had its world premiere at the Toronto International Film Festival on September 7, 2019. The film was released on September 27, 2019, in the United States and on October 11 in the United Kingdom by Universal Pictures. Universal also handles worldwide distribution alongside various regional partners except for China, where the film was solely distributed by co-producer Pearl Studio, who (under their former name of Oriental DreamWorks) had distributed all of DreamWorks Animation's films in the country since the partnership began.

=== Nine-dash line controversy ===
A screenshot from the film, depicting a map with the nine dash line visible.

The film was banned in Vietnam on October 14, 2019, ten days after its release, due to the appearance of the nine-dash line in a scene. The Philippines (but Visayas & Mindanao are not included) and Malaysia also reacted negatively to this scene. Filipino lawyer Jay Batongbacal requested that the film be banned, while the Philippines' Secretary of Foreign Affairs Teodoro Locsin Jr. thought it was better to cut the scene in question. On October 17, Malaysia ordered the scene be cut from the film through its film censorship board. However, after Universal refused to make the censor cut, the film was banned entirely in Malaysia. The following day, the Philippines' Movie and Television Review and Classification Board followed suit, also banning the film.

=== Home media ===
Abominable was released on digital and Movies Anywhere by Universal Pictures Home Entertainment on December 3, 2019, with Blu-ray, 4K Ultra HD and DVD releases following on December 17. All releases included two short films like Show and Tell, a short focusing on Everest showing the Yetis of the human life, animated by Company 3 Animation, and Marooned, which had previously been screened at the 2019 Annecy International Animated Film Festival and as part of a cross-promotion between DreamWorks Animation and AMC Theatres. The 4K Ultra HD version additionally uses HDR10+, making it Universal's second animated film to use the format after The Secret Life of Pets 2 and their sixth film overall.

== Reception ==
=== Box office ===
Abominable has grossed $61.3 million in the United States and Canada, and $129 million in other territories, for a worldwide total of $190.3 million, against a production budget of $75 million.

In the United States and Canada, the film was projected to gross $17–20 million from 4,200 theaters in its opening weekend. The film made $5.7 million on its first day, including $650,000 from Thursday night previews. It went on to debut to $20.9 million, finishing first at the box office and marking the best opening for an original animated film of 2019. The film made $12 million in its second weekend, finishing second behind newcomer Joker.

=== Critical response ===
Rotten Tomatoes reported that 83% of critics have given the film a positive review based on 170 reviews, with an average rating of 6.8/10. The website's critics consensus reads, "Working with admittedly familiar ingredients, Abominable offers audiences a beautifully animated and overall engaging adventure that the whole family can enjoy." On Metacritic, the film has a weighted average score of 61 out of 100 based on 28 critics, indicating "generally favorable" reviews. Audiences polled by CinemaScore gave the film an average grade of "A" on an A+ to F scale, while those at PostTrak gave it an average 4 out of 5 stars.

Brian Tallerico of RogerEbert.com gave Abominable two out of four stars, opining that it "lack[ed] the personality to distinguish it from superior animated films that cover most of the same ground." Similarly, Peter Travers of Rolling Stone gave the film 2.5 out of five stars, likening it to fellow DreamWorks film How to Train Your Dragon (2010). While praising Yi's violin music and the animated scenes featuring whooping snakes and Everest's visual wonders, he thought that Abominable failed to distinguish itself in a crowded market. Glenn Kenny of The New York Times praised the film for its "exceptionally watchable and amiable" story and animated visual effects.

Clarissa Loughrey of The Independent gave Abominable three out of five stars, describing the film as "occasionally original, but not quite daring enough." She also praised the director Jill Culton for writing Yi as a grounded and authentic female protagonist while avoiding forcing her to prove herself and shoe-horned romances. Nick De Semiyen of Empire magazine awarded Abominable three out of five stars. He praised the film for its female director Culton, female lead character Yi, and for embracing its Chinese milieu including Yi's grandma Nai Nai. However, he observed that the film brought nothing new to the animation medium but praised it for incorporating a reference to Indiana Jones and the Last Crusade.

Peter Bradshaw of The Guardian gave Abominable two out of five stars, regarding the yeti as a bland character and observing the film's similarities to How to Train Your Dragon and E.T. the Extra-Terrestrial. By contrast, Simran Hans of The Observer gave the film a more favorable review, awarding it three out of five stars. She praised the film for its animation effects of the yeti's magical powers and also likened the film to How to Train Your Dragon.

=== Accolades ===
Award	Date of ceremony	Category	Recipients	Result	Ref.
Annie Awards	January 25, 2020	Outstanding Achievement for Animated Effects in an Animated Production	Amaury Aubel, James Jackson, Domin Lee, Michael Losure, and Alex Timchenko	Nominated	
Annie Awards	January 25, 2020	Outstanding Achievement for Character Design in an Animated Feature Production	Nico Marlet	Nominated	
Annie Awards	January 25, 2020	Outstanding Achievement for Production Design in an Animated Feature Production	Max Boas, Paul Duncan, Christopher Brock, Cecline Da Hyeu Kim, and Jane Li	Nominated	
Annie Awards	January 25, 2020	Outstanding Achievement for Voice Acting in an Animated Feature Production	Tenzing Norgay Trainor	Nominated	
Casting Society of America	January 30, 2020	Animation	Christi Soper Hilt	Nominated	
Critics' Choice Movie Awards	January 12, 2020	Best Animated Feature	Abominable	Nominated	
Producers Guild of America Awards	January 18, 2020	Outstanding Producer of Animated Theatrical Motion Pictures	Abominable	Nominated	
Visual Effects Society Awards	January 29, 2020	Outstanding Effects Simulations in an Animated Feature	Alex Timchenko, Domin Lee, Michael Losure and Eric Warren	Nominated	
Art Directors Guild Awards	February 1, 2020	Animated Film	Max Boas	Nominated	
Saturn Awards	October 26, 2021	Best Animated Film	Abominable	Nominated	

== Television series ==
=== Abominable and the Invisible City (2022–2023) ===
On February 11, 2022, it was announced that Peacock had ordered a CG animated series from DreamWorks Animation Television serving as a follow up to the film, titled Abominable and the Invisible City. The series chronicles Yi, Jin and Peng learning more about Everest and the magical creatures of the world. Spirit Riding Free workers Jim Schumann and Katherine Nolfi executive produce the series, Tiffany Lo and Ethel Lung serve as story editors, Bennet and Trainor reprised their roles of Yi and Jin from the film with Alan Cumming replacing Izzard as Burnish. The series was released on October 5, 2022, with 10 episodes on Peacock and Hulu. Season 2 premiered on March 29, 2023.
