= Tenzing Norgay Trainor =

American actor (born 2001)

- Born: September 4, 2001 (age 24); Los Angeles, California, U.S.
- Other name: Tenzing Trainor
- Occupation: Actor
- Years active: 2012–present
- Television: Liv and Maddie; Good Luck Charlie; Abominable
- Relatives: Tenzing Norgay (maternal grandfather); Jamling Tenzing Norgay (uncle); Tashi Tenzing (cousin); Nawang Gombu (first cousin once removed)
- Musical career
- Labels: Walt Disney, Columbia

Tenzing Norgay Trainor (born September 4, 2001) is an American actor. He gained notability for his role as Parker Rooney on the Disney Channel television show Liv and Maddie (2013–2017) and the voice of Jin in the animated adventure film Abominable (2019) and its follow-up Abominable and the Invisible City (2022–2023). He also appeared in TV shows including Good Luck Charlie, The Jadagrace Show, and Stevie TV.

== Early life and career ==
Tenzing Norgay Trainor was born on September 4, 2001, in Los Angeles, California, to Clark Tulley Trainor and Deki Tenzing Norgay. He is of Nepalese and Tibetan descent on his mother's side. His maternal grandfather is Nepalese Sherpa mountaineer Tenzing Norgay, who, together with Edmund Hillary, was the first to climb Mount Everest. He has two younger brothers, Kalden and Yonden, and played football since the age of six.

He grew up in Florida where he, at the age of eight, started acting at Paladin Playhouse Theater in Fort Lauderdale theater camp. His father forced him into the theater camp so that he could learn how to speak in front of people. After returning to California, he started his acting career with appearances in TV series like Stevie TV. His breakthrough came in 2013 in the series Liv and Maddie where he played the recurring role of Parker Rooney, Liv and Maddie's younger brother. In 2014, he made a guest appearance as Parker Rooney in the Jessie crossover episode "Jessie's Aloha Holidays with Parker and Joey", along with Joey Bragg as Joey Rooney. In 2017, Liv and Maddie ended after four years.

In 2018, Trainor was cast as Jimbo in two episodes of the Nickelodeon series Knight Squad. In 2019, he starred in the short comedy film Clueless, for which he won an Independent Shorts Award as Best Child/Young Actor. In the animated feature film Abominable, he voiced the character of Jin who, similar to Tenzing Norgay, climbs Mount Everest to bring back a Yeti to his family. He reprised his role in the animated series Abominable and the Invisible City. In 2022, he appeared as Gavin, a member of "The Afterlifers", in the Netflix series Boo, Bitch with Lana Condor and Zoe Colletti. In 2023, he starred in the single eight-episode series of Freeridge.

== Filmography ==
Film
Year	Title	Role	Notes
2013	The Lost Medallion: The Adventures of Billy Stone	Child #2	
2013	Super Buddies	Buddha	Voice role
2019	Clueless	Liam	
2019	Abominable	Jin	Voice role
2022	Night at the Museum: Kahmunrah Rises Again	Bodhi	Voice role

Television
Year	Title	Role	Notes
2012	Stevie TV	Gosselin Boy	Episode #1.4
2012	The Jadagrace Show	Jackie Swartz	
2012	Bits and Pieces	Brody	
2013	Good Luck Charlie	Devan	Episode "Rock Enroll"
2013–2017	Liv and Maddie	Parker Rooney	Main role
2014	Jessie	Parker Rooney	Episode "Jessie's Aloha Holidays with Parker and Joey"
2017	The Mick	Jaxon	Episode "The Teacher"
2018	Knight Squad	Jimbo	2 episodes
2019	Modern Family	David Tashi	Episode "A Game of Chicken"
2019	The Stranded	Gun	Voice role
2020–2021	American Housewife	Trevor	6 episodes
2022	Boo, Bitch	Gavin	Main role
2022–2023	Abominable and the Invisible City	Jin	Voice role
2023	Freeridge	Cameron	Main role

== Awards and nominations ==
Award	Year	Nominated work	Category	Result	Ref.
Independent Shorts Bronze Awards	2019	Clueless	Best Child/Young Actor	Won	
Annie Awards	2020	Abominable	Outstanding Achievement for Voice Acting in a Feature Production	Nominated	
