= TYT Türk =

- Country: Turkey
- Broadcast area: Turkey
- Headquarters: Istanbul

Programming
- Language(s): Turkish

Ownership
- Owner: Arzu Erdem

History
- Launched: 1 August 2019 (test); 5 August 2019 (normal); 1 March 2025 (again)
- Closed: 27 November 2019 (satellite); 24 March 2020 (online)

Links
- Website: tytturk.com

Availability

Streaming media
- TYT Türk Live: Live TYT Türk

TYT Türk was a short-lived television channel broadcast in Texs Medya. The channel included news, sport, entertainment, movies, and television series. The channel broadcast in 4K format. TYT Türk broadcasting ceased on 24 March 2020. It resumed broadcasting on March 1, 2025, with former MHP MP Arzu Erdem as the Chairman of the Board of Directors. Although the channel's opening date was previously announced as March 7 on its website, it was brought forward 1 week in order to experience the spirituality of Ramadan due to March 1 falling on the first day of Ramadan. The first program broadcast by the channel during this period was the program called Huzur Sohbetleri Sahur, featuring Hafız Dr. Selman Okumuş. The date on which all programs on the channel will be broadcast was determined as March 7, 2025.

== History ==
TYT Türk was planned in 2017. TYT Türk started broadcasting was expected for 18 November 2018. However, broadcasting was not yet started. On 1 August 2019, TYT Türk began test broadcasting. On 5 August 2019, the channel's satellite broadcasting officially started. When TYT Türk reached its advertising level, D-Smart, Digitürk, Türksat Kablo TV, Turkcell TV+, Vodafone TV, Tivibu, and IPTV would come on the new HD broadcast platform. However, TYT Türk's advertising level did not reach and the aforementioned brands did not come.

On 27 November 2019, TYT Türk discontinued its television broadcasting due to an economical crisis. TYT Türk was discontinued in Türksat satellite due to advertisement level being left unreached. After the channel's closure, it was announced that the sales option of TYT Türk was also evaluated. It was stated that the channel sold more than 5.5 million TL with the frequency right and technical material. While it is not known whether there was a buyer on the channel, it would be clear whether the sale would be in the future and whether the channel could be closed completely. While wondering what would be the situation of 80 employees working on the channel, it was announced that the channel would reach the audience for a while, but would not produce any new productions and would not broadcast live. TYT Türk would later lay off 80 employees.

As of 24 March 2020, TYT Türk ended TV live streaming with internet.
