= Boo, Bitch =

2022 American comedy miniseries

- Netflix poster
- Genre: Comedy
- Created by: Tim Schauer & Kuba Soltysiak and Erin Ehrlich & Lauren Iungerich
- Starring: Lana Condor; Zoe Colletti; Mason Versaw; Aparna Brielle; Tenzing Norgay Trainor
- Music by: Kovas
- Country of origin: United States
- Original language: English
- No. of episodes: 8

Production
- Executive producers: Lauren Iungerich; Erin Ehrlich; Jamie Dooner; Jonathon Komack Martin; Blake Goza; Lana Condor
- Producers: Arlyn Richardson; Nellie Rachel Nugiel
- Cinematography: Eric Treml
- Editors: Steve Edwards; Edwin Ulysses Rivera; Anthony M. Ocasio III
- Running time: 21–27 minutes
- Production companies: Crazy Cat Lady Productions; Angry Bee Juice; The Komack Company

Original release
- Network: Netflix
- Release: July 8, 2022

Boo, Bitch is an American supernatural comedy television miniseries created by Tim Schauer, Kuba Soltysiak, Erin Ehrlich and Lauren Iungerich that premiered on Netflix on July 8, 2022. The series stars Lana Condor, Zoe Colletti, Mason Versaw, Aparna Brielle, and Tenzing Norgay Trainor.

== Cast and characters ==
=== Main ===
- Lana Condor as Erika Vu
- Zoe Colletti as Gia, Erika's best friend since childhood
- Mason Versaw as Jake C., Erika's crush
- Aparna Brielle as Riley, a popular girl who is Jake C.'s on-and-off girlfriend and Erika's frenemy
- Tenzing Norgay Trainor as Gavin, Gia's love interest, and leader of The Afterlifers

=== Recurring ===
- Jami Alix as Lea, Riley’s friend
- Nick Benson as Chase
- Brittany Bardwell as Sophia
- John Brantley Cole as Dr. Vu, Erika's father
- Van Brunelle as Oliver Vu, Erika's younger brother
- Austin Fryberger as Archer
- Conor Husting as Jake W., Jake C.'s best friend
- Alyssa Jirrels as Alyssa, a teen mom
- Michael Solomon as Jake M., Jake C.'s best friend
- Cathy Vu as Mrs. Vu, Erika's mother
- Savira Windyani as Sail, a member of the Afterlifers
- Abigail Achiri as Raven, a member of The Afterlifers
- Reid Miller as Brad, a member of The Afterlifers
- Jason Genao as Devon, a childhood enemy of Erika

=== Guest starring ===
- Madison Thompson as Emma, head of the prom committee

== Episodes ==
No.	Title	Directed by	Written by	Original release date
1	"Life's a Bitch, Then You Die"	Lauren Iungerich	Erin Ehrlich & Lauren Iungerich	July 8, 2022
Unpopular seniors Erika Vu and Gia strive to make a name for themselves before graduation by attending a party. Jake C. breaks up with his on-and-off girlfriend Riley. Erika and Gia get closer to their crushes Jake C. and Jake W., respectively, and consider asking them out to prom. Waking up hungover, they last remember walking home from the party and seeing a car speed toward them. They return to where they walked and are shocked to see a corpse covered by a moose. On the corpse's feet are Erika's shoes.
2	"Resting Bitch Face"	Lauren Iungerich	Lauren Iungerich	July 8, 2022
Erika concludes that she is a ghost, and regrets not living her life to the fullest before. She discovers she is able to tamper with electronic devices. She meets with the Afterlifers, a group of teens interested in the paranormal, who suggest that ghosts exist when they have unfinished business. She realizes her unfinished business is to kiss Jake C., so she rushes to a hangout he invited her hours ago, only to find that, as she is so late and that Jake C. has rebounded to Riley again.
3	"Payback's a Bitch"	Erin Ehrlich	Erin Ehrlich	July 8, 2022
The Afterlifers explain to Erika that if a ghost does not complete their unfinished business before their corpse decomposes, the ghost will fade away and be forced to haunt for eternity. Worried, Erika apologizes to Jake C. for not making it to his hangout, and he invites her to a friend's promposal. Before she plans to kiss Jake C. and ascend, she says goodbye to her family and Gia. She befriends Riley, who asks Erika not to date Jake C. Erika kisses him, but is confused when she does not ascend.
4	"Bitch Slapped"	Erin Ehrlich	Tim Schauer & Kuba Soltysiak	July 8, 2022
Erika thinks that her unfinished business is actually going to prom with Jake C. They host a party so they can ask both their crushes to prom. Gia is saddened to see Erika take the credit for their party, Jake W. date someone else, and that no one seems to notice her. She meets Gavin, the medium from the Afterlifers, and kisses him. Jake C. agrees to go to prom with Erika. Riley angrily confronts her for arranging to go with her ex-boyfriend to prom, but Erika defends herself and asks her to leave the party. As the crowd celebrates Erika, Gia sulks behind.
5	"Fake Bitch"	Kimberly McCullough	Vivian Huang & Jewel Chanel	July 8, 2022
Erika skyrockets in popularity after her party and confrontation with Riley. Her relationships with Gia and Jake C. are strained when she focuses on her popularity over them. When she obsesses over an anonymous troll comment, Riley offers to help her manage her new stardom. Erika lies to Gia so she can hang out with Riley. It is revealed that Gia left the hate comment.
6	"Who Dat Bitch?"	Kimberly McCullough	Sonia Kharkar	July 8, 2022
Erika starts hanging out more with Riley rather than Gia. Gia begs Erika to spend more time with her before she ascends by the prom, but she instead worries that she does not have enough time to enjoy her new stardom. The Afterlifers explain that a ghost can stay in their ghost body if they are more famous in death than in life. Erika goads her classmates into cancelling prom in a popularity stunt. Gia and Jake C. accuse her of not caring about anyone else. Erika and Gia fight in the forest near the corpse, where they are surprised to find that the body is actually Gia's.
7	"Bad Bitch"	Kimberly McCullough	Stefanie Leder	July 8, 2022
A flashback shows that Gia was the one who got hit by the moose, and that ghost Gia replaced her corpse's shoes with Erika's. She explains that she did not want Erika to feel guilty for her death, but Erika accuses her of being selfish. Gia tells her that she is slowly fading away, so wishes to reconcile with her. She is incredulous when Erika instead asks her to help delete some blackmail on Erika. Everyone at school starts hating Erika for cancelling prom and Jake C. breaks up with her. Gia breaks up with Gavin to spare his feelings for when she disappears. He talks to his friends about her, but they do not recall ever seeing Gia since the party.
8	"Bitch, Bye"	Kim Nguyen	Erin Ehrlich	July 8, 2022
Erika realizes that Gia was invisible to everyone except her and Gavin since she was a ghost. Asking for a sign of what to do, she receives a message telling her to go to prom. Gia shows up, says goodbye to Erika and dances with Gavin. Erika gives a speech honoring Gia's memory, and as all the students chant Gia's name, she ascends. Erika reconciles with Jake C. and her classmates at the after party. In college, Erika sees a sign that Gia is still with her and smiles.

== Production ==
=== Development ===
On February 5, 2021, Netflix gave production a limited series order consisting of eight episodes. The series is created by Tim Schauer, Kuba Soltysiak, Erin Ehrlich, Lauren Iungerich. Ehrlich and Iungerich are also expected to executive produce alongside Lana Condor, Jonathon Komack Martin, Blake Goza, and Jamie Dooner. The series premiered on July 8, 2022.

=== Casting ===
Upon the limited series order announcement, Condor was also cast to star. On August 27, 2021, Zoe Colletti, Mason Versaw, and Aparna Brielle joined the cast as series regulars while Tenzing Norgay Trainor and Jason Genao were cast in recurring capacities. On June 13, 2022, it was reported that Jami Alix, Madison Thompson, and Reid Miller joined the cast in undisclosed capacities.

== Reception ==
The review aggregator website Rotten Tomatoes reported a 50% approval rating with an average rating of 5.6/10, based on 18 critic reviews. Metacritic, which uses a weighted average, assigned a score of 49 out of 100 based on 8 critics, indicating "mixed or average reviews". The series was praised for the cast's acting skills, however the script was heavily criticized for trying to be too similar to the 2004 film Mean Girls and the 2019 film Booksmart.
