= Chloe Bennet =

American actress, model and singer (born 1992)

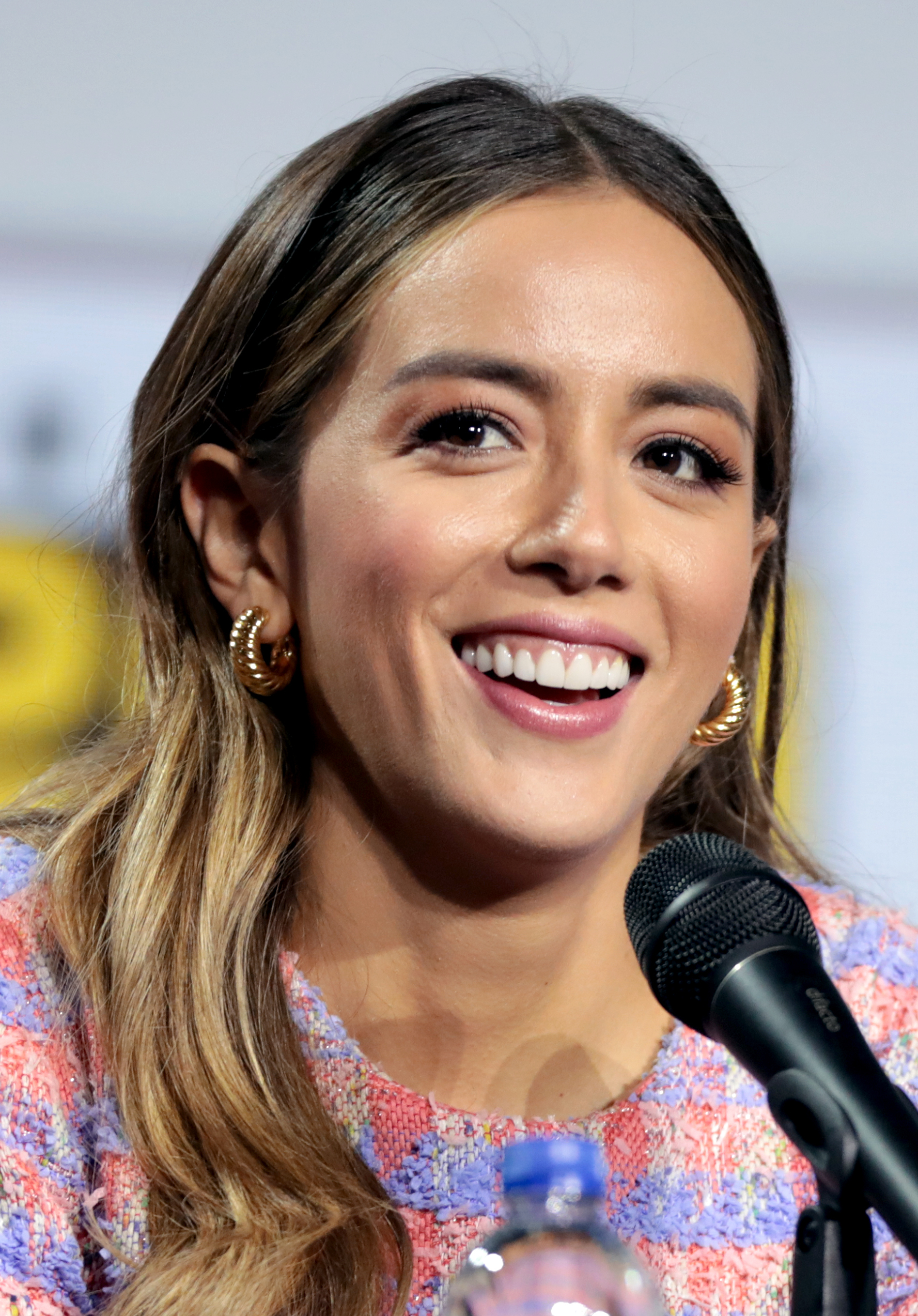
- Bennet in 2019
- Born: Chloé Wang; April 18, 1992 (age 34); Chicago, Illinois, U.S.
- Occupations: Actress; singer
- Years active: 2009–present

Chinese name
- Chinese: 汪可盈
Transcriptions
Standard Mandarin
- Hanyu Pinyin: Wāng Kěyíng

Chloé Wang (Chinese: 汪可盈; pinyin: Wāng Kěyíng; born April 18, 1992), known professionally as Chloe Bennet, is an American actress and singer. She starred as Daisy Johnson / Quake in the ABC superhero drama series Agents of S.H.I.E.L.D. (2013–2020) and voiced Yi in the animated film Abominable (2019) and the television series Abominable and the Invisible City (2022–2023).

== Early life ==
Chloe Bennet was born Chloé Wang on April 18, 1992, in Chicago, Illinois. She is the daughter of Bennet Wang, a private wealth banker and Stephanie Crane, an internist. Bennet's mother is Anglo-American and her father is Chinese. She has six brothers: three biological, two foster and one adopted; two are of African American ancestry and one is of Mexican and Filipino descent. She attended St. Ignatius College Prep.

In 2018, Bennet revealed that she has had anxiety and ADHD since childhood.

== Career ==
=== 2007–2011: Music debut and acting beginnings ===
In 2007, at age 15, Bennet moved to China to pursue a singing career; while in China, Bennet lived with her paternal grandmother and studied Mandarin. Back in the US, she released two singles "Uh Oh" and "Every Day in Between" in 2011, under her birth name Chloe Wang.

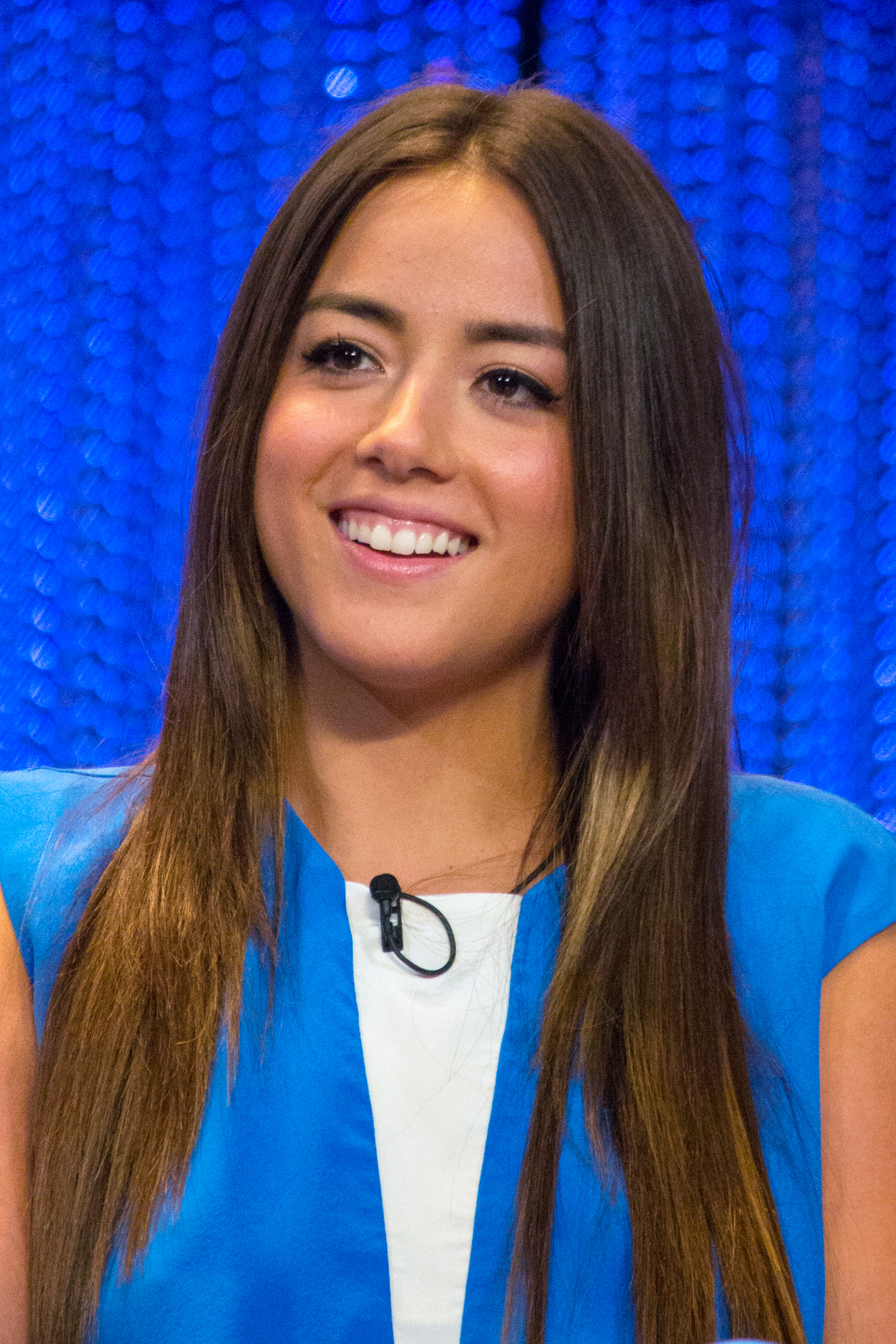
Bennet at PaleyFest 2014

In 2010 she moved to Los Angeles, California. Her first on-screen appearance was as a host for the short-lived TeenNick summer dance series The Nightlife. She appeared in the 2011 music video for South Korean band BIGBANG's "Tonight". While pursuing an acting career in Hollywood, she changed her name to "Chloe Bennet," after having trouble booking gigs with her last name. According to Bennet, using her father's first name rather than his last name avoids difficulties being cast as an ethnic Asian American while respecting her father.

=== 2012–present: Breakthrough ===
From 2012 to 2013, she had a recurring supporting role in the ABC drama series Nashville as Hailey. In December 2012, she was cast as a series regular on the ABC series Agents of S.H.I.E.L.D., which premiered on September 24, 2013. Bennet portrayed a hacker known as Skye, who was revealed to be Daisy Johnson / Quake in the second season. Bennet was awarded the "Visionary Award" by East West Players, the longest-running professional theater of color in the United States, on April 21, 2017, at their annual gala. She dedicated her award "to all the little girls who want to be a superhero; I'm just a half Chinese girl from the southside of Chicago."

In 2019, Bennet was cast in the lead role as Yi in the animated film Abominable. She appeared in the 2020 film Valley Girl, a jukebox musical remake of the 1983 film of the same name, as Karen, the "Queen Bee". The film was originally scheduled for release in June 2018, but was postponed due to controversy around one of its cast members, Logan Paul.

In March 2021, she was cast as Blossom Utonium in the upcoming CW live-action pilot Powerpuff, alongside Dove Cameron as Bubbles and Yana Perrault as Buttercup. However, after a decision to reshoot the pilot episode and subsequent scheduling conflicts with another project, Bennet left the project in August 2021. In 2023, she starred as the main actress in Mike Rohl's Married By Mistake as Riley Smith, a recent graduate of Stanford University who drunkenly marries her friend Nate Fisher. Later that year, Bennet joined the cast for the second season of Invincible.

== Advocacy ==
=== Asian-American advocacy ===
"I think what's really dangerous with what, continuously, is happening with Asian-Americans in Hollywood is there's a narrative that white Hollywood, or just any other ethnicity really in Hollywood gives to Asian-Americans that, 'You're the butt of the joke.' They're determining that we're the nerds, that we're the shy girls or that the guy that can't be sexy because he's an Asian man."

— Bennet in a September 2017 interview for NPR

Bennet has described the American film and television industry as racist against Asian-Americans and other people of Asian descent. She recalled that early in her career, her surname played a significant role in casting decisions, noting that after changing her last name from Wang to Bennet, she landed a role on her very first audition, describing it as "a pretty clear little snippet of how Hollywood works".

In 2017, Bennet praised English actor Ed Skrein's choice to step down from his role as Ben Daimio for the film Hellboy following backlash due to the character being Japanese-American. Bennet took to Instagram reminiscing on her early career, saying "Changing my last name doesn't change the fact that my BLOOD is half Chinese, that I lived in China, speak Mandarin or that I was culturally raised both American and Chinese [...] Hollywood is racist and wouldn't cast me with a last name that made them uncomfortable". In an interview for the 2024 show Interior Chinatown, Bennet said that her Chinese heritage is "always a part of every role that [she's] done". She described her upbringing as "very culturally Chinese". However, she said that she often views work as a "very 'white' thing" in which she often has to assimilate, and the Interior set was the first one where she heard Mandarin being spoken and was surrounded by a largely Asian cast and crew.

While Simu Liu's role as Shang-Chi is recognised as the first theatrical Asian superhero in the Marvel Cinematic Universe (MCU) franchise, Bennet's role as Daisy Johnson / Quake in the television show Agents of S.H.I.E.L.D. is widely considered to be the first official Asian superhero in the MCU. In 2020, Bennet spoke out against Asian culture being a trend, noting that Marvel casting her as Quake "ultimately ended up writing to fit [her] ethnicity and [her] diversity, and made that a part of the character and it only added richness to the character". Her Campus writer Abbie Jordan argued that Marvel erased Bennet's impact as the first Asian superhero, noting that while "Johnson isn't the only incredible character, her erasure in pop culture is most disappointing". In 2022, Bennet posted selfies with Liu on social media, with the caption jokingly saying, "oh look it's marvels first asian superhero..and @SimuLiu is also in the pic too".

== Filmography ==
Key
†	Denotes films that have not yet been released

=== Film ===
Year	Title	Role	Notes	Ref.
2014	Nostradamus	Lane Fisher	Short film	
2015	Tinker Bell and the Legend of the NeverBeast	Chase	Voice role	
2019	Abominable	Yi	Voice role	
2020	Valley Girl	Karen		
2020	5 Years Apart	Emma		
2023	Married by Mistake	Riley		
2023	Rally Road Racers	Shelby	Voice role	
2023	Spider-Man: Across the Spider-Verse	Daisy Johnson / Quake	Photograph	
2025	A Very Jonas Christmas Movie	Lucy		
TBA	Hello Out There †	Minnie	Post-production	

=== Television ===
Year	Title	Role	Notes
2010	The Nightlife	Herself	Host; 4 episodes
2012	Intercept	Tess	Unsold pilot
2012–2013	Nashville	Hailey	7 episodes
2013–2020	Agents of S.H.I.E.L.D.	Skye / Daisy Johnson / Quake	Main role
2014	The Birthday Boys	Verna	Episode: "Love Date Hump"
2015	Jake and the Never Land Pirates	Swifty	Voice role; Episode: "Flight of the Feathers/Captain Hookity Hook"
2015	Agents of S.H.I.E.L.D.: Double Agent	Herself	Episode: "Post Heist"
2016	Agents of S.H.I.E.L.D.: Slingshot	Daisy Johnson / Quake	3 episodes
2018	Marvel Rising: Initiation	Daisy Johnson / Quake	Voice role; 2 episodes
2018	Marvel Rising: Secret Warriors	Daisy Johnson / Quake	Voice role; Television film
2019	Marvel Rising: Chasing Ghosts	Daisy Johnson / Quake	Voice role; Television special
2019	Marvel Rising: Ultimate Comics	Daisy Johnson / Quake	Voice role; Television special
2019	Marvel Rising: Heart of Iron	Daisy Johnson / Quake	Voice role; Television special
2021	Powerpuff	Blossom	Unaired pilot
2022–2023	Abominable and the Invisible City	Yi	Voice role; Main role; Also consulting producer
2023	Dave	Robyn	Guest role; 4 episodes (Season 3)
2024–present	Invincible	Maxima'am / Riley	Voice role; 3 episodes
2024	Interior Chinatown	Lana Lee	Main role
TBA	The White Lotus †	Brynn	Filming
TBA	The Land †		Filming

== Discography ==
=== Singles ===
Year	Title	Ref.
2011	"Uh Oh" (English Version)	
2011	"Uh Oh" (Chinese Version)	
2011	"Every Day in Between"	

=== Music videos ===
Year	Title	Artist	Ref.
2011	"Tonight"	Big Bang	
2011	"Lose Control (Take a Sip)"	Chase Jordan	
2011	"Uh-Oh" (English Version)	None	—N/a
2011	"Uh-Oh" (Chinese Version)	None	—N/a
2011	"Every Day In Between"	None	—N/a

== Awards ==
Awards and nominations received by Chloe Bennet
Award	Year	Category	Work	Result	Ref.
Alliance of Women Film Journalists Awards	2020	Best Animated Female	Abominable	Nominated	
Hawaii Film Critics Society Awards	2020	Best Vocal Capture	Abominable	Nominated	
Movieguide Awards	2019	Most Inspiring Performance in Television	Agents of S.H.I.E.L.D.	Nominated	
Nickelodeon Kids' Choice Awards	2015	Favorite TV Actress	Agents of S.H.I.E.L.D.	Nominated	
Nickelodeon Kids' Choice Awards	2016	Favorite Female TV Star – Family Show	Agents of S.H.I.E.L.D.	Nominated	
Teen Choice Awards	2018	TV Actress: Action	Agents of S.H.I.E.L.D.	Nominated	
Teen Choice Awards	2019	Summer TV Star: Female	Agents of S.H.I.E.L.D.	Nominated	

== See also ==
- History of the Chinese Americans in Chicago
