= Lauren Iungerich =

American television writer, director, and producer (born 1974)

- Born: Lauren Emily Iungerich; September 14, 1974 (age 51); Los Angeles, California U.S.
- Occupations: Writer; director; producer
- Known for: Awkward, On My Block
- Spouse: Jamie Dooner (m. 2012)
- Children: 2

Lauren Emily Iungerich (/ˈjuːnərɪk/ YOO-nə-rik; born September 14, 1974) is an American writer, director and showrunner known for Awkward.

== Early life ==
Iungerich was born in Los Angeles, California to social worker mother, Viola Iungerich (née Dube), and attorney father, Russell Iungerich. She grew up in Rancho Palos Verdes, California, graduating from Palos Verdes Peninsula High School in 1992 and from Claremont McKenna College in 1996. The Palos Verdes area was the setting of Awkward.

== Career ==
At the end of her junior year of college Iungerich began interning for Hollywood producers. She worked as an assistant to producer Arnold Kopelson on U.S. Marshals and A Perfect Murder. She wrote scripts for TV show pilots and had a film script optioned by Icon Productions. She was hired to the writing staff of ABC Family's 10 Things I Hate About You based on her play Love on the Line.

She has created some web content, My Two Fans, which she describes as being inspired by Curb Your Enthusiasm.

Iungerich created the MTV sitcom Awkward. She left the show after season three. The New York Times called Awkward “the smartest, freshest, most moving sitcom of 2011” and it won the 2013 People's Choice Award for Favorite Cable Comedy.

From 2018 to 2021 she was the showrunner, director, producer, and writer for the popular Netflix show On My Block. In 2018, the show was announced to be Netflix’s most binge-watched series and Google’s tenth most top trended search in all of television. The show also won the Teen Choice Award for “Breakout Show” in 2018. In 2020, Time Magazine called On My Block one of TV's 10 Best Teen Dramas of All Time.

Iungerich directed the pilot of the Netflix limited series Boo, Bitch that she co-created and executive produced. She executive produced, co-created and directed the Netflix pilot of Freeridge—the On My Block spin-off series.

== Filmography ==
- 2023: Freeridge - Co-Creator, Executive Producer, Director, Writer
- 2022: Boo, Bitch - Co-Creator, Executive Producer, Director, Writer
- 2018–2021: On My Block - Co-creator, Executive Producer, Director, Writer
- 2015: Tough Cookie (TV movie) - Executive Producer, Director, Writer
- 2014: Damaged Goods (TV movie) – Executive Producer, Writer
- 2013: Hot Mess (TV movie) – Executive Producer, Director, Writer
- 2013: Dumb Girls (TV movie) – Executive Producer, Writer
- 2011-2015: Awkward – Creator, Executive producer (44 episodes); Writer (21 episodes); Director (11 episodes)
- 2009: 10 Things I Hate About You – Writer (1 episode "Don't Give Up")
- 2009: My Two Fans (Web series) – Creator, Producer, Director, Writer
- 1998: A Perfect Murder – Producer's Assistant
- 1998: U.S. Marshals – Producer's Assistant

== Personal life ==
Iungerich married producer and music supervisor Jamie Dooner in 2012. They reside in Southern California with their two children.
