= Albert Tsai =

American actor (born 2004)

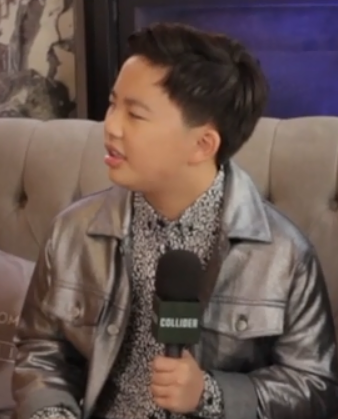
- Tsai at TIFF in September 2019
- Born: August 5, 2004 (age 21); San Jose, California, U.S.
- Education: Columbia University
- Occupation: Actor
- Years active: 2013–present
- Notable work: Coop & Cami Ask the World; Dr. Ken; Trophy Wife

Albert Tsai (born August 5, 2004) is an American actor. He is known for starring as Fred on the Disney Channel comedy series Coop & Cami Ask the World and as Bert Harrison on ABC’s Trophy Wife from 2013 to 2014. Tsai has also made recurring guest appearances as Phillip Goldstein in the ABC comedy series Fresh Off the Boat. In 2014, at the age of nine, he earned a Best Supporting Actor nomination from the Critics' Choice Television Awards for his performance on ABC’s comedy series Trophy Wife. In 2015, Tsai was named one of Entertainment Weekly's 12 Best Child Actors of 2015 for his work on Dr. Ken. In 2019, Tsai starred as Peng in the DreamWorks Animation and Pearl Studio animated feature film Abominable, released by Universal Pictures on September 27, 2019.

== Career ==
Tsai was born and raised in San Jose, California. He is bilingual and speaks Mandarin fluently. Tsai discovered his interest in acting at seven years old, while he participated in a school play. In 2013, he had his first television appearance on the CBS series How I Met Your Mother. Later that year, Tsai was cast as Bert Harrison, the adopted Chinese son of an attorney and his ex-wife, in the critically acclaimed comedy series Trophy Wife. His acting on the show earned him a nomination for Best Supporting Actor from the Critics' Choice Television Awards and he was named as a Breakout TV Star of 2013 by The Huffington Post. Tsai was a regular cast-member on the show until its cancellation in 2014.

In 2014, Tsai guest starred in the USA Network's comedy Benched, and as a boy scout who helps Betty White in the TV Land series Hot in Cleveland. He also made his standup comedy debut on The Arsenio Hall Show. In 2015, Tsai appeared in two episodes of the ABC series Fresh Off the Boat and starred in the film Grandma Money as Pope, a neglected and shy 9 year old. Later that year Tsai was cast as Dave Park, the son of main character Ken Park (Ken Jeong), in the ABC comedy Dr. Ken. Shortly after the series premiered, Tsai was named one of Entertainment Weekly's 12 Best Child Actors of 2015. In 2016, Tsai guest starred in The CW comedy Crazy Ex-Girlfriend, voiced a character on The Mr. Peabody & Sherman Show, and won the Best Young Actor in a Television series at the first Young Entertainer Awards. In 2017, Tsai guest starred in the 9JKL pilot and was promoted to series regular for the first season of CBS' family comedy.

In 2018, Tsai was cast as Fred on Disney Channel's new live-action comedy Coop and Cami Ask the World which premiered on October 12, 2018. In 2019, Tsai starred as Peng in DreamWorks’ animated feature film Abominable, released on September 27 by Universal Pictures.

== Filmography ==
=== Television ===
Year	Title	Role	Notes
2013	How I Met Your Mother	Kaden	Episode: "Something Old"
2013–2014	Trophy Wife	Bert Harrison	Main role
2014	Hot in Cleveland	Jimmy	Episode: "Stayin Alive"
2014	The Arsenio Hall Show	Himself	Episode #1.128
2014	Benched	Walter	Episode: "Campaign Contributions"
2014–2016	Home and Family	Himself	3 episodes
2015–2016	Fresh Off the Boat	Phillip Goldstein	3 episodes
2015–2017	Dr. Ken	Dave Park	Main role
2016	Crazy Ex-Girlfriend	Xiao Wong	Episode: "When Will Josh See How Cool I Am?"
2016	The Mr. Peabody & Sherman Show	Kid (voice)	2 episodes
2016	Jimmy Kimmel Live!	Himself	Episode: Lin-Manuel Miranda/Ken Jeong and Albert Tsai/ T.I.
2017–2018	9JKL	Ian	Main role
2018–2020	Coop & Cami Ask the World	Fred	Main role
2021	Action Royale	Henry	Main role

=== Film ===
Year	Title	Role	Notes
2015	Grandma Money	Pope	Lead
2016	Donald Trump's The Art of the Deal: The Movie	Kid 2	
2019	Abominable	Peng	Lead (Voice role)
2022	Diary of a Wimpy Kid: Rodrick Rules	Drew	Voice role

== Awards and nominations ==
Year	Association	Category	Nominated work	Result
2014	Critics' Choice Television Awards	Best Supporting Actor in a Comedy Series	Trophy Wife	Nominated
	Young Artist Awards	Best Performance in a TV Series - Best Supporting Young Actor	Trophy Wife	Nominated
2015	Young Artist Awards	Best Performance in a TV Series - Guest Starring Young Actor - 10 and under	Benched	Won
	Young Artist Awards	Best Performance in a TV Series - Leading Young Actor - 13 and under	Trophy Wife	Nominated
2016	Young Artist Awards	Best Performance in a TV Series - Best Supporting Young Actor	Dr. Ken	Nominated
	Young Entertainer Awards	Best Supporting Young Actor -Television Series	Dr. Ken	Won
2017	Young Artist Awards	Best Performance in a TV Series - Leading Young Actor	Dr. Ken	Nominated
