= Bryana Salaz =

American actress and singer

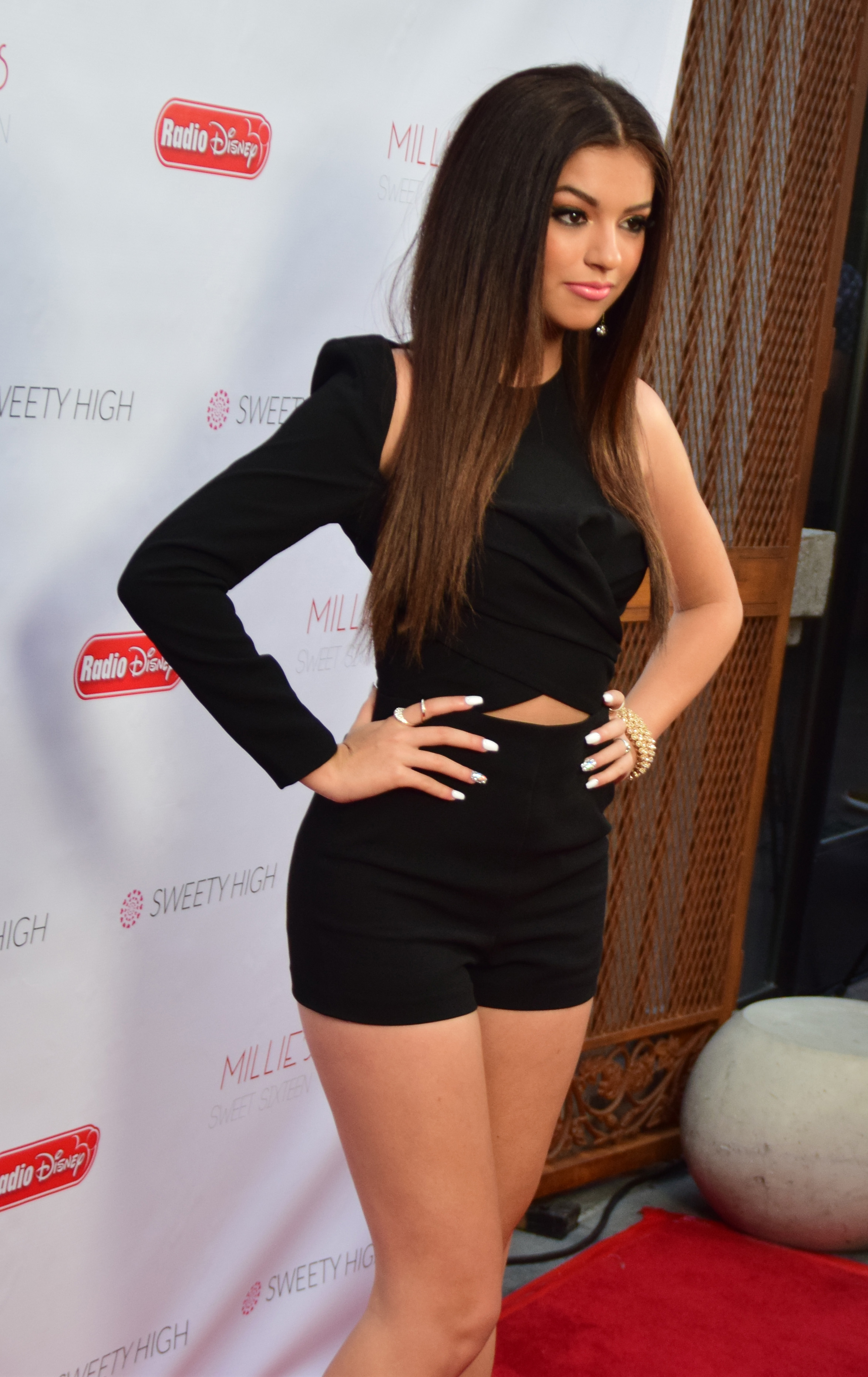
- Salaz in June 2015
- Born: August 25, 1997 (age 28)
- Occupations: Actress; singer
- Years active: 2014–present
- Musical career
- Genres: Pop
- Instrument: Vocals
- Website: www.bryanasalazmusic.com

Bryana Salaz is an American actress and singer. In 2014, she appeared on the seventh season of The Voice as part of Gwen Stefani's team. In 2019, she began portraying the role of Kaylie in the Netflix series Team Kaylie.

== Early and personal life ==
Born the daughter of Edward Salaz on August 25, 1997 and raised in a military family, Salaz has moved every two to three years since she was born. This includes attending four high schools between her freshman and senior years. The many moves taught Salaz to easily adapt to her environment. Salaz is a lesbian and of Latina descent.

== Career ==
=== Early days ===
Salaz's initial aspiration was not in music. For many years, her passion was playing soccer. She was 12 years old when her mom entered her in a military singing competition. Salaz reluctantly agreed to participate. With a lot of encouragement, she stepped onto the stage and discovered that not only did she love singing, she also loved being on stage. As a result of the competition, she was asked to perform at several venues in Hawaii such as Don Ho's Island Grill, a Martin Luther King Jr. event at Kapiolani Park, and performing "The Star Spangled Banner" for the D.A.R.E. program with an audience of about 10,000. She participated in multiple singing competitions and was awarded first place at the Iolani Talent Competition in 2010.

She branched out into performing in musicals and auditioned for High School Musical 2 at the Ft. Shafter Richardson Theatre. Although she was allowed to audition, they told her she was too young for any of the roles. The director, impressed with the audition, created a role for her as the "Jr. Sharpettes." She went on to perform in several more musicals.

Upon moving to Atlanta, Salaz continued performing in the theater and singing competitions. She auditioned for America's Got Talent in 2011 and advanced to the Las Vegas Rounds.

=== 2014: The Voice ===
In September 2014, it was announced that Salaz would compete in Season 7 of The Voice on the advice of Gwen Stefani. On the first episode of Season 7, Salaz covered Ariana Grande's "Problem." Three coaches (Adam Levine, Gwen Stefani and Blake Shelton) turned around, though Pharrell Williams said that the only reason for not turning his chair was because he felt that she would connect more with Stefani than with himself. Salaz ended up choosing Stefani as her coach. At the Battle rounds, Salaz faced Gianna Salvato where they sang "Boom Clap." She was chosen over Salvato, in the process advancing to the Knockout rounds. During the Knockouts, Salaz sang "Heart Attack" in which she defeated her opponent Sugar Joans and advanced to The Live Playoffs. During the Playoffs, Salaz performed a rendition of 5 Seconds of Summer's "Amnesia." Though her performance was highly praised by the four coaches, Salaz was eliminated the following day on the Playoffs Results night, as her teammate, Ryan Sill, was chosen over her to advance to the Top 12.

– Studio version of performance reached the top 10 on iTunes

Stage	Song	Original Artist	Date	Order	Result
Blind Audition	"Problem"	Ariana Grande	September 23, 2014	N/A	Three chairs turned Joined Team Gwen
Battle Rounds (Top 48)	"Boom Clap" (vs. Gianna Salvato)	Charli XCX	October 21, 2014	N/A	Advanced
Knockout Rounds (Top 32)	"Heart Attack" (vs. Sugar Joans)	Demi Lovato	November 3, 2014	N/A	Advanced
Live Playoffs (Top 20)	"Amnesia"	5 Seconds of Summer	November 11, 2014	4	Eliminated

Non-competition performances
Stage	Song	Original Artist	Date	Order
Live Playoffs Results	"Riptide" (with Anita Antoinette, Ricky Manning, Ryan Sill, and Taylor John Williams)	Vance Joy	November 12, 2014	3
Live Finale	"Pompeii" (with the Top 20)	Bastille	December 16, 2014	1
Live Finale	"Bang Bang" (with DaNica Shirey, Jean Kelley, Mia Pfirrman and Sugar Joans)	Jessie J, Ariana Grande and Nicki Minaj	December 16, 2014	6

=== 2015: Sweet Suspense ===
On June 11, 2015, it was announced that Salaz became a member of the girl-band Sweet Suspense, replacing Celine Polenghi as the third member of The X Factor alum group. They were set to release a single; "Money" in 2015; however, in September, it was officially announced that she had left the group to pursue a career in TV, leaving the future of the group unclear.

=== 2016: Best Friends Whenever, SNRG ===
In 2016, Salaz confirmed that she would be joining the second season of the Disney Channel show Best Friends Whenever portraying Princess Daisy. She also confirmed that she would be reuniting with Celine and former Sweet Suspense member Summer Reign, to form a new girl band called 'SNRG' and that they were talking to major record labels and film studios about their music. In May 2016, it was confirmed that she left SNRG.

== Artistry ==
=== Influences ===
In addition to Ariana Grande and Gwen Stefani, Salaz's pop style is influenced by artists such as Christina Aguilera, Beyoncé and Whitney Houston.

== Filmography ==
Television
Year	Title	Role	Notes
2015	Urban Cowboy	Anita	Unaired pilot
2016	Best Friends Whenever	Daisy	Recurring role; 7 episodes
2016	Bizaardvark	Becky	Episode: "Best Friend Tag"
2019	The Lion Guard	Anga (voice)	Main role; 20 episodes
2019	Star vs. the Forces of Evil	Teenage Meteora Butterfly (voice)	Episode: "Gone Baby Gone"
2019	Malibu Rescue: The Movie	Logan	Netflix film
2019	Malibu Rescue	Logan	Recurring role; 7 episodes
2019–2020	Team Kaylie	Kaylie Konrad	Main role
2023	Freeridge	Ines	Main role
