= List of Awkward episodes =

Awkward is an American teen comedy-drama series created by Lauren Iungerich which aired on MTV. The show's central character is teenager Jenna Hamilton (Ashley Rickards), who struggles with her identity, especially after an accident is misconstrued as a suicide attempt. The second season began on June 28, 2012, and finished on September 20, 2012. Season 3 premiered on April 16, 2013. Season 4 premiered on April 15, 2014. A Season 4 midseason finale premiered on June 17, 2014. The second half of Season 4 aired on September 23, 2014. On October 8, 2014, MTV announced the renewal of the series for a fifth season and final season. On social media, the producers and cast encouraged fans to tell MTV if they wanted the show to continue for season 6. During the course of the series, 89 episodes of Awkward aired over five seasons, concluding on May 24, 2016.

== Series overview ==
Season	Episodes		Originally released	
Season	Episodes		First released	Last released
1	12		July 19, 2011	September 27, 2011
2	12		June 28, 2012	September 20, 2012
3	20	10	April 16, 2013	June 11, 2013
3	20	10	October 22, 2013	December 17, 2013
4	21	11	April 15, 2014	June 17, 2014
4	21	10	September 23, 2014	November 25, 2014
5	24	12	August 31, 2015	November 9, 2015
5	24	12	March 15, 2016	May 24, 2016

== Episodes ==
=== Season 1 (2011) ===
No. overall	No. in season	Title	Directed by	Written by	Original release date	US viewers (millions)
1	1	"Pilot"	Millicent Shelton	Lauren Iungerich	July 19, 2011	1.72
Jenna loses her virginity to handsome, popular Matty at summer camp. She realizes getting the boy of your dreams is not all it is cracked up to be, especially when he is too embarrassed to be seen with you. Jenna also gets a "care-frontation letter" and has an accident in her bathroom, which everyone thinks was an attempted suicide, but she starts to realize this mistake might be her ticket to social visibility. She has to wear an orthopedic cast.
2	2	"Knocker Nightmare"	Ryan Shiraki	Lauren Iungerich	July 26, 2011	1.43
As Jenna's cast is removed, she falls off the table and dislocates her shoulder, so she needs to wear a sling. Mean girls Sadie and Lissa snap a nude photo of her in the girls' locker room and send it to the entire school, eliciting some surprising reactions. Matty says something mean about the photo and Jenna gets upset, but eventually Matty takes all the pictures down at their school and goes to her house, where the pair kiss.
3	3	"The Way We Weren't"	Ryan Shiraki	Erin Ehrlich	August 2, 2011	1.62
Jenna no longer needs her sling. She and Matty have been having frequent sex and she wants them to be a couple. When he suggests that she attend an "in crowd" party at Lissa's that he is going to, she thinks that he will be taking their relationship public there. She is disappointed when he almost ignores her and spends the party kissing another girl. Jenna realizes that their relationship is only casual and she starts to get to know Jake. Tamara starts to make new friends.
4	4	"The Scarlet Eye"	David Katzenberg	Meredith Philpott	August 9, 2011	1.94
Everyone who was in the hot tub at Lissa's party has conjunctivitis, including Tamara. At the homecoming bonfire, Jenna wants to DTR (define the relationship) with Matty before the bonfire where many student hook up. Jenna and Matt make out, and she asks him if they are together. He tells her that he is not ready for a relationship. Ming is annoyed with Jenna for not telling her that she had sex with Matty. Ming goes to the party, telling her parents that she is studying. Her mother sees her at the party, for which she punishes her by making her wear their dog's shock collar.
5	5	"Jenna Lives"	David Katzenberg	Kelly Fullerton	August 16, 2011	1.88
Jenna becomes the target of a strange stalker who falsely advertises her suicide. After confronting him, she ends up in detention, where she meets "Jenna Plus," a junior she suspects is Matty's new girlfriend. When Jenna Plus, actually named Olivia, invites Jenna to skip detention, she finds Olivia sweet and starts to wonder if her issues with Matty are because of how she sees herself. While talking to Jake, Jenna admits she likes a guy who is already taken, and Jake mistakenly thinks she is talking about him. He later tells her that if the guy did not have a girlfriend, he would be all over her, and kisses her. Jenna quickly leaves, confused. Meanwhile, it turns out Olivia is actually Matty's "girlfriend-in-law," as she is dating his older brother.
6	6	"Queen Bee-atches"	Lauren Iungerich	Lauren Iungerich & Nate Federman	August 23, 2011	2.36
Jenna is forced to mingle with the mean girls at an elite charity event for her mother. Later, things become even more awkward when she runs into Matty and Jake. Jake acts strangely when Jenna comes in the room and tells Matty about the kiss. Jenna and Tamara sneak into Sadie's room and find her diary/food journal. Jenna uses it to her advantage and blackmails Sadie into accepting her mom into the club. Later, Jenna's mom over hears the other moms talking trash behind her back, discreetly ruins a vase, and quickly leaves with Jenna. Jake asks Jenna if they can talk.
7	7	"Over My Dead Body"	Ryan Shiraki	Cassie Pappas	August 30, 2011	1.99
A mock DUI event is held at the school, and Jenna is cast as the victim. Jake is the male lead and begins to develop feelings for Jenna, which causes Matty to become jealous.
8	8	"The Adventures of Aunt Ally and the Lil' Bitch"	David Katzenberg	Lauren Iungerich & Andrew C. Veeder	September 6, 2011	2.08
Jenna throws a wild keg party to try to impress Matty, with help from her mom and her mom's best friend, Ally. The next day, a hungover Jenny struggles to reconstruct the events of the night, which ended with Jenna giving a lecture to Jake, hurting Matty's feelings and sharing a kiss with Ricky (Tamara's long time crush, on/off boyfriend). After Tamara throws out her and Jenna's best friend picture, and their friendship, she tells Jenna that she is "so glad she wrote that letter", talking about the "carefrontation".
9	9	"My Super Bittersweet Sixteen"	David Katzenberg	Erin Ehrlich	September 13, 2011	2.28
On Jenna's 16th birthday, Valerie surprises her with a birthday rap in the school cafeteria. The rest of the day does not go very well for Jenna, but at the exact time of her birth, Matty knocks on her door to reveal that he wants to be more than friends and the episode ends with them making out.
10	10	"No Doubt"	Patrick Norris	Kelly Fullerton & Cassie Pappas & Meredith Philpott	September 20, 2011	2.11
Jenna notices a fight between Jake and Lissa, triggered by Jake admitting he kissed Jenna. This leads to an awkward conversation between Jake, Lissa, and Valerie about how he can make it right. Meanwhile, Jenna tries to reconnect with Tamara with Ming's help. Tamara forgives Jenna but admits she did not write the letter, just said it out of hurt. She theorizes that Matty wrote it, making Jenna reconsider her relationship with Matty. Matty plans a dinner date for Jenna at his family's restaurant, which eases her concerns when his uncle mentions how Matty's never taken a girl there before. Back at Jenna's house, Tamara and Ming interrupt their date with games and confessions, but Matty wins them over with his sincerity. Before leaving, Tamara whispers to Jenna that she no longer believes Matty wrote the letter. Meanwhile, Lissa and Sadie team up to get Jake to end his friendship with Jenna, but Jake apologizes to Jenna and breaks up with Lissa.
11	11	"I Am Jenna Hamilton"	Patrick Norris	Erin Ehrlich & Lauren Iungerich	September 27, 2011	2.24
Matty and Jenna have a barbecue with her parents and discuss the upcoming formal dance. Though Matty never officially asks Jenna to the dance, he hints at it by asking about her dress color and if she is a "limo girl." Jenna sees other boys making grand gestures to ask their dates, like Jake, who gives her a mix CD with the question printed on it. Jenna turns him down, saying she already has a date. Matty almost confesses to Jake but does not, and later suggests to Jenna that they skip the Formal without explaining why. Meanwhile, Sadie steals Jenna's file, and Jenna is shocked to be nominated for Sophomore Princess, only to find her personal letter printed on the ballot. Realizing she deserves more from Matty, Jenna tells him she is done with him and refuses to go to the Formal or anywhere with him.
12	12	"Fateful"	Lauren Iungerich	Lauren Iungerich	September 27, 2011	2.24
Jenna agrees to go to the Formal with Jake and convinces him to bring Tamara along, with Ming tagging along too. Meanwhile, Matty decides not to give up on Jenna but arrives at her house too late—she has already left for the dance. At the Formal, Jenna and Jake have a great time, and she starts to think Jake might be the one for her. They kiss, but Matty arrives, and without telling Jake, Jenna and Matty discuss their relationship. Jenna ultimately chooses Jake, realizing it is too late with Matty. Later, after more kisses, Jenna invites Jake inside but asks to wait before moving forward, and he agrees. When they accidentally set off the alarm, Jake leaves. Searching for the alarm code, Jenna finds a notepad with paper matching the letter she received and realizes her mother wrote it.

=== Season 2 (2012) ===
No. overall	No. in season	Title	Directed by	Written by	Original release date	US viewers (millions)
13	1	"Resolutions"	Lauren Iungerich	Lauren Iungerich	June 28, 2012	2.15
Winter Break is heading to an end, that is not until after a New Year's Party at Matty's house, where Jenna has to make decision on who she wants to spend the night with, and be with in the new year. Matty spends the night with an unexpected person. Tamara has relationship problems with Ricky. Lacey get confronted with a certain letter.
14	2	"Sex, Lies and the Sanctuary"	Erin Ehrlich	Erin Ehrlich	July 5, 2012	1.76
It is revealed a video camera was installed in the Sanctuary that has recorded all the events that have happened over the year. Jenna and Matty debate whether or not to tell Jake about their private relationship. Matty confesses to Jenna that he loves her, but Jenna states she has moved on and really likes Jake. Jake reveals to Jenna that he is jealous of her previous boyfriend and does not wish to know anything about that relationship. Jenna pressures her mom into telling her dad about writing the letter.
15	3	"Three's a Crowd"	David Katzenberg	Kelly Fullerton	July 12, 2012	1.72
Jenna and Jake's relationship is finally going smoothly- that is, until Matty starts tagging along and trying to tempt Jenna, constantly trying to seduce her. Meanwhile, Val gets promoted to vice principal and takes her new job a little too seriously, and Jenna's parents are now separated. Her father went to stay with Jenna's grandmother while her mother stays home and adjusts to being lonely.
16	4	"Are You There God? It's Me, Jenna"	Ryan Shiraki	Annabel Oakes	July 19, 2012	1.58
Post her parents separation, Jenna feels responsible. In an impulsive effort to absolve herself, she seeks refuge from her problems in a higher power with Lissa at Church Camp. Little does she know that Sadie has decided to tag along as well. With the help of Valerie, Lacey attempts to eat alone for the first time.
17	5	"My Love Is a Black Heart"	David Katzenberg	Michael J. Cinquemani	July 26, 2012	1.79
Valentine's Day has arrived and dividing the school between swooning lovers and jealous haters. As Jenna prepares to spend her first V-day with a boyfriend, will jealousy rear its ugly head for her and Tamara as they confront the possibility that their ex's are moving on without them?
18	6	"What Comes First: Sex or Love?"	Ryan Shiraki	Lauren Iungerich	August 2, 2012	1.82
Still reeling from Jake's proclamation of love, Jenna considers sleeping with him, believing sex might bring her some clarity about her own feelings. However, when Jenna leans over, she hits the PA system button and ends up telling the whole school that she wants to sleep with Jake. Meanwhile, her mother's best friend Ally announces that she is engaged, and her fiancé, "Dan the Man", turns out to be Sadie's uncle.
19	7	"Another One Bites the Dust"	Lauren Iungerich	Lauren Iungerich	August 9, 2012	1.82
Jenna is determined to take her relationship with Jake to the next level, but there are obstacles, including her Aunt Ally's wedding, a man from her mom's past and a scheming Sadie. Jake tries to stand up for Tamara when Sadie will not stop making out with Ricky in public, rubbing it in Tamara's face, and Sadie reveals to Jake about Jenna and Matty's relationship.
20	8	"Time After Time"	Lauren Iungerich	Erin Ehrlich & Lauren Iungerich	August 16, 2012	1.95
Jake gets upset when he learns of Jenna and Matty's past, breaking up with Jenna saying 'the timing wasn't right'. Meanwhile Lacey ends up dancing with her old boyfriend Ben at the wedding. Jenna's dad ends up coming finding them dancing and is heartbroken.After Jake breaks up with her, Matty later shows up at Jenna's house to comfort her. Jenna tells Matty she is still in love with him and end up kissing as Jake watches to his horror from the window.
21	9	"Homewrecker Hamilton"	Joe Nussbaum	Kelly Fullerton & Vera Herbert	August 23, 2012	2.19
Jenna desperately tries to fix things with Jake, but he is convinced that she is a cheater, with him having photo evidence of Jenna & Matty's makeout session the night before. Tensions between Jake and Matty come out during a pep rally, resulting in a fist fight. Meanwhile, Jenna's dad gets her a car and she takes this as a sign of her parents' forthcoming divorce. Ming also finds herself on the outs with the Asian Mafia when it is revealed that her boyfriend, Fred Wu, used to date Becca.
22	10	"Pick Me, Choose Me, Love Me"	Joe Nussbaum	Lauren Iungerich	August 30, 2012	1.74
Jake and Matty demand answers from Jenna after reading her blog. Jenna gets confused on who she likes more but does not pick on the spot. Jake and Matty become friends again and constantly ask Jenna who she picks. Meanwhile, Jenna's mom gets revealed as the person who wrote the letter and gets criticized by many people. Jenna and the boys are in good speaking terms again.
23	11	"Once Upon a Blog"	Michael Blieden	Erin Ehrlich	September 13, 2012	1.78
Jenna fictionalizes her Blog in an attempt to change her fate. By the end of the episode she changes her blog to private again, and figures out who she wants to be with.
24	12	"The Other Shoe"	Michael Blieden	Lauren Iungerich	September 20, 2012	2.17
After a tumultuous sophomore year, Jenna prepares for her trip to Europe while her decision about the boys goes public.

=== Season 3 (2013) ===
On July 16, 2012, Awkward. was renewed for an extended third season of 20 episodes. A promo was released March 11, 2013, which revealed that season three would begin on April 16, 2013, with a double bill. The season took a break after episode 10 aired on June 11 and returned on October 22. This season is the last to feature creator Lauren Iungerich as showrunner.

No. overall	No. in season	Title	Directed by	Written by	Original release date	US viewers (millions)
Part 1
25	1	"Cha-Cha-Cha-Changes"	Lauren Iungerich	Lauren Iungerich	April 16, 2013	2.14
Jenna and the others start their junior year, and she feels isolated from her friends after their summer vacation in Europe. Everyone suspects Sadie is pregnant, but reveals to Lissa that she and her family are now broke. However, Jenna herself goes through a pregnancy scare, but is relieved to find out she is not pregnant, and her mother convinces her not to tell Matty about the whole ordeal. Ricky Schwartz dies.
26	2	"Responsibly Irresponsible"	Lauren Iungerich	Lauren Iungerich	April 16, 2013	2.14
The school mourns Ricky's death and hold a vigil/kegger party to express their feelings. Sadie and Tamara reluctantly bond over their anger at Ricky. Jenna has a pregnancy scare but confides in Jake instead of Matty. Jenna joins a creative writing class and meets Collin, a charming classmate.
27	3	"A Little Less Conversation"	Erin Ehrlich	Erin Ehrlich	April 23, 2013	1.34
Matty has become distant since finding out about the pregnancy scare. Ming tries to hide from the Asian Mafia. Sadie feels lonely and calls up Matty for support. Matty tells Jenna that they need to talk, which prompts her to get Tamara to arrange a group date to avoid having alone time with Matty. Matty becomes jealous of Jenna and Jake's easygoing friendship.
28	4	"Let's Talk About Sex"	Hal Olofsson	Christy Stratton	April 30, 2013	1.38
Jenna's parents finds out that she and Matty are sexually active and insist on telling Matty's parents. The McKibbens come over for dinner and the two families argue over their parenting styles. Meanwhile, Tamara and Jake are contemplating sex for the first time.
29	5	"Indecent Exposure"	Joe Nussbaum	Lauren Iungerich & Michael J. Cinquemani	May 7, 2013	1.38
Matty moves in with the Hamilton's after a dispute with his parents, but it proves to be too stressful for Jenna. Tamara invites herself to a sleepover at Sadie's despite Jake's warnings.
30	6	"That Girl Strikes Again"	Joe Nussbaum	Todd Waldman	May 14, 2013	1.12
It is Halloween and Jenna feels that she is not good enough for Matty after a "Hot/Not" list is published at school. The gang attends a party hosted by Angelique, Collin's girlfriend. Tamara accidentally becomes attached a stranger while Jake unknowingly gets high. Jenna finds that she is comfortable in Collin's crowd while Matty feels out of place. Sadie meets Austin, a potential love interest.
31	7	"Guilt Trippin'"	Ryan Shiraki	Vera Herbert	May 21, 2013	1.17
During the homecoming pinnings, Jenna feels bad for the single girls who do not have dates to the dance, so she decides to take a stand, focusing on a social outsider named Christy, who was a childhood friend of hers. Jake teaches Matty how to dance. Meanwhile, Ming turns to Sadie for help in playing mind games on Becca.
32	8	"Rubbed Raw and Reeling"	Ryan Shiraki	Jamie Dooner & Lauren Iungerich	May 28, 2013	1.35
Jenna's creative writing instructor challenges her to read a personal piece at an open mic. Matty and Jake have a "brobeque" and challenge each other to forget about their girlfriends for one night.
33	9	"Reality Check"	Lauren Iungerich	Erin Ehrlich	June 4, 2013	0.99
Jenna's realizes she may have feelings for Collin after he keeps popping in her head while writing. Ming deals with Becca with physical violence.
34	10	"Redefining Jenna"	Lauren Iungerich	Lauren Iungerich	June 11, 2013	1.22
Tamara co-hosts the big Black Friday party, pushing Jake to the edge with her bossiness. Ming becomes the new head of Asian mafia. Meanwhile Jenna gets invited to a party from Collin but Matty does not want to attend. Jenna goes alone and Collin admits his feelings for Jenna. The two kiss and Jenna returns to Matty.
Part 2
35	11	"Surprise!"	Lauren Iungerich	Lauren Iungerich	October 22, 2013	1.56
Jenna desperately wants to cut ties with Collin, but finds it hard to be faithful. Tamara has trouble keeping secrets. Lacey wants to throw Jenna a surprise party, but ends up canceling it when Jenna expresses her disinterest in celebrating. In a surprise turn of events, everyone gathers at the Hamilton house for the party, but they are all in shock as Jenna and Collin walk in making out.
36	12	"And Then What Happened"	Lauren Iungerich	Lauren Iungerich	October 29, 2013	1.21
Everyone gathers to re-tell what happened at Jenna's birthday party and to speculate whether or not Jenna and Matty are still a couple. Jenna refuses to leave her house and Lacey prods her for information. Jenna and Matty finally meet up. Although Matty is willing to eventually forgive Jenna and go back to the way they were, Jenna breaks up with him, thinking that they both probably deserve better.
37	13	"Taking Sides"	Steve Gainer	Erin Ehrlich & Michael J. Cinquemani	November 5, 2013	1.02
Matty wants to reconcile with Jenna, but she is now officially dating Collin, which displeases everyone. After rejecting Austin, Sadie sets him up with Lissa but quickly has second thoughts. Jenna hosts a barbecue to introduce Collin to her friends, but it does not go as planned. Jake gets angry with Tamara for knowing about Jenna's cheating. Feeling abandoned by her best friends, Jenna bombards Tamara and Ming with texts, leaving her with only Collin as a friend.
38	14	"The Bad Seed"	Gregory Guzik	Jen Braeden	November 12, 2013	1.09
Jenna and Collin nearly get arrested for smoking pot in his car. Jenna further alienates herself from her friends, as well as her parents. Jenna's friends and family try to warn her that Collin is a bad influence. Ally becomes Sadie's legal guardian.
39	15	"A Very Special Episode of Awkward"	Joe Nussbaum	Erin Ehrlich	November 19, 2013	1.06
Valerie recruits students to be in her After School Special video, which is based on Jenna's life. The gang hopes to convince Jenna to rethink her life. Jenna attempts to ditch the project and argues with her friends during filming. Val catches Jenna lighting a joint at school and suspends her. Jenna rebuffs Val's attempts to reach out to her and harshly mocks her.
40	16	"Less Than Hero"	Joe Nussbaum	Joe Nussbaum	November 19, 2013	1.06
Jenna writes a mean essay about Val and gives it to Mr. Hart to publish and rejects Val's attempts to make up. Lacey and Kevin struggle to show tough love to Jenna. Jake and Tamara run against each other for class president. After Collin and Angelique spike her drink, Jenna finally sees Collin for who he is and calls Matty for help. Jenna thanks Matty for leaving his new girlfriend Devon to rescue her.
41	17	"The Campaign Fail"	David Katzenberg	Christy Stratton	November 26, 2013	1.05
Jenna attempts reconciling with her parents and friends, but the gang is reluctant to welcome her back. The presidential race heats up between Jake and Tamara. Tamara wins the election but Jake dumps her shortly after. Ming begins to lose control of the Asian Mafia. Jenna learns that she caused a fight between Matty and his new girlfriend. Jenna continues to see Collin's true colors. Val gets indefinitely suspended from her job because of Jenna's article.
42	18	"Old Jenna"	David Katzenberg	Jamie Dooner & Lauren Iungerich	December 3, 2013	1.13
43	19	"Karmic Relief"	Erin Ehrlich	Erin Ehrlich	December 10, 2013	1.03
Jenna still feels guilty about losing Val's job, so she seeks to make amends. She enlists her mother's help to get Val to attend the school hearing and raise support for Val. Meanwhile, it is prom season at Palos Hills and Jenna is convinced that Matty will ask her in the midst of their renewed friendship. Ming faces a coup d'état from the Asian mafia when former leader Becca returns. Note: This is a special 1 hour episode.
44	20	"Who I Want to Be"	Joe Nussbaum	Lauren Iungerich	December 17, 2013	1.30
Jenna is upset when Matty asks Bailey to prom. She finds solace in a self-discovery novel that was written by none other than Mr. Hart. In a moment of selflessness, Jenna gets Bailey and Matty to go to prom together, despite her still longing for Matty. Meanwhile, Jake insists on picking out his own tux and Ming struggled to tell Fred that she is not ready for sex. Sadie finds herself falling in love with Austin. Jenna finishes her final creative assignment and attends prom alone and happy. Note: This is a special 1 hour episode.

=== Season 4 (2014) ===
On August 5, 2013, Awkward was renewed for a fourth season. Chris Alberghini and Mike Chessler will replace Lauren Iungerich as showrunners. The season will consist of 20 episodes. Season four premiered with a special one-hour episode on April 15, 2014. The second half of the premiered on September 23, 2014. The season finale aired November 25, 2014.

No. overall	No. in season	Title	Directed by	Written by	Original release date	US viewers (millions)
Part 1
45	1	"No Woman Is an Island"	Peter Lauer	Mike Chessler & Chris Alberghini	April 15, 2014	1.63
Jenna is caught masturbating by her parents and it is not long until the news spreads. As senior year begins, Tamara takes her role as being student president too seriously, which leads to a rocky relationship with Jake. Jenna finds out that Matty is no longer with Bailey and that he has been single all summer. Ming has broken up with Fred and moved to Vermont over the summer, but a new girl, Eva, takes her place and decides to befriend everyone. Jenna and Matty hook up again. Note: This is a special 1 hour episode.
46	2	"Listen to This"	Ashley Rickards	Christy Stratton	April 22, 2014	1.25
Jenna must stay silent for 24 hours after sustaining a dental injury, but is desperate to talk to Matty, who has discovered a life altering secret. Jake makes a difficult decision regarding his relationship with Tamara. Meanwhile, Sadie and Lissa's friendship continued to be troubled due to Lissa's cheer captain position.
47	3	"Touched by an Angel"	Jay Karas	Jenna Lamia	April 29, 2014	1.02
Jenna and Matty become friends with benefits, but it is clear that Matty is instrested in the benefits part of the friendship. Jenna commits herself to the school's peer guidance program and tries to mentor a troubled freshman. Meanwhile, Tamara becomes annoyed with Jake after his music makes him more popular at school.
48	4	"Sophomore Sluts"	Jay Karas	Sarah Walker	May 6, 2014	1.21
It is Spirit Week at Palos Hills High and the seniors are struggling to stay upbeat. Matty ignores Jenna in favor of hanging out with Eva and Sophomore Slut MacKenzie. Sadie tries to convince Lissa to give up cheer captaincy by quoting the Bible. Tamara catfishes Jake to keep tabs on him after their break-up.
49	5	"Overnight"	Nell Scovell	Leila Cohan-Miccio	May 13, 2014	1.08
Jenna and Tamara pay an overnight visit to a college. Jenna meets Luke, an intellectual college boy, who helps her moves on from Matty. Lacey tries to recapture her missed youth. Sadie and Eva's rivalry is taken to a new level. Jake becomes obsessed with Tamara's fake profile. Sadie and Matty become closer friends but Eva catches them in incriminating position.
50	6	"Crowning Moments"	Ryan Shiraki	Liz Sczudlo	May 20, 2014	1.04
Matty's becomes tired with his mother's obsession with perfection. As a result, he makes a huge scene at the PHHS pageant embarrassing Jenna, his mom. Jake discovers who "Autumn" really is . Jenna's parents invites Luke to the Mr. PHHS pageant that goes awry. Sadie makes a bet with Lissa that she can make Kyle Mr. PHHS.
51	7	"After Hours"	Ryan Shiraki	Ryan O'Connell	May 27, 2014	1.19
The gang heads to a concert. Jenna sets Matty up with Eva but realizes that she still has feelings for him. Eva blackmails Sadie with the picture. Tamara runs into trouble and has no choice but to Call Jake. After the group ditches them, Matty and Jake are caught underage drinking and the two get arrested.
52	8	"Prison Breaks"	Ryan Shiraki	Todd Waldman	June 3, 2014	1.20
Matty and Jake spend a night in prison. Jenna and Tamara visit Luke at college. All Jenna wants to do is have fun, although she learns that Luke has to take his studies seriously. Tamara has a kind of experience that she could not get in high school.
53	9	"My Personal Statement"	Peter Lauer	Allison M. Gibson	June 10, 2014	1.05
It is time for everyone to send in their college apps and Jenna and Tamara do not want to face the reality of separating once high school is over. Jenna helps Matty with his essay but Eva sabotages her. Meanwhile, Val gets a makeover from Lacey to impress a former crush at her high school reunion. Sadie, Lissa, and Jake run a food truck.
54	10	"Snow Job"	Peter Lauer	Mike Chessler & Chris Alberghini	June 17, 2014	1.13 1.22
55	11	"Snow Job"	Peter Lauer	Mike Chessler & Chris Alberghini	June 17, 2014	1.13 1.22
The Palos Hills High seniors are on their annual ski trip, and Eva continues to antagonize Jenna. At the lodge, Jenna is torn between her feelings for Luke and Matty. Sadie discovers Eva's real name is Amber, and she’s been home-schooled since being expelled at nine for stabbing a classmate. Eva’s creepy room is full of stalkerish bulletin boards about Jenna and Matty. Sadie tries to warn Matty about Eva's secrets. Sadie shares Eva's story with Jenna, and they team up to uncover the truth. Eva claims she is pregnant, and Matty refuses to leave her. Jenna tries to make amends with Luke after leaving him out.
Part 2
56	12	"Finals"	Rebecca Asher	Leila Cohan-Miccio	September 23, 2014	1.22
Following the drama of the ski trip, Jenna decides it is best to spend her time focusing on her finals. Matty starts to have suspicions about Eva after the secret of her pregnancy was revealed to the whole school.
57	13	"Auld Lang Party"	Mike Chessler	Sarah Walker	September 30, 2014	1.25
On New Year's Eve, Jenna wants to celebrate quietly with Matty, now that they were back on stable ground after Eva. However things do not go as planned when Matty turns their evening in to a group activity at Sadie's house party. While there, Jenna and Matty make a pact not to hook up with anyone. Matty and his mom finally have a heart to heart at the party.
58	14	"Welcome to Hell"	Chris Alberghini	Ryan O'Connell	October 7, 2014	0.95
After kissing sophomore Owen, Jenna lets him know that it was a one-time thing. Meanwhile, Lissa attempts to convince her father to out himself to her mother. Also, as college acceptance letters comes in, it is a question of who stays together and who splits up after the year is over.
59	15	"Bonfire of the Vanities"	Gregory Guzik	Liz Sczudlo	October 14, 2014	0.93
The annual senior bonfire becomes a powder keg when Jenna and Tamara find the boys' girl-rating tradition known as the Phone Book.
60	16	"#Drama"	Claire Scanlon	Steve Yockey	October 21, 2014	1.02
The battle of the sexes erupts once again when Jenna and Tamara's Dude Database goes viral and reveals a secret that causes friction in their own friendship.
61	17	"The New Sex Deal"	Claire Scanlon	Todd Waldman	October 28, 2014	0.82
As Valentine's Day approaches, the entire school is mad at Jenna over the Dude Database, while Tamara refuses to come clean about her involvement. Jenna's solution is to rent a senior party bus, but things do not go as planned.
62	18	"Girl Rules"	Uta Briesewitz	Jenna Lamia	November 4, 2014	0.82
Thinking that they have bad blood, Jenna competes with Gabby to make Matty's 18th birthday special, but the two end up forging a real friendship. Meanwhile, Sadie and Tamara fight over control of the cheer squad in Lissa's absence. Jenna also receives a surprising letter in the mail.
63	19	"Over the Hump"	Uta Briesewitz	Allison M. Gibson	November 11, 2014	1.27
Jenna feels guilty about her little kiss with Matty, but accidentally tells Gabby and puts herself on bad terms with the both of them. Sadie invites everyone on a spring break trip and also hires Jake to edit her video entry for a scholarship contest, with hilarious results.
64	20	"Sprang Break (Part 1)"	Peter Lauer	Mike Chessler & Chris Alberghini	November 18, 2014	0.91
The crew arrives in Rosarito, Mexico for spring break. Matty invites Jenna to come with him to meet his biological father, but Gabby shows up at the last minute and takes her spot instead. Jenna finally gets a college acceptance and Sadie wins her scholarship to Columbia. Jake and Tamara find out that they are famous in Japan. Lissa decides to start living life on the wild side after escaping from her parents.
65	21	"Sprang Break (Part 2)"	Peter Lauer	Mike Chessler & Chris Alberghini	November 25, 2014	1.04
Spring break continues in Rosarito. Matty bonds with his biological father, Daniel, who plants doubts about his relationship with Gabby. Jake and Gabby sleep together after Jake is rejected from all the colleges he applied to. Lissa runs into her father at a bar, and they have a heart-to-heart. Matty asks Lacey if she has seen Jenna, and she tells him to let her go. Jenna learns she is going to be a big sister and connects with a marine named Brian. In the end, Matty watches Jenna and Brian at the beach, realizing he still has feelings for her but must move on.

=== Season 5 (2015–16) ===
On October 8, 2014, the show was renewed for a fifth season, which premiered on August 31, 2015. Although executive producers Chris Alberghini and Mike Chessler revealed, in November 2015, that they were hopeful that the show would be renewed for a sixth season, the series has not returned. Season five had a mid-season break, from November 2015 to March 2016, returning March 15 with its final twelve weekly episodes.

No. overall	No. in season	Title	Directed by	Written by	Original release date	US viewers (millions)
Part 1
66	1	"Prank Amateurs"	Peter Lauer	Mike Chessler	August 31, 2015	1.29
The Awkward gang returns from Spring Break to find the entire Senior class naked in the janitor's closet. While waiting for the Senior Streak, Jenna overhears Gabby and Jake discussing their hookup in Mexico but decides to keep it to herself, accidentally ruining the Senior prank. Sadie's mother unexpectedly visits to repair their relationship. Matty, thinking his feelings for Jenna were a phase, commits to Gabby. Tamara sets a wedding date with Adam, while Jenna misses her chemistry with Brian. After celebrating the prank's salvage, Gabby discovers Matty's plan to break up with her, leading to her breaking up with him and revealing her hookup with Jake. The episode ends with Matty punching Jake and storming off.
67	2	"Short Circuit Party"	Peter Lauer	Chris Alberghini	September 7, 2015	0.68
While being forced to clean the mess left from the last episode, Jenna accidentally shuts off the power after throwing a bucket of water, intended to get Jake, at the school's fuse box. However, this causes her to gain popularity when everyone believes that she intentionally did it in order to get school cancelled. Jenna has a party at the beach. Also, Val moves in with Jenna with the school's power out. Sadie's mother tries to win her happiness with a new Fiat.
68	3	"Jenna in Wonderland"	Gregory Guzik	Anna Christopher	September 14, 2015	0.76
Jenna looks through party pictures, wishing she had been there. At school, she walks with Tamara and is greeted by everyone, including the most popular guy. The Julies ask for a selfie, and Tamara tells Jenna she is now at the top of the social ladder. Meanwhile, Matty, after his viral video, is at the bottom. Jenna goes on a triple date with the Julies and college boys, while Kyle gives Matty advice on being unpopular. During the date, Jenna realizes being popular is not as fun as she thought and leaves for pizza with Tamara. Matty goes to a concert with Kyle, and when Jenna texts him for pizza, he declines, leaving both Jenna and Matty happy in their own ways.
69	4	"Now You See Me, Now I Don't"	Chris Alberghini	Ryan O'Connell	September 21, 2015	0.53
Jenna is upset when her yearbook nickname is "Most Depressing" and wonders what Matty will write in hers. Meanwhile, Sadie's mom tries to win back her daughter through a typical Palos Hills mother-daughter imitation, with Ally offering her support. Matty hangs out with Kyle, watching the mother's imitations. Tamara promises to end her engagement with Adam but ultimately does not. Lissa becomes the new school counselor. Lacey imitates a drunk Jenna, hurting her feelings. By the end, Sadie starts forgiving her mom, while they both dislike Ally. Jenna helps Lacey with her imitation and gets mad at Matty for not writing something meaningful in her yearbook, but Matty explains she is his best friend.
70	5	"The Dis-Engagement Dinner"	Ashley Rickards	Shawn Simmons	September 28, 2015	0.75
Jenna is forced to throw Tamara a fake engagement party while Lacey and Kevin are out of town. She expects a casual event but discovers it is overly fancy. Adam invites Brian, and Jenna tries to avoid him while keeping Tamara's secret. Sadie and Sergio argue about marriage, and later, Sadie, Sergio, Matty, Jake, and Gabby attend the party. Drunk Gabby tells Jenna that Matty is still in love with her, causing Jenna to overthink and give an awful toast, realizing she might still have feelings for him. Brian talks to Jenna, and she reveals Tamara's secret, but Adam overhears and storms off. Jenna feels bad for Tamara while still confused about Gabby's revelation.
71	6	"Don't Dream It's Over"	Brian Dannelly	Leila Cohan-Miccio	October 5, 2015	0.58
After Adam storms off and dinner ends, Jenna and Tamara plan to watch Sex and the City, but instead find a porn video Kevin left for Lacey. Tamara believes Adam is her "Mr. Big" and argues with Jenna, blaming her for all her failed relationships. Tamara goes to the Base, but finds a sober Gabby in her car. Jenna reflects on Tamara’s words, and Jake, looking for Gabby, confirms Jenna’s fears about ruining relationships. Tamara waits until morning to speak to Adam, who rejects her despite her self-centered confession. Jenna dreams of Sex and the City, where Sadie, Tamara, and Lissa accuse her of ruining every relationship. She talks to several exes in the dream and realizes she still loves Matty.returns the ring, Adam still rejects her. Jake and Gabby comfort Tamara. Jenna's dream leads her to the conclusion that she never stopped being in love with Matty.
72	7	"The Big Reveal"	Joanna Kerns	Allison M. Gibson	October 12, 2015	0.50
Lacey asks Jenna to prepare a gender reveal party. Matty gets accepted to Berkeley just as Jenna is ready to tell him that she loves him, but later decides to keep this to herself as they prepare to go to separate colleges. Valerie returns to announce her engagement to Biggie, just as Lacey finds out she is having a girl.
73	8	"An Indecent Promposal"	Mike Chessler	Sarah Walker	October 19, 2015	0.71
Jenna and Tamara both struggle with their own disappointments and issues over the impending prom (and their respective lack of dates). A small and brief prom rebellion ensues, and in the end Jenna decides to go with someone she truly loves (while grappling with her renewed love for Matty).
74	9	"Say No to the Dress"	Uta Briesewitz	Jenna Lamia	October 26, 2015	0.63
It is Prom Time at Palos Hills, which means it is also time for drama. Despite everything that is going on, Jenna is determined to have a dream prom, regardless of the many obsticals she faces along the way.
75	10	"Reality Does Not Bite"	Uta Briesewitz	Jenna Lamia	November 2, 2015	0.81
Jenna and Tamara plan to go to Prom together without any dates. Jenna's prom dress get ruined before prom, with all the shops closed, Tamara calls in a favor to get Jenna a new dress. Matty and Sadie go to prom as friends, after leaving prom early, Sadie convinces Matty to go back tell Jenna how he fells about her. Adam surprised Tamara at Prom and proposed to date again. After seeing Tamara happy and ruining her dress, Jenna leave prom early before Prom King and Queen are announced. Matty goes back to prom but Jenna has already left. Jenna's Mom, Lacy persuades Jenna to return to prom. Sadie gets caught discarding alcohol bottles and gets banned from graduation. Matty and Jenna finally meet at the prom king and queen announcement, that neither win. After, Matty dances with Jenna and tells her he never stopped loving her.
76	11	"The Graduates"	Peter Lauer	Mike Chessler	November 9, 2015	0.78
Sadie is banned from attending Graduation and giving her Valedictorian speech after being busted for drinking at prom and causing a scene at the Graduation Day breakfast. Matty drops a bomb on Jenna when he reveals he has to leave for Berkeley after Graduation Night to start soccer practice over the summer, leaving the couple only one day left together. Before Jenna can respond, Valerie hijacks the graduation ceremony to announce it is now a 'Weduation' - a surprise wedding for herself and her boyfriend Biggie. Lacey ordains the wedding and Jenna is called on stage to be the flower girl.
77	12	"Holding On and Letting Go"	Peter Lauer	Chris Alberghini	November 9, 2015	0.74
Tamara and Jake realise they are both holding on to how they have defined themselves in high school and confront their fears that they will not be able to achieve such high social statuses in their post-graduate lives. Sergio and Sadie get back together. Jenna and Matty decide they love each other and want to continue the relationship over the summer.
Part 2
78	13	"I'm the Kind of Girl Who Found Her Voice in College"	Peter Lauer	Mike Chessler	March 15, 2016	0.52
79	14	"WTF Happened Last Year?"	Gail Lerner	Anna Christopher	March 22, 2016	0.58
Jenna reveals what happened to her and the rest of the gang in the last year--what caused the freeze between Matty and Jenna, what sparked the friendship between Sadie and Tamara, and how Jake and Lissa rekindled their romance.
80	15	"The Friend Connection"	Mike Chessler	Sarah Walker	March 29, 2016	0.48
Jenna refrains from a new relationship in order to connect with her co-workers; Tamara throws a chic birthday party for Sadie that leaves some party goers feeling less than celebratory.
81	16	"Best Friends For Never"	Mike Chessler	Ryan O'Connell	April 5, 2016	0.52
In an attempt to make Idea Bin a friendlier place for herself, Jenna hooks Tamara up with an internship but quickly finds that working with friends can be a recipe for disaster.
82	17	"Fireworks"	Jeff Melman	Allison M. Gibson	April 12, 2016	0.54
Jake gets Jenna and Tamara jobs at Palos hills country club. But everyone ends up getting fired when the group have a party.
83	18	"Digging Deep"	Steve Gainer	Leila Cohan-Miccio	April 19, 2016	0.59
The group throw a surprise party for Jake in an attempt to apologize for getting him fired and Ally gets him rehired. Jenna writes an article about her and Matty's relationship and after it gets posted it goes viral and Matty gets upset at her for revealing personal details about their relationship.
84	19	"Girls Gone Viral"	Beau Mirchoff	Story by : Ryan O'Connell; Teleplay by : Sarah Walker & Jenna Wycoff	April 26, 2016	0.55
Jenna attempts to get her article about Matty taken down. Jake sleeps with Jenna's co-worker Ophelia.
85	20	"Misadventures in Babysitting"	Anna Mastro	Jenna Lamia	May 3, 2016	0.70
Matty helps Jenna babysit. Tamara and Sadie attend a rich-kid clambake. Lissa discovers what it takes to be a Palos Hills mom.
86	21	"Living in Sin"	Chris Alberghini	Leila Cohan-Miccio	May 10, 2016	0.49
Tamara is in debt. Jenna and Luke get serious.
87	22	"Home Again, Home Again"	Chris Alberghini	Jenna Lamia	May 17, 2016	0.59
Jenna and Luke argue over an article she wrote for Ideabin about their relationship, which angers Lizzie due to Luke's dishonesty. Jenna signs up for her camp reunion, hoping to reconnect with Matty. During a game of "Truth or Truth," they share their feelings, but Matty acknowledges his timing has always been off. When Jenna does not answer Luke's calls, Matty tells him where she is, leading to Luke's apology. He also reveals that he emailed the Dean of SCU about Jenna’s articles, which has piqued their interest in her transferring. Jenna and Luke reconcile, thanking Matty for his help. Meanwhile, Sadie fails to apologize to Tamara, damaging her relationships with Lissa and Sergio. Jake assists Lissa with a YouTube video and discusses his future beyond the club. Tamara meets Adam, who confronts her about lying to boyfriends, prompting her to leave a voicemail for Patrick.
88	23	"Second Chances"	Peter Lauer	Chris Alberghini	May 24, 2016	0.47
Jenna faces a dilemma in her dating life when Luke makes plans for her future without consulting her. Tamara has a hard time facing the truth of her personal failings.
89	24	"Happy Campers. Happier Trails"	Peter Lauer	Chris Alberghini & Mike Chessler	May 24, 2016	0.38
Camp Pookah is closing forever, Jenna has to choose between an important event at SCU and the camp reunion. Sadie is recovering from her car crash, with Valerie help. Lissa gets an offer from a Christian organization to buy her exercise program but refuses. Sadie apologies to all her friends and reconciles with Sergio. Jake turns down a promotion at the Palos Hill country club and decides to move to New York. Jenna and Matty end up back in the closet where her story began, but this time Matty tells her to not choose him or Luke but to "choose herself" and that they always find a way back to each other. It ends will all the friends and family around the camp fire together.

== Ratings ==
Awkward : U.S. viewers per episode (millions)

Season	Episode number																							
Season	1	2	3	4	5	6	7	8	9	10	11	12	13	14	15	16	17	18	19	20	21	22	23	24
1	1.72	1.43	1.62	1.94	1.88	2.36	1.99	2.08	2.28	2.11	2.24	2.24	–											
2	2.15	1.76	1.72	1.58	1.79	1.82	1.82	1.95	2.19	1.74	1.78	2.17	–											
3	2.14	2.14	1.34	1.38	1.38	1.12	1.17	1.35	0.99	1.22	1.56	1.21	1.02	1.09	1.06	1.06	1.05	1.13	1.03	1.30	–			
4	1.63	1.25	1.02	1.21	1.08	1.04	1.19	1.20	1.05	1.13	1.22	1.22	1.25	0.95	0.93	1.02	0.82	0.82	1.27	0.91	1.04	–		
5	1.29	0.68	0.76	0.53	0.75	0.58	0.50	0.71	0.63	0.81	0.78	0.74	0.52	0.58	0.48	0.52	0.54	0.59	0.55	0.70	0.49	0.59	0.47	0.38

Audience measurement performed by Nielsen Media Research
