= Critics' Choice Television Award for Best Actress in a Comedy Series =

Critics' Choice Television Awards category

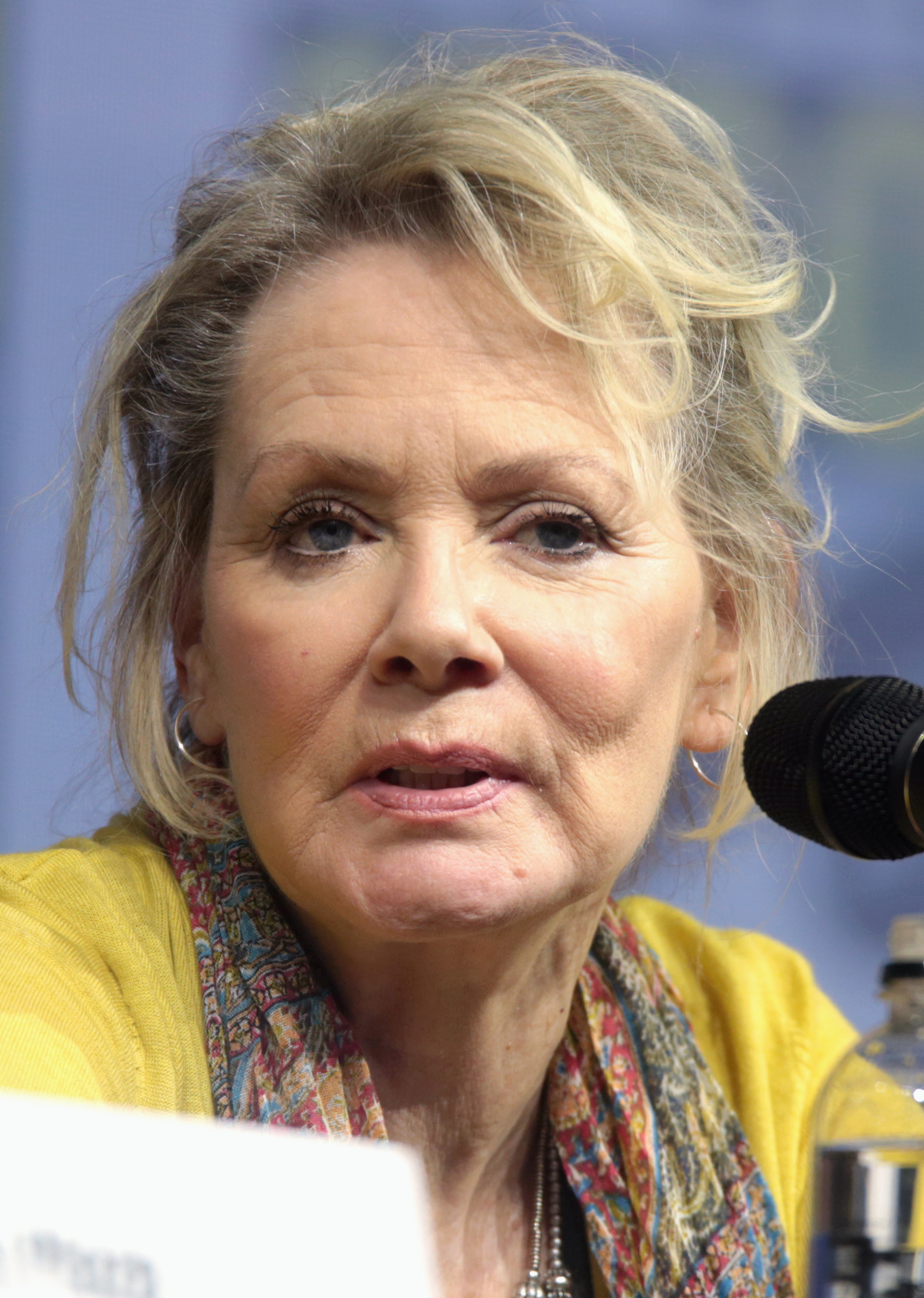
- The 2025 recipient: Jean Smart
- Country: United States
- Presented by: Critics Choice Association
- First award: 2011
- Currently held by: Jean Smart – Hacks (2026)
- Website: criticschoice.com

The Critics' Choice Television Award for Best Actress in a Comedy Series is one of the award categories presented annually by the Critics' Choice Television Awards (BTJA) to recognize the work done by television actresses.

The award was introduced in 2011, when the event was first initiated. The winners are selected by a group of television critics that are part of the Broadcast Television Critics Association.

The current winner in this category is Jean Smart for Hacks (2026). Smart holds the record with most wins in this category with four. Julia Louis-Dreyfus holds the record for most nominations with six for her work in Veep.

== Winners and nominees ==
indicates the winner

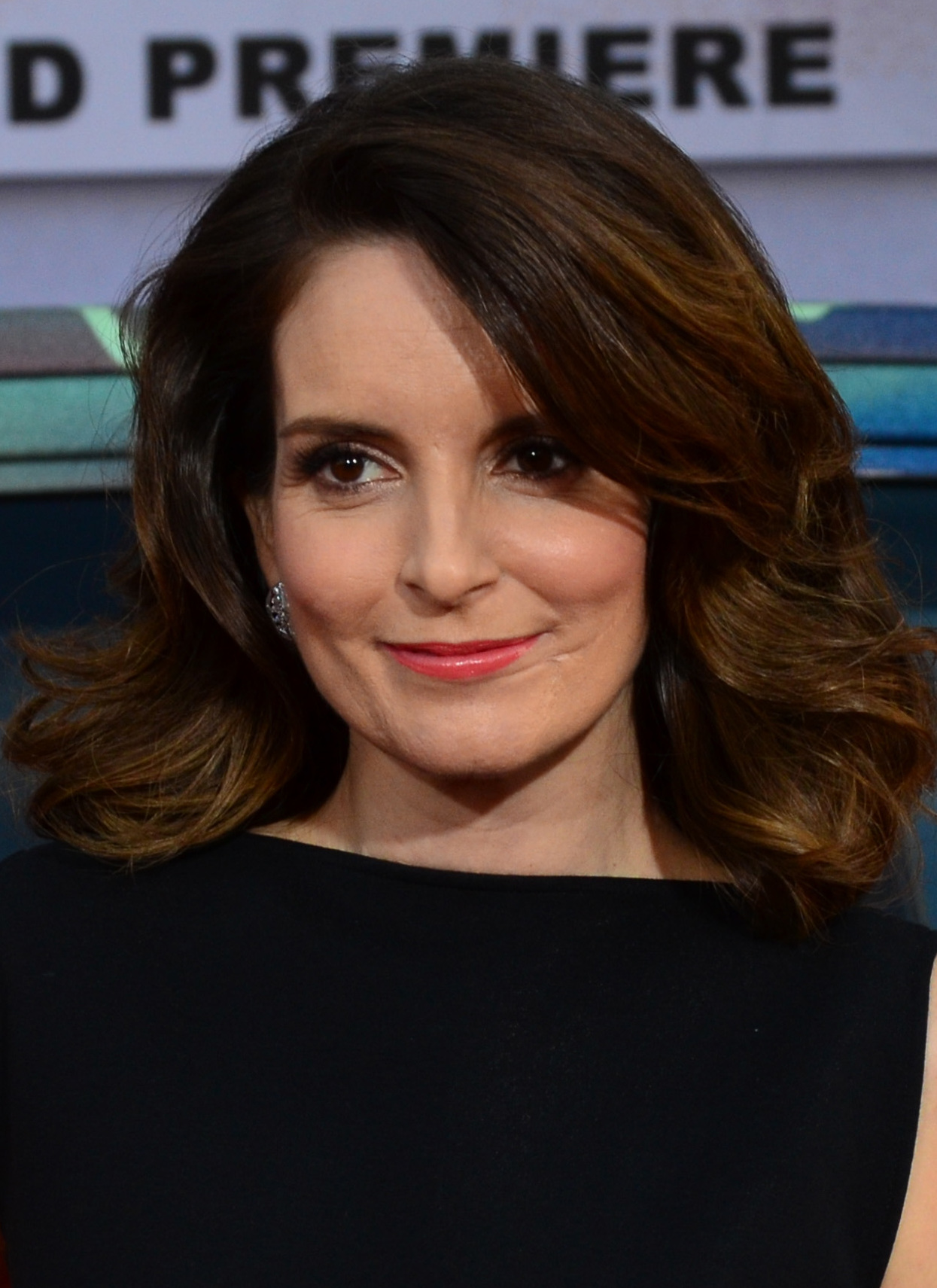
Tina Fey won for 30 Rock (2011)

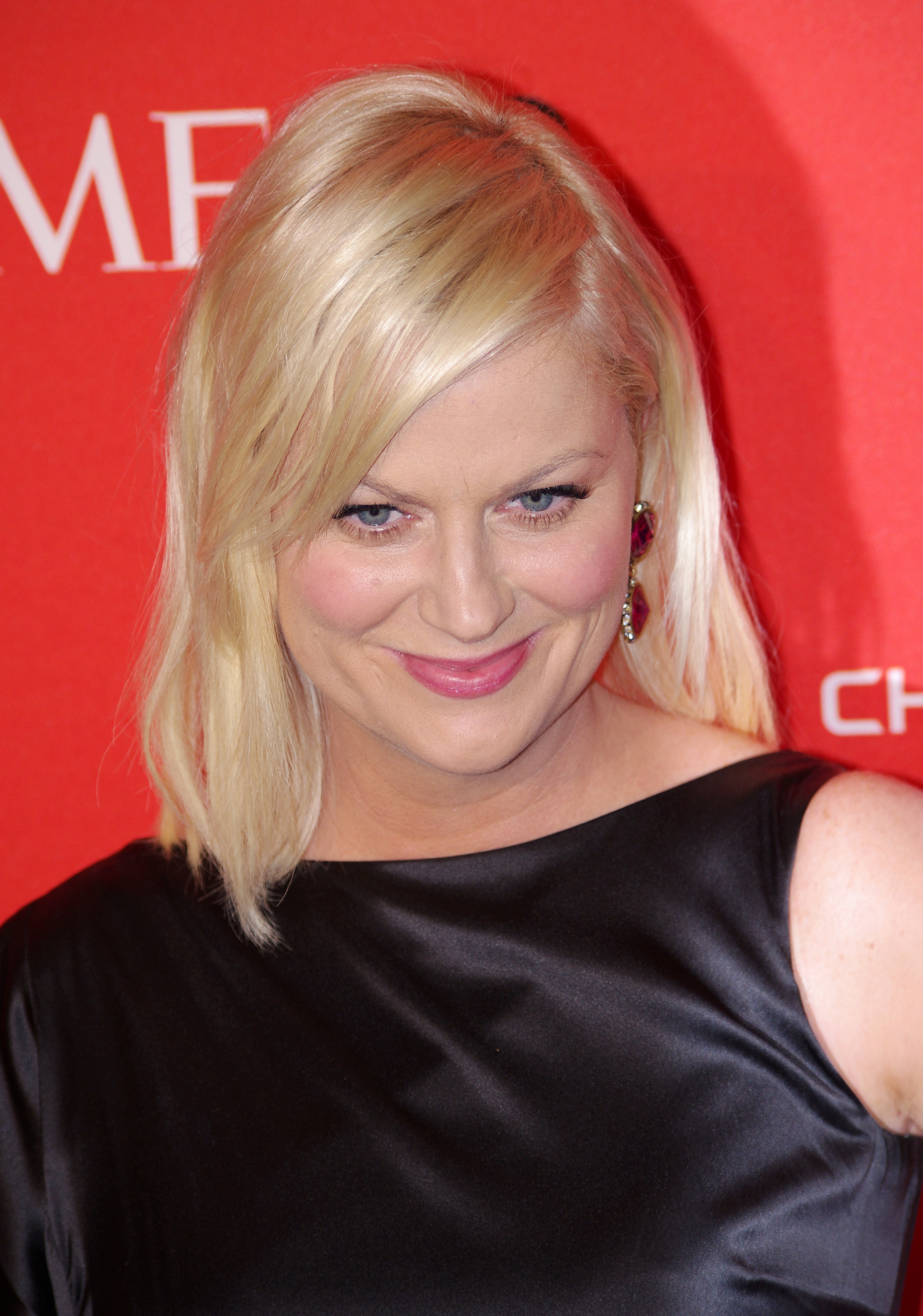
Amy Poehler won for Parks and Recreation (2012)

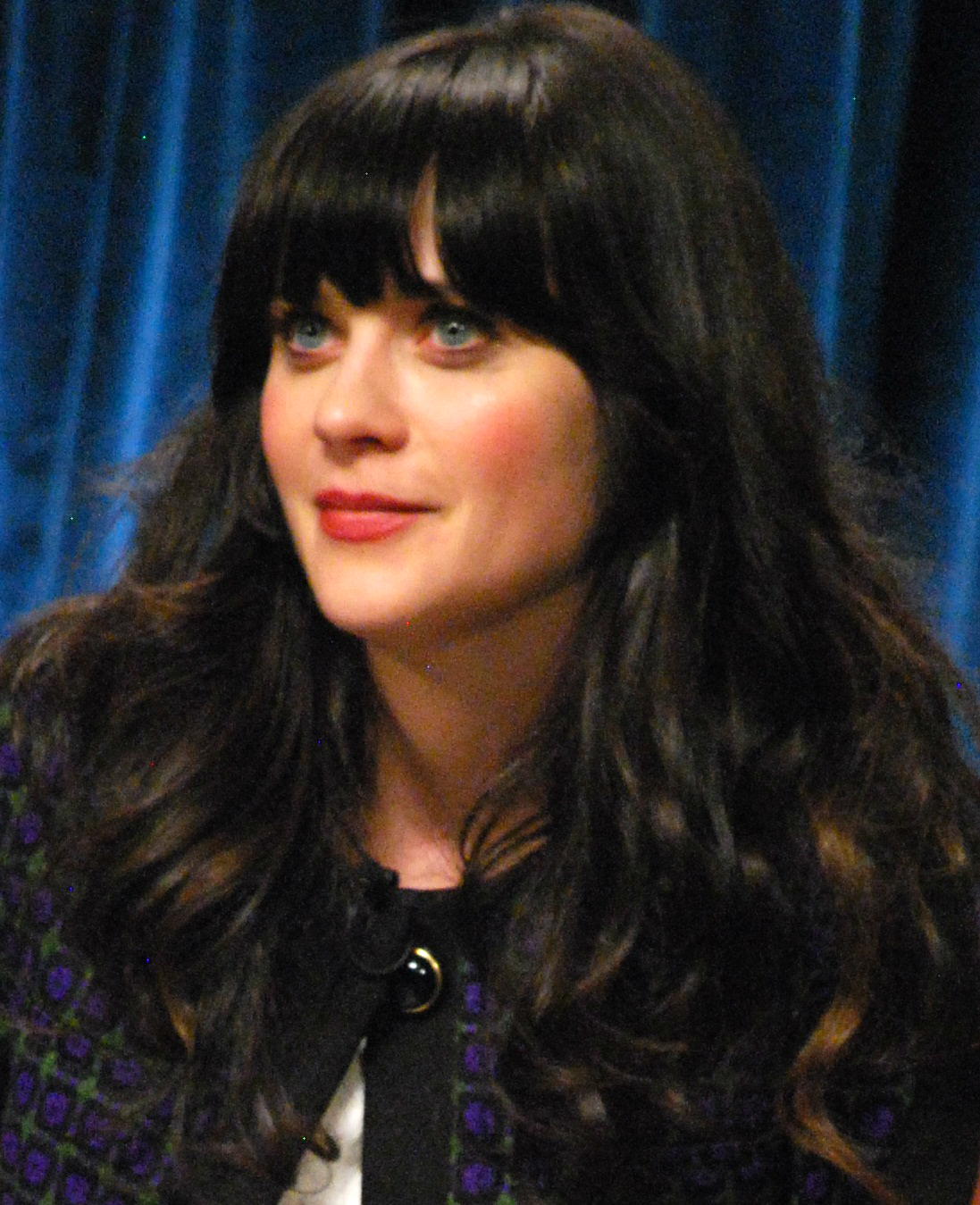
Zooey Deschanel won for New Girl (2012)

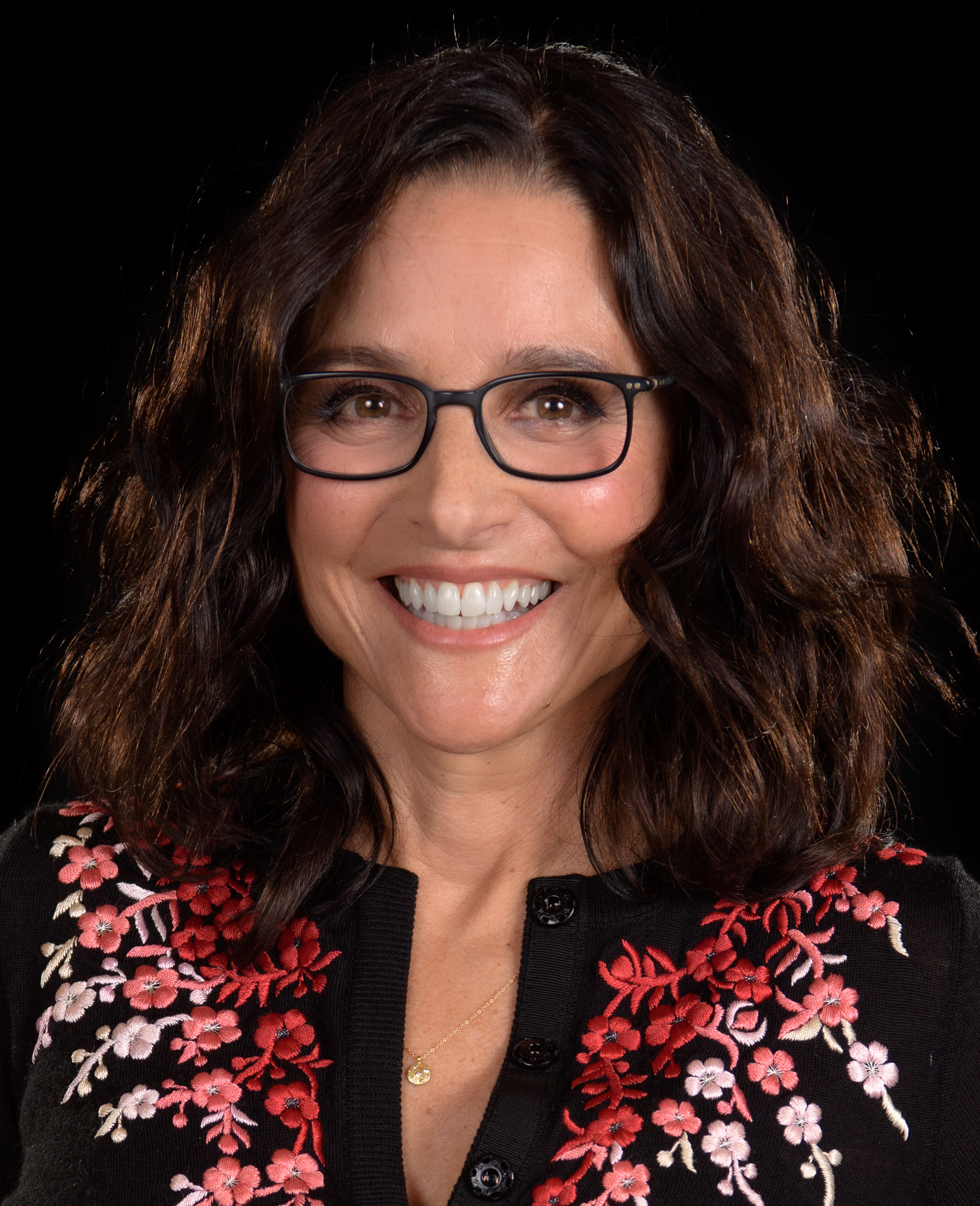
Julia Louis-Dreyfus won twice consecutively for Veep (2013, 2014)

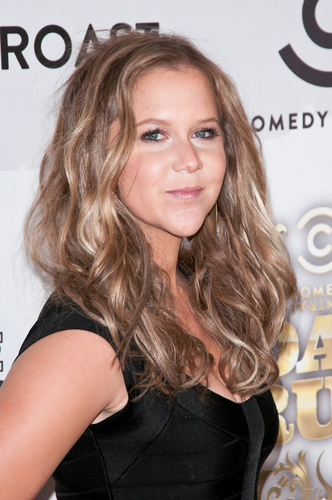
Amy Schumer won for Inside Amy Schumer (2015)

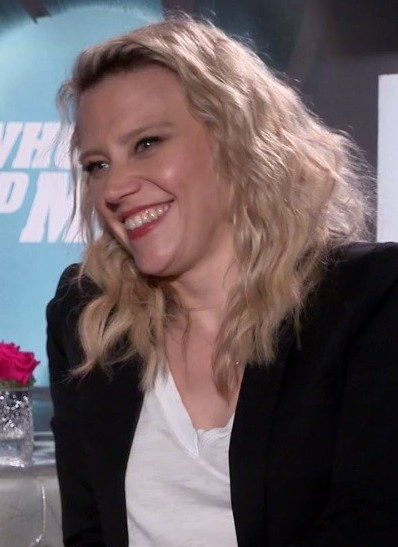
Kate McKinnon won for Saturday Night Live (2016)

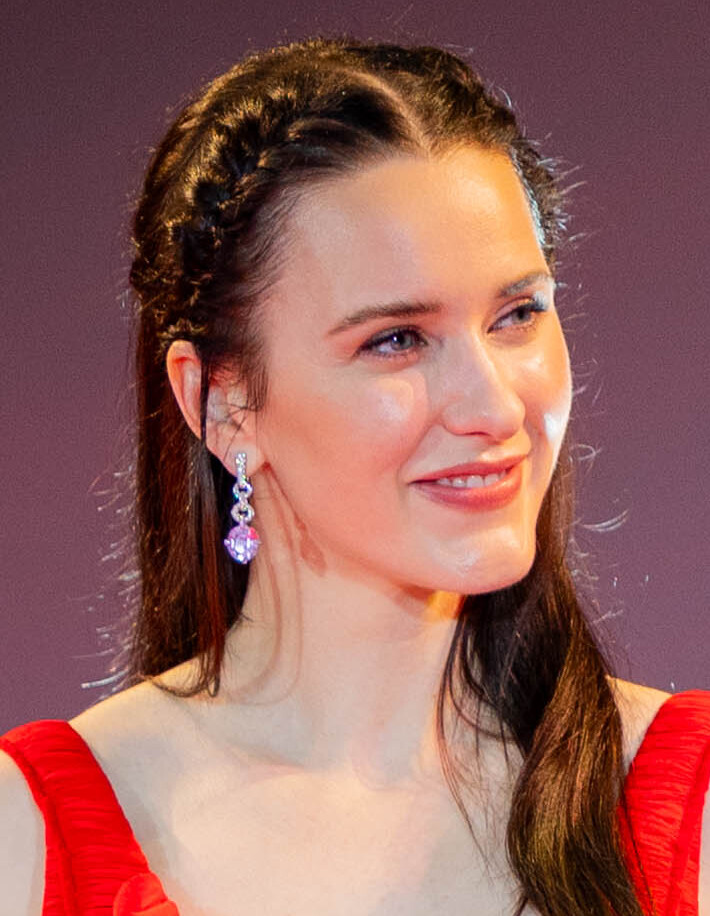
Rachel Brosnahan won twice consecutively for The Marvelous Mrs. Maisel (2018, 2019)

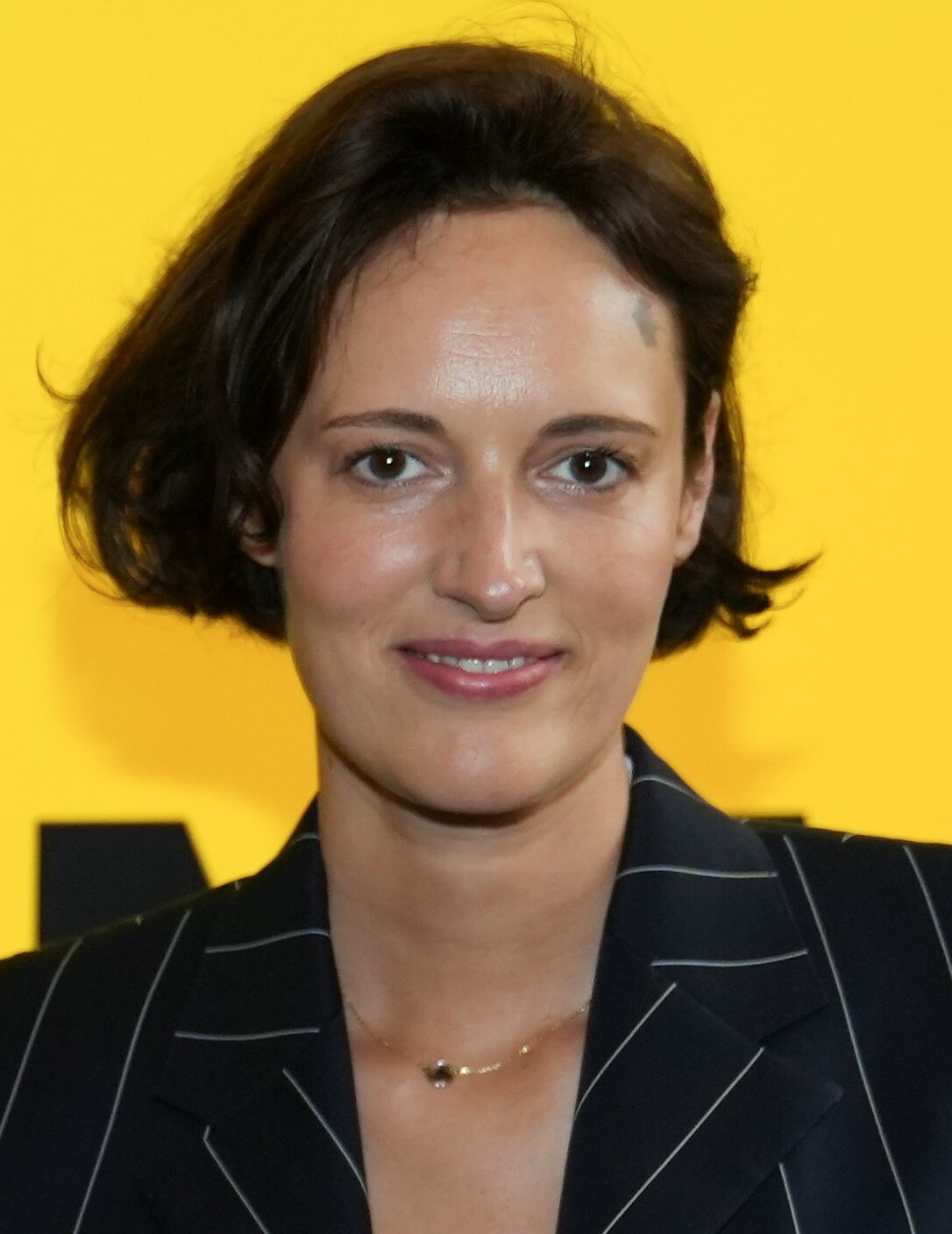
Phoebe Waller-Bridge won for Fleabag (2020)

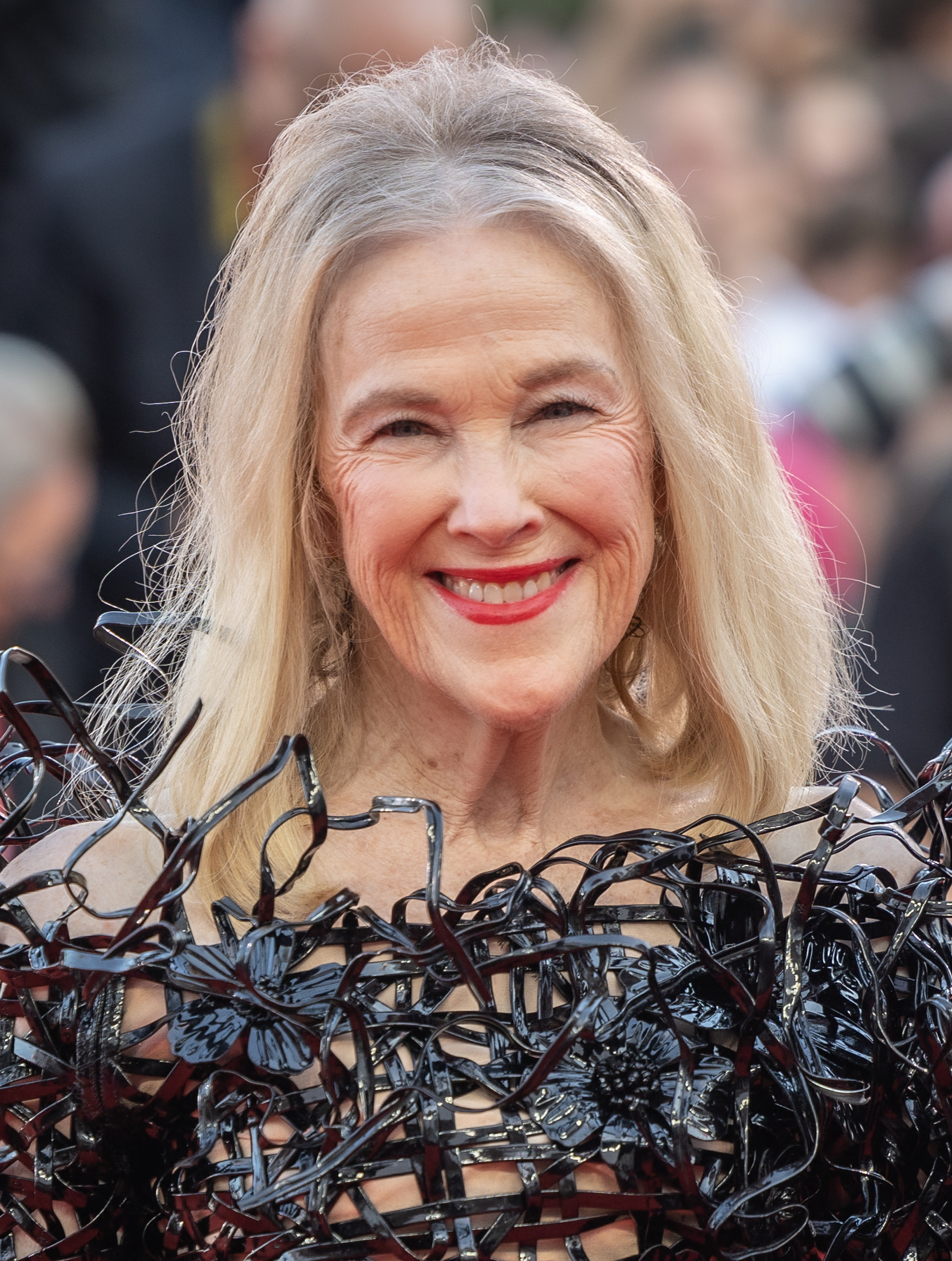
Catherine O'Hara won for Schitt's Creek (2021)

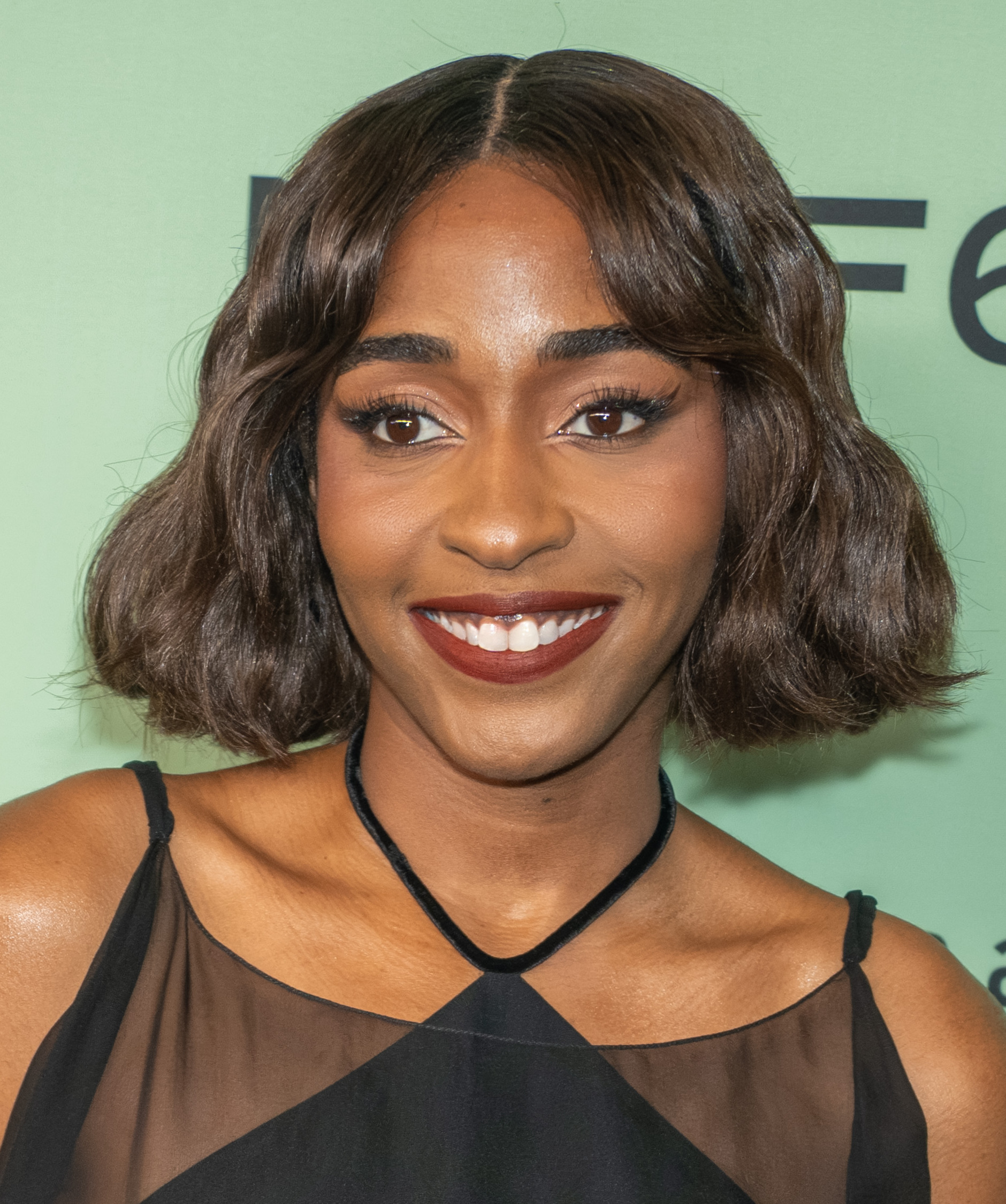
Ayo Edebiri won for The Bear (2024)

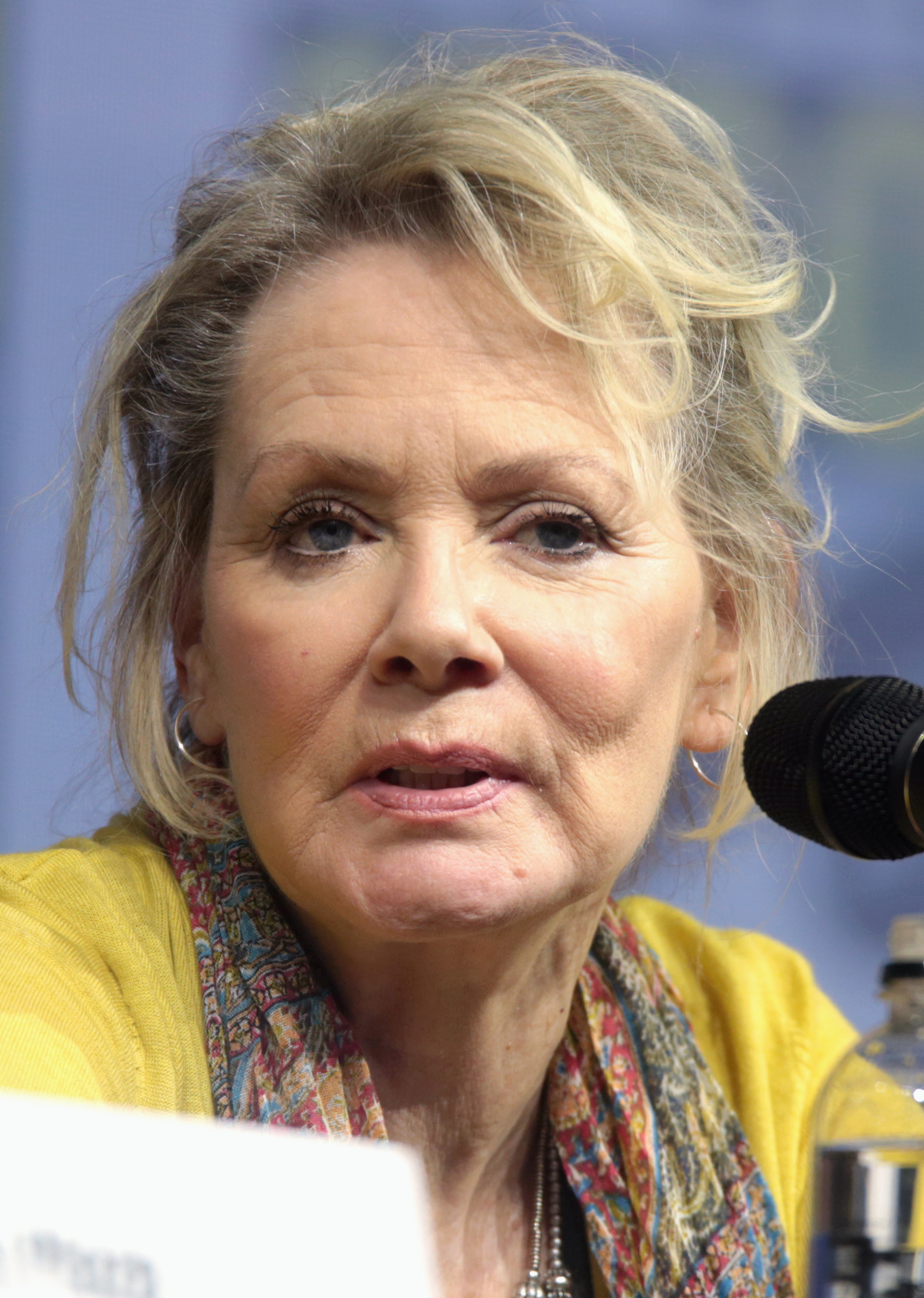
Jean Smart won four times, twice consecutively for Hacks (2022–23, 2025–2026)

=== 2010s ===
Year	Actor	Program	Role	Network
2011	Tina Fey	30 Rock	Liz Lemon	NBC
2011	Courteney Cox	Cougar Town	Jules Cobb	ABC
2011	Edie Falco	Nurse Jackie	Jackie Peyton	Showtime
2011	Patricia Heaton	The Middle	Frankie Heck	ABC
2011	Martha Plimpton	Raising Hope	Virginia Chance	Fox
2011	Amy Poehler	Parks and Recreation	Leslie Knope	NBC
2012	Zooey Deschanel	New Girl	Jessica Day	Fox
2012	Amy Poehler	Parks and Recreation	Leslie Knope	NBC
2012	Lena Dunham	Girls	Hannah Horvath	HBO
2012	Julia Louis-Dreyfus	Veep	Selina Meyer	HBO
2012	Martha Plimpton	Raising Hope	Virginia Chance	Fox
2012	Ashley Rickards	Awkward	Jenna Hamilton	MTV
2013	Julia Louis-Dreyfus	Veep	Selina Meyer	HBO
2013	Laura Dern	Enlightened	Amy Jellicoe	HBO
2013	Zooey Deschanel	New Girl	Jessica Day	Fox
2013	Lena Dunham	Girls	Hannah Horvath	HBO
2013	Sutton Foster	Bunheads	Michelle Simms Flowers	ABC Family
2013	Amy Poehler	Parks and Recreation	Leslie Knope	NBC
2014	Julia Louis-Dreyfus	Veep	Selina Meyer	HBO
2014	Ilana Glazer	Broad City	Ilana Wexler	Comedy Central
2014	Wendi McLendon-Covey	The Goldbergs	Beverly Goldberg	ABC
2014	Amy Poehler	Parks and Recreation	Leslie Knope	NBC
2014	Emmy Rossum	Shameless	Fiona Gallagher	Showtime
2014	Amy Schumer	Inside Amy Schumer	Various Characters	Comedy Central
2015	Amy Schumer	Inside Amy Schumer	Various Characters	Comedy Central
2015	Ilana Glazer	Broad City	Ilana Wexler	Comedy Central
2015	Lisa Kudrow	The Comeback	Valerie Cherish	HBO
2015	Julia Louis-Dreyfus	Veep	Selina Meyer	HBO
2015	Gina Rodriguez	Jane the Virgin	Jane Gloriana Villanueva	The CW
2015	Constance Wu	Fresh Off the Boat	Jessica Huang	ABC
2016 (1)	Rachel Bloom	Crazy Ex-Girlfriend	Rebecca Nora Bunch	The CW
2016 (1)	Aya Cash	You're the Worst	Gretchen Cutler	FXX
2016 (1)	Wendi McLendon-Covey	The Goldbergs	Beverly Goldberg	ABC
2016 (1)	Gina Rodriguez	Jane the Virgin	Jane Gloriana Villanueva	The CW
2016 (1)	Tracee Ellis Ross	Black-ish	Rainbow "Bow" Johnson	ABC
2016 (1)	Constance Wu	Fresh Off the Boat	Jessica Huang	ABC
2016 (2)	Kate McKinnon	Saturday Night Live	Various Characters	NBC
2016 (2)	Ellie Kemper	Unbreakable Kimmy Schmidt	Kimmy Schmidt	Netflix
2016 (2)	Julia Louis-Dreyfus	Veep	Selina Meyer	HBO
2016 (2)	Tracee Ellis Ross	Black-ish	Rainbow "Bow" Johnson	ABC
2016 (2)	Phoebe Waller-Bridge	Fleabag	Fleabag	Amazon Prime Video
2016 (2)	Constance Wu	Fresh Off the Boat	Jessica Huang	ABC
2018	Rachel Brosnahan	The Marvelous Mrs. Maisel	Miriam "Midge" Maisel	Amazon Prime Video
2018	Kristen Bell	The Good Place	Eleanor Shellstrop	NBC
2018	Alison Brie	GLOW	Ruth "Zoya the Destroya" Wilder	Netflix
2018	Sutton Foster	Younger	Liza Miller	TV Land
2018	Ellie Kemper	Unbreakable Kimmy Schmidt	Kimmy Schmidt	Netflix
2018	Constance Wu	Fresh Off the Boat	Jessica Huang	ABC
2019	Rachel Brosnahan	The Marvelous Mrs. Maisel	Miriam "Midge" Maisel	Amazon Prime Video
2019	Rachel Bloom	Crazy Ex-Girlfriend	Rebecca Bunch	The CW
2019	Allison Janney	Mom	Bonnie Plunkett	CBS
2019	Justina Machado	One Day at a Time	Penelope Alvarez	Netflix
2019	Debra Messing	Will & Grace	Grace Adler	NBC
2019	Issa Rae	Insecure	Issa Dee	HBO

=== 2020s ===
Year	Actor	Role	Program	Network
2020	Phoebe Waller-Bridge	Fleabag	Fleabag	Amazon Prime Video
2020	Christina Applegate	Dead to Me	Jen Harding	Netflix
2020	Alison Brie	GLOW	Ruth "Zoya the Destroya" Wilder	Netflix
2020	Rachel Brosnahan	The Marvelous Mrs. Maisel	Miriam "Midge" Maisel	Amazon Prime Video
2020	Kirsten Dunst	On Becoming a God in Central Florida	Krystal Stubbs	Showtime
2020	Julia Louis-Dreyfus	Veep	Selina Meyer	HBO
2020	Catherine O'Hara	Schitt's Creek	Moira Rose	Pop
2021	Catherine O'Hara	Schitt's Creek	Moira Rose	Pop
2021	Pamela Adlon	Better Things	Sam Fox	FX
2021	Christina Applegate	Dead to Me	Jen Harding	Netflix
2021	Kaley Cuoco	The Flight Attendant	Cassie Bowden	HBO Max
2021	Natasia Demetriou	What We Do in the Shadows	Nadja	FX
2021	Issa Rae	Insecure	Issa Dee	HBO
2022	Jean Smart	Hacks	Deborah Vance	HBO Max
2022	Elle Fanning	The Great	Catherine the Great	Hulu
2022	Renée Elise Goldsberry	Girls5eva	Wickie	Peacock
2022	Selena Gomez	Only Murders in the Building	Mabel Mora	Hulu
2022	Sandra Oh	The Chair	Dr. Ji-Yoon Kim	Netflix
2022	Issa Rae	Insecure	Issa Dee	HBO
2023	Jean Smart	Hacks	Deborah Vance	HBO Max
2023	Christina Applegate	Dead to Me	Jen Harding	Netflix
2023	Quinta Brunson	Abbott Elementary	Janine Teagues	ABC
2023	Kaley Cuoco	The Flight Attendant	Cassie Bowden	HBO Max
2023	Renée Elise Goldsberry	Girls5eva	Wickie	Peacock
2023	Devery Jacobs	Reservation Dogs	Elora Danan Postoak	FX
2024	Ayo Edebiri	The Bear	Sydney Adamu	FX
2024	Rachel Brosnahan	The Marvelous Mrs. Maisel	Miriam "Midge" Maisel	Prime Video
2024	Quinta Brunson	Abbott Elementary	Janine Teagues	ABC
2024	Bridget Everett	Somebody Somewhere	Sam	HBO Max
2024	Devery Jacobs	Reservation Dogs	Elora Danan Postoak	FX
2024	Natasha Lyonne	Poker Face	Charlie Cale	Peacock
2025
2025	Jean Smart	Hacks	Deborah Vance	HBO Max
2025	Kristen Bell	Nobody Wants This	Joanne	Netflix
2025	Quinta Brunson	Abbott Elementary	Janine Teagues	ABC
2025	Natasia Demetriou	What We Do in the Shadows	Nadja	FX
2025	Bridget Everett	Somebody Somewhere	Sam	HBO
2025	Kristen Wiig	Palm Royale	Maxine Dellacorte-Simmons	Apple TV+
2026
2026	Jean Smart	Hacks	Deborah Vance	HBO Max
2026	Kristen Bell	Nobody Wants This	Joanne	Netflix
2026	Natasha Lyonne	Poker Face	Charlie Cale	Peacock
2026	Rose McIver	Ghosts	Samantha "Sam" Arondekar	CBS
2026	Edi Patterson	The Righteous Gemstones	Judy Gemstone	HBO Max
2026	Carrie Preston	Elsbeth	Elsbeth Tascioni	CBS

== Multiple wins and nominations ==
=== Multiple wins ===
4 wins

- Jean Smart (2 consecutive twice)

2 wins

- Rachel Brosnahan (consecutive)
- Julia Louis-Dreyfus (consecutive)

=== Multiple nominations ===
6 nominations

- Julia Louis-Dreyfus

4 nominations

- Rachel Brosnahan
- Amy Poehler
- Jean Smart
- Constance Wu

3 nominations

- Christina Applegate
- Kristen Bell
- Quinta Brunson
- Issa Rae

2 nominations

- Rachel Bloom
- Alison Brie
- Kaley Cuoco
- Natasia Demetriou
- Zooey Deschanel
- Lena Dunham
- Bridget Everett
- Sutton Foster
- Ilana Glazer
- Renée Elise Goldsberry
- Devery Jacobs
- Allison Janney
- Ellie Kemper
- Natasha Lyonne
- Wendi McLendon-Covey
- Catherine O'Hara
- Martha Plimpton
- Gina Rodriguez
- Tracee Ellis Ross
- Amy Schumer
- Phoebe Waller-Bridge

== See also ==
- TCA Award for Individual Achievement in Comedy
- Primetime Emmy Award for Outstanding Lead Actress in a Comedy Series
- Golden Globe Award for Best Actress – Television Series Musical or Comedy
- Screen Actors Guild Award for Outstanding Performance by a Female Actor in a Comedy Series
