= So Notorious =

2006 American television series

- Also known as: So NoTORIous
- Genre: Sitcom
- Created by: Chris Alberghini; Mike Chessler; Tori Spelling
- Written by: Chris Alberghini; Sharon Bordas; Mike Chessler; Damon Hill
- Directed by: Chris Alberghini; Mike Chessler; Rusty Cundieff; Jim Fall; Peter Lauer
- Starring: Tori Spelling
- Country of origin: United States
- Original language: English
- No. of seasons: 1
- No. of episodes: 10

Production
- Executive producers: Chris Alberghini; Mike Chessler; Tori Spelling
- Producers: Erin O'Malley; Shawn Wilt
- Production locations: Los Angeles, California
- Running time: 30 minutes

Original release
- Network: VH1
- Release: April 2 – May 14, 2006

So Notorious, sometimes stylized So NoTORIous, is an American sitcom starring — and loosely based on the life of — actress Tori Spelling. The series debuted on VH1 on April 2, 2006, and despite lasting only ten episodes, received positive reviews from critics.

== Premise ==
The series follows the actress as she tries to downplay the fact that she is the daughter of Aaron Spelling (his name is rarely mentioned in series; he is referred to by Tori as "Daddy" and taking a cue from Charlie's Angels is only heard off-camera). Despite the fact that her father is very wealthy, Tori tries to prove that she just wants people to like her for herself and take her seriously.

Along with Tori the show features her close friends Pete (James Carpinello), a roommate who shares Tori's condo and has a habit of bringing women to the place every night by bragging about Tori being his roommate; Janey (Brennan Hesser), a real estate agent with a habit for being nosy and ambitious; and Sasan (Zachary Quinto), an openly bisexual (except to his parents) Iranian-American who tends to be critical at times, hoping it will knock a little sense into Tori. She is also seen carrying around her overweight pug Mimi LaRue, who is frequently dressed in tacky designer clothes.

In addition, Tori also has to deal with her self-absorbed mother Candy "KiKi" Spelling, whose history of how Tori was raised and why she treats her daughter as if she doesn't exist may explain why Tori acts like she does; Margaret (Cleo King), the nanny who raised Tori and is more motherly to her than KiKi; and Ruthie Rose, her frenetic, doting, and not-so-reliable manager.

== Cast ==
- Tori Spelling (Herself)
- Loni Anderson (KiKi Spelling)
- James Carpinello (Pete)
- Brennan Hesser (Janey)
- Zachary Quinto (Sasan)
- Jeannetta Arnette (Ruthie Rose)
- Cleo King (Nanny)
- Joanna Sanchez (Vilma)
- Natalia Nogulich (Touca)
- Brian George (Omid)
- Ariel Winter (Little Tori)

== Episodes ==
No.	Title	Directed by	Written by	Original release date
1	"Plucky"	Peter Lauer	Unknown	April 2, 2006
Tori crushes on a gaffer named Scott (Joe Manganiello) on the set of her latest made-for-TV movie. She throws a party at her condo as a way to get to know Scott off-set, but the perfectly planned event goes awry when Pete invites a pair of potential one-night-stands, next-door neighbor Farrah Fawcett asks for a baked potato and Sasan's mother arrives wearing something of Tori's that KiKi sold on eBay.
2	"Whole"	Christopher Leitch	Mike Chessler & Chris Alberghini	April 2, 2006
Tori's first date with Scott at The Improv becomes a nightmare when the headlining comedian Lisa Lampanelli pokes fun at Tori after seeing a tabloid picture of her taken earlier in the week. Scott later reveals that he has joined a Scientology-esque denomination called "Wholeness" and encourages Tori and her friends to check it out.
3	"Street"	Jim Fall	Sharon Bordas & Damon Hill & Jessica Kaminsky	April 9, 2006
Desperate for a role in an upcoming drama about a prostitute, Tori goes to the Pleasure Chest sex shop to buy sexy clothes and props for a self-made audition tape. She escapes the store to avoid a former TV co-star but loses her Blackberry in the process. Now someone has it and is using it to taunt Tori, resulting in an all-night hunt to track down the phone-stalker.
4	"Accommodating"	Jim Fall	Unknown	April 16, 2006
Tori is annoyed by the constant disrespect she gets from roommate Pete's new girlfriend, but Tori is too threatened by confrontation to talk to Pete about it and instead tries to find other places to stay.
5	"Jealous"	Chris Alberghini	Unknown	April 23, 2006
Tori starts dating a plastic surgeon named Carter, but KiKi starts spending a lot of time with him.
6	"Cursed"	Mike Chessler	Mike Chessler & Chris Alberghini	April 23, 2006
After a streak of what seems to be bad luck, Tori goes to a Santería priestess named Mama Belle (Whoopi Goldberg).
7	"Relaxed"	Mike Chessler	Sharon Bordas & Damon Hill	April 30, 2006
After getting into an argument with her friends, Tori runs into Farrah Fawcett's masseur Howard (Michael James Reed), who suggests that she buy them massages to patch things up — but Howard's gossipy ways only make things worse.
8	"Charitable"	Charles Herman-Wurmfeld	Mike Chessler & Chris Alberghini	May 7, 2006
Tori becomes the mentor of a teenage girl named Tina (Emma Bates), who soon convinces Tori and KiKi to throw her a quinceañera at the mansion, with surprising results.
9	"Soulful"	Rusty Cundieff	Unknown	May 14, 2006
Tori's plans to spend Mother's Day with Nan at her church are impacted when KiKi comes along after her cruise to Mexico is cut short.
10	"Canadian"	Unknown	Unknown	June 1, 2006
Fed up with fashion sizes that do not fit Mimi LaRue, Tori decides to launch a dog clothing line with assistance from Sasan. But when she gets a role in a low-budget Canadian film she takes Sasan and Pete along, hoping to work on the venture with Sasan during the trip, but the complicated shoot makes this impossible. This episode aired on LOGO rather than VH1. It is not available for purchase on iTunes or Amazon Video but is included as an additional feature on the DVD release So NoTORIous: The Complete Series.

== Critical response ==
The show received positive notices from critics. The New York Post said that the show was a "very witty, sometimes brilliantly insightful hybrid sitcom".

The Hollywood Reporter called the show "considerably more ambitious than a lot of other sitcoms" and said that "It's easy to dismiss this as another attempt by Spelling to prove that her talent goes beyond her last name, but there's more to it than that. She creates an appealing character despite all the preconceptions, many of which are acknowledged and dispensed with in the first few scenes." The Los Angeles Times conceded that "while this sort of thing has been done before – it has been done here exceedingly well." The Chicago Tribune began their review with "there are people in the world who'll never watch anything that stars Tori Spelling. Their loss." The review went on to praise the show; admitting that "Spelling’s surprisingly good VH1 series, is a not-at-all-guilty pleasure. It has more than its share of amusing moments, and it also has a surprising amount of heart." The Detroit Free Press called the show "a sassy, classy winner".

The show was nominated for Outstanding Comedy Series at the 2007 GLAAD Media Awards.

== Additional information ==
Created by Chris Alberghini, Mike Chessler and Tori Spelling, the series was produced by NBC Universal Television. It was originally intended for the NBC network, but when they passed on the completed pilot episode the producers sought another outlet and eventually landed a deal with VH1. Paramount Home Entertainment issued the November 21, 2006 DVD release So NoTORIous: The Complete Series.

Although the first nine episodes aired on VH1, the "Canadian" episode was broadcast on its sister network LOGO on June 1, 2006. This episode is not available for purchase on iTunes or Amazon Video, but is included as an additional feature on the 2006 DVD release.
