= Jonny Zero =

Television program

- Genre: Action; Crime drama
- Created by: R. Scott Gemmill; Ken Sanzel
- Starring: Franky G; GQ; Brennan Hesser
- Theme music composer: Ed Cortas; Antonio Pinto
- Composer: John McCarthy
- Country of origin: United States
- Original language: English
- No. of series: 1
- No. of episodes: 13

Production
- Executive producers: John Wells; Llewellyn Wells; R. Scott Gemmill; Mimi Leder
- Producer: Andrew Stearn
- Production location: New York City
- Cinematography: Michael Grady; Craig DiBona
- Editors: Randy Jon Morgan; Martin Nicholson; Stan Salfas
- Running time: 42 minutes
- Production companies: John Wells Productions; Warner Bros. Television

Original release
- Network: Fox
- Release: January 14 – March 4, 2005

Jonny Zero is an American television action-crime drama series, created and written by R. Scott Gemmill and executive produced by John Wells, that premiered on Fox on January 14, 2005. The series principally stars Franky G as Jonny Calvo, an ex-con approached to be an FBI informant following his imprisonment for murder. The series co-stars GQ and Brennan Hesser.

A single season of thirteen episodes were produced, but Fox aired only eight of the thirteen episodes, choosing to cancel the series due to low ratings after initially choosing to broadcast it in the Friday night death slot. During the show's run, episodes were aired out of order, causing numerous continuity errors, including Jonny's best friend being murdered, but then turning up two episodes later alive and well, introduced as a new character. The series was broadcast in its entirety in Australia on ABC in 2007.

== Plot ==
Jonny Calvo (Franky G) served four years in Sing-Sing Prison for killing a man. After release, he is determined to stay out of the criminal life; however his old boss, Garrett (Ritchie Coster), tries to lure him back to crime. FBI Agent Stringer (Chris Bauer) wants Jonny to be his informant so he can arrest Garrett on numerous criminal charges. Upon his release from prison, Jonny tries to prove to his ex-wife and son that he is reliable, but his past catches up with him, causing him to have minimal contact with them. His parole officer, Gloria (Aunjanue Ellis), orders Jonny to find a job upon his release and soon Jonny ends up mopping floors at Captain Jack's, a pirate-themed restaurant for children. He soon meets another employee who calls himself, Random (GQ).

The two soon become friends and Jonny decides that he will use his street smarts to help other people in need by starting his own private eye business. Random follows suit and allows Jonny to stay at his apartment. However, being a small private business, the money from clients is minimal and Jonny reluctantly decides to work for Garrett again, but making sure that crime will play no part in getting him thrown back in prison. Jonny is soon sought after by a father looking for his daughter, Danni a.k.a. "Velvet" (Brennan Hesser) who works at strip joints and goth clubs. After much complications, she stops working at clubs and forms a friendship with Jonny and Random. The series concentrates on Jonny trying to redeem himself by helping other people in need, staying away from crime and proving to his ex-wife and son that he has changed.

== Cast ==
=== Main ===
- Franky G as Jonny Calvo
- GQ as Random
- Brennan Hesser as Danielle Stiles

=== Recurring ===
- Sean Moran as Vincent Calvo
- Ritchie Coster as Garrett
- Anthony Desio as Tull
- Samuel E. Wright as Jericho
- Chris Bauer as Agent Stringer
- Tawny Cypress as Nina Calvo
- Aunjanue Ellis as Gloria
- Susan Misner as Eve
- R.E. Rodgers as Niko
- Duke Valenti as Todd

== Episodes ==
Episodes are listed in original production order.

No.	Title	Directed by	Written by	Original release date	Prod. code
1	"Pilot"	Mimi Leder	Story by : Ken Sanzel & R. Scott Gemmill; Teleplay by : R. Scott Gemmill	January 14, 2005	2T5801
Jonny Calvo did four years for killing a man. Now he's out but without a job or a place to live. His parole officer, Gloria, orders him to get a job but his new job consists of mopping floors at Captain Jack's restaurant, a pirate themed children's restaurant. He meets another employee by the name of Random and the two become good friends. Jonny decides he will use his street skills to help other people who need it and starts a private eye business. One night he befriends a man, Martin Styles, who is looking for his runaway daughter, Danni. Jonny agrees to help this man find his daughter, but when he goes to report back to Styles, he finds him being assaulted by a thug. Subsequently, Danni is kidnapped and it is up to Jonny to find her and pass on her father's dying wish. Meanwhile, Special Agent Stringer informs Jonny that he has walked into the middle of a Mob war.
2	"Who's Your Daddy?"	Mimi Leder	R. Scott Gemmill	February 4, 2005	2T5802
One of Velvet's friend baby has been stolen. Jonny goes to steal it back but turns out to be the wrong baby. Jonny also uncovers a black-market baby ring.
3	"Man Up"	Charles Haid	R. Scott Gemmill	April 9, 2007 (Australia)	2T5803
As Jonny tries to get his life back to normal, he visits his son and gets a legitimate job at a gym. Meanwhile, Random and Velvet are hired to work at a bar mitzvah, where a gang steal everybody's belongings. The boy having the bar mitzvah, Seth, asks for Jonny's help to retrieve the stolen goods.
4	"I Did It All for the Nooky"	Mimi Leder	Virgil Williams	February 11, 2005	2T5804
A music-bizz mystery occupies Jonny, who probes a drive-by shooting involving a volatile rapper with a secret past and his famous fiance, who hires Jonny as a bodyguard.
5	"No Good Deed"	David Von Ancken	David Weinstein	January 21, 2005	2T5805
Jonny asks a tough guy in prison to watch out of a young man that's going in. The tough asks for a favor and Jonny has to dig up some money and give it to his ex-partner, ex-wife and ex-girlfriend. All hell breaks loose when Jonny tries to finish the mission as the tough's exs seem to want nothing to do with him.
6	"La Familia"	Félix Enríquez Alcalá	R. Scott Gemmill	January 28, 2005	2T5806
Jonny helps a young girl, named Sal, learn how to box while at the same time trying to keep her from gang life. The boxing training allows Sal to make a difference with her life but when she learns the rival gangs have injured her sister, she makes decides to get revenge and Jonny must stop her before she throws her life away.
7	"Bounty"	Tawnia McKiernan	Terri Hughes Burton & Ron Milbauer	February 18, 2005	2T5807
A man who's been convicted of insider trading, skips bail in order to see his pregnant wife give birth. As a bounty hunter searches for the father, Jonny is hired to keep the hunter busy until the birth.
8	"Lost and Found"	Mimi Leder	David Weinstein	February 25, 2005	2T5808
Jonny is tricked into tracking down a former Mafia soldier turned federal witness; Stringer turns up the heat on Jonny, wanting him to get in deeper with Garret and making Jonny fear a return to his old ways.
9	"To Serve and Protect"	Lesli Linka Glatter	R. Scott Gemmill	March 4, 2005	2T5809
Jonny's parole officer, Gloria, asks for help when her husband is killed in the line of duty. Jonny gets into trouble that might send him back to jail while also trying to help Eve with her drug problem.
10	"Diamonds & Guns"	Henry Bronchtein	Terri Hughes Burton & Ron Milbauer	April 2, 2007 (Australia)	2T5810
Jonny partners with his bounty hunter friend Aly, for what he thinks will be a quick and easy stakeout to recover a stolen ice cream truck. Nothing is what it seems as Jonny will get more than just ice cream.
11	"Sins of the Father"	Félix Enríquez Alcalá	Virgil Williams	April 16, 2007 (Australia)	2T5811
Jonny discovers that his father was robbed and hospitalized. He furiously tracks down the culprits but can he restrain himself in order to avoid violating his parole?
12	"Wired"	Llewellyn Wells	Mere Smith	April 23, 2007 (Australia)	2T5812
FBI agents force Jonny to take part in a sting operation. The federal agents want him to record his former boss making a deal with the militia leaders.
13	"Betrayal"	Jean de Segonzac	R. Scott Gemmill	April 30, 2007 (Australia)	2T5813
Jonny must navigate his way through a complex scheme to bring down his former boss.
