= Brennan Hesser =

American television actress

Brennan Hesser is an American television actress, best known for co-starring in Tori Spelling's VH1 sitcom, So NoTORIous. She also starred in Fox's drama, Jonny Zero. She also guest starred in an episode of the CBS television show, The Guardian. In 2012, she starred in the web series SuperMoms, released on Facebook.

As a child actor, she performed in the 1999 film The Lost Treasure of Sawtooth Island.

As a child, she attended the Interlochen Arts Camp in Northern Michigan. She later attended Carnegie Mellon University, graduating in 2003.
