= Gregory Qaiyum =

American actor, writer and rapper

- Born: Gregory James Qaiyum; February 6, 1976 (age 50); Chicago, Illinois, U.S.
- Occupations: Actor, writer, rapper
- Years active: 2001–present

Gregory James Qaiyum (born February 6, 1976), better known by his initials GQ, is an American actor, writer and rapper.

The son of a German and English mother and a Pakistani father, GQ was raised in Chicago, where he attended Loyola Academy (high school), and later studied at New York University's (NYU) Tisch School of the Arts. Before graduating from the Experimental Theatre Wing of NYU, he put some friends together to create his senior project, merging hip hop and theater, combining two of his passions, rapping and acting. The result is off-Broadway production The Bomb-itty of Errors, in which GQ is actor, rapper, co-writer and original producer. The show won the jury prize for Best Show at the 2001 Aspen Comedy Festival.

GQ's first professional acting job was at the Manhattan Theatre Club in the hit London play, East is East. His film credits include What's the Worst That Could Happen?, On the Line, Drumline, and Taxi.

After his experience in theater, GQ turned his attention to television: a musical sketch/comedy series for MTV called Scratch & Burn. He and the other members of the Bomb-itty crew, including his younger brother, JAQ (who also wrote and produced all of the music for the show), created, wrote and starred in the series.

GQ's next project was his directorial debut for a film for Showtime called Just Another Story, which he wrote and starred in as well. GQ also guest-starred on Fox's Boston Public, writing his own rhymes for a role as a delinquent student in a Shakespeare class who brought the material to life for the other bored students by rapping it.

In 2012, the Q Brothers debuted their newest Shakespeare adaptation, Othello: The Remix, a 90-minute hip-hop version of Othello that was part of the Globe to Globe Festival and World Shakespeare Festival.

GQ lives in Los Angeles. Alongside his brother JAQ, the two have created Q Brothers Productions and are working together on an album, The Feel Good Album Of The Year, a mix of jazz, rock, R&B and electronica.

== Selected filmography ==
Year	Title	Role
2001	On the Line	Eric
2001	What's the Worst That Could Happen?	Shelly Nix
2001	Perfume	Charlie
2002	Scratch & Burn (TV series)	Himself
2002	Drumline	Jayson
2003	Boston Public (TV series)	Daryl
2003	Just Another Story	Director/Stix
2004	Taxi	Mario
2004	Man with a Van	Keith
2005	Jonny Zero (TV series)	Random
2007	Rescue Dawn	Farkas
2007	I Think I Love My Wife	White Rapper in Elevator
2007	Numb3rs	Frank Fisher
2008	SIS	Spider
