= Ashley Rickards =

American actress

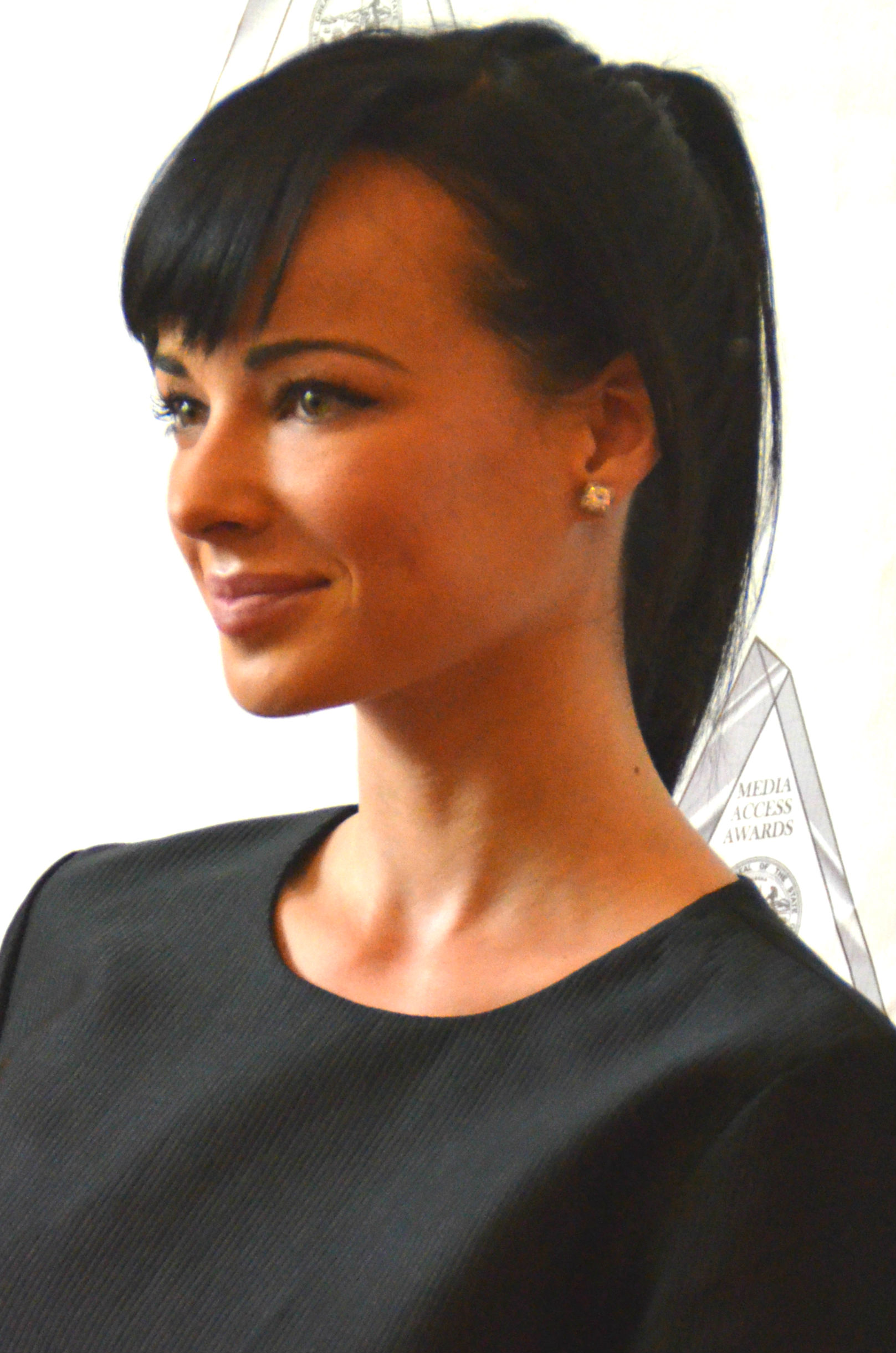
- Rickards at the Media Access Awards on October 16, 2014
- Born: May 4, 1992 (age 34); Sarasota, Florida, U.S.
- Occupations: Actress; director
- Years active: 2005–present

Ashley Rickards (born May 4, 1992) is an American actress, known for her role as Jenna Hamilton in the MTV comedy-drama series Awkward, and as Samantha "Sam" Walker, a troubled young girl in The CW's teen drama series One Tree Hill. She also starred in the 2011 independent drama film Fly Away as Mandy, an autistic girl.

== Early life and acting career ==
Born on May 4, 1992 in Sarasota, Florida, Rickards grew up on a horse farm that catered to children with special needs. She attended a local Montessori school where, at age 13, she had her first experience of acting in an opera production. Rickards graduated from high school at age fifteen and is a member of Mensa. After attending a local talent showcase, organized by Lou Pearlman, Rickards traveled to Los Angeles where she eventually gathered a team of representatives. Upon graduating, Rickards began to appear in a number of minor roles, while child labor laws restricted the number of hours she was able to work. After making a number of guest appearances and shorts, she landed the role of Samantha Walker, a runaway foster child, in the sixth season of The CW's One Tree Hill. Although not aware of the show before auditioning, Rickards found that she "learned so much from acting techniques to different ways of shooting things". Her character did not return the following season, while in the same year she had a bit part in her first feature film, Gamer.

Rickards spent much of 2009 attending auditions while a proposed lead role in the film Dirty Girl fell through. In 2010, she appeared opposite Jimmy Smits in an episode of the legal drama Outlaw while she also auditioned for the lead role in the MTV series Awkward. Initially rejected, her manager Adam Griffin sent the producers a tape Rickards had made for Fly Away "to show how she can do anything". The actress landed both roles and filmed the pilot for the MTV series prior to Fly Away, a feature where she played a girl with severe autism.

As the lead in Awkward, Rickards' profile began to rise and she was also given the opportunity to direct an episode. In 2012, she had a minor role in the moderately successful comedy Struck by Lightning and another coming-of-age film Sassy Pants. In 2014, Rickards moved into the horror genre with a lead role in At the Devil's Door and as a teenage daughter in A Haunted House 2. In 2015, she filmed the fifth and final season of Awkward. In August 2016 it was announced that Rickards would play Rosalind "Rosa" Dillon/The Top in the CW series The Flash. She also featured in the first season of comedy series Ctrl Alt Delete that aired in 2019.

== Other activities ==
In 2011, Rickards helped to launch the Project Futures Somaly Mam Foundation, which works to prevent and end human trafficking and sexual slavery in Southeast Asia. In March 2015, she published the book A Real Guide to Really Getting It Together Once and For All (Really).

Over the course of her career, she has also appeared in various music videos such as The Fray's "How to Save a Life", The Format's "She Doesn't Get It", and M83's "Claudia Lewis".

== Filmography ==
=== Film ===
Year	Title	Role	Notes
2006	Web Journal Now	Janet	Short film
2007	Spoonfed	Bridgette	Short film
2009	Gamer	2Katchapredator	
2011	Fly Away	Mandy	
2012	Struck by Lightning	Vicki Jordan	
2012	Sassy Pants	Bethany Pruitt	
2014	At the Devil's Door	Hannah	
2014	A Haunted House 2	Becky	
2014	Behaving Badly	Kristen Stevens	
2017	The Outcasts	Virginia Van Der Camp	
2017	Antisocial.app	Jessie	
2018	Pretty Little Stalker	Mallory	
2020	Smiley Face Killers	Alana	

=== Television ===
Year	Title	Role	Notes
2006	Everybody Hates Chris	Girl	Episode: "Everybody Hates Superstition"
2007	CSI: NY	Young Lindsay Monroe	Episode: "Sleight Out of Hand"
2007	Zoey 101	Molly Talbertsen	Episode: "Dance Contest"
2007	Ugly Betty	Sharra	Episodes: "Grin and Bear It" and "A League of Their Own"
2008–2009	One Tree Hill	Samantha "Sam" Walker	Recurring role
2008	Entourage	Candice	Episode: "The All Out Fall Out"
2010	Outlaw	Tracy Vidalin	Episode: "In Re: Tracy Vidalin"
2011–2016	Awkward	Jenna Hamilton	Main role; also directed episode: "Listen to This"
2011	American Horror Story: Murder House	Chloe Stapleton	Episodes: "Halloween (Part 2)" and "Piggy Piggy"
2015	Robot Chicken	Jenna Hamilton, Betty Cooper, Ashley (voice)	Episode: "Cake Pillow"
2015	Scream	Jenna Hamilton	Promotional campaigns for season 1
2016–2017, 2021–2022	The Flash	Rosalind "Rosa" Dillon / The Top	Recurring role
2017	Dimension 404	Susan Hirsch	Episode: "Chronos"
2019	Ctrl Alt Delete	A'sha	6 episodes

=== Music videos ===
Year	Title	Role	Artist
2006	"How to Save a Life"	Girl	The Fray
2007	"She Doesn't Get It"	Love interest	The Format
2013	"Claudia Lewis"	Girl	M83

== Awards and nominations ==
Year	Award	Category	Work	Result
2011	Arizona International Film Festival	Best Performance	Fly Away	Won
2012	Critics' Choice Television Award	Best Actress in a Comedy Series	Awkward	Nominated
2012	Teen Choice Award	Summer TV Star: Female	Awkward	Nominated
