= Awkward (TV series) =

2011 American teen comedy-drama series

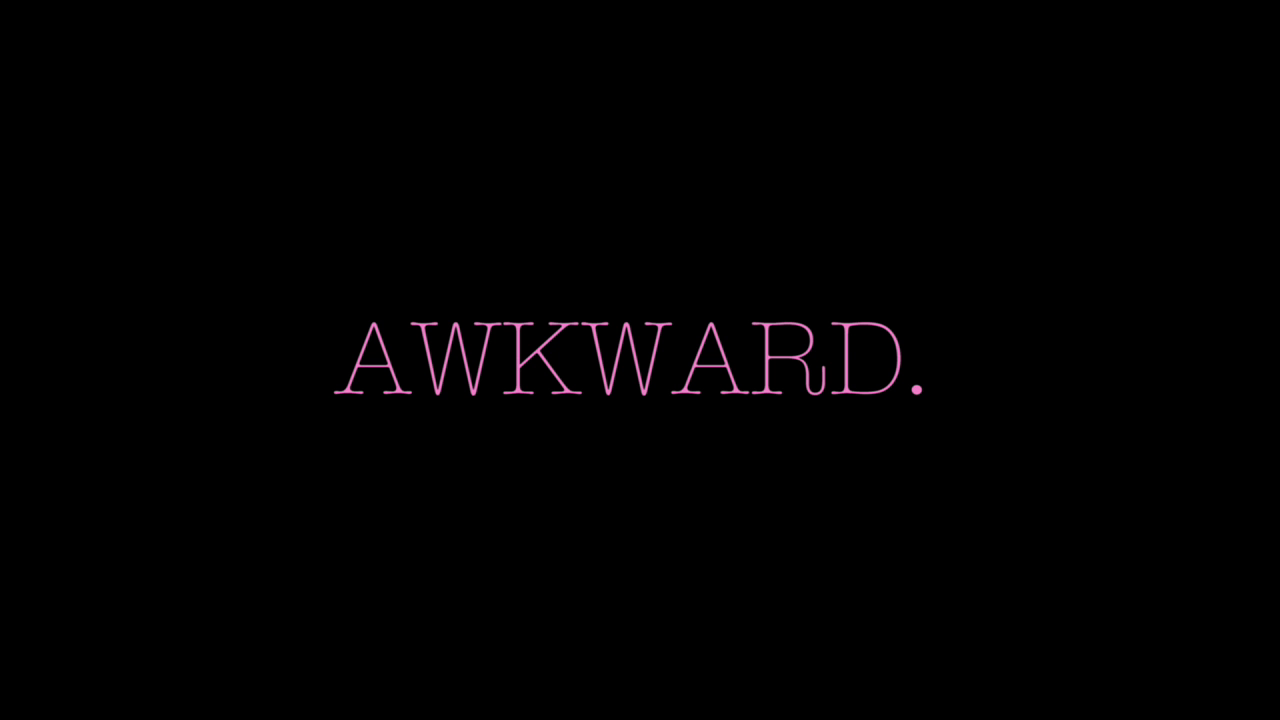
- Genre: Teen drama; Comedy drama
- Created by: Lauren Iungerich
- Showrunners: Lauren Iungerich (seasons 1–3); Chris Alberghini (seasons 4 & 5); Mike Chessler (seasons 4 & 5)
- Starring: Ashley Rickards; Beau Mirchoff; Nikki DeLoach; Jillian Rose Reed; Brett Davern; Molly Tarlov; Desi Lydic; Jessica Lu; Greer Grammer
- Narrated by: Ashley Rickards
- Music by: Brad Breeck
- Country of origin: United States
- Original language: English
- No. of seasons: 5
- No. of episodes: 89 (list of episodes)

Production
- Executive producers: Lauren Iungerich; Erin Ehrlich; Chris Alberghini; Mike Chessler
- Producer: Robert West
- Production locations: Los Angeles, California
- Cinematography: Steve Gainer (series); Eric Haase (pilot)
- Running time: 20–60 minutes
- Production companies: Crazy Cat Lady Productions; MTV Production Development

Original release
- Network: MTV
- Release: July 19, 2011 – May 24, 2016

Awkward is an American teen comedy-drama television series created by Lauren Iungerich for MTV. The show's central character is Jenna Hamilton (Ashley Rickards), a Palos Verdes, California, teenager who struggles with her identity, especially after an accident is misconstrued as a suicide attempt.

The series premiered on July 19, 2011, and was renewed for a second season in August 2011. In June 2013, it was announced that creator Iungerich would be exiting the series after production of the third season concluded in June 2013. MTV renewed the series for a fourth season in August 2013 with new showrunners Chris Alberghini and Mike Chessler replacing Iungerich.

Awkward's first season was generally well received, with television critics praising the show's realism and writing as well as its central character, and it was included in various critics' top ten lists. The show also earned several award nominations, winning one Teen Choice Award and one People's Choice Award.

In October 2014, Awkward was renewed for a fifth and final season, which premiered in August 2015. The second half of the fifth season did not begin to air until March 2016. Alberghini indicated that there could possibly be a sixth season. While most cast members agreed that they would happily return in that event, telling fans to let MTV know if they wanted more seasons, no further episodes of the series were produced. The series finale aired on May 24, 2016. During the course of the series, 89 episodes of Awkward aired over five seasons.

== Premise ==
Social outcast Jenna Hamilton has a freak accident but it is mistaken for a suicide attempt because she had received a harsh "care-frontation" letter suggesting ways on how she could be less unpopular. She begins a blog that helps her deal with various teen issues such as boy troubles, peer pressure, and maintaining friendships. By making changes and embracing her misfortune, she grows up and becomes well known among her peers, for better or worse.

== Episodes ==
Season	Episodes		Originally released	
Season	Episodes		First released	Last released
1	12		July 19, 2011	September 27, 2011
2	12		June 28, 2012	September 20, 2012
3	20	10	April 16, 2013	June 11, 2013
3	20	10	October 22, 2013	December 17, 2013
4	21	11	April 15, 2014	June 17, 2014
4	21	10	September 23, 2014	November 25, 2014
5	24	12	August 31, 2015	November 9, 2015
5	24	12	March 15, 2016	May 24, 2016

== Cast and characters ==
- Ashley Rickards as Jenna Hamilton, the titular "awkward" girl with an irreverent, optimistic outlook on life. The series begins with her receiving a brutal "care-frontation" letter that urges her to become less invisible. Jenna loses her virginity to and has a complicated on-off relationship with Matty McKibben. She is also an aspiring writer. Her best friends are Tamara Kaplan and (in earlier seasons) Ming Huang.
- Beau Mirchoff as Matty McKibben, Jenna's main love interest. He initially appears to be a typical popular jock but over the course of the series reveals a deeper, more sensitive side. He struggles when he is out of his comfort zone, as he normally doesn't have to try very hard to be well-liked or accepted. He has a complicated relationship with his parents, and discovered he was adopted mid-series. He later meets his birth father, who, like Jenna's parents, had Matty at a very young age. Matty's best friend is Jake Rosati.
- Nikki DeLoach as Lacey Hamilton, (Note: In season 5, Nikki DeLoach is only credited in episodes she appears in.) Jenna's young, appearance-obsessed mother who had Jenna as a teenager. She secretly wrote Jenna the brutal "care-frontation" letter in an ill-advised attempt to make her daughter more happy and popular. Once revealed, Jenna stopped speaking to her and Jenna's dad, Kevin, moved out of the family home. They later reconciled. She and Jenna seem to be polar opposites at times, but she has displayed genuine love and concern for her throughout the series. Her best friends are Ally Saxton and Val Marks.
- Jillian Rose Reed as Tamara Kaplan, Jenna's best friend and a perky, type A personality who is as obsessed with her own brand of slang as she is with becoming popular. Tamara is seen as fun and outgoing but also often bossy and annoying because of her loud antics. A recurring theme of the series is Tamara succeeding much easier at being well-liked (as a cheerleader, then later as Sadie Saxton's friend) than Jenna. Like Jenna, she also tends to lead a disastrous love life.
- Brett Davern as Jake Rosati, Matty's best friend and a brief love interest for Jenna. Jake is popular like Matty, but for different reasons; he's the class president, known for his smarts and tends to be well-liked by everyone for his caring nature. Later, Jake and Tamara date but break up over Tamara's personality. Jake goes through identity crises throughout the series, rejecting his goody two-shoes image to become a "cooler" singer and later as a "townie", electing to take a gap year from college to work in Palos Hills. His most frequent love interest is Lissa Miller.
- Molly Tarlov as Sadie Saxton, one of the most popular girls in school, though mostly because everyone fears her. Sadie is known for wit, particularly when it comes to caustic barbs that are usually followed by a sarcastic "You're welcome". She has an immense dislike for Jenna, and the feeling is mutual. Later, her father goes to jail because of a Ponzi scheme and her family loses all their riches, with her mother eventually abandoning Sadie. Her only serious relationship is with Sergio and Austin, who likes her despite how cruel she can be.
- Desi Lydic as Valerie Marks, (Note: In season 5, Desi Lydic is only credited in episodes she appears in.) the incompetent but well-intentioned guidance counselor at Palos Hills High. Jenna begins seeing her after her accident in the pilot is misinterpreted as a suicide attempt. Val displays extreme lapses in judgment both in her counseling of the students (particularly Jenna) as well as her own personal life. She sees Jenna as more of a close friend (often referring to her as "my girl") and later forms friendships with Lacey and Ally. Val dates a professional mascot named "Biggie". After the kids graduate, Val quits to "find herself".
- Greer Grammer as Lissa Miller (seasons 3–5; recurring seasons 1–2), (Note: In seasons 3 through 5, Greer Grammer is only credited in episodes she appears in.) a dimwitted cheerleader and Sadie's best friend; though she often serves as a clueless sidekick, she is wise emotionally and often gives random but great advice. Lissa is deeply religious, and often relates (and misinterprets) the teachings of Christianity to even the smallest things. Lissa's family is rocked by scandal when her dad admits he is gay. She initially hates Jenna for being friends with Jake, but then after a retreat camp, they become good friends. She dropped out of Vanderbilt in the final season to pursue being a "Palos Hills Mom". She also has an on-off relationship with Jake.
- Jessica Lu as Ming Huang (season 3; recurring seasons 1–2), (Note: In season 3, Jessica Lu is only credited in episodes she appears in.) Jenna's other best friend. She bucks Asian stereotypes because she, at first, has very little interaction with the other Asian students at Palos Hills, much to their confusion and derision. She's also demonstrated to have average at best grades. At first displaying more of a hipster, tomboy style (frequently accompanied by hats and beanies), Ming adopts a radical makeover in season 3 once she takes control of the "Asian Mafia", wearing her hair in blonde curls. She dates Fred Wu, ex-boyfriend of her nemesis Becca, but leaves before season 4 to attend a boarding school so she could apply for a decent college.

== Broadcast ==
The series premiered on July 19, 2011. MTV renewed the series for a second season on August 24, 2011. The second season premiered on June 28, 2012, at 10:30 pm. Awkward was officially renewed for a third season with an order of 20 episodes on July 25, 2012, which began airing on April 16, 2013, at 10:00 pm. On June 26, 2013, it was announced that the show's creator Lauren Iungerich would be exiting the show after production of season three concluded on June 27, 2013. The rest of the show's third season began airing on October 22, 2013.

MTV renewed the series for a fourth season on August 5, 2013, that premiered on April 15, 2014, with new showrunners, Chris Alberghini and Mike Chessler, to replace creator and former showrunner, Lauren Iungerich.

Awkward's first season was generally well-received with television critics praising the show's realism and writing as well as its central character, and was included in various critics' top ten lists. The show also earned several award nominations, winning one Teen Choice Award and one People's Choice Award.

On October 8, 2014, Awkward was renewed for a fifth and final season, which premiered on August 31, 2015. The mid-season finale aired on November 9, 2015; when the show returned in 2016, the story picked up during the summer after the characters' freshman year of college. The second half of season 5 premiered on March 15, 2016. Producer Chris Alberghini said that there could possibly be a season 6 if MTV decides and that there are more stories to tell. While most cast members agreed that they would happily return if there was a season 6, suggesting that fans should tell MTV if they want more seasons, no further episodes of the series were produced.

== Conception ==
Series creator Lauren Iungerich spent time with actual high school students to elaborate the teen dialogue of the show. She also met them to talk about their lives and to make sure the show reflects the reality. Speaking to the first three seasons' themes, Iungerich said:

The first season is really about identity and an exploration of "Who am I?" through the eyes of Jenna as she's exploring who she is. This season [season 2] the driving theme is, "Who do I want to be with?" and that doesn't just pertain to romantic entanglements but also to friendships and family for everyone. The driving force of Season 3 will be "Who do I want to be?" and making a choice in the decision of identity.

Citing her writing influences, Iungerich said she likes Friday Night Lights: "What Jason Katims did in five seasons was utterly beautiful. The story and who the people truly were came first. That's what I sort of took away from it; to be so bold as to graduate people, and wrap up story lines or allow them to come back in organic ways and to fall in love with the new characters. I want to take a lesson from that. Moving forward, I'm going to take a note from the brave things that he did in that show."

== Reception ==
=== Critical response ===
Awkward mostly received positive reviews for its first season. At Metacritic, which assigns a weighted mean rating out of 100 to reviews from mainstream critics, the TV series received an average score of 74, based on 13 reviews, which indicates "generally favorable reviews". The Wall Street Journal's Dorothy Rabinowitz explained Awkward is a "series about a high-school girl that's neither maudlin nor alarming nor conceived with intent to preach or to shock. It's further distinguished by its focus on entirely recognizable teenage pains, as endured by an entirely recognizable teenager, Jenna (Ashley Rickards). Its other distinction: strong echoes of an older kind of storytelling, the sort whose characters grow and acquire depth. This is a lot to expect these days from TV writing of any kind, much less a series about teenagers—it's relief enough when it's not about vampires." Hank Stuever of The Washington Post found that series "funny", which was "a pleasant surprise from MTV, the maker of so many lame teen comedies that I've lost count". The New York Times called Awkward as "a wry show about longing—for love, certainly, but also for consistency, that great intangible in the ever-morphing world of high school life". John Kubicek of BuddyTV website wrote "Just like Easy A, Mean Girls or other strong, female-centric teen comedies, Awkward has a quick wit and a very distinct vision of the world. It's the perfect blend of comedy and painful teenage awkwardness, and in the end, the title says it all." He concluded "The result is one of the most enjoyable and earnest teen comedies TV has produced". Writing for the San Francisco Chronicle, David Wiegand described the show as "a very smart mix of realism and satirical exaggeration" and praised the writing for being sharp. Curt Wagner of RedEye stated Awkward is "whip-smart and hilarious" while lauding the sharpness of the writing, stating: "With the right amount of exaggerated realism, creator Lauren Iungerich turns all the yearning, pain and, well, awkwardness of high school into a frothy, funny satire that should make anyone feel better about their own fumbling ways."

The New York Post writer Linda Stasi gave the show a three stars rating out of four commenting "aside from the gratuitous sexual stuff, Awkward is a really good, funny, fun show". However, Stasi mentioned "this just isn't the kind of thing you'd want to watch with your kids—nor want your kids to watch". According to The Philadelphia Daily News, "Awkward, like Glee, deals gently and semicomically with issues of sexuality and bullying but never really draws blood". HitFix's Daniel Fienberg gave the show a B rating commenting "Not only are high school horrors pretty universal, even if the specifics change, but I can find a way to fit Awkward into a tradition of hyper-literal high school comedies like Pretty in Pink or Heathers or Mean Girls or Juno. It's not as good as any of those, but it's not as bad as Jawbreaker, which is in the same tradition." Variety's Brian Lowry was less enthusiastic about the show: "While the premise is refreshingly gimmick-free compared with RJ Berger or Teen Wolf, the situations aren't compelling enough to make this much more than a latter-day Doogie Howser, M.D. with a gender switch."

The character of Jenna Hamilton has received positive feedback. Entertainment Weekly wrote Jenna "navigates the sharky waters of high school, friends, mean cheerleaders, and cute boys with a snarky voice-over that makes her—and Awkward.—easy to fall in love with". The Huffington Post deemed Jenna's voice-overs "witty" as "[they] make this high-school dark comedy stand out from a crowd of stereotypical high school prime-time soaps". David Hinckley of the Daily News gave the show a four stars rating out of five and wrote "Awkward is very good". He explained "For all the times we've seen the high school outcast who feels alternately ignored and humiliated by her peer group, she has rarely been played better than Ashley Rickards plays Jenna Hamilton." and went on "If the dramas are exaggerated, Jenna makes the trauma feel legitimate, and her narration gives everything a knowing undertone of humor and self-awareness that keeps the most uncomfortable moments from being painful." Stasi compared Ashley Rickards to Juno actor Elliot Page: "Rickards is a great teen actress of the [Elliot] Page variety—the kind of kid whose pretty face and adorable bearing is swamped by [their] ability to look awkward and offbeat." The Washington Post wrote of Rickards: "Following the well-trod path of Molly Ringwald's Sixteen Candles and Claire Danes's My So-Called Life, she effortlessly manages to elevate the unfresh premise of MTV's new Tuesday night comedy series, Awkward, to something that is tawdry yet honest.

Other characters' performances were also well received by critics. Kubicek appreciated that the show's villain, Sadie Saxton, is not "the typical perfect skinny girl" but "an overweight cheerleader who is popular only thanks to her parents".

=== Critics' top ten lists ===
Following its first season, Awkward was included in various critics' top ten lists.

- The Daily Beast (unranked list)
- The Huffington Post (unranked alphabetical list)
- IMDb (unranked list)
- The New York Daily News (unranked list)
- The New York Times (unranked alphabetical list)

=== Accolades ===
Year	Award	Category	Nominee(s)	Result	Ref.
2012	Critics' Choice Television Awards	Best Comedy Actress	Ashley Rickards	Nominated	
2012	Teen Choice Awards	Summer TV Star: Female	Ashley Rickards	Nominated	
2012	Teen Choice Awards	TV Breakout Star: Male	Beau Mirchoff	Won	
2012	Young Artist Award	Best Performance in a TV Series – Leading Young Actress	Jillian Rose Reed	Nominated	
2013	People's Choice Awards	Favorite Cable TV Comedy	Awkward	Won	
2013	Young Artist Award	Best Performance in a TV Series – Guest Starring Young Actor 11–13	Robbie Tucker	Nominated	
2014	People's Choice Awards	Favorite Cable TV Comedy	Awkward	Nominated	
2015	People's Choice Awards	Favorite TV Dramedy	Awkward	Nominated	

== Home media ==
Name	Episodes	Release dates		
Name	Episodes	Region 1	Region 2	Region 4
Season 1	12	November 15, 2011	October 4, 2012	October 17, 2012
Season 2	12	October 16, 2012	TBA	TBA
Season 3, Part 1	10	August 3, 2013	TBA	TBA
Seasons 1 and 2	24	October 1, 2013	TBA	TBA
Season 3, Part 2	10	June 3, 2014	TBA	TBA
Season 3	20	August 5, 2014	TBA	TBA
Season 4	21	July 30, 2015	TBA	TBA
Season 5	24	November 15, 2016	TBA	TBA
