= Chris Alberghini =

American television director and producer

- Born: September 27, 1965 (age 60); Plymouth, Massachusetts, U.S.
- Occupations: Television director, Producer
- Known for: The Nanny; Murphy Brown; So NoTORIous; Reba; 90210; Awkward; Daytime Divas; BH90210
- Notable work: Awkward (Seasons 4 and 5, Showrunner and Executive Producer); Daytime Divas (Showrunner and Executive Producer); BH90210 (Co-creator, Showrunner, and Executive Producer)

Chris Alberghini (born September 27, 1965 in Plymouth, Massachusetts) is an American television director and producer. Alberghini has worked on many shows, including The Nanny, Murphy Brown, Tori Spelling's VH1 sitcom, So NoTORIous, Reba, 90210 and many others. With Mike Chessler, he was showrunner and Executive Producer of Seasons 4 and 5 of MTV’s hit comedy Awkward as well as VH1’s scripted comedic drama Daytime Divas starring Vanessa Williams. With Tori Spelling and Jennie Garth, he co-created Fox’s critically acclaimed Beverly Hills, 90210 reboot BH90210, Fox’s highest-rated summer series of 2019. With Mike Chessler, he also served as showrunner and Executive Producer.
