= Jenna Hamilton =

Jenna P. Hamilton
- First appearance: "Awkward." (episode 1.01)
- Created by: Lauren Iungerich
- Portrayed by: Ashley Rickards

In-universe information
- Nicknames: Invisible Girl; That Girl; J-town; Lil' Bitch; Homewrecker Hamilton; Hamiltoe
- Gender: Female
- Occupation: College student
- Family: Kevin Hamilton (father); Lacey Hamilton (mother); Unnamed grandparents Morgan Hamilton (sister)
- Significant others: Matty McKibben (boyfriend); Jake Rosati (ex-boyfriend); Collin Jennings (ex-boyfriend); Luke (ex-boyfriend)
- Birthday: December 2

Jenna Hamilton is a fictional character from the teen comedy-drama television series Awkward., which aired on MTV in the United States. The character was created by series' producer Lauren Iungerich, and is portrayed by Ashley Rickards. She is the series' protagonist and also serves as the narrator.

== Storylines ==
Jenna P. Hamilton is an eighteen-year-old high school student. She is the daughter of Lacey and Kevin Hamilton, who had Jenna when they were seventeen, and it's specified that when Lacey's pregnancy got uncovered to Kevin's folks, they had an irate showdown with her, and to exacerbate the situation, this brought about Lacey's hurling, yet it is obscure as to whether they've made up from that point forward. Jenna was born on December 2, 1995, in Los Angeles at 7:32 p.m. Since her folks had her at a youthful age, they are whimsical and humiliating towards Jenna, as they both endeavor to be her companion as opposed to a parent. She is best friends with Tamara and Ming Huang. She has her own blog, I am Jenna, where she writes about whatever is going on in her life.

=== Season one ===
While working at a summer camp, Jenna loses her virginity to her longstanding crush Matty McKibben. While he does like her, Matty does not want to be seen with her so they date in secret. In the meantime, she receives an anonymous "carefrontation" letter about how she could disappear and no one would notice. This leads her to having an accident in her bathroom which appears as a suicide attempt. This situation makes Jenna infamous at her high school; being constantly referred to as "that girl," with varying crazy stories over how she tried to kill herself. She gets noticed by Matty's best friend, Jake Rosati. Little by little, they get to know each other and Jake eventually kisses her as he has developed feelings for her, though he already has a girlfriend. At the end of the first season, Jenna decides to go to the year's Formal with Jake, but only as friends, as she is still uncertain about Matty, who did not explicitly invite her. At the dance, she realizes that she can no longer wait for Matty (who she thinks is still undecided, but who now truly wants to commit) and starts a relationship with Jake. It is also revealed that it was her mother Lacey, who wrote the letter.

=== Season two ===
In the aftermath of the letter-revelation, Jenna did not to talk to her Mom until she tells the truth to her Dad. Jenna's Mom finally admits it to her husband, which causes them to separate forever. Jenna's relationship with Jake goes great until Matty tries to ruin it. Becoming obsessed of Matty's new girlfriend, Jenna questions her relationship with Jake. After Jake tells her he loves her, she considers making love with him as she thinks it might clarify her feelings for him. Jenna finally realizes she is in love with Jake, declaring her love for him in a voice mail while at Aunt Ally's wedding. However, after Sadie Saxton tells him about Matty and Jenna's past, he breaks up with her. Matty comes over to her house to comfort her and she admits she still has feelings for him. They passionately share a kiss, which is seen by Jake, who stood outside as he was on the point to make up with her. Jenna tries to fix things with Jake but he keeps ignoring her. He sends her a picture of her and Matty making out, showing that he now knows everything. She tries again several times to explain to him what happened but he says he cannot trust her anymore. In the meantime, Jake stops being friends with Matty and the two get into a fight. Jenna decides to forward her blog to everyone so Jake can see the whole truth. The next day at school Jenna asks Jake if he read her blog and he tells her that she has humiliated him. However, after watching a film in French class, Jake and Matty decide to patch things up between them but they reveal to each other that they are both still in love with Jenna. They then tell Jenna that she has to pick between the pair. In deciding, Jenna imagines alternate scenes where she chooses one over another. She eventually chooses Matty but soon begins to have second thoughts as she decides to spend the summer with Matty while Jake will go to Europe with Tamara.

=== Season three ===
Jenna and Matty have been dating for over seven months, and are about to start their junior year. She feels confused over whether she should have gone to Europe since her friends had all these new experiences without her, but Tamara, who is now officially dating Jake, assures her that they will always be best friends. Once school starts, Jenna is put into an advanced writing class run by Mr. Hart, who's known for being hard on his students. She initially tries to get out of the class, but Val convinces her that she needs to grow and try new things. It's revealed that the reason behind Jenna's new-found anxiety is that she might be pregnant after having unprotected sex with Matty one time during the summer. When it turns out to be a false alarm, her mother decides to help Jenna get on birth control, but warns her not to tell Matty about the pregnancy scare. She later tells Jake during Ricky Schwartz's vigil/keg party, which causes Matty to get upset and leave. She believes that Matty might break up with her when he tells her they need to talk. He instead explains that he felt jealous over how she can easily talk to Jake. Jenna explains that she is insecure sometimes about their relationship since Matty didn't want to be seen with her, but he assures her that he was never embarrassed by her. Jenna's father then discovers her birth-control pills, and calls Matty's parents to tell them that their children are having sex. This leads to an uncomfortable dinner between Jenna and Matty's families. While things seem to be going okay, Matty's mother ends up getting into a fight with Lacey over her decision to put Jenna on the pill. This causes Matty to get into a fight with his parents over how they treated Jenna's family. He temporarily stays at the Hamilton house. After being called out by Mr. Hart for not taking risks, Jenna decides to read an excerpt from her blog for an open-mic night. The reading goes well, and she ends up staying behind to hang out with Collin, a guy from her English class. Jenna begins to develop feeling for Collin, leading her to cheat on Matty. Jenna gets caught at her surprise party and she and Matty later break up. Jenna continues her relationship with Collin, which leads her into having sex with him just because she doesn't want to lose him, later smoking weed, and even getting ecstasy slipped into her drink by Collins ex- girlfriend. Jenna realizes she had hit rock bottom and wants to make up with her friends and family. Jenna breaks up with Collin and apologizes to everyone about her actions. Afterward, Jenna realizes that she still has feelings for Matty.

=== Season four ===
==== Part 1 ====
Senior year opens with Jenna's parents walking in on her pleasuring herself, and word gets around fast. Matty has broken up with Bailey and stayed single all summer, so the two of them end up hooking up again. Jenna and Matty settle into a friends-with-benefits setup, though it's clear Matty mostly wants the benefits. Jenna throws herself into peer mentoring instead. On an overnight college visit with Tamara, Jenna meets Luke, a brainy college guy who helps her get over Matty. A later visit to his campus shows her he takes school far more seriously than she wants to. At a concert outing, Jenna tries to set Matty up with Eva and realizes she still has feelings for him. The night ends with Matty and Jake arrested for underage drinking. During college application season, Jenna helps Matty with his essay, but Eva sabotages it. On the senior ski trip, Jenna is torn between Luke and Matty. Sadie learns Eva's real name is Amber, that she was home-schooled after being expelled at nine for stabbing a classmate, and that her room is covered in obsessive boards about Jenna and Matty. Sadie and Jenna team up to expose her, but Eva claims to be pregnant and Matty won't leave her.

==== Part 2 ====
After the ski trip, Jenna focuses on finals while Matty grows suspicious of Eva once her pregnancy becomes public. Jenna hopes for a quiet New Year's Eve with Matty, but he turns it into a group night at Sadie's party. There, the two agree not to hook up with anyone. Jenna kisses a sophomore named Owen, then tells him it was a one-time thing as college acceptances start arriving. At the senior bonfire, Jenna and Tamara discover the boys' tradition of rating girls in a "Phone Book." They retaliate with a "Dude Database" that goes viral, exposes a secret, and strains their friendship. The whole school turns on Jenna while Tamara won't admit her part. Jenna competes with Gabby, Matty's new girlfriend, to make his 18th birthday special, and the two become real friends. Jenna then feels guilty about a kiss with Matty, accidentally lets it slip to Gabby, and ends up on bad terms with both of them. Matty invites Jenna to meet his biological father, but Gabby takes her place at the last minute. Jenna finally gets a college acceptance, and Sadie wins a scholarship to Columbia. Jake sleeps with Gabby after being rejected by every college he applied to. Jenna learns she's going to be a big sister and connects with a marine named Brian. The season ends with Matty watching Jenna and Brian on the beach, realizing he still has feelings for her but believing he has to move on.

=== Season five ===
==== Part 1 ====
On senior prank day, Jenna overhears Gabby and Jake talking about their hookup and keeps quiet. Matty decides his feelings for Jenna were just a phase and commits to Gabby. When Gabby finds out he was planning to dump her, she breaks up with him first and reveals the Jake hookup. Matty punches Jake. Jenna knocks out the school's power by accident, and everyone assumes she did it on purpose to cancel school. She suddenly becomes popular while Matty, after a viral video, drops to the bottom. She soon realizes being popular isn't as fun as she expected. Jenna gets stuck with a "Most Depressing" yearbook superlative and is hurt when Matty writes something shallow in her yearbook, until he explains that she's his best friend. At Tamara's engagement party, a drunk Gabby tells Jenna that Matty still loves her. Jenna then accidentally spills Tamara's secret about ending her engagement, and Adam overhears. Tamara blames Jenna for wrecking all her relationships. That night, a Sex and the City–themed dream makes Jenna realize she never stopped loving Matty. Matty is accepted to Berkeley just as Jenna is ready to tell him she loves him, so she holds back because they'll be at different schools. Jenna's prom dress get ruined before prom, with all the shops closed, Tamara calls in a favor to get Jenna a new dress. Matty realizes he still has feelings for Jenna. He spends prom trying to find Jenna but she left Prom early after ruining her dress. They finally meet for a dance at Prom and Matty tells Jenna he still loves her. Matty tells Jenna he has to leave for Berkeley right after graduation for summer soccer, leaving them one day together. Val then turns the graduation ceremony into a surprise wedding for herself and Biggie. By the end, Jenna and Matty decide they love each other and want to stay together over the summer.

==== Part 2 ====
Jenna is home for the summer after her freshman year of college, and she and Matty are no longer together. In Flashbacks, Jenna and Matty reveal they have changed into different people while at collages and have grown apart. Jenna gets a summer fellowship at Ideabin. Luke is a second year fellow and without her knowledge, helps Jenna get the fellowship. After having a rough start at Ideabin, Jenna gets Tamara an internship there to feel less alone, and working with her best friend quickly backfires. Jenna and Tamara get a job at the Palos Hills country club for the 4th of July, but they get Jake fired after a party gets out of hand. Jenna writes an article about her relationship with Matty. It goes viral, and Matty is hurt that she made private details public. She scrambles to get it taken down. Luke and Jenna hook up and start dating again while at Ideabin. Luke wants to keep it a secret to protect her from favoritism at work. Jenna babysits her little sister, and Matty spends the night and helps her. Jenna starts to fantasize about Matty as father to a baby and accidentally suggests moving in with Luke instead. When Jenna and Luke fight over an article she wrote about there relationship, she signs up for her camp reunion hoping to reconnect with Matty. In a game of "Truth or Truth" they admit their feelings, but Matty says his timing has always been off. Luke apologizes and reveals he emailed the dean at SCU about her writing, which got the school interested in her transferring. Jenna and Luke make up. When Luke starts planning Jenna's future without asking her, she pushes back and finds her way back to Matty. Jenna has to choose between an important event at SCU and her camp reunion. She and Matty end up back in the closet where her story began, but this time Matty tells her to not choose him or Luke but to "choose herself" and that they always find a way back to each other. It ends will all the friend and family around the camp fire together.

=== Casting ===
Ashley Rickards first received the script through her representatives and then met the series' creator. "I met with Lauren Iungerich and it all went really well and all worked out. I got to do the project, it got picked up and here we are." Speaking of what appealed to her about the show, she said:

When I read the script, I literally fell in love with it. It struck as something completely different. It has a really unique voice. Not only is the show funny and charming, but it has the ability to cover so many different emotions in 22 minutes -- from the hilarious, to the psychological, to having a dramatic edge all in a 22 minute comedy is an incredibly difficult thing to do. That was exciting for me.

=== Characterization ===
Rickards described her character as "smart, sarcastic, a little bit witty and very intuitive." She also said Jenna "can be the shy, introverted girl, whereas on her blog she's snarky, she's introspective, she's a little bit wiser, she'll write the truth... and then probably not act on it." Rickards called her a "role model" because "every time she gets kicked down, she gets back up fighting" while it is sometimes easier to give up.

== Reception ==
The character, along with Rickards performance, was critically acclaimed and continues to be praised by critics. Daniel Fienberg of HitFix applauded Rickards' acting, writing that "she effectively embodies the Everygirl vibe required for the part. She's got good timing, decent physical comedy chops and there's no ego to this performance." New York Post's TV critic Linda Stasi compared Rickards to actor Elliot Page, explaining she is "the kind of kid whose pretty face and adorable bearing is swamped by her ability to look awkward and offbeat." Hank Stuever of The Washington Post was also positive towards Rickards' performance noting "she effortlessly manages to elevate the unfresh premise of MTV's new comedy." AfterElton.com placed Rickards on their list of 2011's Break-Out TV Actors, explaining: "Rickards gives Jenna a doe-eyed innocence and covers the full range of teen emotions, from deer-in-the-headlights paranoia to sultry eyelash batting, sometimes in the same scene. While putting the show on their list of the best TV shows of 2011, The Daily Beast called Rickards "a total standout". Her performance on the show earned her in 2012 a Critics' Choice Television Award nomination for Best Actress in a Comedy Series and a nomination at the Teen Choice Awards for Summer TV Star: Female.

Entertainment Weekly wrote Jenna "navigates the sharky waters of high school, friends, mean cheerleaders, and cute boys with a snarky voice-over that makes her—and Awkward.—easy to fall in love with." The Huffington Post deemed Jenna's voice-overs "witty" as "[they] make this high-school dark comedy stand out from a crowd of stereotypical high school prime-time soaps." David Hinckley of the Daily News wrote: "If the dramas are exaggerated, Jenna makes the trauma feel legitimate, and her narration gives everything a knowing undertone of humor and self-awareness that keeps the most uncomfortable moments from being painful." Reviewing the beginning of the second season, HitFix's Daniel Fienberg was critical of the Matty-Jenna-Jake triangle storyline which had been put forward, diminishing what he first liked: Jenna's look at the high school humiliations. He noted his indifference to Jenna's dilemma as "there's no jeopardy to either choice". "Whoever Jenna chooses is going to say almost nothing about her as a character, so it weakens the character that there's nothing else defining her at this moment", he wrote.
