= List of Liv and Maddie characters =

List of characters from 'Liv and Maddie'

Liv and Maddie is an American comedy television series created by John D. Beck and Ron Hart that aired on Disney Channel from July 19, 2013 to March 24, 2017. The series stars Dove Cameron, Joey Bragg, Tenzing Norgay Trainor, Kali Rocha, Benjamin King, and Lauren Lindsey Donzis.

A significant feature of the series is that Dove Cameron plays dual roles, one being Liv, an actress who has returned to her home after starring on a popular television series in Hollywood for four years, and the other one being Maddie, Liv's identical twin who remained behind. Another significant feature of the series are documentary-style cutaways where characters speak to the viewers to explain their opinions on various situations in each episode.

== Main ==
Main characters of Liv and Maddie, from left to right: Parker, Joey, Maddie, Karen, Liv, and Pete. (Use cursor to identify.)

=== Liv Rooney ===
Olivia "Liv" Rooney (Dove Cameron) is one of a pair of identical twins of the Rooney family. She is the eldest child of the family and older sister to Joey and Parker. Liv left the family for four years, beginning at the age of 11, to star in a popular television program, "Sing It Loud!", to which she continually refers. During her time on that show, Liv was living with her Aunt Dena. Liv is a sophomore at Ridgewood High. When Liv and Maddie celebrate their sweet sixteen in "Sweet 16-a-Rooney", Karen states that Liv, who was born at 11:56 PM, is six minutes older than Maddie, who was technically born a day later. Liv's siblings affectionately call her "Hollywood". At the end of the first season, Liv begins production on "Space Werewolves", a film adaptation of a fictional graphic novel series of the same name. Liv stars as Tristan Lycanth in the film adaptation after being able to fully master all the traits of the wolf with the help of writer Emmy "Fangs" Wulfert. Although the protagonist of the story was originally a boy in the graphic novels, Liv was picked for the role because of her acting career on "Sing It Loud!" and the role of Tristan was changed from a boy to a girl.

In "Skate-a-Rooney", it is referenced that between seasons of "Sing It Loud!", Liv filmed a movie called "The Skateboard Bandit". In "Brain-a-Rooney", Liv shows that she is smarter than people think she is by helping Joey and Artie win the Brain Olympics. It is shown that Liv shares the personality quirks of her mother, Karen, as seen in "Shoe-a-Rooney", when the pair reveals their affinity for shoes. In "Voltage-a-Rooney", Liv stars in a TV series adaption of the comic series "Voltage" that was mentioned in "Continued-a-Rooney". She portrays a cheerleader named Tess who was struck by lightning and becomes the superhero SkyVolt. In "Californi-a-Rooney", Liv and Maddie have a falling out at the time when Maddie goes to live with Aunt Dena after being accepted to the same college that Willow is at. After the two of them reconcile, Liv is persuaded by Maddie to stay with her. In "Linda and Heather-a-Rooney", the effects of Liv leaving Voltage to be with Maddie caused her to have a hard time finding another role. She does get a guest role on "Linda and Heather" which she nearly causes to stop production until she and Parker come up with a plan to keep it from ending. By the end of the episode, Liv is told that they want her to reprise her character for the sequel to "Sing It Loud!" called "Sing It Louder!!"

The back of Emmy Buckner's head is used to help create the character of Liv. She is Dove Cameron's look-alike double.

=== Maddie Rooney ===
Madison "Maddie" Rooney (Dove Cameron) is Liv's identical twin sister and the second eldest child of the Rooney family. Like Liv, she is older sister to Joey and Parker, as well as a sophomore at Ridgewood High. She is captain of the girls' basketball team of Ridgewood High and is equally diligent to her team captain duties as her studies. Her main love interest is Diggie, captain of Ridgewood High's boys' basketball team. However, because of his constant moving, they break up. Her new love interest is Liv's co-star in Voltage, Josh. Her catchphrase is "Bam! What?!", a phrase she came up with once at age 11 when she was telling Karen that she beat the boys at basketball. She is sometimes called Mads by Diggie and Willow, such as in "Slump-a-Rooney" and "Shoe-a-Rooney".

In "Sleep-a-Rooney", it is revealed that Maddie's full first name is "Madison". It is shown that Maddie shares the personality quirks of her father Pete, as seen in "Dump-a-Rooney", when the pair shows their competitive side while preparing for a two-on-two basketball tournament. In "Shoe-a-Rooney", Maddie becomes addicted to a comfortable pair of high heel shoes that she borrows from Liv. When the addiction becomes problematic, Liv, Willow, Diggie, and Stains stage an intervention which ends with Liv dropping the shoes into a woodchipper. In "Space-Werewolf-a-Rooney", Maddie injures her leg and is unable to play basketball. In "Pottery-a-Rooney", Maddie tries taking up the new hobby of pottery; however, it does not work out and she ends up going back to basketball. In "Helgaween-a-Rooney", Karen uses hypnotherapy to try to get Maddie over her fear of using her injured knee to shoot a three-pointer, but Maddie instead has a nightmare that she and Liv have a triplet named Helga. Maddie temporarily becomes the new sensei for Parker's karate class in "Match-a-Rooney". In "Muffler-a-Rooney", Maddie recovers from her knee injury and successfully plays basketball again.

The back of Shelby Wulfert's head is used to help create the character of Maddie. She is Dove Cameron's look-alike double.

=== Joey Rooney ===
Joseph Gilligan "Joey" Rooney (Joey Bragg) is the middle child of the Rooney family. He is the middle brother to Liv and Maddie and older brother to Parker. Joey is a student at Ridgewood High. Parker affectionately calls him "munch". Although close in age to his older twin sisters, only a school year younger as a freshman, Joey is perceived as immature and awkward, but also somewhat of a brainiac. Joey has a close relationship with his younger brother Parker, especially in pranking or being manipulative, but with Liv and Maddie's assistance, there is hope for growth. He is bitter rivals with Artie, one of his classmates.

In "Helgaween-a-Rooney", Joey and Parker want to see a haunted house magic show and use a magic amulet to clone themselves so they can sneak out for the night, but later the clones try to cook and eat the parents. Later, Karen tries her hypnotherapy on Joey to make him feel ready to take on the world, but all Joey can say is gibberish. Later in the series, he realizes that he is starting to develop a crush on Willow and they start dating.

=== Parker Rooney ===
Parker Rooney (Tenzing Norgay Trainor) is the youngest child of the Rooney family. He is 13 years old and a sixth-grader at an undisclosed school. However, he attends Joey's robotics club at Liv and Maddie's school twice a week. Parker is an intelligent and clever child with growing "playground buzz" who does karate and is somewhat manipulative. Parker even created his own set of tunnels which run to different parts of the house, Ridgewood High, and other locations. He is not a troublesome child, but somewhat of a trickster, as shown in "Fa-La-La-a-Rooney", when he swindles money from Joey in order to purchase an expensive toy he suspects no one would give him.

In "Kathy Kan-a-Rooney", one of Parker's dojo buddies, Splat, caught Parker watching "Linda and Heather", a show about two girls who are besties. It is eventually revealed that his other dojo buddies, including Splat, watch the show as well. Both Splat and Reggie go to Parker's house to watch the show together. In "Gift-a-Rooney", it is revealed Parker has an embarrassing middle name, which is skipped over by Parker's cutaway when Karen says it due to how much Parker hates it. In "Californi-a-Rooney", Parker's tunnels collapse due to Joey's bad move to preserve them, causing the entire family to move in with Aunt Dena as revealed in the final fourth-wall cutaway. When Parker plans to recreate his tunnels, the rest of the Rooneys shout no. This causes Parker to make plans to take his projects to the sky.

=== Karen Rooney ===
Karen Rooney (Kali Rocha) is married to Pete, the mother of Liv, Maddie, Joey, and Parker, and the older sister of Dena Rooney. She is the school psychologist for Ridgewood High and later the vice principal as of the second season. Karen often ineptly uses her knowledge of family psychology at home, sometimes forming family meetings and sharing her "punching pillows".

In "Sweet 16-a-Rooney", it is revealed that Karen had kept a secret that the twins were born on opposite sides of midnight and technically have separate birthdays, with Maddie being born six minutes and one day after Liv. In "BFF-a-Rooney", it is revealed that she chomps on ice when she is nervous. She has also demonstrated a tendency for blatant manipulation, compulsive hoarding, as shown in "Brain-a-Rooney", when she refuses to sell stuff that used to belong to members of the family, such as a box of toothbrushes that they have used, and "Rate-a-Rooney", when she refuses to get rid of unnecessary house decorations. In "Helgaween-a-Rooney", it is revealed that both Maddie and Joey have been hypnotized by Karen. In "Californi-a-Rooney", Karen has nastily taken over Parker's tunnels, which collapse when Joey cleans out Karen's belongings, one of which was holding the entire house up.

=== Pete Rooney ===
Pete Rooney (Benjamin King) is married to Karen and father of Liv, Maddie, Joey, and Parker. He is the gym teacher at Ridgewood High and coach of the girls' basketball team. Pete enjoys bringing competition into the home, often wearing his whistle and pushing Maddie to improve her basketball ability. Pete shows typical father characteristics, such as his misunderstandings of his daughters' emotional development. He shares his sons' creative mentality and becomes overprotective whenever Liv and Maddie have love interests. He also can disagree with Karen frequently, such as in "Rate-a-Rooney", when he wants to get rid of useless house decorations of which Karen cannot let go.

In "Ridgewood-a-Rooney", he becomes the coach of a college team in Beloit, Wisconsin, which Maddie later decides to attend in "Dream-a-Rooney". As a result of Pete's new job in "Coach-a-Rooney", he is succeeded in the coaching of the girls' basketball team by Mrs. Snodgrass. In "Sorta Sisters-a-Rooney", Pete is no longer a series regular and is said to be overseeing the rebuilding of the Rooney home while continuing his job in Beloit.

=== Ruby ===
Ruby (Lauren Lindsey Donzis) is the 11-year old cousin of the Rooney children and the daughter of Dena who resides in California. She is younger than Parker and plans to follow in Liv's footsteps by becoming an actress herself. She joins the series as a series regular in the fourth season.

== Recurring ==
=== Diggie ===
Digbert "Diggie" Smalls (Ryan McCartan) is Maddie's main love interest. He is the captain of the boys' basketball team of Ridgewood High and is perceived as confident and strong. Diggie affectionately calls Maddie "Rooney", though in "Twin-a-Rooney", he calls her "Rooney Classic" to distinguish her from Liv.

In "Move-a-Rooney", Diggie finally expresses his feelings toward Maddie after she tells him they are moving. Diggie is also seen as a mentor for Joey when it comes to anything related to being "cool". Diggie was also the manager of the local frozen yogurt shop. In the second season, he left Wisconsin to go to the nation of "Tundrabania" after Maddie injured her knee. In "Gift-a-Rooney", he makes his first physical appearance since the first season for his and Maddie's "meet-a-versary", courtesy of Liv. In "Flugelball-a-Rooney", he returns from Tundrabania only to break up with Maddie after he thinks she does not support his decision to go to Australia. It is revealed that he still has feelings for Maddie in "Video-a-Rooney". In "Frame-a-Rooney", it is revealed that Diggie is Artie's older brother when Diggie is annoyed with Artie's habits. In "Champ-a-Rooney", Diggie decides he wants to get back together with Maddie. In "Continued-a-Rooney", he and Maddie officially break up. In "Scoop-a-Rooney", Diggie returns and tells Maddie about him seeing a picture of Maddie with Josh, making him jealous with the fact that Maddie has moved on and has Josh a new boyfriend. In "Choose-a-Rooney", Maddie and Diggie get back together. In "End-a-Rooney", when Maddie gets the grant to make tiny houses in New Orleans, Diggie decides to come with her, saying all he wants is to be with her.

=== Maddie 2 ===
Maddie 2 (Shelby Wulfert) is the look-alike double character for Maddie.

=== Liv 2 ===
Liv 2 (Emmy Buckner) is the look-alike double character for Liv.

=== Willow ===
Winifred "Willow" Cruz (Jessica Marie Garcia) is Maddie's best friend and teammate. She plays center and often exclaims that she does not go down. She and Maddie share a special high-five. Willow's only weakness is her obsessive crush on Joey, as seen in "Slump-a-Rooney", when she misdirects a love note to be from him. Later in the series, Willow competes in the Battle of the Bands with Liv, Andie, and Holden, where she plays drums. They win the battle and continue to perform as a band. She and Joey are eventually officially boyfriend and girlfriend.

=== Stains ===
Astrid "Stains" Stanislowski (Bridget Shergalis) is a teammate and friend of Maddie's. She is a petite girl with a hearty appetite. She gets her name because her clothing gets inadvertently dirty in each episode she appears in. She has a recurring tendency to rub the side of her nose with her thumb whenever she gets involved in a scheme, as seen in "Team-a-Rooney", when the team rallies against Principal Fickman, in "Sweet 16-a-Rooney", when she helps plan a surprise party for Maddie, and in "Shoe-a-Rooney", when she has to take over for Maddie in a game because Maddie is too busy obsessing with her new shoes.

=== Evan ===
Evan (Carter Hastings) is one of Parker's dojo buddies. Evan is an underhandedly polite child, with an often excessive candor, whose mother is perceived as mildly overprotective. A year younger than Parker, the pair tends to get into difficult situations, with Parker often protecting Evan, as seen in "Slump-a-Rooney", when Parker helps Evan stand up to his mother. Evan also helps Karen "reprogram" Parker in "Shoe-a-Rooney", when Parker tries to avoid having to do chores by pretending to be incapable.

=== Johnny Nimbus ===
Johnny Nimbus (Kurt Long) is the local television weatherman who is often selected to host various events around town. Johnny is known to mispredict the weather. In "Secret-Admirer-a-Rooney", it is revealed that Johnny is dating Gemma.

In "Choose-a-Rooney", Johnny Nimbus and Gemma get married.

=== Artie ===
Artie Smalls (Jimmy Bellinger) is a classmate and proclaimed nemesis of Joey's. They are often competitive in proving who is smarter than the other, with Joey usually falling short, but they have worked together before, as shown in "Brain-a-Rooney" and "BFF-a-Rooney". Artie has some unnamed student followers who serve as his "minions".

In "Moms-a-Rooney", it is revealed that Artie has a crush on Joey's famous sister Liv. He is also a sci-fi fanatic, showing up at a promotional event for "Space Werewolves". In "Frame-a-Rooney", it is revealed that Artie is Diggie's brother. In "Match-a-Rooney", Liv turns down Artie's invitation to the Sadie Hawkins dance, but later changes her mind so that Willow can be Joey's date. In "Voice-a-Rooney", it is revealed that he has a kitten named after Liv; he also thanks Joey for taking care of the kitten when she gets lost.

=== Becky Bicklehoff ===
Becky Bicklehoff (Rena Strober) is Liv's manager.

=== Reggie ===
Reggie (Herbie Jackson) is one of Parker's dojo buddies. He takes karate classes with Parker and Splat and is often seen at the Rooney house. He refers to Parker as "Doctor P" and is often up for Parker's schemes. He assists Parker in creating a skin cream for Karen in exchange for baloney in "Gift-a-Rooney". Karen later tells Reggie Parker's middle name as Parker's punishment for creating a skin cream that grew long hair on her elbows and swelled up her feet. Alongside Parker, Reggie also loves the show "Linda and Heather" and is often seen watching it with him, singing the theme song.

=== Andie ===
Andie Bustamante (Victoria Moroles) is a friend Liv makes in the second season. She is introduced in "Upcycle-a-Rooney". She plays the bass in a band that includes Liv, Willow, and Holden.

In "Prom-a-Rooney", Andie is seen to like Holden and asks him to the prom. They are later seen dating. In "Triangle-a-Rooney", Holden breaks up with Andie and asks out Liv, but she denies him because of her friendship with Andie. In "SPARF-a-Rooney", Liv helps Andie get over her breakup. She later shows interest in Dump Truck in "Cowbell-a-Rooney", and it is mentioned in "Ridgewood-a-Rooney" that he gives her his leather jacket.

=== Dump Truck ===
Marion "Dump Truck" Truckberg (Shak Ghacha) is a misbehaving student at Ridgewood High whom Parker meets in detention. He is introduced in "Detention-a-Rooney", where he tells Parker to do his cleaning for him, but gains a newfound respect for Parker and becomes his friend after seeing him scrape gum off all the desks in school, nicknaming him "Gumball Machine".

In "Flugelball-a-Rooney", it is revealed that Dump Truck cannot ride a bike, but Parker later teaches him how to.

=== Holden ===
Holden (Jordan Fisher) is Liv's main love interest. He is introduced in "Neighbors-a-Rooney", where he has just come back from boarding school. At first, Liv dislikes him because when they were younger he stole her Goodbye Puppy pen, but he later confesses that he only took her pen because he had a childhood crush on her. Liv develops strong romantic feelings toward him; however, in "Prom-a-Rooney", Holden goes to the prom with Liv's friend Andie and begins a relationship that lasts for the remainder of the second season.

In "Band-a-Rooney", Liv, Willow, Holden, and Andie start a band together called "The Dream". In "Triangle-a-Rooney", Holden begins to realize his true feelings toward Liv after he sees that he and Andie are not right for each other. Liv and Holden come close to sharing their first kiss after singing a duet of True Love together, but are interrupted and caught by Willow. Holden finally figures out his feelings for Liv and breaks up with Andie, but ends up breaking up with her on live television. Later, Holden admits his feelings and asks out Liv and although Liv admits her feelings for him in return, she denies his request to start a relationship because of her friendship with Andie. However, Liv and Holden are shown to still harbor deep feelings for each other. Eventually in "Coach-a-Rooney", Liv and Holden finally became a romantic couple after Andie assures Liv that she no longer possesses any romantic feelings for him. Liv and Holden later break up in "Scoop-a-Rooney".

=== Gemma ===
Gemma (Chloé Wepper) is the television director of "Voltage". Liv considers her as the cooler version of Joey.

In "Secret-Admirer-a-Rooney", it is revealed that Gemma is dating Johnny Nimbus. In "Choose-a-Rooney", Gemma is married to Johnny Nimbus.

=== Josh ===
Josh Wilcox (Lucas Adams) is Liv's co-star in Voltage from California, where he plays Tess' love interest Garrison until "Skyvolt-a-Rooney", when Liv quits the show, allowing Josh to become the new Skyvolt.

In "Cowbell-a-Rooney", Liv tries to help Josh become more active and creates a Pilates arena in her backyard. Josh later develops a crush on Maddie after he goes against her in the Cowbell competition, but instead ends up instantly falling in love with her and almost kisses her in "Secret-Admirer-a-Rooney", and they start dating in "Vive-la-Rooney" They finally go on their first date in "Home Run-a-Rooney", and Josh reveals one of the things he likes about Maddie is her competitive side. In "Scoop-a-Rooney", just as Maddie and Josh's relationship is growing, Liv is mistaken for Maddie when she and Josh are mistaken by Nancy O'Dell to be dating each other. Later, Diggie returns upon seeing the photos of Maddie with Josh, and Maddie and Josh break up in "Choose-a-Rooney" after Diggie sings how he feels about Maddie. Josh still loves Maddie, which is stated in "Friend-a-Rooney", causing him to lose his confidence and almost completely stop breathing. In "Ex-a-Rooney", he and Maddie manage to rekindle their friendship.

=== Dena ===
Dena (Jolie Jenkins) is the mother of Ruby, sister of Karen, and aunt of Liv, Maddie, Joey, and Parker.

=== Val ===
Val Wishart (Chloe East) is a girl who goes to BOOMS and is Parker's love interest.

In "Standup-a-Rooney", she and Parker go to prom and then to the Chemistry Challenge.

=== Finch ===
Finch (Amarr M. Wooten) is a student at BOOMS.

== Notable guest stars ==
=== Bernard ===
Bernard (Dwight Howard) is Joey's short-lived personal trainer who appears in "Dump-a-Rooney". He is apparently good at basketball and Maddie decides to pair with him instead of Pete in the two-on-two tournament. Pete feels pushed aside and pairs with Diggie instead. In turn, Maddie feels betrayed and apologizes to her father. Bernard eventually partners up with Diggie and the pair wins the tournament.

=== Fangs ===
Emmy "Fangs" Wulfert (Laura Marano) is a teenage "wolf girl" who was raised by wolves ever since she wandered away from her camp when she was little. She penned a book about her experience and still has some of her wolf traits. Fangs' appearance has her with dirty skin, dirty and ripped clothes, dirty and messy hair, fake claws on her fingers, and is always barefoot.

In "Howl-a-Rooney", she is invited to Stevens Point by Liv in an effort to teach her how to act like a wolf in preparation for Liv's audition for "Space Werewolves". She eventually helps Liv master her howling by competing for the role of Tristan Lycanth.

=== Q-Pop ===
Q-Pop (Kel Mitchell) is a hip-hop dance instructor who appears in "Howl-a-Rooney". Maddie and Diggie decide to try more adventurous things and choose to take up hip-hop dancing. When Joey expresses his own interest, Maddie tells him to take the class instead. Maddie soon feels left out and the three take lessons together.

=== Vic DeFazerelli ===
Vic DeFazerelli (Garry Marshall) is a three-time Oscar-winning director who appears in "Space-Werewolf-a-Rooney". He is hired to direct Liv in the "Space Werewolves" movie at a nearby studio in Wisconsin rather than Hollywood.

=== Kathy Kan ===
Kathy Kan (Piper Curda) is a Korean pop star who comes to Wisconsin to prepare for the Korean version of "Sing It Loud!". She appears in "Kathy Kan-a-Rooney", where she quickly becomes good friends with Liv.

=== Lacey ===
Lacey (Miranda May) is a basketball teammate of Maddie's, who appears in "Rate-a-Rooney", "Muffler-a-Rooney", "Frame-a-Rooney", and "Champ-a-Rooney". Her favorite animal is the starfish. She often starts to talk and then get off-topic.

=== Mr. Clodfelter ===
Mr. Clodfelter (Kevin James) is Maddie's Home Economics teacher who appears in "Cook-a-Rooney". When Maddie is failing Home Economics, she has to make it up for her grades. Mr. Clodfelter states that she can raise her grades if she can beat his top student Artie in a cooking competition. Eventually, Mr. Clodfelter passes Maddie when she creates a "Snackatorium". Later, Mr. Clodfelter is shown to pretend to have his own cooking show when not teaching his classes. He is nearly caught by Liv and Maddie when Maddie wants to show Liv the "Snackatorium". Due to Mr. Clodfelter having already eaten it, he and Liv show the imaginary viewers how to make it.

=== Krahgg ===
Craig "Krahgg" (Cameron Boyce) is Liv and Maddie's cousin, who appears in "Prom-a-Rooney". He is invited by Karen to the Ridgewood High prom because Maddie does not have anyone with whom to go to the prom. He is an illusionist who operates under the name "Krahgg the Insidious"; however, every magic trick he does fails.

=== Andy Grammer ===
Andy Grammer performs at the annual Stevens Point music festival in "SPARF-a-Rooney".

=== Cyd ===
Cyd (Landry Bender) appears in "Haunt-a-Rooney."

=== Shelby ===
Shelby (Lauren Taylor) appears in "Haunt-a-Rooney."

=== Grandma Janice ===
Grandma Janice (Patty Duke) is the twin sister of Hilary, the mother of Karen, the mother-in-law of Pete, and the grandmother of Liv, Maddie, Joey, and Parker. She appears in "Grandma-a-Rooney", where she has Hillary pose as her as she is running late. In her youth, Janice was a part of the U.S. Olympics Women's Diving Team. Another portion of Janice's life has her working as a globetrotting nature photographer where she has a lot of photographs of rhinoceroses. When Janice later encountered Joey in Willow's clutches during the viewing of a comet, Janice quoted that what Willow is doing to him is how she had met the man who became his grandfather.

=== Great Aunt Hilary ===
Great Aunt Hilary (Patty Duke) is the twin sister of Janice, the aunt of Karen, the aunt-in-law of Pete, and the great-aunt of Liv, Maddie, Joey, and Parker. She appears in "Grandma-a-Rooney", where she poses as Janice, who is running late.

=== Kristen Bell ===
Kristen Bell appears as herself in "Ask-Her-More-a-Rooney".

=== Brandon Crawford ===
Brandon Crawford appears as himself in "Home Run-a-Rooney".

=== Nancy O'Dell ===
Nancy O'Dell appears as herself and interviews Liv in "Scoop-a-Rooney", where she even asks if Liv is dating someone. She later mistakes Maddie for Liv when she sees her with Josh.

=== Jim Breuer ===
Jim Breuer appears as himself in "Big Break-a-Rooney".

== See also ==
- List of Liv and Maddie episodes
