= List of Liv and Maddie episodes =

Liv and Maddie is an American comedy television series created by John D. Beck and Ron Hart that premiered on Disney Channel on July 19, 2013. The series stars Dove Cameron, Joey Bragg, Tenzing Norgay Trainor, Kali Rocha, Benjamin King, and Lauren Lindsey Donzis.

A significant feature of the series is that Dove Cameron plays dual roles, one being Liv, an actress who has returned to her home after starring on a popular television series in Hollywood for four years, and the other one being Maddie, Liv's identical twin who remained behind. Another significant feature of the series are documentary-style cutaways where characters speak to the viewers to explain their opinions on various situations in each episode.

The series concluded after four seasons on March 24, 2017, with the episode "End-a-Rooney", which was also the eightieth episode.

== Series overview ==
Season	Episodes	Originally released	
Season	Episodes	First released	Last released
1	21	July 19, 2013	July 27, 2014
2	24	September 21, 2014	August 23, 2015
3	20	September 13, 2015	June 19, 2016
4	15	September 23, 2016	March 24, 2017

== Episodes ==
=== Season 1 (2013–14) ===
No. overall	No. in season	Title	Directed by	Written by	Original release date	Prod. code	U.S. viewers (millions)
1	1	"Twin-a-Rooney"	Andy Fickman	John D. Beck & Ron Hart	July 19, 2013	101	5.78
Liv Rooney has returned home from a four-year stint in Hollywood to the open arms of her parents, brothers, and twin sister Maddie. When Maddie confesses she has a crush on a boy named Diggie, Liv disguises herself as Maddie in an effort to win her a date to the upcoming dance. Unfortunately, Diggie says no. When Liv confesses that she asked Diggie to the dance, Maddie is upset and tells Liv that she wishes Liv had never left Hollywood. Liv prepares to leave, but her parents stop her, trying to show Liv that twins are special and she and Maddie will always be sisters. When Maddie is out practicing basketball, Diggie comes up to her and tells her he knew that it was Liv that asked him and that was why he said no, telling her that even though she and Liv have the same face, he knows Maddie. He then asks Maddie to the dance and she says yes. Meanwhile, Joey and Parker attempt to turn their shared bedroom into a bro-cave, but it backfires when Liv almost leaves. Liv gets emotional about a painting that she and Maddie made, and decides to stay. Guest stars: Ryan McCartan as Diggie, Shelby Wulfert as Maddie 2, Emmy Buckner as Liv 2
2	2	"Team-a-Rooney"	Andy Fickman	John D. Beck & Ron Hart	September 15, 2013	102	3.60
The school principal suddenly announces budget cuts just as Maddie is selected as captain of her basketball team, denying any chance of new uniforms or trips to tournaments. As soon as she voices her concern, Maddie discovers the lack of support from the team. In an effort to improve her leadership skills, Liv offers to join the team to help demonstrate Maddie's new-found abilities at a team retreat at the Rooney house. Meanwhile, Parker brings home a case of tarantulas from school, that have suddenly escaped, which causes a few problems for Maddie's team retreat, so he ropes in Joey for help. Guest stars: Larry Miller as Principal Fickman, Jessica Marie Garcia as Willow, Bridget Shergals as Stains, Amanda Misquez as Cassie, Emmy Buckner as Liv 2, Shelby Wulfert as Maddie 2
3	3	"Sleep-a-Rooney"	Andy Fickman	John Peaslee	September 22, 2013	107	3.00
Liv is concerned that she missed out in watching Parker grow up and has taken it upon herself to host a sleepover with his buddies, which is deemed unsuccessful. Knowing Maddie has a better relationship with Parker, Liv turns to her for help. Meanwhile, Pete takes Joey out to dinner in fear that he spends too much time playing video games. En route, Pete is pulled over by an officer friend who offers the pair a ride in the squad car. Additionally, Maddie and Willow build a guillotine for a school project. Guest stars: Jessica Marie Garcia as Willow, Carter Hastings as Evan, Zack Ward as Mike, Shelby Wulfert as Maddie 2, Emmy Buckner as Liv 2
4	4	"Steal-a-Rooney"	Andy Fickman	Heather MacGillvray & Linda Mathious	September 29, 2013	104	2.94
Maddie has gotten overly involved in her position as basketball team captain and Liv has taken notice and considers making new friends at school. When Liv finds out that Maddie has arranged for a fellow student to befriend her, she cuts school with a more troublesome student against Maddie's discretion and gets in trouble, but Maddie takes the blame. Meanwhile, Joey is given a state-of-the-art smartphone and takes on a position in the mall food court in an effort to pay the bill. Guest stars: Cozi Zuehlsdorff as Ocean, Samm Levine as Chambers, Anne Winters as Kylie, Emmy Buckner as Liv 2, Shelby Wulfert as Maddie 2
5	5	"Kang-a-Rooney"	Andy Fickman	Danielle Hoover & David Monahan	October 6, 2013	105	3.18
It is Halloween and Ridgewood High is hosting its annual Halloween Scream Fest. Maddie gets invited to join the couples costume contest by Diggie and the pair has difficulty reading into the outing. Joey is interested in the new girl at school and Maddie suggests that he practices talking to other girls before approaching his crush. Unbeknownst to him, the first girl he approaches is his sister, Liv, while in costume. Meanwhile, Parker discovers a clown doll that once belonged to Karen, who thought she had long disposed of. Guest star: Ryan McCartan as Diggie, Cozi Zuehlsdorff as Ocean, Gabrielle Elyse as Skyler, Shelby Wulfert as Maddie 2, Emmy Buckner as Liv 2
6	6	"Skate-a-Rooney"	Andy Fickman	John D. Beck & Ron Hart	October 13, 2013	103	2.91
Liv's boyfriend is a professional skateboarder and is in town to participate in a local competition, though Liv is asked to sit on the panel as a celebrity judge. Sadly, Liv receives a text from him wanting to break up and is intent on backing out of her judging position. Maddie, however, tells her that the best way to get over a breakup is to seek revenge. Meanwhile, Joey and Parker meet another skateboarder, The Masked Shredder, only to discover that he is really Skippy, a childhood friend of Joey's. Guest stars: Allen Alvarado as Skippy Ramirez, Connor Weil as Miller White, Kurt Long as Johnny Nimbus, Shelby Wulfert as Maddie 2, Emmy Buckner as Liv 2
7	7	"Dodge-a-Rooney"	Andy Fickman	Heather MacGillvray & Linda Mathious	November 3, 2013	108	3.32
Although working as the school psychologist, part of Karen's position at the school is to assign community service projects. Liv is not happy with the work assigned to her and decides to work at the senior citizen center with Maddie instead. Unfortunately, both twins are scheduled to work in the same room and the idea of playing dodge ball is suggested as a matter of settling who gets to use the room. Meanwhile, Joey gets in a pickle while standing guard over the school mascot and begs Parker for his help. Guest stars: Ryan McCartan as Diggie, Allen Alvarado as Skippy Ramirez, Dennis Cockrum as Baxter Fontanel, Jill Basey as Janet Budge, Emmy Buckner as Liv 2, Shelby Wulfert as Maddie 2
8	8	"Brain-a-Rooney"	Andy Fickman	Linda Mathious & Heather MacGillvray	November 10, 2013	113	3.01
Ridgewood High is hosting the annual Brain Olympics, and Joey is intent on forming a team with his frenemy Artie and another person in hopes of winning. Liv, in an effort to shed part of her girly image, convinces Joey to let her join the team. In competition, each team has to build a Rube Goldberg machine, but when Joey thinks she is not clever enough, Liv decides to build her own. Meanwhile, Maddie holds a yard sale to raise funds for the French Club's trip to Montreal, in which Karen (due to being a pack rat) tries to take back all the stuff. Willow accidentally sells a priceless childhood memory, but Karen manages to get it back. Guest stars: Jessica Marie Garcia as Willow, Jimmy Bellinger as Artie, Kurt Long as Johnny Nimbus, Shelby Wulfert as Maddie 2, Emmy Buckner as Liv 2 Absent: Tenzing Norgay Trainor as Parker Rooney
9	9	"Sweet 16-a-Rooney"	Andy Fickman	Sylvia Green	November 24, 2013	106	3.27
It is Liv and Maddie's sweet 16 and both girls have a difference in opinion on birthday party ideas. Karen has kept it secret that the girls were born on opposite sides of midnight and parties were hosted on Liv's birthday as she was born first. Liv decides to host a surprise party for Maddie at midnight and has roped in some of Maddie's closest friends to take her out for a friendly dinner, forcing Maddie to think the party was only for Liv. Although upset, Maddie returns home to a party commemorative of their youth. Guest stars: Ryan McCartan as Diggie, Jessica Marie Garcia as Willow, Bridget Shergalis as Stains, Emmy Buckner as Liv 2, Shelby Wulfert as Maddie 2
10	10	"Fa-La-La-a-Rooney"	Andy Fickman	Sylvia Green	December 1, 2013	111	3.11
The annual Stevens Point Holiday Spectacular is coming up and Liv is asked to host the televised event. When Liv discovers the little girl she is asked to perform with shares the same strong desire for the spotlight, trouble ensues. Additionally, Pete and Maddie are in charge of decorating the city's Christmas tree, but the power goes out amid Liv's performance. Meanwhile, Parker swindles money from Joey while dressed as Santa and an elf in order to purchase an expensive present he suspects no one will gift him. Guest stars: Kurt Long as Johnny Nimbus, Ella Anderson as Jenny Keene, Shelby Wulfert as Maddie 2, Emmy Buckner as Liv 2
11	11	"Switch-a-Rooney"	Andy Fickman	Danielle Hoover & David Monahan	January 17, 2014	109	3.18
A disheartened Maddie fails her driving test while a gleeful Liv is given the lead role in a film adaptation of a well-known science fiction novel, Space Werewolves. However, the boys are concerned that Liv is unsuitable for the role and Maddie agrees to take her place at a meet-and-greet in turn for Liv taking her driver's exam. Unfortunately for Liv, the driver's test goes awry when she is forced to wear Maddie's glasses, while Maddie stands up to a crazed fanatic: Artie. Meanwhile, Diggie tries to win Pete's approval. Guest stars: Ryan McCartan as Diggie, Jimmy Bellinger as Artie, Suzy Nakamura as Tammy, Shelby Wulfert as Maddie 2, Emmy Buckner as Liv 2
12	12	"Dump-a-Rooney"	Andy Fickman	John D. Beck & Ron Hart	January 26, 2014	110	2.63
Maddie and Pete sign up for a two-on-two tournament. However, Pete's skills are a bit rusty and Maddie fears losing. After meeting Joey's personal trainer, Bernard, Maddie leaves Pete for a more skilled teammate, who in turn finds a teammate in Diggie. Karen can see that Maddie and Pete's dissolution of their pairing was solely based on winning; the two apologize and team up again. Meanwhile, Liv earns the lead role in the school play of a career driven housewife, a characterization similar to Karen. Special guest star: Dwight Howard as Bernard Guest stars: Ryan McCartan as Diggie, Emmy Buckner as Liv 2, Shelby Wulfert as Maddie 2
13	13	"Move-a-Rooney"	Andy Fickman	Ernie Bustamante	February 9, 2014	112	2.72
Karen has just discovered how to video chat on her new phone and accidentally dials Liv and the children discover that the family is moving. Liv is saddened to leave her childhood home she has just returned to and fakes being sick to stay home while Maddie and Joey finally face their fears at school to tie up loose ends. Joey has a rocket race with Artie, Maddie attempts to open up her feelings about Diggie, and Parker starts filling in his secret escape tunnels. When they finally arrive home, Maddie and Diggie reveal their feelings and become a couple; then the kids find out they are simply moving into a hotel while the house is being tented for beetles, which causes trouble with Liv. Then they discover the troubles were brought on by Parker. Guest stars: Ryan McCartan as Diggie, Jimmy Bellinger as Artie, Emmy Buckner as Liv 2, Shelby Wulfert as Maddie 2
14	14	"Slump-a-Rooney"	Andy Fickman	John Peaslee	March 9, 2014	114	2.12
Maddie is helping Willow practice for varsity softball tryouts, but Willow is overwhelmed by her crush on Joey. Liv suggests sneaking in a love note from a secret admirer to distract Willow, but Willow believes it is from Joey. Meanwhile, Karen gets Liv an appearance on the local morning news program, but Liv accidentally mistakes permanent glue for makeup glue when trying on a costume for an upcoming role, so Liv improvises. Additionally, Parker helps Evan train for his blue belt in karate. Guest stars: Jessica Marie Garcia as Willow, Carter Hastings as Evan, Kurt Long as Johnny Nimbus, Elaine Kao as Sensei Rae Dawn, Emmy Buckner as Liv 2, Shelby Wulfert as Maddie 2
15	15	"Moms-a-Rooney"	Andy Fickman	Jenny Keene	March 16, 2014	115	2.42
When Liv discovers she was not invited to Karen and Maddie's mother–daughter weekend, she invites the actress who played her mother on Sing It Loud!, Bree, to help interrupt their outing. Suddenly, Liv is covered in leeches while wading in a lake, and when Bree runs away, this allows Karen to take care of her ailing daughter. Meanwhile, with the Rooney girls out of the house, Joey and Parker use the house to host tours of their famous sister Liv's living quarters. Surprisingly, Joey's arch-nemesis, Artie, is a fan of Liv's character and joins the tour. Guest stars: Jimmy Bellinger as Artie, Molly Hagan as Mrs. Wakefield, Dorie Barton as Bree, Shelby Wulfert as Maddie 2, Emmy Buckner as Liv 2
16	16	"Shoe-a-Rooney"	Andy Fickman	William Luke Schreiber	April 6, 2014	117	2.13
In order to help Maddie embrace her inner sparkle, Liv has Maddie try on the perfect pair of pumps. Maddie becomes addicted to the pumps, which has unintended consequences when her priorities begin to shift to the extreme. Meanwhile, Evan is staying with the Rooneys for the weekend and is forced to help Parker with the household chores, but the pair struggles to keep away from Karen's new wood-chopper. Additionally, Joey recruits Diggie to train him for the shuttle run in order to keep his perfect GPA. Guest stars: Ryan McCartan as Diggie, Jessica Marie Garcia as Willow, Bridget Shergalis as Stains, Carter Hastings as Evan, Shelby Wulfert as Maddie 2, Emmy Buckner as Liv 2
17	17	"Howl-a-Rooney"	Andy Fickman	Danielle Hoover & David Monahan	April 13, 2014	116	2.15
Liv is up for the lead role of a werewolf in the movie adaptation of a popular science fiction graphic novel and has invited a girl named "Fangs", the girl who wrote a book about being raised by wolves, to help develop her character. Fangs finds success with roughening up Liv, but struggles with teaching her to howl. Meanwhile, Maddie hopes for more alone time with Diggie. When Joey discovers that Diggie has signed them up for break-dancing lessons, Maddie suggests Joey attend them instead. Special guest star: Laura Marano as Fangs Guest stars: Ryan McCartan as Diggie, Kel Mitchell as Q-Pop, Fahim Anwar as Director, Emmy Buckner as Liv 2, Shelby Wulfert as Maddie 2
18	18	"Flashback-a-Rooney"	Andy Fickman	Sylvia Green	May 4, 2014	118	1.84
Maddie is anxiously awaiting the arrival of an invitation to the tryouts for the Junior Olympics' girls' basketball team. When the letter comes, Liv is worried about Maddie leaving her as she has just moved back home and hides the letter from her. A suspicious Maddie taunts Liv's feelings of guilt and Liv decides to give the letter to Maddie later that night. Prior to delivering the letter, Liv is comforted by the consideration of Maddie's feelings when Liv first left for Hollywood and both share the memories of that interaction. Meanwhile, Parker and Diggie track down Joey who secretly joined a drum playing club. Guest stars: Ryan McCartan as Diggie, Tate Chapman as young Liv, Abby Chapman as young Maddie, Emmy Buckner as Liv 2, Shelby Wulfert as Maddie 2
19	19	"BFF-a-Rooney"	Andy Fickman	Kali Rocha & Johnathan McClain	June 22, 2014	119	2.05
Liv is awaiting the arrival of her best friend and Sing It Loud! co-star, South Salamanca, and has prepared a get-together to introduce her to some local friends. When Maddie introduces Diggie to South, Maddie asks him to be cordial toward her, but misinterprets their friendliness as flirting. Meanwhile, it is Pete's 25th high school reunion and he has invited Karen to come with him. When Karen meets Pete's former flame, Karen fears that Pete settled on marrying her instead of high school sweetheart. Joey and Artie try to uncover a school secret but find out at the end it was a prank. Guest stars: Ryan McCartan as Diggie, Jimmy Bellinger as Artie, Raquel Castro as South Salamanca, Marla Maples as Amy Becker, Jenny Phagan as Amy Smalls, Shelby Wulfert as Maddie 2, Emmy Buckner as Liv 2
20	20	"Song-a-Rooney"	Andy Fickman	Teleplay by : Linda Mathious & Heather MacGillvray; Story by : Sylvia Green	June 29, 2014	120	1.97
Pete and Karen hire an agent to shoot a music video for Liv in an effort to promote her musicality. Unfortunately, the video becomes a sleeper hit only to boost the popularity of frozen yogurt. Meanwhile, Maddie gets a job at a local yogurt shop in an effort to spend more time with Diggie, the shop manager. Pete starts writing romantic sayings to Karen using one of Parker's baby plushies paying him for each saying until Karen finds out. Liv's agent wants her to perform the song at the yogurt shop, but Liv is unhappy with her image portrayed in the video and performs a different song she wrote using poems pulled from Maddie's journal as lyrics. Guest stars: Ryan McCartan as Diggie, Bridget Shergalis as Stains, Rena Strober as Becky Bicklehoff, Emmy Buckner as Liv 2, Shelby Wulfert as Maddie 2
21	21	"Space-Werewolf-a-Rooney"	Andy Fickman	John D. Beck & Ron Hart	July 27, 2014	121	N/A
Liv begins shooting for her new movie, Space Werewolves. After being rejected as a good Tristan Lycanth by a reporter, Liv says she will do her own stunts. Maddie's leg buckles while she does a winning shot and Maddie has to get knee surgery, effectively stopping her from playing basketball. Liv wants a stunt double, but does her own stunts to prove to Maddie that fear is just imagination. The trailer for Space Werewolves airs and Maddie stands up. Special guest star: Garry Marshall as Vic DeFazerelli Guest stars: Ryan McCartan as Diggie, Jessica Marie Garcia as Willow, Mim Drew as Whitney, Shelby Wulfert as Maddie 2, Emmy Buckner as Liv 2

=== Season 2 (2014–15) ===
No. overall	No. in season	Title	Directed by	Written by	Original release date	Prod. code	U.S. viewers (millions)
22	1	"Premiere-a-Rooney"	Shelley Jensen	John D. Beck & Ron Hart	September 21, 2014	201	2.04
It is time for the annual Wisconsin Cheddar Brat Cheese-Eating Contest. Liv, having not been there for four years, is excited to be participating in the cheese rolling contest with Maddie, who begins to recover from her knee injury. Right before the contest, Whitney, the assistant director of Space Werewolves, arrives and tells Liv that a competitor movie, Lunar Foxes, has moved its premiere to next weekend, which happens to be same night of Liv's premiere. Whitney thus moved the Space Werewolves premiere to that night. Liv gets packed, but remembers her promise to Maddie, who overhears Liv leaving and gets upset. While getting her phone, Liv's hair gets caught in the meat grinder and she has to cut her hair off as a result. She arrives at the contest and Maddie is soon banned from helping a blinded Liv, but she manages to beat Pete, much to Maddie's delight, and the twins reconcile. Meanwhile, Parker and Joey participate in the slippery sausage contest. When Parker learns that Joey cannot catch, he creates rings for Joey that are actually magnets and metal sausages. The episode ends with Liv using a foam crown to cover up the cut end of hair and the whole Rooney family, plus Johnny Nimbus, attend the Space Werewolves premiere. Guest stars: Ryan McCartan as Diggie, Kurt Long as Johnny Nimbus, Mim Drew as Whitney, Ron Pearson as Pretzel King, Shelby Wulfert as Maddie 2, Emmy Buckner as Liv 2
23	2	"Pottery-a-Rooney"	Shelley Jensen	John Peaslee	September 28, 2014	202	1.97
In order to occupy her spare time while recuperating from her knee injury, Maddie resumes an old interest in pottery, as well as other activities that don't go so well for her. With help from Reggie, Parker tries to convince his parents to let him get a dog, by building a series of robot dogs to prove he can be responsible enough to handle one. Guest stars: Jessica Marie Garcia as Willow, Bridget Shergalis as Stains, Herbie Jackson as Reggie, Emmy Buckner as Liv 2, Shelby Wulfert as Maddie 2
24	3	"Helgaween-a-Rooney"	Rich Correll	John D. Beck & Ron Hart	October 5, 2014	207	2.58
Liv comes up with a new theme for Scream Fest: brown. When Maddie finds out that Liv informed their entire school of the silly theme, she impulsively wishes she hadn't been born a twin. She soon finds her wish realized, though not in the way she'd intended. Liv and Maddie have a new sister and have become triplets with none other than Helga, a witch. Helga goes to Scream Fest and begins to cause trouble. Meanwhile, Parker and Joey use an amulet to clone themselves, but when Joey drops it in hummus, it tampers with the process and turns his clone into a moron. Maddie goes back to the house and wishes to be a twin again, yet the outcome is still unexpected; instead of getting rid of Helga, the wish gets rid of Liv. Joey and Parker fight with Maddie over which one of them gets to use the amulet to get rid of the clones, only for it to once again get dropped in hummus. Helga, who likes hummus, eats the amulet, much to Maddie's chagrin. Maddie wishes the family would go back to normal and she then wakes up realizing it was all just a dream. Karen had used hypnosis on Maddie with the amulet to make her fear of using her injured knee to shoot a three-pointer into a monster and the fear was named Helga. In the beginning, it seems like Maddie does not remember, yet at the end she does. Guest stars: Jessica Marie Garcia as Willow, Shelby Wulfert as Maddie 2, Emmy Buckner as Liv 2
25	4	"Kathy Kan-a-Rooney"	Linda Mendoza	Danielle Hoover & David Monahan	October 12, 2014	204	2.25
Liv quickly becomes friends with Kathy Kan, the actress portraying her in the Korean version of Sing It Loud!. Kathy and Liv put posters everywhere in the school because Kathy really likes pranks; however, this is happening while Karen might become the official vice principal, putting her career in danger. Kathy and Liv pull a major prank, gluing everything in Karen's office, and things quickly get out of hand when they find themselves trapped in the office due to Kathy gluing everything; luckily the two escape. Meanwhile, Parker is busted for watching a show called Linda and Heather. According to one of his friends, it is a show for girls, and his buddy humiliates him in front of his dojo buddies, but he soon finds out they all watch the show as well. In the end, Parker and his buddies watch Linda and Heather together and enjoy it. Joey hits an impossible shot to win a game of horse against Maddie, then promptly retires from all competition against her, infuriating her into tricking Joey into a game of filling in the periodic table which was a disguise for a tic-tac-toe board. Guest stars: Piper Curda as Kathy Kan, Herbie Jackson as Reggie, Shane Cambria as Splat, Tara Karsian as Mrs. Kneebauer, Emmy Buckner as Liv 2, Shelby Wulfert as Maddie 2 Absent: Benjamin King as Pete Rooney
26	5	"Match-a-Rooney"	Rich Correll	David Tolentino	November 2, 2014	205	1.87
In an upcoming school dance, Liv plays matchmaker when she tries to make Joey fall for Willow. She and Willow stage it by making her pretend to ask Artie instead of him, shocking them both, but Artie agrees, anyway. Everything goes along great until Willow forces Liv to ask Artie herself during the dance. When Artie reveals his plan of pretending to say yes to Willow in order for her to ask him out, Liv ends up impressed and Joey ends up with Willow, anyway. Meanwhile, Maddie fills in as the teacher for Parker's dojo class and goes a little overboard with her teachings. When she challenges Parker and Reggie to a fight, they stage a gruesome fight, causing Maddie to see the error of her ways. She makes it up by buying the entire class hot dogs. Guest stars: Jessica Marie Garcia as Willow, Jimmy Bellinger as Artie, Herbie Jackson as Reggie, Jaida-Iman Benjamin as Emily, Shelby Wulfert as Maddie 2, Emmy Buckner as Liv 2
27	6	"Hoops-a-Rooney"	Rich Correll	Sylvia Green	November 23, 2014	206	2.57
After successful fame in Space Werewolves, Liv gets offered a role in a basketball movie when her agent thinks that all of Maddie's MVP basketball awards belong to Liv. Liv has one day to prove she can play; however, Maddie is reluctant to help her prepare for the role and Liv is sidelined and considers dropping out of the spot. Willow persuades Maddie to help a struggling Liv and the two have to change the clumsy actress into a basketball pro. Meanwhile, Joey falls for Parker's lab partner. Guest stars: Jessica Marie Garcia as Willow, Rena Strober as Becky Bicklehoff, Brianne Ashleigh Tju as Alex, Emmy Buckner as Liv 2, Shelby Wulfert as Maddie 2
28	7	"New Year's Eve-a-Rooney"	Victor Gonzalez	John Peaslee	December 7, 2014	208	2.05
Johnny Nimbus and Liv prepare for the Stevens Point New Year's holiday on TV: Liv sells blow dryers she bought from Pete and Karen's credit cards; however, she bought 10,000 instead of 100 because that is what she thought she heard. As they go on, Johnny plays Liv's song, FroyoYOLO, which causes her fans to question her. One asks if she likes being a movie star, while another asks whether it is true that she kissed her sister's boyfriend, Diggie. Liv uses sarcasm and jazz hands, which makes Maddie, watching the TV channel, suspicious. Meanwhile, Parker and Joey try to finish all of their chores that Karen gave them so they can get a two-man swan paddle boat. Guest stars: Ryan McCartan as Diggie, Kurt Long as Johnny Nimbus, Emmy Buckner as Liv 2, Shelby Wulfert as Maddie 2
29	8	"Bro-Cave-a-Rooney"	Adam Weissman	Linda Mathious & Heather MacGillvray	January 18, 2015	203	2.57
Liv and Maddie must clean Joey and Parker's room after losing a bet. When one of Parker's chairs eats Maddie, Liv and Parker begin a search for her. Meanwhile, Pete and Karen plan to watch a movie called President Baby, but they fall asleep. Joey accidentally destroys Liv's diva board and tries to fix it with Pete and Karen's help. Liv finds Maddie at school and plans to prank Parker after they find out that Parker and Joey tricked them. Finally, Pete and Karen fix the diva board. Guest stars: Shelby Wulfert as Maddie 2, Emmy Buckner as Liv 2
30	9	"Upcycle-a-Rooney"	Chris Poulos	Linda Mathious & Heather MacGillvray	January 25, 2015	210	2.52
When Maddie loses her twin charm bracelet, Liv shames her for her carelessness. However, after Liv loses her matching charm necklace, she panics and has Andie create a copy using metal scraps. After Liv confesses that she lost her necklace, Maddie reveals that she stole it in order to make Liv understand how she felt. Meanwhile, Joey wants to show Parker he can be a cool brother. Maddie competes with Karen to get the most steps with their fitness watches, but Karen enlists the help of Parker to cheat. Guest stars: Victoria Moroles as Andie, Josh Swickard as Todd Stetson, Emmy Buckner as Liv 2, Shelby Wulfert as Maddie 2 Absent: Benjamin King as Pete Rooney
31	10	"Rate-a-Rooney"	Adam Weissman	Jennifer Keene	February 8, 2015	215	2.17
Todd and a group of guys rate the girls at school on how they look or dress and the girls feel like they need a change, so they change their appearance. Maddie does not like what the guys are doing and wants to put an end to the rates. Meanwhile, Pete wants to get rid of some junk in the house for his birthday, but Karen insists on keeping everything because she thinks it is useful. Elsewhere, Liv tries to create a new song and Maddie inspires Liv to write a song on how girls should be treated. Joey and Parker have a fight and separate their room into different sides. Guest stars: Jessica Marie Garcia as Willow, Miranda May as Lacey, Josh Swickard as Todd Stetson, Brianne Ashleigh Tju as Alex, Shelby Wulfert as Maddie 2, Emmy Buckner as Liv 2
32	11	"Detention-a-Rooney"	Jody Margolin Hahn	John Peaslee	February 15, 2015	209	2.53
To keep distance from mother–son bonding, Parker causes mischief in school and is assigned to detention with Mrs. Kneebauer. While in detention, he meets Dump Truck, an older student and detention regular who takes a liking to Parker. Liv and Maddie get sick and Pete must take care of both of them; they keep giving him a hard time. Meanwhile, Joey makes a bet with Artie and wins Artie's minions to use as his own, but soon regrets it as Artie's minions smother him with attention. Guest stars: Jimmy Bellinger as Artie, Tara Karsian as Mrs. Kneebauer, Shak Ghacha as Dump Truck, Shelby Wulfert as Maddie 2, Emmy Buckner as Liv 2
33	12	"Muffler-a-Rooney"	Victor Gonzalez	Sylvia Green	March 1, 2015	211	2.02
Liv agrees to another muffler commercial; however, only on the condition that her childhood friend, Shayna, is included. Maddie is cleared to play basketball again, but is worried that she will not be as good as before. Willow and Lacey convince Maddie to try and, as it turns out, she comes back even better. Joey tries to get a week with no physical education. Elsewhere, Karen gets obsessive with one of Parker's games. Troubles arise for Liv, however, when she suspects Shayna of stealing her lip gloss and phone, but when she ransacks her bag, Shayna accuses Liv of stealing her belongings. Pete arrives to tell them that "Liv" has been texting him and they find out that Moe stole them. Guest stars: Jessica Marie Garcia as Willow, Ariela Barer as Shayna, Miranda May as Lacey, Shelby Wulfert as Maddie 2, Emmy Buckner as Liv 2
34	13	"Gift-a-Rooney"	Adam Weissman	Kriss Turner Tower	March 8, 2015	212	2.02
Maddie and Diggie celebrate their anniversary together on FaceGab, parody of FaceTime, but Liv butts in. Liv gets another present for Maddie, but she rejects it and gets mad at her when she finds out the truth. Liv makes it up to her by letting Diggie come and visit Maddie. The two then decide to "pick up where they left off" by showing affection to each other with anniversary gifts and attempting to have a first kiss that is not on FaceGab. Meanwhile, Parker and his friend Reggie create a new cream for Karen, but it makes her hairy. Joey tries to resolve an issue between him and the school's lunch lady. Guest stars: Ryan McCartan as Diggie, Herbie Jackson as Reggie, Peggy Miley as Sylvia, Emmy Buckner as Liv 2, Shelby Wulfert as Maddie 2 Absent: Benjamin King as Pete Rooney
35	14	"Neighbors-a-Rooney"	Adam Weissman	Kali Rocha & Johnathan McClain	March 26, 2015	213	1.72
Karen's poem tree is ripped out of the ground by Cindy Dippledorf, which results in Liv and Karen teaming up to get revenge on her and her son, Holden, but they go too far when they steal a statue giraffe that was donated for Holden's uncle's wake. They find out this from Holden and try to return it, but get caught by Holden himself, who admits he didn't care. While returning the giraffe, Holden returns the pen he stole from Liv and said he stole it because he liked her, and Liv finds herself falling for him. They nearly kiss, but flee when Cindy comes. Meanwhile, Pete is restricted from eating meat by Karen and secretly eats chicken and ribs from fast food joints, but buries the evidence, which Parker and Maddie think are dinosaur bones. Liv and Holden also rekindle their friendship. Joey creates an Intergalactic Space Council. Guest stars: Jimmy Bellinger as Artie, Jordan Fisher as Holden, Audrey Whitby as Aubrey, Caryn Ward Ross as Cindy Dippledorf, Shelby Wulfert as Maddie 2, Emmy Buckner as Liv 2
36	15	"Repeat-a-Rooney"	Benjamin King	Marc C. Secada	April 9, 2015	214	1.65
During a Rooney family meeting, Liv finds that her childhood move to Hollywood caused her to miss some classes and is forced to repeat sixth grade, and attend class not only with Parker and his friends, but her hated teacher Mrs. Snodgrass. Parker invents a pair of glasses with a super computer for Karen, so she can keep track of the school records of all the kids. Due to a mishap at school which requires Joey to hold Maddie's varsity jacket, he ends up meeting a pretty girl who wants to go out with him because she thinks he's a jock. Guest stars: Herbie Jackson as Reggie, Carter Hastings as Evan, Miriam Flynn as Mrs. Snodgrass, Kara Royster as Kennedy, Emmy Buckner as Liv 2, Shelby Wulfert as Maddie 2
37	16	"Cook-a-Rooney"	Andy Fickman	Danielle Hoover & David Monahan	April 12, 2015	221	2.09
Maddie is failing home economics, and she has to win the cooking competition in order to remain on the basketball team. The only problem is that Maddie's rival is Artie, an amazing cook. Reggie asks Liv for advice about impressing an older girl, and Karen makes her think that the "older girl" is Liv herself. Meanwhile, Joey convinces Pete to become faculty advisor of multiple school clubs. Special guest star: Kevin James as Mr. Clodfelter Guest stars: Jimmy Bellinger as Artie, Herbie Jackson as Reggie, Shelby Wulfert as Maddie 2, Emmy Buckner as Liv 2
38	17	"Prom-a-Rooney"	Shannon Flynn	Heather MacGillvray & Linda Mathious	April 19, 2015	219	2.19
Holden now goes to Ridgewood after an incident with his boarding school. Liv introduces him to Andie. While they are working for the prom committee, Liv decides to ask Holden to prom, but before she can, Andie does. Meanwhile, Karen invites Maddie's cousin, Craig, to go to the prom with her, but soon realizes that he is a budding magician now and his name is Krahgg. At the prom, Liv performs a song about her affection toward Holden and how she lost it and looks at him and Andie dancing while she performs. Joey tries to use his swan boat but Parker makes him go with Willow. Guest stars: Cameron Boyce as Krahgg, Jessica Marie Garcia as Willow, Jordan Fisher as Holden, Victoria Moroles as Andie, Shelby Wulfert as Maddie 2, Emmy Buckner as Liv 2
39	18	"Flugelball-a-Rooney"	Adam Weissman	David Tolentino	May 3, 2015	216	2.04
Diggie returns from Tundrabania, but he and Maddie have trouble reconnecting. Joey tries to solidify his relationship with Diggie through the Tundrabanian sport of Flugelball. Meanwhile, Parker attempts to teach his new unlikely friend Dump Truck how to ride a bike. Diggie reveals that he has decided to go to Australia the following semester, leaving Maddie again. When Maddie tells Diggie that she is upset he didn't consider her feelings before committing to another semester abroad, Diggie gets defensive and breaks up with her. Guest stars: Ryan McCartan as Diggie, Shak Ghacha as Dump Truck, Emmy Buckner as Liv 2, Shelby Wulfert as Maddie 2
40	19	"Band-a-Rooney"	Jody Margolin Hahn	Danielle Hoover & David Monahan	June 14, 2015	220	2.08
After realizing she still has feelings for Holden, Liv decides to take part in the Battle of the Bands to still be able to hang out with Andie while avoiding Holden. However, the band falls apart without a lead guitarist and Andie gets Holden to take the spot, causing Liv to get nervous and behave strangely. She eventually decides not to take part in the Battle of the Bands, believing she cannot concentrate and perform well with Holden in the band. Meanwhile, Artie and Joey also make a band to compete, which later includes Karen playing the flute. Parker hosts the Battle of the Bands. Eventually, Maddie convinces Liv to play, and she rejoins her team as they compete and win the battle. Guest stars: Jessica Marie Garcia as Willow, Jimmy Bellinger as Artie, Kurt Long as Johnny Nimbus, Jordan Fisher as Holden, Victoria Moroles as Andie, Emmy Buckner as Liv 2, Shelby Wulfert as Maddie 2 Absent: Benjamin King as Pete Rooney
41	20	"Video-a-Rooney"	Andy Fickman	David Tolentino	June 21, 2015	223	2.13
After winning the Battle of the Bands, Liv, along with her new band The Dream, decides to make a music video with the help of Parker, who had just gotten a good camera. Parker looks for help to film the video and Diggie enthusiastically signs up after overhearing Maddie volunteer herself. Parker takes advantage of how much Diggie misses Maddie and tricks him into shooting the music video with him, even after Maddie had decided not to go. Meanwhile, the band falls apart, arguing over which idea to use for the new video. Liv stops the fighting after some time, showing them that they are better together and they decide on an idea to use together. Diggie eventually finds out Maddie had dropped out, becoming angry at Parker for tricking him, but the music video for The Dream was still shot successfully. Karen tries to teach Joey important life skills that he lacks, in order to prepare him for traveling by himself to attend college. Guest stars: Jessica Marie Garcia as Willow, Ryan McCartan as Diggie, Jimmy Bellinger as Artie, Jordan Fisher as Holden, Victoria Moroles as Andie, Audrey Whitby as Aubrey, Shelby Wulfert as Maddie 2, Emmy Buckner as Liv 2 Absent: Benjamin King as Pete Rooney
42	21	"Triangle-a-Rooney"	Andy Fickman	Eric Abrams	July 19, 2015	222	2.25
Andie tells Liv that she went on a date with Holden and had a great time. Holden, on the other hand, thought that he had a terrible time. Reggie and Parker get into a fight since they always have to do whatever Parker wants them to do. Reggie decides to play with Maddie instead. Later, Liv and Holden have a romantic moment when Willow busts in and stops them. The band gets a gig at the new show Nimbus at Night with Johnny Nimbus. Joey also interns at the show because it will look good on his college applications. Holden breaks up with Andie on the show when Johnny pressures him for the truth about their relationship. Holden and Liv then chase Andie when she runs off the stage. Willow ends up singing the ballad that Liv was to supposed to sing with Holden, along with Joey. Holden later comes to Liv's house to explain that he had always been in love with her, but Liv says that being with him means she will betray her friend and she can't date him at the moment. Reggie becomes Parker's friend again after he helps him beat Maddie in a game of basketball with rocket shoes, once he realized she was far more controlling than Parker. Guest stars: Jessica Marie Garcia as Willow, Jordan Fisher as Holden, Kurt Long as Johnny Nimbus, Victoria Moroles as Andie, Herbie Jackson as Reggie, Emmy Buckner as Liv 2, Shelby Wulfert as Maddie 2
43	22	"Frame-a-Rooney"	Jody Margolin Hahn	William Luke Schreiber	July 26, 2015	217	2.53
Ridgewood High's old mascot, the porcupine has been replaced with a new mascot called Ridgewood Butter. The students do not like the new mascot, and when it gets vandalized, the Rooneys become suspects because a beanie from a family ski trip was found on the crime scene. When Maddie refuses to reveal her alibi, as she was watching Diggie shoot hoops, Mrs. Kneebauer suspends her from the basketball game until she admits where she was. Maddie gives the beanie to Parker to examine after seeing a stain on it, and Parker finds out the stain is Swiss chocolate, which Artie eats before yodeling. Maddie reveals Artie was the person responsible before the game starts. Artie reveals that he wanted to get revenge on her for dumping his brother, Diggie. Diggie tells Artie that he actually dumped Maddie, and he didn't admit that Artie was his brother because Artie is embarrassing. Artie gets in trouble, and the mascot is changed back to Porcupines. Meanwhile, Parker creates an invention that accidentally destroys Karen's chair. He tries using glue to fix it, but he and Reggie end up getting glued to it. Guest stars: Ryan McCartan as Diggie, Jimmy Bellinger as Artie, Shak Ghacha as Dump Truck, Herbie Jackson as Reggie, Tara Karsian as Mrs. Kneebauer, Miranda May as Lacey, Shelby Wulfert as Maddie 2, Emmy Buckner as Liv 2
44	23	"SPARF-a-Rooney"	Andy Fickman	Danielle Hoover & David Monahan	August 16, 2015	303	1.90
It is time for SPARF (Stevens Point Awesome Rock Festival). Maddie and Andie bought tickets for SPARF with Diggie and Holden, respectively, while they were still together. Liv helps Andie get over her breakup with Holden by having a girls' weekend instead of going to SPARF, and it does not go as Liv originally planned. Both Maddie and Diggie want to go with each other, but their attempts to figure out how the other one feels backfires when Diggie is too vague, and Maddie decides to take Todd Stetson instead, irritating Diggie. Maddie is miserable with Todd at SPARF and the situation goes south when she bumps into Diggie, who took South Salamanca, Liv's friend from Hollywood as his date just to annoy Maddie. Meanwhile, Joey cannot set foot on the grounds of SPARF, so Parker comes up with a chair held by balloons in the air. This allows both of them to attend the music festival. Special guest star: Andy Grammer as himself Guest stars: Ryan McCartan as Diggie, Victoria Moroles as Andie, Josh Swickard as Todd Stetson, Raquel Castro as South Salamanca, Shelby Wulfert as Maddie 2, Emmy Buckner as Liv 2
45	24	"Champ-a-Rooney"	Andy Fickman	John D. Beck & Ron Hart	August 23, 2015	224	2.45
Maddie's basketball team wins the state championship, and Diggie still has feelings for Maddie and tries to tell her, but he is interrupted by the start of the parade through Stevens Point to celebrate the basketball team's victory. When Maddie finds out Diggie will not leave for Australia if she tells him she still likes him, she tries to reach him, but gets trapped in the girls' locker room. The season finale of Parker's favorite show airs, and he, Reggie, and Evan try to watch it. Joey loses Dump Truck's rabbit. In the end, Parker's show has a cliffhanger, and Maddie gets out of the locker room, but it is unknown if Diggie is still there. Guest stars: Ryan McCartan as Diggie, Jessica Marie Garcia as Willow, Kurt Long as Johnny Nimbus, Herbie Jackson as Reggie, Carter Hastings as Evan, Shak Ghacha as Dump Truck, Miranda May as Lacey, Emmy Buckner as Liv 2, Shelby Wulfert as Maddie 2

=== Season 3 (2015–16) ===
No. overall	No. in season	Title	Directed by	Written by	Original release date	Prod. code	U.S. viewers (millions)
46	1	"Continued-a-Rooney"	Andy Fickman	John Peaslee	September 13, 2015	301	1.80
Maddie comes to see Diggie, but he is nowhere to be found. Maddie and Joey later go to the airport and leave for L.A. as Diggie is supposed to be staying there for a short while before leaving for Australia. Liv decides to cover for Maddie in the meantime. After Parker's favorite show Linda and Heather ended on a cliffhanger he is desperate for drama, so he follows Liv around to entertain himself. When Karen and Pete question Maddie's absence, Parker lies by saying that Maddie is in the kitchen. Liv thus has to keep Karen and Pete away from the kitchen while pretending to be Maddie and being herself simultaneously. When Maddie and Joey go to L.A., Diggie appears at the Rooney's house and says that he has come back for Maddie. Maddie fails to find Diggie in L.A. and buys a ticket to Australia to meet him there. Meanwhile, Becky Bickelhoff arrives to tell Liv that she has landed the role in a new show called Voltage, but Liv declines because of how she missed her family the last time she left for four years. However, Becky later arrives to tell Liv that the people making the show will let her film it in Wisconsin, exposing Maddie's absence to Karen and Pete. Liv tells them the truth that Maddie left to catch Diggie in Australia; however, soon enough, Diggie arrives in L.A., and Maddie and Diggie have a romantic moment, though Joey ruins it. Maddie tells Diggie he should go to Australia and they agree to just stay friends for now; however, when he comes back, there is a chance they could become more than just that. In the end, Joey goes to bed angry because Karen and Pete were not angry at his absence. Guest stars: Ryan McCartan as Diggie, Rena Strober as Becky Bickelhoff, Frank Caliendo as Vince, Shelby Wulfert as Maddie 2, Emmy Buckner as Liv 2
47	2	"Voltage-a-Rooney"	Andy Fickman	John D. Beck & Ron Hart	September 13, 2015	302	1.70
Liv has landed the role of a lifetime on a new TV show called Voltage, which is about a girl who becomes a superhero after being struck by lightning and receiving superpowers. Meanwhile, Maddie is in charge of building a Paulie statue at Ridgewood, while Joey and Parker find out that Karen and Pete did not use their gift card to Goofy Gary's. Joey and Parker take advantage of this by using it. Meanwhile, Liv fails her promise to Maddie that she would help with the Paulie statue. When she gets home, she practices her character with Joey and Parker, but inadvertently destroys the Paulie statue in the process. Maddie quickly finds out, but instead of being mad at Liv, she reassures her sister that they can rebuild it and they stay up all night in order to do so. Meanwhile, Karen and Pete find out that Joey and Parker used the gift card, revealing that they do not even like the place. They plot their revenge by forcing the two to take them to a place they want to go. In the end, Liv finishes shooting a sneak peek of Voltage and the Rooney family watches it together and is amazed with Liv's performance. Joey and Parker use up money wrongly. Guest stars: Chloe Wepper as Gemma, Emmy Buckner as Liv 2, Shelby Wulfert as Maddie 2
48	3	"Co-Star-a-Rooney"	Adam Weissman	Linda Mathious & Heather MacGillvray	September 20, 2015	305	2.10
Liv gets notified by Gemma that the series is going to cast her love interest, and Liv convinces her to hold auditions for local talent from Stevens Point. Liv reads lines with the finalists, and she is shocked when Holden turns out to be one of them. Liv has to choose which boy gets the part: an actor, an annoying pest, or her true love. Meanwhile, Maddie goes through a forgetting Diggie ritual with her mother. Elsewhere Parker tries to create an unstainable shirt for Pete but pranks him with a catapult in the process. Guest stars: Jimmy Bellinger as Artie, Jordan Fisher as Holden, Chloe Wepper as Gemma, Lucas Adams as Josh, Shelby Wulfert as Maddie 2, Emmy Buckner as Liv 2 Absent: Joey Bragg as Joey Rooney
49	4	"Haunt-a-Rooney"	Adam Weissman	Danielle Hoover & David Monahan	October 4, 2015	306	2.09
Maddie and Willow host Senior Scare School, a Halloween tradition at Ridgewood High where the senior class scares students from Ridgewood Middle School. Maddie's inability to get scared is put to the test when Johnny Nimbus is killed by a falling portable toilet after swearing revenge on Maddie for pranking him during his coverage of the event and strange things start happening at the school. Meanwhile, Liv and Joey attend the Central Park Spooktacular to promote Voltage and things get awkward when Holden shows up. After a paparazzo takes a compromising picture of them together, Liv and Holden recruit Cyd and Shelby to help them delete it so Andie will not see it. Meanwhile, Karen and Pete get help from Evan to raise their Treat Beat rating and get more trick-or-treaters. Special guest stars: Landry Bender as Cyd, Lauren Taylor as Shelby Guest stars: Jessica Marie Garcia as Willow, Kurt Long as Johnny Nimbus, Herbie Jackson as Reggie, Jordan Fisher as Holden, Carter Hastings as Evan, Emmy Buckner as Liv 2, Shelby Wulfert as Maddie 2
50	5	"Cowbell-a-Rooney"	Adam Weissman	David Tolentino	October 18, 2015	304	2.57
Liv's co-star Josh seems to miss life in Hollywood, but reveals that he is more interested in activities in Stevens Point. The current activity in question turns out to be a school-wide substitution for a lack of sports activity called "Cowbell Week", where the students of Ridgewood High run around and throw cowbells around each other. After Maddie defeats Josh in the final round, the actor attends the victory party at the Rooney household and reveal his crush on Maddie to Liv, who is more excited over the news than one can possibly imagine. Meanwhile, Joey struggles to break his habit of wearing clothes with kittens, and seeks help from Parker. Guest stars: Jessica Marie Garcia as Willow, Victoria Moroles as Andie, Shak Ghacha as Dump Truck, Lucas Adams as Josh, Emmy Buckner as Liv 2, Shelby Wulfert as Maddie 2
51	6	"Grandma-a-Rooney"	Kevin C. Sullivan	Sylvia Green	October 25, 2015	218	1.81
Grandma Janice visits from Africa to present Liv with the Porcupine of the Year award, but Maddie gets suspicious when Grandma Janice does not treat her or Parker like she usually does. Maddie believes that Grandma Janice pulled a switch-a-roo with her twin sister, Great Aunt Hilary. Meanwhile, Joey invites three girls as dates to a party he and Artie are throwing. However, the girls eventually realize that they have been invited to the party by Joey and it all backfires when Artie betrays Joey and tries to steal Joey's dates. Special guest star: Patty Duke as Grandma Janice and Great Aunt Hillary Guest stars: Jessica Marie Garcia as Willow, Jimmy Bellinger as Artie, Brianne Ashleigh Tju as Alex, Audrey Whitby as Aubrey, Gatlin Green as Samantha, Emmy Buckner as Liv 2, Shelby Wulfert as Maddie 2
52	7	"Meatball-a-Rooney"	Kevin C. Sullivan	John Peaslee	November 8, 2015	307	2.10
While trying to get Liv to sign some Voltage junk to make money, Joey accidentally drops a bowling ball on Liv's foot and she breaks her toe. Joey then dedicates himself to being Liv's man-servant until she gets better. Joey tries really hard, but ends messing up several times. Meanwhile, Parker creates a meatball machine so he can avoid eating vegetables and is nervous about telling Reggie that he cannot make meatballs because he is not a genius. Meanwhile, Maddie and Willow hold a porcupine basketball camp for little girls. When Willow gets a scholarship to the university Maddie was dreaming of going to, Maddie gets jealous and accidentally blurts out a few hurtful words to Willow, which causes her to leave. This leads the little girls not to want to play basketball anymore because they think it tears apart friendships. Willow then overhears Maddie telling the children that she was wrong to be jealous of Willow and they make up. Parker invents a meatball machine that turns vegetables into meatballs for Reggie, but it turns out to be a fake. Later, Liv has become so desperate to be rid of Joey, she resorts to pulling off a very convincing imitation of Maddie to frighten him off. Maddie then shows up and comments that her Maddie has become so much better. Guest stars: Jessica Marie Garcia as Willow, Herbie Jackson as Reggie, Ashlyn Faith Williams as Lula, April Marshall-Miller as Anina, Shelby Wulfert as Maddie 2, Emmy Buckner as Liv 2 Absent: Benjamin King as Pete Rooney
53	8	"Ask-Her-More-a-Rooney"	Jody Margolin Hahn	Sylvia Green	November 22, 2015	308	2.11
Liv finds it strange when all her Voltage fans ask her about are her appearance, whereas they ask Josh about the work. Meanwhile, Joey and Dump Truck make a deal that Joey will be Dump Truck's assistant as a return favor for Dump Truck not reporting Joey for his overdue book. Later, Dump Truck is using Joey's locker to store something and tells Joey to stay away from it until further notice. Upon overhearing a phone call, Joey and Willow then get the idea that Dump Truck killed somebody and is storing their body in there. Elsewhere, Maddie also has an overdue book: Dribble Queen. If she fails to return it, she will not be able to go to college, so Parker, who knows where it is, helps her find it. However, Parker tells Maddie the book is supporting the main pillar support beam to both Parker Hollow and the Rooney house. Maddie, in disbelief, tries to take the book, which causes the whole house to shake. At the end, it turns out that Dump Truck was only storing salami in the locker for a salami eating contest to keep it from his friend, Tony Slim Nose; Liv and Kristen confront a reporter about female actors only being asked appearance questions; and Maddie swaps the book holding the support beam with her mother's Thai cookbook, but she and Parker later discover that Karen keeps their important documents in there. Special guest star: Kristen Bell as herself Guest stars: Jessica Marie Garcia as Willow, Shak Ghacha as Dump Truck, Lucas Adams as Josh, Jai Rodriguez as Jacob Michaels, Erin Matthews as Paula Porter, Bas Rutten as Uncle Martucci, Emmy Buckner as Liv 2, Shelby Wulfert as Maddie 2 Absent: Benjamin King as Pete Rooney
54	9	"Joy-to-a-Rooney"	Jody Margolin Hahn	William Luke Schreiber	December 6, 2015	309	1.53
Parker accidentally gives his coupon book gift to Joey instead of Karen. Joey takes advantage of it and has Parker perform many of the tasks written on the coupons. Liv discovers that Karen's special Christmas Eve dinners were nothing more than takeout food. Liv is now forced to ask Artie for help, to which he happily agrees if Liv will do a photo shoot with him. Unfortunately, Liv has no choice but to agree. Later, Liv invites Gemma and her crew to the dinner because they were busy working with Voltage rather than spending time with their families. Meanwhile, Maddie pranks Willow by giving her a present with coal in it, but Willow takes it to heart. Later, Maddie and Willow accidentally wrap the coal in one of the presents Santa will be handing out. Shortly after, when Willow performs that same trick on Johnny Nimbus that Maddie performed on her, she understands why it was funny. Maddie then ends up inviting Johnny Nimbus to dinner and they, the rest of the people, and the Rooneys all enjoy a nice Christmas dinner. Guest stars: Jessica Marie Garcia as Willow, Jimmie Bellinger as Artie, Kurt Long as Johnny Nimbus, Chloe Wepper as Gemma, Shelby Wulfert as Maddie 2, Emmy Buckner as Liv 2
55	10	"Ridgewood-a-Rooney"	Jody Margolin Hahn	Sylvia Green	January 17, 2016	310	2.28
Parker moves to Ridgewood High School, and Maddie and Joey get jealous that he is becoming the best at everything. Liv, Willow, and Andie are trying to give the best gift to the school on behalf of the senior class of 2016. Karen tells Maddie and Joey that Parker is having difficulty fitting in. In the end, Maddie lets Parker score the winning goal so he will survive high school, and Liv provides a new water fountain for the school to replace a malfunctioning one. Guest stars: Jessica Marie Garcia as Willow, Jimmy Bellinger as Artie, Victoria Moroles as Andie, Emmy Buckner as Liv 2, Shelby Wulfert as Maddie 2
56	11	"Coach-a-Rooney"	Leonard R. Garner Jr.	Jennifer Keene	January 24, 2016	311	1.87
Maddie has trouble dealing with her new basketball coach when it turns out to be her sixth grade teacher, Mrs. Snodgrass. She presents strange methods that seem to be unrelated to basketball. Meanwhile, Liv and Holden finally become a couple and get ready to go on their first date together. However, Parker's art project intervenes when Liv gets herself stuck in plaster before her date with Holden. Holden thinks she is avoiding him before finding out the truth, and they have a low-key first date at Liv's house. Guest stars: Jessica Marie Garcia as Willow, Victoria Moroles as Andie, Jordan Fisher as Holden, Bridget Shergalis as Stains, Miriam Flynn as Mrs. Snodgrass, Hudson Yang as Frankie Chang, Shelby Wulfert as Maddie 2, Emmy Buckner as Liv 2
57	12	"Secret-Admirer-a-Rooney"	Chris Poulos	Linda Mathious & Heather MacGillvray	February 21, 2016	312	1.81
Liv encourages Josh to pursue Maddie. Josh makes an excuse to spend time with Maddie by claiming that he needs her to teach him how to play basketball for a fake scene of Voltage, but Maddie soon finds out Liv's role and is mad at her for interfering in her love life. However, after Maddie and Josh almost kiss, she starts to fall for him. Meanwhile, Parker and Joey think the Voltage set is haunted and set out to catch the 'ghost' with Gemma and Johnny Nimbus. It turns out that the "ghost" is Karen, who has been stealing Gemma's special cheesecake from L.A. Guest stars: Kurt Long as Johnny Nimbus, Chloe Wepper as Gemma, Lucas Adams as Josh, Emmy Buckner as Liv 2, Shelby Wulfert as Maddie 2 Absent: Benjamin King as Pete Rooney
58	13	"Vive-la-Rooney"	Dave Cove	Kali Rocha & Johnathan McClain	March 13, 2016	313	1.93
Pete comes back home and while they are up on the tree house Maddie asks his advice about whether she is ready to start dating again or not. He tells her that she will know when she is ready. Later Josh comes over and asks Pete what to do about a girl he likes, Maddie, and Pete tells him to do something she likes doing so Josh goes up on the tree house even if he is scared of heights. In the end he and Maddie start dating. Meanwhile, Liv has an interview in French so Karen helps her to remember the French she used to speak as a baby. Guest stars: Lucas Adams as Josh, Brianne Ashleigh Tju as Alex, Shelby Wulfert as Maddie 2, Emmy Buckner as Liv 2
59	14	"Dream-a-Rooney"	Adam Weissman	David Tolentino	March 20, 2016	314	1.77
Karen needs help saving the music group at Ridgewood High, so the Dream gets back together to perform. Willow ends up blurting out the truth behind what sparked Liv and Holden's relationship and Andie gets really upset. Meanwhile, Maddie is trying to pick a college and becomes even more conflicted after she is offered a basketball scholarship to a university in Beloit where her dad has become a college basketball coach. Joey and Parker, on the other hand, try to beat Artie at the Paws on a Porcupine game. Guest stars: Jessica Marie Garcia as Willow, Jimmy Bellinger as Artie, Victoria Moroles as Andie, Jordan Fisher as Holden, Audrey Whitby as Aubrey, Emmy Buckner as Liv 2, Shelby Wulfert as Maddie 2
60	15	"Home Run-a-Rooney"	Leonard R. Garner Jr.	Freddie Gutierrez	April 10, 2016	315	1.76
Maddie is nervous about going on her first date with her new boyfriend, Josh and asks Joey for help. Meanwhile, Liv and Holden help Parker pass show choir. On their first date, Josh and Maddie are really happy until she catches a home run ball by his favorite player, Brandon Crawford, upsetting Josh when he wanted to catch it and not Maddie. Maddie realizes how upset Josh is so takes him back to where they had their first date - the Stevens Point stadium - where they meet baseball legend, Brandon Crawford, who is also revealed to be a big fan of Josh's show, Voltage. Maddie and Josh talk, he confesses one of the reasons he likes her - because of her competitive side - the two share their first hug and make up. Special guest star: Brandon Crawford as himself Guest stars: Jordan Fisher as Holden, Lucas Adams as Josh, Wesley Mann as Mr. Bell, Mike Greenberg as Radio Announcer, Shelby Wulfert as Maddie 2, Emmy Buckner as Liv 2 Absent: Benjamin King as Pete Rooney
61	16	"Scoop-a-Rooney"	Wendy Faraone	Danielle Hoover & David Monahan	April 24, 2016	316	1.73
Joey makes Josh and Holden compete to be his new best friend, since Diggie is gone. At an arcade, Nancy O'Dell mistakes Maddie without her glasses for Liv when she is on a date with her boyfriend, Josh, and erroneously says that Liv and Josh are dating. Holden is upset that Liv doesn't want to make their relationship public, so Liv attempts to clear it up, but Maddie asks her to wait until she tells Diggie first. Liv and Holden break up because Holden feels that Liv has too much going on in her life to commit to their relationship. Parker, Dump Truck, and Evan enter a smoothie drinking contest, and win thanks to Evan. In the end, Diggie returns and tells Maddie he knows it was her on the date with Josh, and he says he is going to win her back. Guest stars: Ryan McCartan as Diggie, Jordan Fisher as Holden, Lucas Adams as Josh, Carter Hastings as Evan, Shak Ghacha as Dump Truck, David Shatraw as Goofy Gary, Nancy O'Dell as herself, Emmy Buckner as Liv 2, Shelby Wulfert as Maddie 2
62	17	"Choose-a-Rooney"	Leonard R. Garner Jr.	Betsy Sullenger	May 8, 2016	317	1.65
At the Voltage set, Johnny proposes to Gemma and enlists Liv to plan the wedding in under a week. Maddie, is having trouble after Diggie returns, while she is with Josh. At the wedding, Liv and Artie plan for Maddie and Diggie to get back together. Diggie sings an acoustic excerpt from "As Long as I Have You". Josh realizes Maddie still likes Diggie, is totally devastated and she apologizes for breaking his heart. Josh says he will be okay, but really struggles to let Maddie go, leaving him completely heartbroken, so much that he almost cries, hinting his feelings for her are more than they seem to be. Parker invents a jacket with thermal and cooler pockets for the food, and ransacks the buffet. After Joey punctures the suit with a Cake Pop, the two get caught. Hungry, Karen reveals that her purse has "Parker Pockets" as well. In the end, Maddie and Diggie get back together. Guest stars: Ryan McCartan as Diggie, Jimmy Bellinger as Artie, Kurt Long as Johnny Nimbus, Lucas Adams as Josh, Chloe Wepper as Gemma, Shelby Wulfert as Maddie 2, Emmy Buckner as Liv 2
63	18	"Friend-a-Rooney"	Leonard R. Garner Jr.	Linda Mathious & Heather MacGillvray	May 22, 2016	318	1.32
When Andie's father disapproves of her dating Dump Truck, they team up with Karen to try to change her father's mind, which eventually works. Meanwhile, Josh is really struggling with his break up with Maddie, which causes him to lose his confidence, especially with his acting as he is having to deal with a huge heartbreak from losing her. It goes as far as Josh not remembering how to do stuff, including how to breathe, showing he still loves Maddie. Guest stars: Erik Estrada as Mr. Bustamante, Victoria Moroles as Andie, Lucas Adams as Josh, Carter Hastings as Evan, Shak Ghacha as Dump Truck, Chloe Wepper as Gemma, Emmy Buckner as Liv 2, Shelby Wulfert as Maddie 2
64	19	"Skyvolt-a-Rooney"	Adam Weissman	Sylvia Green & David Tolentino	June 5, 2016	319	1.96
Liv and Maddie are graduating high school. Liv still wants to stay with Maddie in Stevens Point, but she learns that Voltage is moving to Los Angeles for season two. Gemma forces her to make a decision. Meanwhile, Willow is also leaving for college in California, and at the last minute Joey realizes he liked her the whole time. He is saddened they were never high school sweethearts. He goes to school just before she leaves and does everything high school sweethearts would do in just five minutes. They go on dates and he fights over her. They then have a prom, but Willow has to leave. She comes back to finish dancing with Joey and kisses him before she departs. After, Liv decides to stay in Stevens Point and go to college with Maddie, giving up Voltage for her. The season finale reveals that Josh will be the new SkyVolt, but later Maddie receives a call from Willow saying that Southern California State University wants her to play basketball there and are offering her a scholarship. She decides to go but faces the challenge of telling Liv. Guest stars: Jessica Marie Garcia as Willow, Ryan McCartan as Diggie, Jimmy Bellinger as Artie, Lucas Adams as Josh, Chloe Wepper as Gemma, Aaron Hendry as Zaydock, Shelby Wulfert as Maddie 2, Emmy Buckner as Liv 2
65	20	"Californi-a-Rooney"	Adam Weissman	John D. Beck & Ron Hart	June 19, 2016	320	1.53
Maddie tells Liv about Southern California State University's offer and also that she accepted. Liv gets mad at her because she gave up Voltage so they could spend the next four years together. Maddie leaves without saying goodbye to Liv and Karen sends Joey up to talk Liv; however, she refuses to make up with her. Liv begins to clear Maddie's stuff out of her room as Maddie goes through a scrapbook given to her by Aunt Dena. The two end up in tears and Liv regrets not saying goodbye to Maddie. Liv then flies to California and makes up with Maddie. Meanwhile, Karen discovers that Parker never sealed his tunnels as promised, but begins to like the little area under the kitchen and starts to hide out there, much to Parker and Joey's dismay. In retaliation, the two seal the tunnels; however, Joey swaps the book holding up the entire house with Karen's yoga ball, which pops and their house caves in. The Rooney family then moves in with Aunt Dena. Guest stars: Jessica Marie Garcia as Willow, Jolie Jenkins as Aunt Dena, Emmy Buckner as Liv 2, Shelby Wulfert as Maddie 2

=== Season 4: Cali Style (2016–17) ===
- Lauren Lindsey Donzis joins the cast as Ruby, the daughter of Aunt Dena and cousin of Liv, Maddie, Joey and Parker; she takes the place of Benjamin King (Pete Rooney), who does not appear in this season.

No. overall	No. in season	Title	Directed by	Written by	Original release date	Prod. code	U.S. viewers (millions)
66	1	"Sorta Sisters-a-Rooney"	Andy Fickman	John D. Beck & Ron Hart	September 23, 2016	401	1.66
As the Rooney family gets settled living their new lives in California, Aunt Dena's daughter Ruby comes home from a summer safari trip with Grandma Janice and meets the visiting Rooney family. She starts bonding with her twin cousins, whom she thinks of as "sorta sisters". With Ruby and the twins sharing a bedroom, Liv becomes bothered by a velvet portrait of Diggie that Maddie has hung on the wall and wants Ruby to destroy it. Upon hearing from Maddie how much Diggie means to her, Ruby finds herself unable to harm the portrait but winds up accidentally ruining Liv and Maddie's "sisters by chance" artwork. Maddie easily patches it up and tells Ruby to keep the incident a secret. The twins eventually find out each other's ploys because Ruby becomes distressed over keeping any secrets from her two cousins. Meanwhile, Joey and Parker begin attending the Boyle and Oppenheimer Official Magnet School—BOOMS. Joey fears not fitting in from his first day and takes on the persona of "Falcon", suggested by Ruby. Parker struggles to fit in after his classmates give him a hard time, but Joey, as Falcon, tells the students to give Parker a chance and suddenly becomes the "cool" one at the school. Guest stars: Oscar Nuñez as Mr. Beelick, Jolie Jenkins as Dena, Chloe East as Val, Amarr M. Wooten as Finch, Shelby Wulfert as Maddie 2, Emmy Buckner as Liv 2
67	2	"Linda & Heather-a-Rooney"	Adam Weissman	Linda Mathious & Heather MacGillvray	September 30, 2016	402	1.36
After Voltage, it has been difficult for Liv to land an acting role, but her manager Becky secures her a guest spot on Linda and Heather. That makes Parker ecstatic, so he attends the show's set with Liv and gets to meet the two lead stars. When Liv's character on the show is left to decide something concerning Linda and Heather, the two leads get into an argument and ultimately quit. With the show's future on the line, Becky comes up with a plan to save it, involving both Liv and Parker; the plan works as the two leads make up. As the publicity of Liv's saving Linda and Heather improves her image, Becky delivers news that Liv will be reprising her role from Sing It Loud! in an update called Sing It Louder!!. Meanwhile, Joey and Willow have broken up, but Karen hears two different stories about how that happened, leading her to get the two together to set the details straight. Also, in attempting to teach her cousin the pain of losing, Maddie becomes frustrated over Ruby's constantly winning against her in various games. Guest stars: Emmy Buckner as Linda, Shelby Wulfert as Heather, Jessica Marie Garcia as Willow, Rena Strober as Becky Bickelhoff
68	3	"Scare-a-Rooney"	Wendy Faraone	David Tolentino	October 14, 2016	403	1.51
Joey and Parker learn the hard way when the kids at BOOMS don't celebrate Halloween and decide to prank the kids. After Aunt Dena leaves for a convention, Liv and Ruby leave for the Demon’s Dungeon, but Liv bumps into a former actor she worked with on Voltage, and she discovers that her decision to quit the show ruined his career. Guest stars: Jolie Jenkins as Dena, Aaron Hendry as Henry, Chloe East as Val, Amarr M. Wooten as Finch, Shelby Wulfert as Maddie 2, Emmy Buckner as Liv 2
69	4	"Sing It Louder!!-a-Rooney"	Adam Weissman	John Peaslee	November 18, 2016	404	1.12
Gemma has become the director of Sing It Louder!! but tells Liv the show will not get off the ground unless the crew can find an actress to play the lead character, Sasha. Liv discovers that Ruby is potentially good for the part after hearing her cousin rehearse lines, and she suggests Ruby audition for it. The pressure mounts when Gemma is expecting Ruby to nail her audition, after all the other applicants for the role have failed. This makes Ruby anxious and she backs out, but Liv realizes Ruby is more worried about disappointing her than for the show itself. After Liv assures Ruby that she need not worry about disappointing her, Ruby tries out and lands the role of Sasha. Meanwhile, Maddie panics after spilling liquids on her laptop, having finished an important school paper on it, while Parker seeks proper credit for his work at BOOMS with Joey's popularity getting in the way. Guest stars: Chloe Wepper as Gemma, Jolie Jenkins as Dena, Amarr M. Wooten as Finch, Emmy Buckner as Liv 2, Shelby Wulfert as Maddie 2
70	5	"Slumber Party-a-Rooney"	Kevin C. Sullivan	Danielle Hoover & David Monahan	November 25, 2016	405	1.24
Joey's reputation as Falcon may go downhill when he bumps into the old cool kid, Skeeter. Meanwhile, Liv decides to have a slumber party so Ruby and Priya would become friends when something goes wrong on set. Parker returns to his old ways when he builds Parker Tunnels in Aunt Dena's. Guest stars: Chloe Wepper as Gemma, Amarr M. Wooten as Finch, Laya Deleon Hayes as Priya, J.J. Totah as Skeeter, Shelby Wulfert as Maddie 2, Emmy Buckner as Liv 2
71	6	"Cali Christmas-a-Rooney"	Andy Fickman	Sylvia Green	December 2, 2016	411	1.09
It's Christmas in California soon and Wisconsin's Christmas is lacking in Maddie so Liv does everything to recreate their old Christmas, even inviting Diggie. Joey participates in a Santa Claus contest hosted by Johnny Nimbus. Guest stars: Ryan McCartan as Diggie, Kurt Long as Johnny Nimbus, Josh Swickard as Todd Stetson, Shelby Wulfert as Maddie 2, Emmy Buckner as Liv 2
72	7	"Standup-a-Rooney"	Chris Poulos	Betsy Sullenger	January 6, 2017	406	1.42
Parker is unsure if he asked Val to be his science partner for a chemistry competition or to a dance that are on the same night. Joey tries out stand-up comedy and fails at first but succeeds his second time with Maddie's help. Karen learns that Aunt Dena took Liv to get her ears pierced while she was younger and their friendship is strained. Guest stars: Jolie Jenkins as Dena, Chloe East as Val, Emmy Buckner as Liv 2, Shelby Wulfert as Maddie 2
73	8	"Roll Model-a-Rooney"	Leonard R. Garner Jr.	Jennifer Keene	January 13, 2017	407	1.05
A classic toy car race scene from Sing It Loud! is planned to be recreated in Sing It Louder!!, and Liv tries to convince Zach that the girls should win the race this time and break the stereotype that girls can't like cars. Zach agrees that whoever wins the competition in real life can win it in the episode of Sing It Louder!! When Zach gives the girls a high-heeled shoe with wheels on it as a car, Liv explains to Ruby and Priya that they should not be afraid to do whatever they like. They refuse to accept the shoe car and, with the help of Liv, build their own car. The girls win the competition and teach everyone a lesson about unfair stereotypes. Meanwhile, Maddie and Willow are determined to break a gender barrier of their own when they compete to become the first women to successfully eat spicy peppers at a restaurant. Guest stars: Jessica Marie Garcia as Willow, Laya Deleon Hayes as Priya, Evan Todd as Zach, Darren Bluestone as Schnoop, Shelby Wulfert as Maddie 2, Emmy Buckner as Liv 2
74	9	"Falcon-a-Rooney"	Leonard R. Garner Jr.	William Luke Schreiber	January 20, 2017	408	1.23
Skeeter brings Artie to California to reveal the secrets from Joey's embarrassing past in high school after Skeeter's previous failed attempt, but Joey owns up to it and comes to school as himself instead of Falcon next day, and the other students at BOOMS just end up liking him even more for that. Guest stars: Jimmy Bellinger as Artie, Amarr M. Wooten as Finch, Chloe East as Val, JJ Totah as Skeeter, Emmy Buckner as Liv 2, Shelby Wulfert as Maddie 2
75	10	"Ex-a-Rooney"	Dave Cove	Linda Mathious & Heather MacGillvray	January 27, 2017	409	1.21
Josh returns and has been making action movies with Joey who, in turn, has been trying to keep Josh and Maddie apart due to Josh allegedly not dealing with the break-up well, but they run into each other again when Maddie returns home early from a canceled practice. Maddie and Josh are able to rekindle their friendship, but Joey feels awkward by it and asks Liv to pretend to be Maddie in order to stop Maddie and Josh from spending time together. In the process, Joey tells Liv to stop playing with Josh's emotions again, but Maddie catches Liv pretending to be her and forces her to go to a game with her. Meanwhile, Parker and Val compete to be one of the first humans on Mars in a competition called Mars Madness at BOOMS, but Parker accidentally sets the temperature to 42 degrees Celsius instead of 24, which results in Val's growth serum evaporating and turning Parker's plant into a giant, and they end up having to kill it together. Guest stars: Lucas Adams as Josh, Chloe East as Val, Shelby Wulfert as Maddie 2, Emmy Buckner as Liv 2 Absent: Lauren Lindsey Donzis as Ruby
76	11	"Tiny House-a-Rooney"	John D. Beck	Kali Rocha & Johnathan McClain	February 17, 2017	410	1.01
Karen is giving a chance to do modeling but, Liv thinks the offer is a scam. Meanwhile, Maddie and Willow learn that a guitarist friend is homeless and, with Val's help, decide to build a tiny house for him. Guest stars: Jessica Marie Garcia as Willow, Chloe East as Val, August Roads as Eddy, Zoe Perry as Marlowe, Ashlee Füss as Daria, Ego Nwodim as Ms. Karsch, Emmy Buckner as Liv 2, Shelby Wulfert as Maddie 2 Absent: Lauren Lindsey Donzis as Ruby
77	12	"Big Break-a-Rooney"	Wendy Faraone	Sonja Warfield	February 24, 2017	414	0.92
Parker does a series of tests on the twins to see who's smarter in IQ. Meanwhile, Joey tries to get his stand-up comedy off the ground. Guest stars: Jim Breuer as himself, Mitch Rouse as Mickey, Emmy Buckner as Liv 2, Shelby Wulfert as Maddie 2 Absent: Kali Rocha as Karen Rooney
78	13	"Sing It Live!!!-a-Rooney"	Paul Hoen	John Peaslee	March 3, 2017	412	1.00
When Gemma learns that her special guest for Sing it Live!!!, is stuck in New York, Liv has to sing in fear of losing her singing voice. After she sings her solo, she tells Maddie that she needs to go to the hospital immediately and the episode ends as the screen says to be continued. Guest stars: Kurt Long as Johnny Nimbus, Chloe Wepper as Gemma, Laya Deleon Hayes as Priya, Emmy Buckner as Liv 2, Shelby Wulfert as Maddie 2
79	14	"Voice-a-Rooney"	Andy Fickman	Ron Hart	March 17, 2017	413	0.97
A few weeks after the events of Sing it Live-a-Rooney, Liv is given a chance to be on Broadway but is not sure if she wants to know if she can sing. Maddie brings back The Dream to help. Meanwhile, Parker and Val are in the finals for Mars Madness, but find out their competition might lead victory down a slope. Guest stars: Laura Bell Bundy as Tracy Okahatchee, Jessica Marie Garcia as Willow, Jimmy Bellinger as Artie, Victoria Moroles as Andie, Jordan Fisher as Holden, Carter Hastings as Evan, Chloe East as Val, Ego Nwodim as Ms. Karsch, Shelby Wulfert as Maddie 2, Emmy Buckner as Liv 2 Absent: Lauren Lindsey Donzis as Ruby
80	15	"End-a-Rooney"	Andy Fickman	Danielle Hoover & David Monahan	March 24, 2017	415	1.30
The Rooney family plans to spend the summer together before they all have to go their separate ways. However, Joey receives the opportunity to tour with a famous stand-up comedian. The next week, Maddie gets the grant to build tiny houses, but has to fly to New Orleans the next day. Liv's manager Becky reveals that she has been cast in a broadway musical set to take place over the summer, and Parker also has to leave early for the bio-dome, which has been moved to Bolivia. The kids tearfully break the news to Karen, who admits that she is proud of her children and encourages them to follow their dreams. The Rooneys elect to spend one final "night of Rooney" together, and they gather around a campfire with their friends and share secrets. The episode ends with Liv singing an acoustic rendition of the show's theme song (with Diggie playing along on the guitar) and sharing a tearful embrace with her sister. Meanwhile, Joey reveals to Dump Truck that the Rooneys have been followed around by a camera crew for the past four years to film a reality series entitled "Bits & Pieces" that airs exclusively in Luxembourg, which has served as the framing device for the show. Guest stars: Jessica Marie Garcia as Willow, Ryan McCartan as Diggie, Shak Ghacha as Dump Truck, Chloe East as Val, Jolie Jenkins as Dena, Rena Strober as Becky Bickelhoff, Shelby Wulfert as Maddie 2, Emmy Buckner as Liv 2

== See also ==
- List of Liv and Maddie characters
