= Father of the Year =

Father of the Year may refer to:

- American Father of the Year award, award by American Diabetes Association
- Australian Father of the Year award
- "Father of the Year", a 1970 episode of The Brady Bunch
- Father of the Year (film), a 2018 comedy film
