= Jessica Marie Garcia =

American actress

- Born: March 23, 1987 (age 39); Orlando, Florida, U.S.
- Occupation: Actress
- Years active: 1999, 2010–present
- Spouse: Adam Celorier (m. 2018)
- Children: 1

Jessica Marie Garcia (born March 23, 1987) is an American actress. She made her acting debut as Sierra on the drama series Huge (2010), and subsequently played Becky on the sitcom The Middle (2012–2014). Her breakthrough came with playing Willow Cruz on the Disney Channel series Liv and Maddie (2013–2017), and she achieved mainstream success portraying Rhonda Navarro on the thriller series How to Get Away with Murder (2018–2019). She has received acclaim for starring as Jasmine Flores on the Netflix series On My Block (2018–2021), which earned her a Teen Choice Award nomination.

== Early life ==
Garcia was born on March 23, 1987, in Orlando, Florida. Garcia's father is of Mexican descent, while her mother is of Cuban descent. At the age of 19, Garcia moved to Los Angeles. Before pursuing acting, she worked at Olive Garden and a restaurant called The Counter, a job she continued while appearing on the show Liv and Maddie.

== Career ==
Garcia began acting in 2010, making her professional debut starring as Sierra, a recurring role, on the ABC Family drama series Huge, and in the same year starred as Lucero in the independent film Las Angeles. Following this, from 2012 to 2014, she starred as Becky in the ABC sitcom The Middle. During her appearances on The Middle, Garcia began appearing on the Disney Channel series Liv and Maddie as Willow Cruz, a role she played until 2017. Despite her character being a teenager, Jessica was 26 years old when the show began and 30 years old when it wrapped up. In 2017, she starred as Peaches in the film Avenge the Crows.

From 2015 to 2019, Garcia starred in and co-wrote episodes for the comedy sketch show Betch. In 2018, Garcia began appearing in the Netflix drama series On My Block as Jasmine Flores. Originally cast in a recurring role, Garcia was promoted to a series regular from the second season. For her performance, she was nominated for Choice Summer TV Actress at the 2019 Teen Choice Awards. In the same year, she portrayed Rhonda Navarro on the thriller series How to Get Away with Murder, a role she held until 2019. In 2020, Garcia began appearing in the Disney+ series Diary of a Future President as Camila.

== Personal life ==
In 2013, Garcia discovered that she was pre-diabetic, and to prevent getting diabetes, she lost over 70 pounds, stating that her career was her "biggest motivation to start living a healthier life."

In January 2016, Garcia became engaged to actor Adam Celorier, whom she married two years later in October 2018. She announced her first pregnancy in November 2021, and their daughter, Selena Grey, was born in February 2022.

== Filmography ==
=== Film ===
Year	Title	Role	Notes	Ref.
2010	Los Angeles	Lucero	Film	
2017	Avenge the Crows	Peaches	Film	
2020	How to Get $100 Million	Hope	Short film	

=== Television ===
Year	Title	Role	Notes	Ref.
2010	Huge	Sierra	Recurring role; 5 episodes	
2012	County	Vicky Santos	Television film	
2012–2014	The Middle	Becky	Recurring role; 11 episodes	
2013–2017	Liv and Maddie	Willow Cruz	Recurring role; 36 episodes	
2015–2019	Betch	Various	Also co-writer	
2016	Casual	Marta	Episode: "Phase 3"	
2017–2018	Hacking High School	Becca	Recurring role; 4 episodes	
2018–2021	On My Block	Jasmine Flores	Recurring (season 1); main role (season 2–4)	
2018	Goliath	Ana	Episode: "Alo"	
2018	Starter Pack	Penley	Recurring role; 4 episodes	
2018–2019	How to Get Away with Murder	Rhonda Navarro	Recurring role; 5 episodes	
2019	American Princess	Nurse Paloma	Recurring role; 2 episodes	
2019	The Filth	Kevin	Episode: "Filthy Bro Day"	
2020–2021	Diary of a Future President	Camilla	Recurring role; 11 episodes	
2023	Erin & Aaron	Jaxxon	Episode: "Should I Stay or Should I Go"	
2025	The Thundermans: Undercover	Brenda	Episode: "No Friend in Sight"	

== Awards and nominations ==
Year	Award	Category	Work	Result	Ref.
2019	Teen Choice Awards	Choice Summer TV Actress	On My Block	Nominated	
