= Call Your Mother (TV series) =

American sitcom television series on ABC

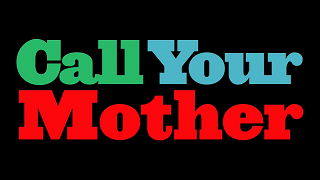
- Genre: Sitcom; Family comedy
- Created by: Kari Lizer
- Starring: Kyra Sedgwick; Joey Bragg; Rachel Sennott; Austin Crute; Emma Caymares; Patrick Brammall
- Music by: Matt Cartsonis
- Country of origin: United States
- Original language: English
- No. of seasons: 1
- No. of episodes: 13

Production
- Executive producers: Kari Lizer; Tim Kaiser; Pamela Fryman
- Producers: Nicole Sun; Steve Sandoval
- Cinematography: Gregg Heschong; Gary Baum
- Editor: Pat Barnett
- Camera setup: Multi-camera
- Running time: 21 minutes
- Production companies: Kari's Logo Here; ABC Signature; Sony Pictures Television Studios

Original release
- Network: ABC
- Release: January 13 – May 19, 2021

Call Your Mother is an American television multi-camera sitcom created by Kari Lizer that aired from January 13 to May 19, 2021 on ABC. In May 2021, the series was canceled.

== Premise ==
The series follows an empty nest mother, who decides to be close to her children by moving cross country from Waterloo, Iowa to Los Angeles, California in order to be with them, much to their chagrin.

== Cast ==
=== Main ===
- Kyra Sedgwick as Jean Raines, a retired teacher and empty nest mother who reinserts herself into her children's lives
- Joey Bragg as Freddie Raines, Jean's 23-year-old son and a video game designer and tester
- Rachel Sennott as Jackie Raines, Jean's 25-year-old daughter and her eldest child
- Austin Crute as Lane, Jackie's gay best friend and roommate
- Emma Caymares as Celia, Freddie's fiancée who's a social media influencer
- Patrick Brammall as Danny, a therapist and Jean's Airbnb host

=== Recurring ===
- Sherri Shepherd as Sharon, Jean's best friend who works as a security guard at Ross Dress for Less
- Jackie Seiden as Cheryl, Danny's estranged wife

== Episodes ==
No.	Title	Directed by	Written by	Original release date	U.S viewers (millions)
1	"Pilot"	Pamela Fryman	Kari Lizer	January 13, 2021	3.38
Lonely after the death of her husband several years prior, Jean flies out to Los Angeles on her own to reconnect with her two big children, Freddie and Jackie. Both have built successful lives for themselves, barely speak to each other anymore, and resent their mother's neediness, feeling that she should focus on her own life. Danny, Jean's host, tells her that she is clinging to her children out of fear that she might lose them as well. Jean is attracted to him and they nearly kiss before Jackie and Freddie, feeling sorry, come back to make things right with their mother. Encouraged by this, Jean decides to stay in L.A. for as long as they need her to.
2	"Distressed Jean"	Pamela Fryman	Kari Lizer	January 20, 2021	2.45
Freddie's girlfriend Celia takes Jean out for brunch, then promptly abandons her, leaving a confused Jean to wander off until she finds her way into an elementary school. There, she meets a fellow teacher, Amy, who correctly deduces that Jean needs a job. She hires Jean to work as a counselor for her new college counseling business. Returning home, Jean is shocked to find that her children have been worried sick about their mother's disappearance; both promise to spend more time with her. Jean also meets Danny's ex-wife Cheryl, who takes an instant dislike to her. She and Danny agree that the latter needs to sort out his own life before they can think about starting a relationship.
3	"Quaran-Jean"	Lynda Tarryk	Annie Levine & Jonathan Emerson	January 27, 2021	2.56
Jean's close relationship with Freddie drives a wedge between both her and Jackie and her son and Celia; Jackie feels that her mother is never there for her while Celia is upset that Freddie turned to his mother instead of her when he needed help with a splinter in his hand. The two eventually decide to trade emergency contact numbers after unexpectedly bonding. Jean finally tells her daughter that if she wants her to be there, she needs to get better at communicating it. In the aftermath of a small earthquake that forces Jean to temporarily move in with Jackie, both she and Danny deny to their friends that they have feelings for each other.
4	"New Car, New Job, New Jean"	Pamela Fryman	Matt Goldman	February 3, 2021	2.48
While starting her new job as a counselor, Jean invites her children over for dinner; this soon spirals into her taking care of all their needs while neglecting her job responsibilities, which upsets Amy. Danny warns Jean that she is "regressing" and trying to be a mother again which her children are eagerly taking advantage of. Lane intervenes and tells Jackie and Freddie what their sense of entitlement is doing to Jean, while Jean has a nervous breakdown at work in front of a client. Jackie and Freddie finally agree to stop leaning so heavily on their mother and pitch in to help buy her a car, and Jean receives a small commendation at work for her first successful placement.
5	"Dating Jean"	Pamela Fryman	Nicole Sun	February 10, 2021	2.20
Tired of waiting for Danny, Jean takes advice from Jackie and goes out on a date with a man she meets at a farmers' market. Danny is bothered by this, but Jean brushes him off. Although Jean has a good time, her date's freegan beliefs convince her not to take things any further. Lane starts a relationship with a man named Victor when Jackie helps him move on from a years-old bad breakup; however, he chooses not to be aloof and distant as she tells him to be. Freddie becomes concerned that Celia finds him boring, but Celia assures him that, having lived an adventurous life, she loves Freddie because he offers her the chance to finally settle down.
6	"Sunday Dinner"	Pamela Fryman	Lauren Tyler	February 24, 2021	2.85
Jackie introduces her much older boyfriend, Hank, at a family dinner, where he and Jean quickly discover they have much in common. Jackie then confesses she's wanted to break up with Hank for months but can't because of how Jean taught her never to end a relationship. Celia is convinced Jean dislikes her, and when Freddie questions his mother, she admits that Celia's lifestyle and personality are the complete opposite of the person she wants her son dating. In response, Freddie proposes to Celia, and Jackie finally makes up her mind to not only break up with Hank but quit her unsatisfying job at his firm. Jean and Danny kiss again despite the former refusing to accept she has any romantic interest.
7	"Feelings"	Gail Lerner	Allan Rice	March 3, 2021	2.39
Jean and Danny's relationship grows complicated emontionally and physically as they try to resit their feelings for one another until his divorce is final. As Celia is moving to Freddie's apartment Freddie is disappointed to learn that Celia plans to keep her place as a backup plan, causing some hard conversations between the two.
8	"California Jeanin'"	Kelly Park	Amy Iglow	March 24, 2021	2.26
Sharon visits Jean for her birthday. Freddie and Jackie compete with each other to give their mother the best gift, while Danny struggles with finding something as he knows nothing about what Jean likes. During a spa treatment, Sharon's rude behavior offends Jean; in turn, Sharon is mad that Jean thinks she's a hick, and they have a falling-out in their relationship. Jackie shows up Freddie at the party by sharing how much Jean has changed her life, which causes Sharon to run out crying. She admits her fear that Jean will never return to Iowa, but Jean tells her that doesn't mean their friendship is over. Inspired, Sharon decides to move to L.A. for a month until her own birthday.
9	"One Bad Mother"	Pamela Fryman	Tommy Johnigan	March 31, 2021	2.29
Lane is dreading an upcoming visit from his judgmental mother; Jean volunteers to help him entertain her. Jackie temporarily moves in with Freddie and Celia. Freddie is nervous because he recently got a big job offer and is afraid Jackie won't take it well given her failure to find a new job. Lane's mother, convinced Jean is trying to take her place, tries to drive her away from her son, but Lane sets the record straight and he and his mother part on amicable terms. Freddie turns down the job offer, and finds that Celia wanted him gone so she could have her own work space. They agree to share their home instead. Danny is shocked to find Sharon has a habit of falling asleep in his bed - while he's in it.
10	"The Prime of Miss Jean Raines"	Pamela Fryman	Teleplay by : Allyson Philobos and Heather McNama & Nancy Nyman; Story by : Allyson Philobos	April 14, 2021	2.67
While planning a trip to Las Vegas with Sharon, Jean becomes self-conscious of her age, especially when she learns that Danny is a decade younger than her. Jackie, desperate for some direction in her life, approaches an old high school classmate, Nick, so she can ask him for a sperm donation to get pregnant. Freddie and Celia have an argument over whether they should have kids and Freddie runs to Jean's house, forcing Celia to come and pick him up after reminding him that a successful relationship isn't without its problems. After discussing things with her mother, Jackie agrees to go out on a date with Nick. Jean gets her self-confidence back after Danny tells her that their age gap doesn't bother him.
11	"Save the Date"	Pamela Fryman	Jessica Charles	April 21, 2021	1.88
With Danny's divorce finalized, he and Jean go on their first real date, which ends poorly when Jean realizes that today happens to be her wedding anniversary. Freddie convinces Jackie to let him have their mother's engagement ring so he can give it to Celia; when Lane points out that Freddie essentially tricked her, Jackie decides she wants the ring. Jean then tells them neither is getting the ring; she intends to keep it forever as she is unable to let go of the memory of her late husband Mike. After Sharon reminds her of the futility of living in the past, Jean finally accepts her feelings for Danny and they become an official couple.
12	"The Raines Games"	Pamela Fryman	Tommy Johnagin & Nicole Sun	May 12, 2021	2.11
13	"Jean There, Done That"	Pamela Fryman	Annie Levine & Jonathan Emerson & Allan Rice	May 19, 2021	2.02

== Production ==
=== Development ===
The series was first ordered as a pilot by ABC in September 2019 and was one of many projects that Lizer had under her deal with Sony. On January 23, 2020, the series was given the working title My Village. On March 6, 2020, it was announced that Pamela Fryman would direct the pilot. The series was green-lighted by ABC on May 21, 2020 and was re-titled as Call Your Mother. On June 17, 2020, it was announced that the series would premiere in the fall of 2020 and air on Wednesdays at 9:30 P.M. However, the next day, it was announced that it will switch places with Black-ish, and will instead premiere midseason. The series premiered on January 13, 2021. On May 14, 2021, ABC canceled the series after one season.

=== Casting ===
On March 2, 2020, it was announced that Kyra Sedgwick had joined the pilot and would portray as Jean Raines. The same month, Rachel Sennott was cast in the role of Jackie Raines, while Joey Bragg, Emma Caymares and Austin Crute were cast as Freddie Raines, Celia and Lane, respectively. Upon series order announcement, Patrick Brammall joined the main cast as Danny. On September 28, 2020, Sherri Shepherd was cast in a recurring role. On December 14, 2020, Jackie Seiden joined the cast in a recurring capacity.

=== Filming ===
Call Your Mother was filmed at Sony Pictures Studios in Culver City, California, but it is set in Los Angeles, California.

== Reception ==
=== Critical response ===
On Rotten Tomatoes, the series holds an approval rating of 9% based on 11 reviews, with an average rating of 4/10. On Metacritic, the series has a weighted average score of 44 out of 100 based on 8 critics, indicating "mixed or average reviews".

=== Ratings ===
Viewership and ratings per episode of Call Your Mother
No.	Title	Air date	Rating (18–49)	Viewers (millions)	DVR (18–49)	DVR viewers (millions)	Total (18–49)	Total viewers (millions)
1	"Pilot"	January 13, 2021	0.5	3.38	0.3	1.70	0.8	5.08
2	"Distressed Jean"	January 20, 2021	0.4	2.45	—N/a	—N/a	—N/a	—N/a
3	"Quaran-Jean"	January 27, 2021	0.4	2.56	—N/a	—N/a	—N/a	—N/a
4	"New Car, New Job, New Jean"	February 3, 2021	0.4	2.48	—N/a	—N/a	—N/a	—N/a
5	"Dating Jean"	February 10, 2021	0.3	2.20	—N/a	1.04	—N/a	3.24
6	"Sunday Dinner"	February 24, 2021	0.5	2.85	—N/a	—N/a	—N/a	—N/a
7	"Feelings"	March 3, 2021	0.4	2.39	—N/a	1.11	—N/a	3.50
8	"California Jeanin'"	March 24, 2021	0.3	2.26	—N/a	—N/a	—N/a	—N/a
9	"One Bad Mother"	March 31, 2021	0.3	2.29	—N/a	—N/a	—N/a	—N/a
10	"The Prime of Miss Jean Raines"	April 14, 2021	0.4	2.67	0.1	0.92	0.5	3.59
11	"Save the Date"	April 21, 2021	0.3	1.88	0.2	0.88	0.5	2.76
12	"The Raines Games"	May 12, 2021	0.3	2.11	0.2	0.84	0.5	2.95
13	"Jean There, Done That"	May 19, 2021	0.4	2.02	0.1	0.72	0.5	2.75
