= Father of the Year (film) =

2018 film by Tyler Spindel

- Film poster
- Directed by: Tyler Spindel
- Written by: Brandon Cournoyer; Tyler Spindel
- Produced by: Allen Covert
- Starring: David Spade; Nat Faxon; Joey Bragg; Matt Shively; Bridgit Mendler
- Cinematography: Brad Shield
- Edited by: J.J. Titone; Jason Gourson
- Music by: Elmo Weber
- Production company: Happy Madison Productions
- Distributed by: Netflix
- Release date: July 20, 2018 (United States)
- Running time: 94 minutes
- Country: United States
- Language: English

Father of the Year is a 2018 American comedy film directed by Tyler Spindel (in his feature length directorial debut). The film stars David Spade, Nat Faxon, Joey Bragg, Matt Shively and Bridgit Mendler in her final film role.

When a debate between two college graduates about whose father would win in a fight is taken seriously by their dads, jobs are lost, relationships ruined, and best friends come of age as they come to grips with the identity of their fathers.

The film was released on July 20, 2018 by Netflix. It was panned by critics.

== Plot ==
Ben O'Malley and Larry Fischer return to their hometown in New Hampshire before heading together to NYC, where Ben's internship in a recycling company is due to start in a few weeks. Arriving first to Ben's father Wayne's, he is both a widower and unemployed, who spends most of his time drunk.

The two friends head to a local bar and connect with school friends. Ben comes across Meredith Parker, who he had briefly been with as kids. He tries to get her number, but he is unsuccessful.

A debate between Ben and Larry arises about whose father would win in a fight, Wayne or Mardy. Eventually Wayne takes it seriously. When he goes over to beat Mardy up, he runs, while Ben and Larry try to stop him. Wayne falls off the roof, destroying the next door neighbor Ruth's greenhouse. He and Ben spend the night in jail for it.

By the morning, ISG Energy Systems catches wind of the incident, cancelling Ben's internship. Going to Ruth's, she will only drop the charges if the greenhouse is replaced with a pool. So, Ben goes to the local hardware store to get supplies to dig one. Unbeknownst to him, it is Meredith's father's hardware store. When Ben sees her, he hides, as he does not want her to know what happened.

When Larry gets home, his family sets up an intervention. As he has no definite plan after finishing his degree and they are not convinced of his idea to tag along with Ben to NYC, Mardy insists he come work with him in the pharmaceutical testing lab. As they are paying volunteers to test a nipple cream, Wayne turns up for the $40. Mardy gets nervous, until Larry convinces he will not recognize him as he is sober.

Wayne has an allergic reaction, and the tissue swells, temporarily giving him breasts. Eventually, the swelling goes down, but after getting his drink on, he is back to threatening Mardy. Mardy's response is to hide out in a motel. He tells his family an impromptu conference has come up, so they do not miss him.

Wayne guilts Ben into taking his dead mother's place to compete with him in the Deerfield Wife Carrying competition. They win, so they have a meal together. Meanwhile, Larry finds Mardy, who left his diazepam at home, so his friend Trey hooks him up with molly. Not wanting him to trip alone, Larry takes some too. As they are tripping, the friend tries to hide them in the basement.

As an earlier failed attempt to kiss Meredith while skinny dipping failed, as something scared them out of the water, Ben tries to sneak them into prom. However, the teacher taking tickets at the door recognizes her from four years ago as coming drunk, so refuses to let them in. They dance outside the venue together, and Ben successfully uses a move on Meredith that Wayne taught him to get her to kiss him.

Larry joins the Marines, then decides to offer sex to Ruth so she will drop the charges against Ben for the greenhouse. In addition, Wayne gets Mardy to pull some strings to get him another interview for the internship by offering to let him beat him up in front of Larry.

Wayne insists on tagging along to NYC, so the CEO conducts the interview remotely using virtual reality goggles and animal avatars. Ben is about to be given the job, but the CEO messes with Wayne, so he changes his mind about wanting it. Ben goes home, announcing to Meredith that he is staying.

At Larry's going away party, his half-brother accuses his dad of lying about beating up Wayne. Mardy admits it, but then challenges him on the spot. They run at each other, and both fall flat on their backs.

== Cast ==
- David Spade as Wayne, Ben's dimwitted unemployed father
- Nat Faxon as Mardy, Larry's scientist father
- Joey Bragg as Ben, Wayne's son who is a recent college graduate and Larry's best friend
- Matt Shively as Larry, Mardy's son and Ben's best friend
- Bridgit Mendler as Meredith, Ben's love interest
- Jackie Sandler as Krystal, Mardy's wife, Larry's stepmother, and Aiden's mother
- Mary Gillis as Ruth Franklin, Larry's neighbor
- Jared Sandler as Nathan, Ben's and Larry's friend
- Bill Kottkamp as PJ, Ben's and Larry's friend
- Camille Clark as Caryssa, the hot townie
- Kevin Nealon as Peter Francis, CEO of ISG Energy
- Peyton Russ as Aiden, Krystal's son, Mardy's stepson, and Larry's stepbrother
- Moses Storm as Trey, Larry's drug dealer
- Melanie Hutsell as Trey's mom
- Dean Winters as Geoff, a neighbor who runs in the "wife carrying race"
- Ashley Spillers as Olivia, Mardy's lab assistant
- Remington Keyes as Karate Instructor

== Production ==
In July 2017, it was announced that David Spade, Nat Faxon, Bridgit Mendler, Joey Bragg, Matt Shively, and Jackie Sandler would star in Who Do You Think Would Win? for Netflix. The film was eventually re-titled Graduates and then later Father of the Year.

Principal photography took place in Boston and Hamilton (a suburb just under an hour from Boston) in June 2017. Additional footage was gathered during multiple days of filming at Brandeis University in Waltham, Massachusetts.

== Release ==
The film was released on July 20, 2018. It had previously been scheduled for release on June 29, 2018.

== Reception ==
Rotten Tomatoes gives Father of The Year an approval rating of 0%, based on 11 film critic reviews.
