= Joey Bragg =

American actor and comedian (born 1996)

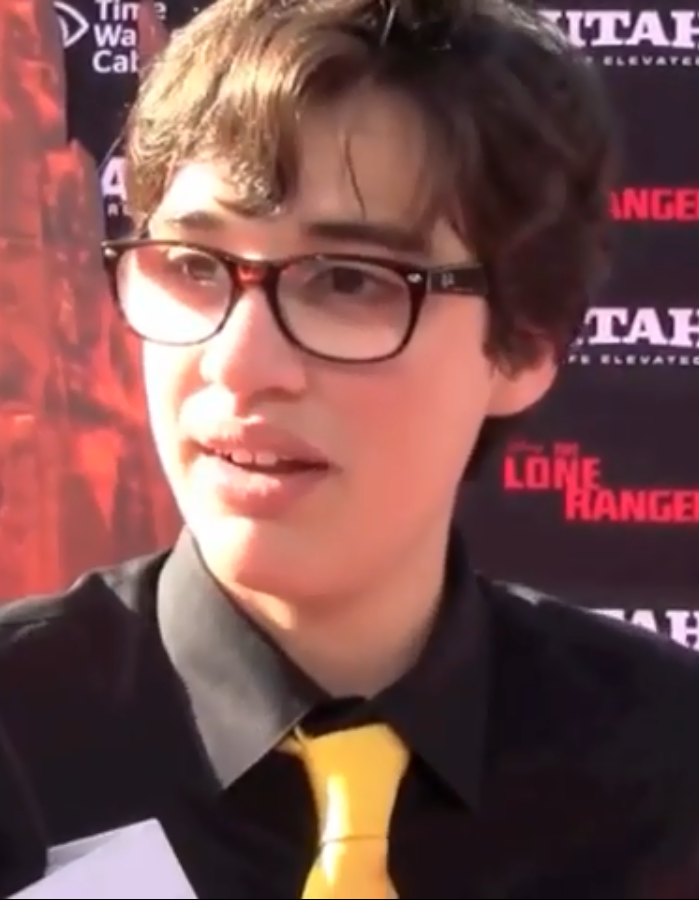
- Bragg in 2013
- Born: Joseph Franklin Bragg; July 20, 1996 (age 30); Union City, California, U.S.
- Education: James Logan High School
- Occupations: Actor; comedian
- Years active: 2012–present

Joseph Franklin Bragg (born July 20, 1996) is an American actor and comedian. He is best known for his role as Joey Rooney in the Disney Channel sitcom Liv and Maddie (2013–2017).

== Early life and education ==
Bragg was born Joseph Franklin Bragg on July 20, 1996 in Union City, California to Melanie and Ken Bragg. He has one brother named Jack. He went to James Logan High School and graduated in 2014. He is Jewish.

== Career ==
Bragg has a successful stand-up comedy career. He made his feature film debut in the comedy film Fred 3: Camp Fred directed by Jonathan Judge, which was released on July 28, 2012. That same year, he played the role of Karl in the Disney XD film Gulliver Quinn. He made his television debut in the sketch-comedy reality series AwesomenessTV in the episode "Random Thoughts by JoJo", based on the YouTube channel of the same name and is created by Brian Robbins.

Bragg was cast to play the main role in the Disney Channel comedy series Liv and Maddie with Dove Cameron, in which he played the main role of Joey Rooney, which aired from 2013 to 2017. In 2015, Bragg starred alongside Sean Giambrone in the Disney XD film Mark & Russell's Wild Ride, in which he played the lead character as Mark. On the same year, he starred with Nash Grier and Cameron Dallas in the sports comedy-drama film The Outfield, where he played the lead role of Austin York. In 2018, Bragg played the role of Richard in the comedy drama film Reach starring Garrett Clayton. On the same year, he was cast in the comedy film Father of the Year with David Spade, Nat Faxon and Matt Shively, which was released on July 20, 2018 by Netflix.

In 2021, Bragg was cast to play the main role of Freddie Raines in the sitcom Call Your Mother alongside Kyra Sedgwick, Rachel Sennott, Austin Crute, Emma Caymares and Patrick Brammall; the series aired from January 13 to May 19, 2021 on ABC.

In 2023, Bragg starred in the comedy drama movie Sid is Dead alongside Mary Stuart Masterson, Carla Gallo, G Hannelius and Jack Griffo, which was released on April 28, 2023.

== Filmography ==
Television and film roles
Year	Title	Role	Notes
2012	Fred 3: Camp Fred	Magoo	Television film
2012	The OD	Peculiar Boy	Short film
2012	Gulliver Quinn	Karl	Unsold television pilot (Disney XD)
2012	Bits and Pieces	Sticky	Television film
2013	AwesomenessTV	N/A	Episode: "Random Thoughts by JoJo"
2013–2017	Liv and Maddie	Joey Rooney	Main role
2014	Jessie	Joey Rooney	Episode: "Jessie's Aloha-holidays with Parker and Joey"
2015	The Hotwives of Las Vegas	Teenager	Episode: "Labor of Love"
2015	Mark & Russell's Wild Ride	Mark Wellner	Television film (Disney XD)
2015	The Outfield	Austin York	Direct-to-video film
2016	Criminal Minds	Kyle Ecklund	Episode: "The Anti-Terror Squad"
2016	Foursome	Stan	Episode: "After Shocker"
2017	Wet Hot American Summer: Ten Years Later	Seth	3 episodes
2017–2019	Betch	Various	5 episodes
2018	Hacking High School	Jake	Episode: "Sex Issues"
2018	Love Daily	Ben	Episode: "Soulmate Psychic"
2018	The Thundermans	Balfour/The Gamer	Episode: "The Thunder Games"
2018	Father of the Year	Ben	originally titled Who Do You Think Would Win?
2018	Reach	Richard	Post-production film
2020	4/20	Josh Kaleesian the Comweedian	
2021	Call Your Mother	Freddie Raines	Main role
2022	That Girl Lay Lay	Phone Repair Guy	2 episodes
2022	The Storyteller Series	Sam Kelly	Episode: "A Thing of Beauty"; Podcast series
2023	Sid Is Dead	Sid Sandagger	
2024	The Thundermans Return	Balfour	appears in a deleted scene
2025	A Breed Apart	Vince Vertura	
2025	Let's Call the Whole Thing Off	Jacob	
2026	The Comeback	Johnny	Episode: "Valerie Gets a New Chapter"
