= Liv and Maddie =

American teen sitcom

- Genre: Teen sitcom
- Created by: John D. Beck & Ron Hart
- Starring: Dove Cameron; Joey Bragg; Tenzing Norgay Trainor; Kali Rocha; Benjamin King; Lauren Lindsey Donzis
- Theme music composer: Bardur Haberg; Oli Jogvansson; Molly Kaye; Paula Winger
- Opening theme: "Better in Stereo" by Dove Cameron
- Composers: Eric Goldman & Ken Lofkoll
- Country of origin: United States
- Original language: English
- No. of seasons: 4
- No. of episodes: 80 (list of episodes)

Production
- Executive producers: John D. Beck & Ron Hart; Andy Fickman; Betsy Sullenger; John Peaslee
- Producer: Greg A. Hampson
- Camera setup: Multi-camera
- Running time: 21–24 minutes
- Production companies: Beck & Hart Productions; Oops Doughnuts Productions; It's a Laugh Productions

Original release
- Network: Disney Channel
- Release: July 19, 2013 – March 24, 2017

Liv and Maddie is an American teen sitcom created by John D. Beck and Ron Hart. It premiered on Disney Channel on July 19, 2013, and concluded after four seasons on March 24, 2017, with the episode "End-a-Rooney", which was also the series' eightieth episode. The series stars Dove Cameron, Joey Bragg, Tenzing Norgay Trainor, Kali Rocha, Benjamin King, and Lauren Lindsey Donzis.

A significant feature of the series is that Dove Cameron plays dual roles, one being Liv, an actress who has returned to her home after starring on a popular television series in Hollywood for four years, and the other one being Maddie, Liv's identical twin who remained behind. Another significant feature of the series are documentary-style cutaways where characters speak to the viewers to explain their opinions on various situations in each episode.

== Plot ==
Actress Liv Rooney is a girly girl who has just returned to her birthplace of Stevens Point, Wisconsin, after finishing a four-year stint in Hollywood, filming a popular television series called Sing It Loud! Her identical twin sister, Maddie, a tomboy with an aptitude for sports and a particular talent for basketball, welcomes Liv back home with open arms. The twins have two younger brothers: Joey, a typical awkward teen who is one year younger than the twins, and Parker, a clever tween with a mischievous personality and the youngest child of the Rooney family. Their parents are Karen, the high school psychologist and later the high school's vice principal, and Pete, the coach of Maddie's high school basketball team who later accepts a position as the coach of a college team in Beloit, Wisconsin. The series revolves around Liv adjusting to normal family life after her successful career in Hollywood. Most events take place at the Rooney residence or at Ridgewood High School. At the end of the third season, the Rooney house collapses and Maddie enrolls in a college in Los Angeles, California. This prompts the rest of the Rooneys, except Pete who remains in Wisconsin to continue his coaching job, to move to Malibu, California, to take up residence with Karen's younger sister, Dena, and her daughter, Ruby, where the series' fourth season takes place.

== Episodes ==
| Season | Episodes | Originally released | |
| Season | Episodes | First released | Last released |
|---|---|---|---|
| 1 | 21 | July 19, 2013 | July 27, 2014 |
| 2 | 24 | September 21, 2014 | August 23, 2015 |
| 3 | 20 | September 13, 2015 | June 19, 2016 |
| 4 | 15 | September 23, 2016 | March 24, 2017 |

== Cast ==
- Dove Cameron as Liv and Maddie Rooney
- Joey Bragg as Joey Rooney
- Tenzing Norgay Trainor as Parker Rooney
- Kali Rocha as Karen Rooney
- Benjamin King as Pete Rooney (seasons 1–3)
- Lauren Lindsey Donzis as Ruby (season 4)

== Production ==
=== Development ===
Liv and Maddie began production in April 2013. The series was created by John D. Beck and Ron Hart, both of whom also serve as executive producers alongside Andy Fickman. Beck and Hart are a production-writing team whose credits include According to Jim, Hey Arnold!, and Shake It Up!. Originally, the pair had shopped a script of a project called Bits and Pieces which featured a blended family similar to series like The Brady Bunch and Step by Step. The series is produced under a joint venture by Beck & Hart Productions, Oops Doughnuts Productions, and It's a Laugh Productions.

On January 13, 2014, Disney Channel renewed Liv and Maddie for a 13-episode second season slated to premiere in fall 2014. The second season was later expanded to 24 episodes. The second season premiered on September 21, 2014. The series was renewed for a third season by Disney Channel on April 3, 2015. The third season premiered on September 13, 2015. On December 21, 2015, actress Dove Cameron stated that Disney Channel was picking up Liv and Maddie for a fourth season. On June 19, 2016, series co-creator Ron Hart announced on Twitter that the fourth season would premiere in fall 2016. On July 1, 2016, Dove Cameron stated that they had filmed the series' final episode. On August 19, 2016, it was announced by the series' creators, John D. Beck and Ron Hart, that the final season would be called Liv and Maddie: Cali Style. They also stated that the fourth and final season would premiere on September 23, 2016.

=== Casting ===
Casting took place during the spring of 2012; however, only a pilot episode was produced. The series followed Kali Rocha, Dove Cameron, Joey Bragg, Benjamin King, Cozi Zuehlsdorff, and Tenzing Norgay Trainor portraying Jodie Sullenger, mother of Alanna and Sticky, who married Pete Fickman, father of Crystal and Brody, with all six adjusting to life under the same roof. Eventually, Disney chose to change the concept of Bits and Pieces into one about a pair of twins. Instead of hiring a new cast, production chose to keep those whom they had already hired and film a completely new pilot. The story now focused on Dove Cameron playing dual roles with the same parents and brothers. Lead billing for Cozi Zuehlsdorff was later dropped to guest star. The family name of "Rooney" was picked because of Sullenger's enjoyment of the Pittsburgh Steelers, a team owned by the Rooney family.

=== Music ===
A full version of the Liv and Maddie theme song, "Better in Stereo", was recorded by Dove Cameron and released as a promotional single by Walt Disney Records on October 15, 2013. A music video was filmed and aired on Disney Channel the night of October 29, 2013. The song was featured twice in the show, first in the season three finale, "Californi-a-Rooney", and then an acoustic version sung by Dove Cameron during the season four and series finale, "End-a-Rooney".

In the pilot, "Twin-a-Rooney", Liv shows Maddie a clip from the Sing It Loud! finale in which Liv's character, Stephanie Einstein, sings a cover of On Top of the World by Imagine Dragons. A full version of the song was recorded by Cameron and was released as a promotional single by Walt Disney Records on August 27, 2013.

In "Fa-La-La-a-Rooney", Liv performs the classic "Let It Snow! Let It Snow! Let It Snow!" during the Stevens Point Holiday Spectacular. A full version of the song was recorded by Dove Cameron and is included on Holidays Unwrapped, a holiday album released by Walt Disney Records on October 15, 2013.

In "Song-a-Rooney", Liv performs "FroyoYOLO" which goes viral, but Liv hates it. In the same episode, Liv performs "Count Me In". A full version of "Count Me In" was recorded by Dove Cameron and was released as a promotional single by Walt Disney Records on June 3, 2014.

In "New Year's Eve-a-Rooney", Liv performs "You, Me and the Beat". A full version of the song was recorded by Cameron and was released as a promotional single by Walt Disney Records on December 2, 2014.

In "Rate-a-Rooney", Liv uploads "What a Girl Is". Two versions were created: the first being the one shown on Liv and Maddie and the other, including Christina Grimmie and Baby Kaely, was eventually recorded. Both versions are included in the Liv and Maddie soundtrack. The second version was released on iTunes on March 5, 2015, while the original version was released on March 17, 2015. On March 17, 2015, the Liv and Maddie soundtrack was released. The soundtrack includes "Better in Stereo", "On Top of the World", "FroyoYOLO", "Count Me In", "You, Me and the Beat", and both versions of "What a Girl Is". The soundtrack also includes "Say Hey", "As Long as I Have You", and "True Love", of which the last one would be morphed into two versions: Ballad, which would be sung by Jordan Fisher, and a piano duet featuring Jordan Fisher and Dove Cameron. With the announcement of the soundtrack on March 5, 2015, the singles for those songs, minus FroyoYOLO, were discontinued and are no longer available.

In "Prom-a-Rooney", Liv performs "True Love" at the school prom. Like she did with the other songs, Dove Cameron recorded a full version of the song which was released as part of the Liv and Maddie soundtrack on March 17, 2015.

In "Band-a-Rooney", Liv's band, "The Dream", performs "Say Hey" at the Battle of the Bands. A full version was recorded by Dove Cameron, with the band member's actor doing the chorus. The song was released as part of the Liv and Maddie soundtrack on March 17, 2015.

In "Video-a-Rooney", Liv's band performs "As Long as I Have You". Dove Cameron recorded a full version which was released as part of the Liv and Maddie soundtrack on March 17, 2015. The song was the final song from the soundtrack that was played in the series.

In "SPARF-a-Rooney", Andy Grammer performs "Honey, I'm Good". This is one of the few songs in Liv and Maddie not to be part of the soundtrack.

In "Sing It Louder!!-a-Rooney", Liv and Ruby perform "One Second Chance" on the set of "Sing It Louder!!" The song was recorded by Dove Cameron and Lauren Lindsey Donzis and was released as a promotional single by Walt Disney Records on November 4, 2016.

In "Falcon-a-Rooney", "The Power of Two" is performed again by Liv and Ruby for "Sing It Louder!!" Like the previous song in season four, Dove Cameron and Lauren Lindsey Donzis recorded a full song, released on January 20, 2017.

In "Sing It Live!!!-a-Rooney, Liv sings "My Destiny" for the special episode of "Sing It Louder!!" Again, a full version of the song was recorded by Dove Cameron and released as a promotional single on March 3, 2017.

==== Songs ====
List of songs in Liv and Maddie
| Title | Performed by | First episode |
|---|---|---|
| "Better in Stereo" | Dove Cameron | "Twin-a-Rooney" |
| "On Top of the World" | Dove Cameron | "Twin-a-Rooney" |
| "Up on the Housetop" | Dove Cameron and Ella Anderson | "Fa-La-La-a-Rooney" |
| "Let It Snow, Let It Snow, Let It Snow" | Dove Cameron | "Fa-La-La-a-Rooney" |
| "Froyo Yolo" | Dove Cameron | "Song-a-Rooney" |
| "Count Me In" | Dove Cameron | "Song-a-Rooney" |
| "You, Me and the Beat" | Dove Cameron | "New Year's Eve-a-Rooney" |
| "What a Girl Is" | Dove Cameron | "Rate-a-Rooney" |
| "True Love" | Dove Cameron | "Prom-a-Rooney" |
| "Say Hey" | Dove Cameron | "Band-a-Rooney" |
| "As Long as I Have You" | Dove Cameron | "Video-a-Rooney" |
| "Honey, I'm Good" | Andy Grammer | "SPARF-a-Rooney" |
| "Key of Life" | Dove Cameron | "Dream-a-Rooney" |
| "One Second Chance" | Dove Cameron and Lauren Lindsey Donzis | "Sing It Louder!!-a-Rooney" |
| "Power of Two" | Dove Cameron and Lauren Lindsey Donzis | "Falcon-a-Rooney" |
| "My Destiny" | Dove Cameron | "Sing It Live!!!-a-Rooney" |

== Broadcast ==
Liv and Maddie airs on Disney Channel in the United States and Family Channel in Canada. The pilot episode aired as a preview on July 19, 2013. The first promo for the series was seen on June 28, 2013. The series officially premiered in the United States on September 15, 2013, and in Canada on September 20, 2013. The series stopped airing in Canada on Family Channel on September 1, 2015, and started airing on Disney Channel on September 5, 2015. La Chaîne Disney in French Canada premiered the episode "Home Run-a-Rooney" on March 24, 2016, 17 days before the US and Canada airing on April 10, 2016. In the UK and Ireland, the series aired a preview on October 7, 2013, and later premiered on November 8, 2013. In Australia and New Zealand, the series premiered on October 11, 2013. The second season premiered on January 8, 2015. The third season premiered on December 2, 2015. The series premiered in Southeast Asia on January 10, 2014. In the Balkans, Greece, the Middle East and Africa, the series premiered on March 8, 2014. The second season premiered on February 7, 2015. In India, the series premiered on October 30, 2017, on Disney International HD.

== Reception ==
=== Critical ===
Emily Ashby of Common Sense Media gave the series' quality a rating of three out of five stars, describing it as a "jovial family sitcom" and applicable for ages seven and above. Ashby credited the series' "comical spin" on common family issues, like sibling rivalry, stating: "As is true of most tween-targeted comedies, the series glosses over a lot, especially when it comes to teen issues, but that's what makes it a worry-free pick for kids." Neil Genzlinger of The New York Times compared the series to The Patty Duke Show while describing it as "a gentle, moderately amusing comedy" and praising Dove Cameron's portrayal of the down-to-earth Maddie and diva Liv, stating: "...the premise gives the writers plenty of opportunities."

=== Ratings ===
Viewership and ratings per season of Liv and Maddie
| Season | Episodes | First aired | | Last aired | | Avg. viewers (millions) |
| Season | Episodes | Date | Viewers (millions) | Date | Viewers (millions) | Avg. viewers (millions) |
|---|---|---|---|---|---|---|
| 1 | 20 | July 19, 2013 | 5.78 | July 27, 2014 | N/A | 2.87 |
| 2 | 24 | September 21, 2014 | 2.04 | August 23, 2015 | 2.45 | 2.17 |
| 3 | 20 | September 13, 2015 | 1.80 | June 19, 2016 | 1.53 | 1.87 |
| 4 | 15 | September 23, 2016 | 1.66 | March 24, 2017 | 1.30 | 1.21 |

=== Awards and nominations ===
| Year | Award | Category | Result | Ref. |
|---|---|---|---|---|
| 2014 | Kids' Choice Awards Mexico | Favorite International Program | Nominated | |
| 2014 | Kids' Choice Awards Mexico | Favorite International Program | Nominated | |
| 2015 | Kids' Choice Awards Colombia | Favorite International Program | Nominated | |
| 2016 | Teen Choice Awards | Choice TV Show: Comedy | Nominated | |
| 2016 | Kids' Choice Awards Mexico | Favorite International Program | Nominated | |
| 2016 | Kids' Choice Awards Colombia | Favorite International Program | Won | |
| 2016 | Kids' Choice Awards Argentina | Favorite International Program | Won | |
| 2017 | Kids' Choice Awards Mexico | Favorite International Program | Won | |
| 2017 | Kids' Choice Awards Colombia | Favorite International Program | Won | |
| 2017 | Kids' Choice Awards Argentina | Favorite International Program | Won | |

== Merchandise ==
Brand marketing promotion from Liv and Maddie still continues strongly, with ACCO Brands, under the Day Dream brand, featuring a 2015 wall calendar and Disney D'Signed clothing line from selected retailers Target and Kohl's. Wooky Entertainment owns Style Me Up, a creative fashion brand for tween girls, featuring Liv and Maddie: Dreams Come True and Liv and Maddie: A Rising Star sketchbooks. Footwear retailer Payless ShoeSource conducts Liv and Maddie-themed character footwear based on the series.

A novelization of the series, titled Liv and Maddie: Sisters Forever, was published by Disney Press on January 6, 2015. The junior novel is based on the episodes "Twin-a-Rooney" and "Team-a-Rooney", and alternates between the view points of Liv, Maddie, Joey, and Parker. Featuring eight pages of photos from the series, the junior novel was adapted by Lexi Ryals. Another novelization of the series, titled Liv and Maddie: Double Trouble, was published by Disney Press on August 4, 2015. It is based on the episodes "Sweet-16-a-Rooney" and "Dodge-a-Rooney". Like the first novel, Double Trouble features eight pages of photos from the series and was adapted by Lexi Ryals. Also like the first novel, Double Trouble alternates between the view points of Liv, Maddie, Joey, and Parker.
