= Marita Geraghty =

American actress (born 1965)

- Born: March 26, 1965 (age 61); Chicago, Illinois, U.S.
- Occupation: Actress
- Years active: 1986–2009, 2025–present
- Spouse(s): Michael Maguire (1991-2001) (divorced); Christopher Cool(?-)

Marita Geraghty (born March 26, 1965) is an American television and film actress. She had roles in several movies during the late 1980s and early 1990s, most notably as Nancy Taylor in Groundhog Day.

Geraghty was born in Chicago. She graduated from the University of Illinois and made her Broadway debut on October 6, 1987 in Coastal Disturbances, where she played the role of Holly Dancer, a somewhat depressive 24-year-old photographer from New York, who fancies Leo, a handsome, impulsive lifeguard of 28, still smarting from a failed engagement.

== Filmography ==
=== Film ===
- No Mercy (1986) — Alice Collins
- Hiding Out (1987) — Janie Rooney
- Broadcast News (1987) — Date-rape Woman
- Fresh Horses (1988) — Maureen
- Sleeping with the Enemy (1991) — Julie
- This Is My Life (1992) — Mia Jablon
- Hero (1992) — Joan
- Groundhog Day (1993) — Nancy Taylor
- Don Juan DeMarco (1994) — Woman in Restaurant
- In the Flesh (1995) — Carla Mitchelson
- Use as Directed (2008, short) — June
- Feed the Horses (2025, short) — Eileen

=== Television ===
- Spenser: For Hire (1988) — Janet / Elizabeth Canning Anthony
- Hard Time on Planet Earth (1989) — Karen
- Law & Order (1990) — Rebecca Byrne
- Against the Law (1990) — Mariella Wilson
- To Save a Child (1991, TV movie) — Isabella Larson
- Woops! (1992) — Suzanne Stillman
- Past Tense (1994, TV movie) — Dawn Tripplet
- Seinfeld (1994) — Margaret
- Mad About You (1995) — Velma
- Frasier (1996) — Amanda
- Chicago Hope (1997) — Monica Blaine
- The Luck of the Irish (2001, TV movie) — Kate O'Reilly Johnson / Kate Smith
- Judging Amy (2001) — Julie Baker
- CSI: Crime Scene Investigation (2003) — Jane Damon
- Touched by an Angel (2003) — Deborah Jackson
- Charmed (2003) — Katrina
- Miss Match (2003) — Meaghan Smalls
- Numb3rs (2005) — Jessica Avery
- The Ex List (2009)

== Stage work ==
- Present Laughter (1986)
- Biloxi Blues (1986)
- Coastal Disturbances (1987)
- Spoils of War (1989)
- The Night of the Iguana
- The Heidi Chronicles
- The Good Doctor (2000)
- Distracted (2007)
