= All-American Girl (TV series) =

1994 American television sitcom

- DVD cover
- Genre: Sitcom
- Created by: Gary Jacobs
- Starring: Margaret Cho; Jodi Long; Clyde Kusatsu; Amy Hill; Maddie Corman; Ashley Johnson; Judy Gold; J.B. Quon; BD Wong
- Music by: George Englund Jr.
- Country of origin: United States
- Original language: English
- No. of seasons: 1
- No. of episodes: 19

Production
- Executive producers: Gary Jacobs; Gail Berman; Sandy Gallin; Stuart Sheslow
- Producer: Bruce Johnson
- Cinematography: Daniel Flannery
- Editor: Jimmy B. Frazier
- Production companies: Sandollar Television; Heartfelt Productions; Touchstone Television

Original release
- Network: ABC
- Release: September 14, 1994 – March 15, 1995

All-American Girl is an American television sitcom starring Margaret Cho. The series aired on ABC from September 14, 1994, to March 15, 1995. It was loosely based on Cho's own experiences growing up in a Korean American family in San Francisco. Cho starred as Margaret Kim, the rebellious daughter of Korean immigrants and bookstore owners. Her American attitude often comes into conflict with that of her more traditional parents (Jodi Long and Clyde Kusatsu). Among her co-stars were BD Wong as Margaret's brother, and Amy Hill as her eccentric grandmother.

All-American Girl was created by ABC to capitalize on the trend of female comedians headlining their own sitcoms. Cho was included in a Wednesday night lineup that included other women in lead roles—Brett Butler (Grace Under Fire), Ellen DeGeneres (Ellen), and most successfully, Roseanne Barr (Roseanne).

The series was criticized for its depiction of Korean Americans and for stereotyping characters. ABC attempted to counter low ratings by retooling the show into an ensemble sitcom about Margaret and her white friends, but the revamping was unsuccessful. The series was cancelled after one season.

== Premise ==
All-American Girl takes place in San Francisco, where Margaret Kim tries to navigate life with her family, friends, and romantic partners. In the Kim family household, Margaret has many squabbles with her very traditional mother, Katherine, who wants nothing more than for her to settle down with a Korean boy and be successful. Her passive father plays more of the middle-man in these touchy debates, and prefers to spend time working in their family-owned bookstore. Also in the house are Margaret's brothers — her successful older brother, Dr. Stuart Kim, and her admiring younger brother, Eric — and eccentric Grandma Kim. Margaret is a college student who frequently bounces between majors and works at the cosmetics counter of a department store with her friends, Ruthie and Gloria.

In the pilot episode of All-American Girl, "Mom, Dad, This is Kyle", Margaret's mother, Katherine Kim, strongly disapproves of Margaret's white boyfriend Kyle. She constantly tries to set up the daughter with successful, intelligent Korean men, creating a recurring conflict between Margaret and her mother.

Margaret, tired of her mother's constant matchmaking, convinces her to have Kyle over for dinner. At the dinner, Katherine makes no effort to accept Kyle. In frustration Margaret rashly decides to announce to everyone that she and Kyle are moving in together, simply to irritate her mother. Margaret realizes that she does not want to move out of the house and decides to stay in the end.

== Cast ==
=== Main ===
- Margaret Cho as Margaret Kim, the main character of the series and the daughter in the Kim family. She is much more Americanized than the other members of her family, which is often a source of misunderstandings between her and her family.
- Amy Hill as Yung-hee "Grandma" Kim, Margaret's eccentric grandmother who is unassimilated and often refers to the "Old Country". She is addicted to watching television.
- Jodi Long as Katherine Kim, Margaret's mother. She is portrayed as a "tiger mom", imposing strict rules on Margaret and her siblings and setting extremely high expectations for them, especially for Margaret's older brother, Stuart. She runs a bookstore with her husband, Benny Kim.
- Clyde Kusatsu as Benny Kim, Margaret's father. While also a strict parent, he is also more understanding of Margaret, mostly the straight man and sometimes assists in mediating disagreements between Margaret and her mother.
- Maddie Corman as Ruthie Latham, one of Margaret's best friends, who works with Margaret in a department store.
- Judy Gold as Gloria Schechter, another one of Margaret's friends who works at the department store.
- J.B. Quon as Eric Kim, Margaret's younger brother who looks up to Margaret, much to his parents' dismay.
- BD Wong as Dr. Stuart Kim, Margaret's older brother who is a successful doctor, and constantly under extreme pressure from himself and his parents to achieve more. He is considered the obedient and well-behaved son.
- Ashley Johnson as Casey Emerson, one of Eric's friends who spends a lot of time at the Kims' house. After "Malpractice Makes Perfect", she does not appear again.

=== Notable guest stars ===
- Ming-Na Wen as Amy, Stuart's fiancé. ("Redesigning Women")
- Tsai Chin as Auntie June ("Take My Family, Please")
- Daniel Dae Kim as Stan ("Ratting on Ruthie")
- Eric Lutes as Grant ("Loveless in San Francisco")
- Oprah Winfrey as herself ("A Night at the Oprah")
- Michael Palance as Derek ("Mommie Nearest")
- Jack Black as Tommy, a band member managed by Margaret's friend. ("A Night at the Oprah")
- Quentin Tarantino as Desmond, Margaret's boyfriend who she discovers sells bootlegged videotapes. At the time of All-American Girl, Tarantino was dating Cho, and coming off the success of his film Pulp Fiction. ("Pulp Sitcom")
- Robert Clohessy as Average Tony ("Pulp Sitcom")
- Vicki Lawrence as Phone Lady ("Young Americans")
- John Terlesky as Tim ("Young Americans")

== Episodes ==
| No. | Title | Directed by | Written by | Original release date | Prod. code | Viewers (millions) |
|---|---|---|---|---|---|---|
| 1 | "Mom, Dad, This Is Kyle" | Andrew D. Weyman | Gary Jacobs | September 14, 1994 | M401 | 25.3 |
Katherine dislikes Margaret's latest boyfriend, Kyle, and even more so after Margaret forces her parents to invite him over for dinner. Margaret impulsively announces they're moving in together, only to realize she doesn't like him that much.
| 2 | "Submission: Impossible" | Terry Hughes | J. J. Paulsen | September 21, 1994 | M404 | 15.4 |
After her poet boyfriend dumps her to move to Spokane, Margaret agrees to Katherine setting her up with the more traditional Raymond (Garrett Wang). Seeing how happy Katherine is, and liking how Raymond treats her respectfully, Margaret attempts to act more traditionally — much to the annoyance of her friends and family. Margaret eventually realizes she cannot continue to change herself for Raymond, and breaks up with him.
| 3 | "Who's the Boss?" | Terry Hughes | Clay Graham | September 28, 1994 | M403 | 16.6 |
Margaret gets a promotion at the cosmetics counter, resulting in co-worker Ruthie trying to take advantage of their friendship. At home, Grandma is convinced that the family's run of bad luck is the result of bad feng shui.
| 4 | "Yung at Heart" | Terry Hughes | Elizabeth Wong | October 5, 1994 | M402 | 15.5 |
When Margaret accidentally loses Grandma at the mall, Grandma returns home with a new boyfriend, Sammy (Sab Shimono). Soon, she and Sammy are making plans to move to Florida, much to the anxiety of the family. However, Grandma realizes that she cannot leave her family in San Francisco, and breaks up with him.
| 5 | "Redesigning Women" | Terry Hughes | Dawn DeKeyser | October 12, 1994 | M408 | 16.6 |
Stuart quickly gets engaged to girlfriend Amy (Ming-Na Wen), and Katherine immediately volunteers Margaret to organize the bachelorette party. When Margaret takes the more traditional Amy to a club with Ruthie and Gloria, the three convince Amy she needs to come out of her shell, and do things she wants to do. This causes Stuart and Amy to fight and call of their engagement, and Margaret is left to fix it.
| 6 | "Booktopus" | Terry Hughes | Tim Maile and Douglas Tuber | October 19, 1994 | M405 | 16.3 |
The Kims are given an offer to sell their bookstore to a large chain. When they decline, the chain announces that they will build a store across the street.
| 7 | "Mommie Nearest" | Terry Hughes | Kell Cahoon and Tom Saunders | October 26, 1994 | M406 | 16.6 |
When Ruthie and Gloria convince Margaret to temporarily hire Katherine at the cosmetics counter, she wreaks havoc on Margaret's work and social life.
| 8 | "Take My Family, Please" | Terry Hughes | Pat Dougherty | November 2, 1994 | M407 | 15.4 |
Margaret does a comedy routine about her family in a karaoke bar, unaware that her parents and their friends are in the audience.
| 9 | "Exile on Market Street" | Terry Hughes | Jon Sherman | November 16, 1994 | M410 | 14.5 |
Stressed out from studying for her LSAT, Margaret goes out clubbing with Ruthie and Gloria to calm her nerves before taking the test. However, a fight with a bouncer lands her in jail. Grandma is no help either, when she too is arrested for slapping a police officer who insulted Margaret. While in jail, Grandma helps Margaret realize she doesn't actually want to take the LSAT, but instead pursue a more creative career.
| 10 | "Ratting on Ruthie" | Terry Hughes | Pat Dougherty | November 23, 1994 | M409 | 13.2 |
Margaret has a moral crisis when a case of expensive perfume vanishes while Ruthie is away from the counter and she struggles with what to tell management. For the first time in Margaret's life, Katherine doesn't have any advice for her.
| 11 | "Educating Margaret" | Terry Hughes | Arnie Kogen | November 30, 1994 | M411 | 14.9 |
Margaret dates a British film professor but is disappointed to learn that he is a complete bore in spite of his interesting work.
| 12 | "Loveless in San Francisco" | Terry Hughes | Dawn DeKeyser | December 7, 1994 | M412 | 16.0 |
As a result of Margaret's "dating slump", Stuart suggests she volunteer at the hospital to meet guys.
| 13 | "Malpractice Makes Perfect" | Terry Hughes | Kell Cahoon and Tom Saunders | December 14, 1994 | M414 | 14.8 |
Stuart makes a mistake at the hospital. This amuses Margaret until he expresses he wants to give up his medical career.
| 14 | "The Apartment" | Terry Hughes | Elizabeth Wong | January 11, 1995 | M415 | 16.6 |
Margaret wants to assert her independence, but cannot afford the two-bedroom apartment she found. Ruthie and Gloria offer to be her roommates, and the three girls think it will be fun living together. However, their lifestyles quickly collide, and the three girls find being roommates a living hell. To save their friendship, Margaret decides to move back home, and live in the basement.
| 15 | "Notes from the Underground" | Terry Hughes | Tim Maile and Douglas Tuber | January 18, 1995 | M413 | 13.8 |
Margaret moves into her family's basement and dates the handyman who fixes the place up, while Grandma gets a viewer-tracking device but can't handle the pressure of being a TV ratings household.
| 16 | "Venus de Margaret" | Terry Hughes | Dawn DeKeyser | January 25, 1995 | M417 | 17.5 |
Margaret poses for her sculptor ex-boyfriend but has second thoughts when the nude sculpture goes on display.
| 17 | "A Night at the Oprah" | Terry Hughes | Charleen Easton and Kurt Schindler | February 15, 1995 | M416 | 15.7 |
When Margaret discovers her old high school pal Lisa (Jana Marie Hupp) has made a successful living managing a band, she seriously considers dropping out of college to become a manager herself. Grandma discovers that Oprah is coming to San Francisco, and is overjoyed when Lisa gets her, Margaret, and Katherine tickets to a taping with a psychologist as the guest. However, the Kims come to dominate the Oprah taping, when Margaret reveals to her mother on about her considering dropping out of school on national television.
| 18 | "Pulp Sitcom" | Terry Hughes | Tim Maile and Douglas Tuber | February 22, 1995 | M418 | 16.5 |
Benny sets up Margaret with the store's video rental salesman Desmond (Quentin Tarantino), whom she is initially reluctant to go out with. She discovers that Desmond is actually a cool guy, and genuinely likes him. However, she later discovers the videos he sells are bootlegs, and the family gets involved when Desmond comes to hide with them from mobster Average Tony (Robert Clohessy). When both men have to run from the police (whom Stuart called), Margaret regretfully says goodbye to Desmond, and asks Benny to set her up on more dates.
| 19 | "Young Americans" | Arlene Sanford | Aline Brosh McKenna and Jeff Kahn | March 15, 1995 | M419 | 13.3 |
Margaret has now moved into a low-rent apartment with three guys — Spencer (Diedrich Bader), Phil (Sam Seder), and Jimmy (Andrew Lowery). Margaret is anxious to hear back about a job interview at a record label, which is intensified when she and Phil have to deal with a rude phone customer service rep (Vicki Lawrence). When rats are found in the apartment, Jimmy and Spencer disagree on whether or not to call an exterminator. This episode was meant to serve as a retooling of the series, to be titled Young Americans. The series would have revolved around the roommates, plus Grandma Kim (the only original cast member other than Margaret to appear) and Jane (Mariska Hargitay) a bartender at the roommates' local hangout.

== Production ==
=== Conception ===
All-American Girl was pitched to ABC amidst a boon of female-led sitcoms. The show's creators suggested other titles for the series such as East Meets West and Wok on the Wild Side, before deciding on All-American Girl. Said Cho of the show's concept:

[It] is about two basic things: It's about me having these two families that I don't exactly relate to--my family at home, my biological family, who are very traditional, kind of strict and a very Asian, very Korean family. And they don't understand me because I'm just too wild and too Americanized. And then there's my family of friends who understand me but find me a little bit conservative. So I'm in between these kind of two extreme cultures. It's something I think a lot of Asian Americans go through because many live at home in a more controlled environment and then they go out or watch TV and they're exposed to this whole other world. [The series] is exploring the feelings associated with assimilation and becoming an American.

All-American Girl was marketed as being based on Cho's stand-up comedy routines, though Cho said that it "was mostly just a gloss" and used to attract fans of her stand-up. ABC also touted the series as the first TV sitcom to center Asian Americans; however, Mr. T and Tina, which centered on a Japanese American man and his two children, had aired on the network nearly two decades prior.

Unlike the stars of shows like Roseanne, Ellen, and Grace Under Fire, Cho said she had little input in the creative process. Before production began, ABC executives began criticizing Cho about her weight, although Cho claims there had been no issue about her weight before filming began. ABC executives and producers encouraged her to go on a crash diet; in two weeks, she lost 30 lbs (14 kg). This resulted in her having to be hospitalized for kidney failure, and leading to major health issues that continued for years after the show. In a later interview, Cho said she believes that because she was not white, executives and the producers felt they had to "make up for it in other ways", which was the reasoning behind this.

=== Broadcast ===
All-American Girl premiered on ABC on September 14, 1994, airing at 9:30pm after Home Improvement. Thereafter, it aired on the network's Wednesday night comedy block at 8:30pm as the lead-in for Roseanne and Ellen. The premiere episode drew in 16.8 million U.S. viewers, helping the network to a consecutive ratings victory for that week. After its premiere, ratings dropped substantially.

== Themes ==
=== Cultural and generational differences ===
The Kim family is intended to be portrayed as a typical Asian American family, and a recurring concept is the clash of values between the more Americanized Margaret and her traditional parents. Among the values and expectations thought to be typical of Asian American culture that are exhibited by the Kim parents include obedience and respect for elders, a high regard of education and success, and placing the most importance on the eldest son.

=== Femininity ===
In All-American Girl, Margaret Kim comes across as a typical college-age girl with somewhat of a rebellious streak, much to the chagrin of her very no-nonsense mother. She has an edgy sense of style, wearing short dresses, leather outfits, and following the trends of the average American girl from the 1990s. She wears different clothes, speaks in a higher register, laughs daintily behind her hand, and comes across as very polite—a significant contrast from her typically brash character. She manipulates her femininity to get what she wants, but this inevitably backfires when she is rejected for not maintaining this desired on trait.

This issue of desirable female traits played a part in the production decisions behind the show. Producers told Cho to lose weight, resulting in her drastic weight loss of 30 pounds in two weeks and leaving lasting health complications. Said Cho, "I didn't have these attributes that [producers] think of when they think of like a female star of a show. You know, I wasn't thin [and] I wasn't white".

=== Romantic relationships ===
Throughout All-American Girl, Margaret Kim flutters around multiple male characters and maintains about 7 short-lived relationships, all of which last for only one episode. The first episode "Mom, Dad, This is Kyle", centers on Margaret Kim and her American boyfriend Kyle, whom her mother constantly claims is a "loser" and that he is not right for her. Margaret then counters that her mother only disapproves of Kyle because he's not Korean, and a fight ensues. Margaret does not in fact have strong feelings for Kyle, but she simply refuses to back down to her mother, who appears to be equally stubborn. In this sense, Margaret's romantic relationship is downplayed in favor of highlighting the conflicting, but loving, relationship between Margaret and her mother. In the second episode, the opposite situation occurs and Margaret finds herself dating a Korean boy that her mother has set her up with. Margaret's mother is ecstatic, but Margaret finds herself slowly altering her behavior to suit the desires of her Korean suitor—by the end of the episode, she ends the charade by coming clean about her true personality and their relationship ends. Unfortunately, because Margaret was honest and true to herself, she ends up losing a relationship due to the discrepancy between her "American" self and her "Korean" self. In subsequent episodes, Margaret finds herself dating a variety of male characters, including a professor, a handyman, and a criminal.

== Critical reception ==
On review aggregate website Rotten Tomatoes, 40% of 10 critics gave the series a positive review. The site's critics consensus reads, "Margaret Cho acquits herself nicely as a leading lady, but All-American Girl's hit-and-miss laugh quotient doesn't measure up to her talents."

Brian Lowry of Variety wrote, "There’s a smattering of warmth between these characters" and Cho "is instantly appealing with her product-of-suburbia shtick", but "early scripts don’t provide material to define the character beyond her maternal sparring" and there is "not enough demonstrated early to lift the series beyond the most standard sitcom fare". Writing for Entertainment Weekly, Ken Tucker lamented that the show was the complete opposite of Cho's stand-up comedy, which he said "is all about exploding ethnic myths, starting with the notion that a Korean-American woman is likely to be quiet and demure."

While reviews were positive about Cho and Hill, the series faced scrutiny from the Asian American community. Guy Aoki, head of the Media Action Network for Asian Americans (MANAA), said, "If there is one Asian group that needed a show like this to take care of the misunderstandings people have about them, it's Korean American. We see a family, and we don't see rude grocers who shoot people randomly. I don't think this show will solve all the problems, but given a chance to grow, it will sure help." Prior to the series premiere, Asian American advocacy groups such as MANAA monitored the pilot, read scripts and attended tapings. Members of the Korean American Coalition said they were unhappy with the episode, citing the episode's "confusion of various Asian cultures" and the emphasized accents of characters. Others criticized stereotypes such as the "tiger mother", the expectation for Korean women to be proper and demure, the overachieving nerdy Asian, and the obedient Asian child. Critics said there was a lack of development that allowed for characters, aside from Margaret, to have little depth beyond their perceived archetypes.

The series also received criticism for its casting. Cho was the only Korean American cast member; while BD Wong is of Chinese descent, Amy Hill and Clyde Kusatsu are of Japanese ancestry, and Jodi Long is of mixed Japanese and Chinese ancestry. Critics said this perpetuated the idea of Asians as a monolithic ethnic group, and argued Asian audiences should not be forced to "identify with the Kims simply because they were Asian". Similarly, non-Asian audiences were equally unable to identify with "yet another example of Hollywood's ignorance and indifference when it comes to depicting an ethnic group about which it knows so little". As Cho stated later, "When you're the first person to cross over this racial barrier, you're scrutinized for all these other things that have nothing to do with race, but they have everything to do with race — it's a very strange thing".

Furthermore, the show's use of "butchered Korean language" was criticized. With the majority of the cast not being Korean American, their ability to speak Korean was limited, and none of All-American Girl's directors, writers, or producers were Korean American, though the writing staff included two Asian American writers and a Korean consultant was also hired. Staff writer Elizabeth Wong commented, "This is not a show that deals with politics. It's an 8:30 show that deals with family dynamics. That's what we're interested in. But I very much feel a lot of pressure." Korean American viewers found the briefly spoken Korean phrases to be so flawed as to be essentially unintelligible. Show creator Gary Jacobs and BD Wong pushed back against criticism, with the latter saying, "A heavy accent does not a stereotype make. People have accents and that’s what makes the show beautiful and the world beautiful. The accent is required for the role. This is what’s going on in this country. And now, in this very rare opportunity, we can show this on television."

Playwright Philip W. Chung wrote a defense of the show in the Los Angeles Times, arguing that as the only Asian American focused-TV show at the time, All-American Girl was subject to unfair expectations. Chung wrote, "No show can single-handedly carry the burdens of an entire community. No one looks at the family on 'The Brady Bunch' as a representation of all white families but, unfortunately, due to a lack of any real Asian American presence in the media, 'All-American Girl' must become a symbol to a certain degree." In response to his opinion piece, Asian American industry groups voiced their support for the show, stating that "while no one should blindly support any endeavor", they recognized the importance of Asian American representation as a whole and had engaged in a letter-writing campaign to persuade ABC to renew the series for a second season.

== Revamp and cancellation ==
The series struggled in the ratings from the beginning. ABC executives and producers constantly attempted to change the series’ format in an attempt to improve ratings. After negative reviews and controversy, episodes became less focused on the Kim family as a whole, and more centered on Margaret and Grandma Kim.

After the thirteenth episode, Ashley Johnson — who was added after the pilot — was written out of the series completely, while Ruthie, Gloria, and the rest of the Kims — besides Margaret and Grandma — appeared to be slowly phased out. Amy Hill was retained through these changes as Grandma Kim had become popular with audiences.

By the end of the first season, ABC had decided to revamp the series into a new series. The final episode "Young Americans" was intended to serve as a backdoor pilot for a spin-off series of the same name. In the fifteenth episode "Notes from the Underground", Margaret moves into the basement of her parents' home, then moves out altogether in "Young Americans". The spin-off would have focused on Margaret and her roommates — Spencer (Diedrich Bader), Phil (Sam Seder), and Jimmy (Andrew Lowery) — plus Grandma Kim and Jane (Mariska Hargitay), a bartender at the roommates' hangout. The revamped concept was meant to emulate Friends, which had become a hit on rival network NBC that same season. Despite this retooling, ABC ultimately decided against ordering the revamped series.

== Legacy ==
Since the series' end, Cho has become outspoken about her time on the series, particularly the difficulties she faced with the network and the effects the series' failure had on her. Another attempt at bringing an Asian American family would not come until 2015, when ABC launched the much more successful Fresh Off the Boat. Footage from All-American Girl made a brief appearance in the ABC comedy series, where the characters poked fun at its faults. Cho later returned to ABC to guest star for another sitcom featuring an Asian American lead, Dr. Ken.

== Home media ==
The complete series was released on DVD in a four-disc set from Shout! Factory/Sony BMG Music Entertainment on January 31, 2006. The set features commentary by Cho (joined twice by Hill) on one episode per disc and retrospective interviews with Cho and Hill.

== See also ==
- Mr. T and Tina
- Fresh Off the Boat
- The Family Law
- Citizen Khan
- Kim's Convenience
- Awkwafina Is Nora from Queens
