= Darcy's Wild Life =

Teen sitcom

- Created by: Tim Maile; Douglas Tuber
- Starring: Sara Paxton; Natalie Radford; Andrew Chalmers; Kerry Michael Saxena; Shannon Collis; Kevin Symons; Melanie Leishman
- Opening theme: Darcy's Wild Life by Fan 3
- Countries of origin: United States; Canada
- Original language: English
- No. of seasons: 2
- No. of episodes: 33

Production
- Executive producers: Tim Maile; Douglas Tuber; Ivan Schneeberg; David Fortier; Stan Rogow
- Running time: 22 minutes
- Production companies: Discovery Communications; Temple Street Productions; Stan Rogow Productions

Original release
- Network: Discovery Kids (U.S.); Family Channel (CAN)
- Release: October 2, 2004 – March 18, 2006

Darcy's Wild Life is a teen sitcom starring Sara Paxton, and broadcast on Discovery Kids in the United States, and the Family Channel in Canada, from October 2004 to March 2006. The show also aired on NBC as part of the Discovery Kids on NBC programing block.

== Premise ==
The series revolved around Darcy Fields, the daughter of an eccentric actress Victoria Fields who decides to move away from Malibu to raise her daughter in a more normal environment. Darcy is slow to adjust to her new home in the country. She gets a job at a local veterinary clinic called Creature Comforts. The show is mostly about the humorous situations Darcy gets into while adjusting to her new surroundings.

The series title is a pun on the word "wildlife", which is the main theme of the show. The title refers to Darcy's eccentric life dealing with wildlife. Many episodes also had titles based on puns, such as "Puppy Love" (with puppies), "Swine Flew the Coop" (on swine flu), "Knockin' on Heaven's Doggie Door" (song "Knockin' on Heaven's Door") or "The Trouble with Truffles" (Star Trek's "Tribbles").

== Cast and characters ==
=== Main ===
- Sara Paxton as Darcy Fields: Darcy loves fashion and doesn't know too much about nature and is terrified of animals until she moves to what she calls "the middle of nowhere". She was born in a parking lot of her mother's movie premiere. She is always trying new things in this small little town. Darcy is also very girly at times and her favorite color is pink.
- Natalie Radford as Victoria Fields: Before she had Darcy, Victoria was a famous actress. She owns a farm house where she and Darcy live.
- Andrew Chalmers as Jack Adams: Jack is Lindsay's little brother. He craves fame, and is always trying to do something either to get money or fame.
- Kerry Michael Saxena as Eli: Eli is a sweet, clumsy boy, whom Lindsay likes. He works for Victoria and knows a lot about animals. He is always getting himself into some sticky situation.
- Shannon Collis as Lindsay Adams: She is one of Darcy's best friends, and is often the voice of reason for Darcy. Lindsay is a hard-working girl that works in her dad's vet/pet shop. She is the big sister of Jack. She has a crush on Eli, and sometimes is in a conflict with Darcy ("Nature vs. Nurture"). She dated Tyler in the episode,"My Fair Lindsay". Lindsay's a straight-A student. Her dream is to be a Marine Vet. Lindsay and Jack's mom died when they were little.
- Kevin Symons as Dr. Kevin Adams: Kevin is the vet at Creature Comforts. He is quite eccentric, but a kind and competent veterinarian and like a dad to Darcy. He often tells disturbing stories, particularly about bad incidents with gourmet food, which can annoy Darcy.
- Melanie Leishman as Kathi Giraldi: Another one of Darcy's best friends. She is naive and doesn't always stand up for herself. She is bubbly and often rambles on about random subjects. Kathi has a pug named Skittles, who doesn't really listen to her commands or follow her attempts to train him.

=== Recurring ===
- Daniel Karasik as Layne Haznoy
- Ashley Leggat as Brittany MacMillan
- Demetrius Joyette as Colt Brewster
- Stephanie Chantel Durelli as Kristen Doves
- Kayla Perlmutter as Chloe McKenna

== Episodes ==
=== Season 1 (2004–05) ===
No. overall	No. in season	Title	Directed by	Written by	Original release date
1	1	"Darcy's Wild Life"	Mel Damski	Douglas Tuber & Tim Maile	October 2, 2004
Darcy is alarmed to find her celebrity mother is giving up their glamorous lifestyle in Malibu and moving them both to a ranch in the country. She soon becomes attached to the many animals she encounters and makes new friends amongst the locals.
2	2	"Strange Critters"	Bradley Walsh	Douglas Tuber & Tim Maile	October 9, 2004
Layne has a crush on Darcy and she tries her best to discourage his interest while her mother Victoria and Eli battle a mole in the vegetable garden.
3	3	"A Chick Thing"	Chris Deacon	Tim Maile & Douglas Tuber	October 16, 2004
Darcy is determined to throw Cathy a memorable birthday party and include a working Lindsay by having it at her vet/pet shop but ends up with 200 chicks on the loose. Victoria and Eli give some hawk's eggs a fighting chance.
4	4	"Darcy's Mild Life"	Stacey Curtis	Rachelle Romberg	October 23, 2004
Darcy gets nipped by a dog at the vets and develops a case of hypochondria that may have more to do with subconsciously still resisting her countryside surroundings.
5	5	"Buffalo Gals"	Don McCutcheon	Douglas Tuber & Tim Maile	November 6, 2004
Kathi seeks advice on what to wear to her cousin's wedding and Darcy takes charge. A stray buffalo turns up and while looking after it Lindsay and Darcy's mother bond which begins to make Darcy jealous.
6	6	"Baron Von Chimpie"	Don McCutcheon	Douglas Tuber & Tim Maile	November 13, 2004
Baron von Chimpie, a retired performing chimpanzee, is having problems adapting to his new life and acting out, he's not the only one.
7	7	"Fan3's Company"	Bradley Walsh	Melissa Gould	December 4, 2004
Kathi, Lindsay and Darcy are to perform a skit at the Founder's Day picnic. When Darcy's hip hop star friend Fan 3 is due to visit at the same time as the picnic, she bails on her new friends. Victoria has a reindeer in her foyer and is not happy about it.
8	8	"Queen of the Rodeo"	Paul Fox	Amy Engelberg & Wendy Engelberg	December 11, 2004
When Darcy swoons over the handsome rodeo contestant Zack, she ends up entering into it to impress him. In every event. Jack ropes Victoria into a money making scheme exploiting he celebrity status in order to raise money for "charity".
9	9	"My Fair Lindsay"	Bradley Walsh	Christine Pietrosh & Jessica Goldstein	December 18, 2004
In order to help her catch the eye of Tyler, Darcy gives Lindsay a makeover. It works a little to well when the normally down to earth Lindsay gets carried away with her new fancy stylings.
10	10	"Two of Us Riding Nowhere"	Don McCutcheon	Douglas Tuber & Tim Maile	January 8, 2005
After old rival Jenny taunts Lindsay about beating her again in the upcoming horse trail rally, Darcy convinces her they should partner up to win the event but it turns out winning isn't everything.
11	11	"Crazy Like a Fox"	Chris Deacon	Tim Maile & Douglas Tuber	January 15, 2005
A camera crew want to do a piece on what Victoria's life is like now in the countryside. Victoria believes it could be a good chance to raise awareness for her foxes but to Darcy it's a chance to get a taste of glamour back in her life. However, when it becomes clear the reporter is only intent on making a hit piece, it's time to employ the local wildlife to help redress the balance.
12	12	"The Trouble with Truffles"	Bradley Walsh	Rachelle Romberg	February 19, 2005
Darcy is determined to make it to a nearby star studded film festival despite her mother saying no. When the devious Jack also wants to come along, the pair launch into a series of wheeling and dealing to make it happen. Darcy also learns there's a difference between a wood chip and a cow chip.
13	13	"Dog Tired"	Bradley Walsh	Tim Maile & Douglas Tuber	March 26, 2005
Darcy desperately wants to go on a skiing trip but lack of money is an issue. Jack offers to help arrange paying chores around town, for a ten percent commission. Darcy ends up working all hours to raise the cash.

=== Season 2 (2005–06) ===
No. overall	No. in season	Title	Directed by	Written by	Original release date
14	1	"Puppy Love"	Mel Damski	Rachelle Romberg	September 10, 2005
Darcy finds a stray dog and takes him in while awaiting the owner's return. The two quickly bond. When she encounters Kathi trying to train her recalcitrant pug Skittles for the upcoming dog agility trials, she decides to enter her new found canine friend now named "Bling". Jack's latest scheme is to find a dog to enter the trials in an attempt to win fame and fortune.
15	2	"Swine Flew the Coop"	Mel Damski	Douglas Tuber & Tim Maile	September 17, 2005
Darcy looks after Orville the pig and is pleased to hear that he's being entered into the county fair, unaware that winning means ending up on a dinner plate. A series of desperate attempts to save the periled porcine's life ensue. Jack and his friend Colt are on a treasure hunt after finding a map.
16	3	"Nature vs. Nurture"	Don McCutcheon	Rachelle Romberg	October 1, 2005
To his chagrin Jack has to join his dad on a weekend wilderness camp out, the "nature". While Darcy, Kathi and Lindsay arrange a girl's sleepover weekend while the guys are away, the "nurture". Though Darcy's contention that girls are all "sugar and spice" takes a knock when a game of truth or dare escalates and the morning pajama party degenerates into a food fight. While at the wilderness camp an encounter with a mountain lion makes Jack see his dad in a new light.
17	4	"Pig Whisperer"	Bradley Walsh	Christine Pietrosh & Jessica Goldstein	October 8, 2005
Darcy's fun with playing at having extrasensory perception turns serious when elderly Mrs. Hatch asks her to use her "powers" to advise whether longtime canine companion Duke needs to be "put to sleep". Jack learns what it's like to have an older brother when he elicits help birdwatching from Eli.
18	5	"Bear-Trapped"	David Warry-Smith	Douglas Tuber & Tim Maile	October 15, 2005
A hungry bear prowls outside trapping the gang in various buildings on the ranch, leaving Jack and Darcy alone to treat her injured horse Gus in the barn.
19	6	"Slightly Used"	Don McCutcheon	Douglas Tuber & Tim Maile	October 22, 2005
When "Ice Queen" Brittany shows interest in kind-hearted Eli, Darcy becomes suspicious of her motives. With Eli distracted by the attention, Darcy learns to milk the goats in his place.
20	7	"Pet Adoption Day"	Stacey Curtis	Rachelle Romberg	October 29, 2005
Pet Adoption Day sees the gang enthusiastically finding new homes for a selection of critters in need, Darcy however has too high a standard for prospective new owners.
21	8	"Yes I Can... Maybe"	Chris Deacon	Douglas Tuber & Tim Maile	November 5, 2005
Meek Kathi needs to become more assertive so the gang give her a crash course in being more confident. It proves very effective, too effective in fact. When Kathi's pet pug Skittles is diagnosed as being overweight, the new found over assertiveness moves from annoying to hazardous.
22	9	"Cuz in Trouble"	Don McCutcheon	Douglas Tuber & Tim Maile	November 12, 2005
Darcy looks after a miniature horse called Thunderbolt. Eli's city cousin Troy comes to visit. While Eli thinks he's the greatest, Troy is actually self important and obnoxious. Worse still his behaviour begins to rub off on Eli. Jack and Colt camp out over night to prevent a maple tree from being cut down.
23	10	"Thanksgiving"	Don McCutcheon	Douglas Tuber & Tim Maile	November 19, 2005
Darcy's rock star drummer father Rory Fields visits for thanksgiving, bearing a gift of a beaver. Rory has a habit of keeping his problems from his daughter but she is not a little child anymore. Jack and Colt try to write a song to impress Darcy's father.
24	11	"Bird in the Hand, Pain in the Neck"	Stefan Scaini	Rich Rinaldi & Dan Fybel	November 26, 2005
A parrot named Harpo is found abandoned at Creature Comforts and Darcy decides to adopt him, only to find out he's something of a menace. Colt's pet angelfish, Clarence, dies and Jack volunteers to arrange a wake for him, unusually for free.
25	12	"Knockin' on Heaven's Doggie Door"	Stacey Curtis	Douglas Tuber & Tim Maile	December 3, 2005
Darcy's young dog Sushi develops a health issue and needs surgery, leaving her with some difficult decisions to make. Jack and Colt receive a new game, Wizards and Warlocks, which leads to adventure as well as getting fellow classmate Chloe to be the princess.
26	13	"Git Along L'il Darcy"	Don McCutcheon	Douglas Tuber & Tim Maile	December 10, 2005
Darcy, Lindsay and Eli take part in a cattle drive only to discover their rival Brittany is also along to see them suffer. Trying to impress Chloe, Jack and Colt end up in a banana cream pie eating showdown.
27	14	"Wolf in the Fold"	Bradley Walsh	Douglas Tuber & Tim Maile	January 7, 2006
When a rescued and rehabilitated Wolf called Domingo escapes from care, Darcy and the gang set out to find him before a hunter who is determined to shoot him does. Jack and Colt's latest money making scheme is a car washing operation.
28	15	"Miss Directed"	Bradley Walsh	Douglas Tuber & Tim Maile	January 14, 2006
A placement test produces results that run counter to Lindsay's ambitions to be a veterinarian, sending her on an existential crisis at a golf course. Colt and Jack set up a web camera to watch the cows but decide the footage needs something more to pull in the viewers.
29	16	"Love in the Time of Kennel Cough"	Don McCutcheon	Douglas Tuber & Tim Maile	January 28, 2006
After one of their bicycles breaks down, Darcy, Lindsay and Kathi meet handsome and mysterious biker Jonah and his dog Bobo. Jonah fixes the bike and catches Darcy's interest. Jack talks Eli into a business photographing people's pets posed in clothing.
30	17	"Mystery Date"	Stefan Scaini	Douglas Tuber & Tim Maile	February 11, 2006
Lindsay has a secret admirer sending flowers and love notes, distracting her from the school report she is supposed to be working on. Colt and Jack notice athletes get special treatment so decide to teach themselves soccer, with poor results until Chloe reveals she plays and can teach them.
31	18	"Trash Talk"	Bruce McDonald	Douglas Tuber & Tim Maile	March 4, 2006
Kathi, Darcy and Lindsay are casually cleaning up litter from the countryside, lamenting the escalating problem. They decide to organise a more thorough solution themselves. So, roping in Eli and organised by the overly efficacious Lindsay, they set about on a rigidly efficient clean up. Getting very mucky in the process. Jack and Colt need a terrarium for a school project but Jack feels they need to think big.
32	19	"You Can Go Home Again"	Stefan Scaini	Douglas Tuber & Tim Maile	March 11, 2006
Victoria is offered her dream role, tempting her out of retirement. It means a return to the glitz and glamour of Hollywood, what Darcy had always wanted but does she still? Reminiscing about all that she's experienced coming to the countryside results in many flashbacks to past episodes.
33	20	"Oh for the Love of..."	Paul Fox	Douglas Tuber & Tim Maile	March 18, 2006
Kathi has a crush on classmate Arron Shaw, unfortunately she is near speechless in his presence. Darcy takes the situation in hand by coaching à la Cyrano de Bergerac, except for both parties. Jack and Colt discover a strange bug that could be an as yet unidentified species which may finally make them famous.

== Production ==
The series was filmed in Toronto, Canada, and many of the show's cast were Canadian. It was executive produced by Stan Rogow.

== Awards and nominations ==
Year	Award	Category	Nominee	Result	Refs
2005	26th Young Artist Awards	Best Performance in a TV Series (Comedy or Drama) Leading Young Actress	Sara Paxton	Won	
2005	26th Young Artist Awards	Best Family Television Series (Comedy)	Darcy's Wild Life	Won	
2006	27th Young Artist Awards	Best Young Ensemble Performance in a TV Series (Comedy or Drama)	Andrew Chalmers, Shannon Collis, Demetrius Joyette, Melanie Leishman, Sara Paxton and Kerry Michael Saxena	Won	
2006	33rd Daytime Emmy Awards	Outstanding Performer in a Children's Series	Sara Paxton	Won	
2006	16th Environmental Media Awards	Prize for children's live action television	Darcy's Wild Life, episode: "Trash Talk"	Won	
2007	28th Young Artist Awards	Best Young Ensemble Performance in a TV Series (Comedy or Drama)	Andrew Chalmers, Melanie Leishman, Demetrius Joyette and Kayla Perlmutter	Won	
2007	28th Young Artist Awards	Best Family Television Series (Comedy)	Darcy's Wild Life	Won	
2007	28th Young Artist Awards	Best Performance in a TV Series (Comedy or Drama) Supporting Young Actor	Andrew Chalmers	Won	

== Merchandise and other media ==
The series spawned a western-themed clothing line.

=== Soundtrack ===
A Soundtrack album was released to accompany the series on May 17, 2005, by BMG Strategic Marketing Group/BMG Heritage.

==== Track listing ====
1. "Take a Walk" – Sara Paxton
2. "I Love Your Smile" – Tiffany Evans
3. "Crazy Kinda Crush on You" – Nick Jonas
4. "Bam Boogie" – Bent Fabric
5. "We Need Some Money" – Chuck Brown & the Soul Searchers
6. "Hey Boy" – Fan 3
7. "Walking the Dog" – Rufus Thomas
8. "Monkey Man" – The Specials
9. "ABC" – American Juniors
10. "Walking on Sunshine" – Nikki Cleary
11. "Clothes Make the Girl" – Kristy Frank
12. "There for You" – Sara Paxton

=== Books ===
A tie-in series of books were published, written by various authors including Jory Simms, Laura J. Burns, Daniella Burr & Sierra Harimann.

1. Welcome to Where? by Jory Simms
2. A Chick Thing by Daniella Burr
3. A Fine State of Affairs by Laura J. Burns
4. Scout's Honor by Jory Simms
5. The Play's the Thing by Sierra Harimann
6. Go West, Darcy! by Laura J. Burns
7. Super Sweet Sixteen by Jory Simms
8. A Dog's Life by Daniella Burr
