= Best Friends Whenever =

American comedy television series

- Genre: Comedy
- Created by: Jed Elinoff & Scott Thomas
- Starring: Landry Bender; Lauren Taylor; Gus Kamp; Ricky Garcia; Benjamin Cole Royer; Matthew Lewis Royer
- Theme music composer: Mitch Allan; Mindy Robbins
- Opening theme: "Whenever" by Forever in Your Mind
- Composers: Eric Goldman; Ken Lofkoll
- Country of origin: United States
- Original language: English
- No. of seasons: 2
- No. of episodes: 30

Production
- Executive producers: Scott Thomas & Jed Elinoff; Michael B. Kaplan
- Producer: Julie Tsutsui
- Camera setup: Multi-camera
- Running time: 20–24 minutes
- Production companies: Diphthong Productions; Entertainment Force; It's a Laugh Productions

Original release
- Network: Disney Channel
- Release: June 26, 2015 – December 11, 2016

Best Friends Whenever is an American comedy television series created by Jed Elinoff and Scott Thomas that premiered on Disney Channel on June 26, 2015. Its final episode aired on December 11, 2016, after two seasons. The series stars Landry Bender, Lauren Taylor, Gus Kamp, Ricky Garcia, Benjamin Cole Royer, and Matthew Lewis Royer.

== Premise ==
Set in Portland, Oregon, two teenage girls named Cyd and Shelby are best friends living together while Cyd's parents are on an archaeological dig in Peru. After an accident in their neighbor Barry's science lab, they are given the ability to travel in time, provided they are thinking of the time they want to go to and are touching. When it comes to their trips to the future, they briefly find themselves strapped to tables in a futuristic lab and must figure out what this means while having various adventures along the way.

== Cast and characters ==
The main characters, from left to right: Chet, Barry, Cyd, Shelby, Naldo, and Bret.

=== Main ===
- Landry Bender as Cyd Ripley, Shelby's best friend who is staying with Shelby's family while her parents are away in Peru. She owns a pet dog named Diesel.
- Lauren Taylor as Shelby Marcus, Cyd's best friend.
- Gus Kamp as Barry Eisenberg, an aspiring young scientist who lives in a Winnebago that is parked outside of Shelby's backyard that he also uses for his lab. One of his lasers deflecting off a cup of chemicals gave Cyd and Shelby the ability to travel through time.
- Ricky Garcia as Naldo Montoya, Barry's best friend and lab assistant. Barry calls him "Renaldo".
- Benjamin Cole Royer as Bret Marcus, Shelby's younger brother who is the twin brother of Chet.
- Matthew Lewis Royer as Chet Marcus, Shelby's younger brother who is the twin brother of Bret.

=== Recurring ===
- Mary Passeri as Astrid, the mother of Shelby, Bret, and Chet.
- Kevin Symons as Norm, the father of Shelby, Bret, and Chet. He works as an accountant at GloboDigiDyne and later gets promoted to the company's Pelican Ball Room.
- Madison Hu as Marci, a friend of Cyd and Shelby who is always relaxed.
- Larry Joe Campbell as Mr. Doyle, a gossip-loving teacher at West Portland High School who teaches science and driver's education.
- Nora Dunn as Janet Smythe, an entrepreneur and the CEO of GloboDigiDyne who has invented many things in her life, starting with wireless objects. However, she is an evil mastermind who seeks to hunt down Cyd and Shelby and plans to figure out their time travel abilities and alter time so that she can take over the country. She is eventually defeated by future Cyd and Shelby and taken away by them to be imprisoned with other people like her.
- Bryana Salaz as Daisy, a time-displaced princess from the 1500s who ended up in Cyd and Shelby's time. Whenever Cyd and Shelby do a group hug with her, Cyd and Shelby end up briefly transported back in time to where Daisy is imprisoned by an unidentified person. During her time in the present, she lives with Naldo while trying to adapt to modern day cultures. It was later revealed that the unidentified person had trapped Daisy in the tower to keep her from being taken by Sebastian.

== Production ==
Best Friends Whenever was created by Jed Elinoff and Scott Thomas, who have also created Randy Cunningham: 9th Grade Ninja. On March 6, 2015, Disney ordered Best Friends Whenever with production starting the same month. The series was renewed for a second season by Disney Channel on February 29, 2016. The second season premiered on July 25, 2016. In February 2017, the cast took to social media to report that the series had not been renewed for a third season. On June 30, 2017, TV by the Numbers reported that the series had been canceled.

== Episodes ==
=== Series overview ===
Season	Episodes	Originally released	
Season	Episodes	First released	Last released
1	18	June 26, 2015	May 22, 2016
2	12	July 25, 2016	December 11, 2016

=== Season 1 (2015–16) ===
No. overall	No. in season	Title	Directed by	Written by	Original release date	Prod. code	U.S. viewers (millions)
1	1	"A Time to Travel"	Shelley Jensen	Jed Elinoff & Scott Thomas	June 26, 2015	101	3.54
Cyd moves in to live with her best friend Shelby while Cyd's parents are out of the country. On their first day of school since moving in together, Cyd and Shelby are accidentally zapped by Barry's experimental machine, giving them the power to time travel. When Shelby's elaborate plan to ask Cameron to the dance fails, she and Cyd hug while wishing she could start all over. Suddenly, the girls find themselves back to that morning, realizing that they have traveled back in time. Shelby gets a do-over to ask Cameron out but it fails again and Cameron thinks it was Cyd asking. When the girls hug, they travel two years into the future only to learn that Cyd moved out and they haven't been friends since the Cameron incident. Cyd and Shelby realize that despite their differences, they're better together. They hug and find themselves back to that morning. This time round, Shelby decides not to ask Cameron out because no boy is more important than her friendship with Cyd. The girls also discover that they time travel if they think of a time while hugging or touching each other. Guest stars: Madison Hu as Marci, Emery Kelly as Cameron
2	2	"A Time to Cheat"	Shelley Jensen	Jed Ellinoff & Scott Thomas	July 12, 2015	102	2.02
Shelby and Cyd are nervously studying for a test but they keep accidentally traveling forward in time to the test, unprepared. The girls conclude that they keep doing it because they can't stop touching each other. So, Cyd convinces Shelby to use their time travel power to get the test questions and use them as a study guide. They pass the test but Shelby feels so guilty that she develops a stress rash. Cyd apologizes for pressuring Shelby into cheating. To make things right, they travel back in time to tell the teacher that the test leaked. Meanwhile, Barry and Naldo experiment on Bret and Chet in an attempt to replicate time travel. One of the experiments goes wrong and burns off Barry's eyebrows. Guest star: Jocelyn Ayanna as Ms. Nesbit
3	3	"A Time to Say Thank You"	Shelley Jensen	Michael B. Kaplan	July 19, 2015	103	1.96
Cyd wants to show her gratitude to Shelby's family for letting her live with them. She intends to do something big that involves fire, but after traveling into the future, she's disappointed to find out that a fire almost burned down their house. She begins to doubt herself, saying that she doesn't really belong with the family. Shelby tries to cheer her up by using a candle to demonstrate how Cyd is the one who brings light to their family. Cyd is not impressed and throws the candle into the trash can. It turns out, it was the candle that started the fire that Cyd and Shelby saw after all. Meanwhile, Barry realizes that he should start thanking Naldo for helping him in the lab. Guest stars: Mary Passeri as Astrid, Kevin Symons as Norm
4	4	"A Time to Jump and Jam"	Shelley Jensen	Debby Wolfe	July 26, 2015	104	2.01
When Cyd's dog Diesel gets into Cyd's laundry, he finds Cyd's favorite food: a pizza-slam-rito, which were banned by the health board in 7th grade. Cyd suggests that they jump back and get one. Shelby tries to talk her out of it, but Cyd can't be swayed. When Shelby "gives up", the two try to jump back to 7th grade, but their powers aren't working. When they go to Barry, Shelby reveals that she was "jamming their jump" because she didn't want to go. Cyd, refusing to give up, tries to surprise Shelby so they will jump. Eventually, she does so, and the past reveals a secret that hurts Cyd. Guest stars: Eryn Pablico as Jen, Jocelyn Ayanna as Ms. Nesbit
5	5	"A Time to Rob and Slam"	Shelley Jensen	Jim Hope	August 9, 2015	105	1.87
Shelby's science teacher Mr. Doyle pairs her up with a student called The Rob. When the Rob is being a jerk, Cyd trains Shelby to slam him. Shelby finally succeeds, but feels bad. Mr. Doyle, who loves the hot gossip, tells the two that the Rob wasn't always a jerk, he became a jerk when some mean girl didn't return his romantic feelings. Cyd and Shelby jump back to try to get Rob the girl, and Cyd discovers that Shelby turned him down. Guest stars: Larry Joe Campbell as Mr. Doyle, Randy J. Goodwin as Vance Carroway, Madison Hu as Marci, Brendan Meyer as The Rob Absent: Benjamin Cole Royer as Bret, Matthew Lewis Royer as Chet
6	6	"The Butterscotch Effect"	Shelley Jensen	Steve Jarczak & Shawn Thomas	August 16, 2015	106	1.67
Cyd and Shelby go back in time to help Barry meet his idol. When they make it so Barry does that, they return to find that Barry has started a rock band because his idol ridiculed his theories, causing Cyd and Shelby to correct it; however, when they return to the present again, they find that Barry is an evil genius, and they go back to see that this is because they caused something else that made Barry and Naldo not meet. Guest stars: Stephen Full as Ray, Kevin Symons as Norm, Mary Passeri as Astrid, Ernie Kamp as Young Barry
7	7	"Shake Your Booty"	Victor Gonzalez	Jed Elinoff & Scott Thomas	August 23, 2015	107	2.03
When Shelby and Cyd are assigned an essay on disco for English class, they decide to jump back to the '70s to give them some ideas. But when they accidentally split up, the girls begin to forget each other which causes Cyd turning into a punk-like jock and Shelby a part of the disco gang as a part of being against punks. Meanwhile, having discovered that Shelby and Cyd are in danger of losing each other as well as the possibility of never getting back home, Barry and Naldo try everything to save them before it's too late. Guest stars: Ben Giroux as Mr. Canavan, Mollee Gray as Roller Girl Absent: Benjamin Cole Royer as Bret, Matthew Lewis Royer as Chet
8	8	"Back to the Future Lab" "Jump to the Future Lab"	Shelley Jensen	Michael B. Kaplan	September 20, 2015	108	2.09
Shelby and Cyd discover a strange logo all throughout Barry's lab that has a tie with their brief future experiences. Upon identifying the logo, they infiltrate the company GloboDigiDyne, where Shelby's father supposedly works. Meanwhile, Bret and Chet think that Cyd and Shelby are detectives and follow them into GloboDigiDyne at the same time when the company's CEO, Janet Smythe, is testing the new robots. Special guest star: Nora Dunn as Janet Smythe Guest star: Kevin Symons as Norm
9	9	"Cyd and Shelby's Haunted Escape"	Victor Gonzalez	Jim Martin	October 4, 2015	109	2.18
Special guest stars: Rowan Blanchard as Riley Matthews, Peyton Meyer as Lucas Friar Absent: Benjamin Cole Royer as Bret, Matthew Lewis Royer as Chet
10	10	"When Shelby Met Cyd"	Victor Gonzalez	Jim Hope	October 25, 2015	110	1.76
After Cyd and Shelby return from the trip to their kindergarten years, things start going wrong when they begin de-aging due to never having time traveled to when they were that young. Barry and Naldo must help them by getting them to drink a lot of milk. However, while it works on Shelby, it does not work on Cyd. It turns out that Cyd was scared of growing up. After a pep talk from Shelby, all ends well. Guest stars: Larry Joe Campbell as Mr. Doyle, Lauren Lindsey Donzis as 9yr old Cyd, Amiah Miller as 9yr old Shelby Absent: Benjamin Cole Royer as Bret, Matthew Lewis Royer as Chet
11	11	"Cyd and Shelby Strike Back"	Shannon Flynn and Shelley Jensen	Steve Jarczak & Shawn Thomas and Jim Martin	November 27, 2015	111–112	1.72
Cyd and Shelby discover that Janet Smythe is the one behind the future lab and seek to get rid of the lab and GloboDigiDyne. With Barry and Naldo's help, and an unauthorized biography of Janet, the girls find out Janet came up with the idea of wireless technology after being shocked by her desk lamp in 1991. When they plan to prevent Janet from coming up with GloboDigiDyne, the results will not be as they expected. Special guest star: Nora Dunn as Janet Smythe Guest stars: Kevin Symons as Norm, Madison Hu as Marci, Tamela D'Amico as Young Janet Absent: Benjamin Cole Royer as Bret, Matthew Lewis Royer as Chet
12	12	"The Girls of Christmas Past"	David Kendall	Kevin Engelking & Sarah Jeanne Terry	December 6, 2015	114	1.33
Cyd is feeling guilty on Christmas Eve that Shelby's gifts are always a lot better and jumps in bed with Shelby in order to jump back to a year earlier before she moved in. Cyd does her best to keep Shelby from finding out that they jumped while Shelby was sleeping; however, Shelby eventually finds out. Meanwhile, against Naldo's wishes, Barry performs an experiment and causes a war between Bret's group and Chet's group. However, he later realizes that what he did was wrong and apologizes. His apology is accepted, but he ends up being tied up in Christmas lights. Guest stars: Kevin Symons as Norm, Mary Passeri as Astrid
13	13	"A Time to Double Date"	Robbie Countryman	Debby Wolfe	February 21, 2016	113	1.64
Guest stars: Mary Passeri as Astrid, JT Neal as Drake, Jay Jay Warren as Joaquin
14	14	"Jump to the '50s"	Shelley Jensen	Loni Steele Sosthand	March 20, 2016	115	1.61
Shelby's adventurous Grandma Rita comes to visit where Astrid makes a claim that she had encountered time-travelers during her youth who set her up with Shelby's future grandfather Paul. This causes Cyd and Shelby to jump to 1958 to investigate and bring Grandma Rita and Grandpa Paul together. Meanwhile, Barry works to raise money when his parents plan to sell his RV. When he learns the buyer was a jewel thief, he and Naldo try to find the jewels to buy the RV from his parents. Special guest star: Marion Ross as Grandma Rita Guest stars: Mary Passeri as Astrid, Anna Grace Barlow as Rita, Garrett Westton as Paul, Casey Campbell as Vesper Absent: Benjamin Cole Royer as Bret, Matthew Lewis Royer as Chet
15	15	"Diesel Gets Lost in Time"	Shelley Jensen	Jim Hope	April 17, 2016	116	1.55
Barry creates a time traveling chip, however Diesel accidentally eats it. After he ruins Shelby's video chat with Drake, Shelby yells at him to disappear, which he does in front of her. Shelby alerts Cyd, and the two go the lab. Barry gives them a time tracker that he invented along with the chip, which allows the girls to see in which timeline Diesel is in. Barry warns them that they have to find Diesel before he passes the chip, otherwise he will be stuck in the timeline he was in forever. They see that he jumped back a day, however they run into another problem when they run into the Diesel from that timeline and Shelby's dad. They later find him in a club from the day before, but they are attacked by two German Shepherds. Upon climbing into a dumpster, Cyd begins to cry over possibly losing Diesel forever. Just as they are about to give up, the two Diesels (Diesel from the present and Diesel from that timeline) come to save them and scare the German Shepherds off. The girls go back to the present bringing Diesel with them. They later find themselves back ion the future lab, however they are not strapped to the tables, and Cyd has punched the guy who was removing their powers. Shelby tries to jump back, however, Cyd decides to take off the guy's helmet, who is revealed to be Barry. Guest stars: Madison Hu as Marci, Kevin Symons as Norm, JT Neal as Drake, Justin Lopez as Griff
16	16	"Fight the Future: Part 1"	Shannon Flynn	Steve Jarczak & Shawn Thomas	May 8, 2016	117	1.33
Upon finding out that Barry was the one who attempted to remove their powers, Shelby and Cyd question him. Barry reveals that the girls had asked him to remove their powers for unknown reasons. Shelby and Cyd time travel into the future, only to learn their school has turned into a 'Dystopian Smythe-averse'. When Cyd goes off to look around while Shelby stays to talk with Drake, Cyd learns Drake is working for Janet Smythe and has frozen Barry and Naldo in suspended animation. Drake tells Shelby about Janet Smythe's inventions and the fact that she came to the school to watch a clock being installed. The girls get caught by Janet Smythe and try to jump back, only to learn Janet Smythe implanted a time travel blocker inside the school building. Shelby figures out the time travel blocker was placed in the clock. Meanwhile, Janet calls security to take the girls to suspended animation, when Cyd starts yelling at Shelby as she's been too obsessed with Drake the past day. They get into an argument and each get weapons, but throw them at the clock and jump back to the present. After Cyd tells Shelby how she truly feels, Shelby breaks up with Drake. Special guest star: Nora Dunn as Janet Smythe Guest stars: Madison Hu as Marci, JT Neal as Drake Absent: Benjamin Cole Royer as Bret, Matthew Lewis Royer as Chet
17	17	"Fight the Future: Part 2"	Jon Rosenbaum	Michael B. Kaplan	May 15, 2016	118	1.63
Janet Smythe invites herself to the Marcus' house for dinner, and Shelby and Cyd grow suspicious. They learn Janet Smythe created a tachyometer to track where Shelby and Cyd have time travelled. They jump back to before Janet Smythe came over, however, they learn she remembers every timeline she has been in, so the girls go to GloboDigiDyne with Barry and ask him to remove their powers. They learn that they only made things worse by giving away their powers, and they are powerless against Janet Smythe's inevitable future. Special guest star: Nora Dunn as Janet Smythe Guest stars: Kevin Symons as Norm, Mary Passeri as Astrid
18	18	"Fight the Future: Part 3"	Jon Rosenbaum	Jed Elinoff & Scott Thomas	May 22, 2016	119	1.23
Janet Smythe confiscates Barry's lab equipment and takes Barry and Naldo hostage – for the secret to time travel. Shelby and Cyd look around Barry's lab for ways to help him and figure out the secret to time travel – they figure out a blue liquid gave them the ability. While trying to save Barry and Naldo, Shelby accidentally gives away the secret to Janet and she gets the ability to time travel, moreover Janet gets security to take them all to suspended animation. Meanwhile, Bret and Chet turn Barry's RV into an "exclusive" nightclub. As Norm enters the room where Cyd and Shelby are being held, he accuses them of lying and gives them a stern warning, but soon after realizes they were telling the truth and apologizes, then fights off the guards. Shelby and Cyd try to block Janet's time travels and end up fighting her with their time travel abilities. The battle gets rid of Janet's powers, but also creates a time rift, which future Cyd and Shelby jump out of and fight away Janet's goons. Future Cyd and Shelby win the battle and take Janet and the blue liquid back through the time rift, the timeline resets and nobody remembers apart from Cyd and Shelby. Later at Barry's lab, the girls tell Barry and Naldo the secret to time travel was the blue liquid, which turned out to be Naldo's old homemade hair gel. At the end of the episode, the time rift reopens and it looks like someone is trying to get through it. Special guest star: Nora Dunn as Janet Smythe Guest stars: Kevin Symons as Norm, Mary Passeri as Astrid, Stephanie Brait as Future Cyd, Brooke Newton as Future Shelby

=== Season 2 (2016) ===
No. overall	No. in season	Title	Directed by	Written by	Original release date	Prod. code	U.S. viewers (millions)
19	1	"Princess Problems"	Bob Koherr	Jed Elinoff & Scott Thomas	July 25, 2016	201	1.18
Cyd and Shelby start the new semester off nicely, but then a time rift opens up from 1522 and a girl is let out, introducing herself as Daisy. The boys and girls compete to open the rift first for Daisy. Daisy reveals she's a princess, and that her parents died when she was 12. In numerous attempts to open the rift for Daisy, Barry and Naldo end up blowing up the RV. They go to the school, where Shelby realizes that Daisy and the rift are like Mr. Doyle and his mother, because his mother "kicks him out and then pulls him back in". The girls realize that Daisy is a prisoner, and they give her the choice to stay with them or go back to 1522. She decides to stay but the rift tries to pull her back through, however, the friends manage to free her. In the new garage lab that Barry's parents built, when Daisy, Shelby, and Cyd hug, Cyd and Shelby are teleported to what seems like Daisy's tower. Guest stars: Bryana Salaz as Daisy, Larry Joe Campbell as Mr. Doyle Absent: Benjamin Cole Royer as Bret, Matthew Lewis Royer as Chet
20	2	"Worst Night Whenever"	Bob Koherr	Jennifer Glickman	July 26, 2016	202	1.12
Cyd and Shelby jump back to the night of their sixth grade dance in an attempt to fix everything that went wrong; Naldo ripping his pants, Barry being locked in the janitor's closet, and the girls' choreographed dance being ruined by a power outage. Shelby is sent to look for Barry, but the pressure of sixth grade bullies starts to get to her and she ends up accidentally locking herself in the closet with him. Cyd keeps an eye on Naldo, and when she is made fun of by the bullies she comes to realize that there's nothing to be afraid of. When it comes time to finally do their dance, Shelby tries to cut the power and the truth is revealed -- in the original timeline, Cyd was the reason the power went out. In the end, the girls decide to do their dance, and its a hit. Meanwhile, Chet and Bret argue about having a neighborhood friend over after their father explicitly tells them not to let anyone into the house while he and Astrid are out for dinner. Guest stars: Kevin Symons as Norm, Will Babbitt as Neil, Madison Horcher as Bianca
21	3	"Epic Girls' Day"	Victor Gonzalez	Erin Dunlap	July 27, 2016	204	1.24
Cyd and Shelby decide to take Daisy to the mall for their epic girls day, however the things they used to do are only for two people. Problems occur when both Cyd and Shelby are left feeling like the third wheel. Meanwhile, Bret and Chet want a new look, and Barry and Naldo disagree about how to sell Naldo's novelty T-shirts. Guest stars: Mary Passeri as Astrid, Bryana Salaz as Daisy
22	4	"Girl Code"	Bob Koherr	Jim Martin	July 28, 2016	203	1.39
When Barry is too busy to help Shelby create a website for her crafting hobby, he suggests that she visit his friend Alex at the school's Computer Club. Shelby is surprised to find that Alex is a girl, but is even more surprised by the fact that she would rather teach Shelby how to code than simply make the website for her. Shelby instead decided to turn to two other members of the club, who quickly develop crushes on her. The situation is only made worse by the fact that Shelby is completely clueless, and gives them relationship advice that causes the two boys to fight for her love. Meanwhile, Cyd uses time travel to win a contest. When the prize turns out to be a boat, she and Naldo try to hide it before Shelby returns home. However, Naldo soon discovers a captain's hat in the boat, which causes him to sabotage Cyd's attempts to get rid of the prize. Guest stars: Leah Lewis as Alex, Niles Fitch as Elliot, Eric Osovsky as Reboot
23	5	"Derby Little Secret"	Victor Gonzalez	Rick Williams & Jenna McGrath	July 29, 2016	205	1.26
After Cyd suggests that she and Shelby go to a roller derby against Astrid's wishes, things get complicated when they get caught and discover a hidden secret. Upon Astrid getting injured in the process during the match, Cyd and Shelby jump back in order to keep Astrid from getting hurt; however, since her parents are still in Peru, Cyd starts feeling incredibly guilty from sneaking out and is not sure if she wants to confess what she did to Astrid. Meanwhile, after Daisy reveals that she can make people knights, Barry and Naldo put their prank war on hold and compete against one another to earn their new title. Guest stars: Mary Passeri as Astrid, Bryana Salaz as Daisy
24	6	"Night of the Were-Diesel"	Jon Rosenbaum	Rick Williams & Jenna McGrath	October 2, 2016	211	1.36
Cyd's plans of helping Shelby with their school's Halloween carnival backfire when her dog Diesel gets into Barry's “concentrated, experimental” wolf hormone and gets the serum on her, thus transforming Cyd into a werewolf. With her best friend now as part-lycanth, Shelby turns to Barry and Naldo for help in order to try and help bring Cyd back to normal before her transformation is forever permanent.
25	7	"The Friendship Code"	Shannon Flynn	Jennifer Glickman	October 3, 2016	208	1.20
Shelby and Barry compete against each other at a tech fair that's being held in their school as well by Shelby's hero: Dax Fraggins. But after Shelby is selected and learns that Dax is only trying to get rid of her including taking over her website, Barry struggles to warn Shelby and tries to tell her before it's too late. Feeling like she doesn't have a passion like everyone else in the group, Cyd tries to search for hers with Naldo's help but it only proves to be more difficult than she originally thought. Special guest star: Jason Earles as Dax Fraggins Absent: Benjamin Cole Royer as Bret, Matthew Lewis Royer as Chet
26	8	"The Lying Game"	Victor Gonzalez	Molly Haldeman & Camilla Rubis	October 4, 2016	206	1.05
During a friendship game with Barry and Naldo, a secret referring to Cyd leaving Shelby while she was sick to a concert escalates into an argument between them...putting their friendship on the line. Hoping to make it up to Shelby, Cyd tries letting Shelby go to a concert without her to test if it'll make them "even" but without her with Shelby, Cyd begins to feel like she isn't her best friend anymore. Guest star: Will Babbitt as Neil
27	9	"Working Nine to Fudge"	Shelley Jensen	Molly Haldeman & Camilla Rubis	October 5, 2016	210	1.25
Shelby decides that it's time for her and Cyd to get their first jobs. After interviewing at every store in the mall, the girls stumble upon a new fudge kiosk. Cyd is quick to impress the manager with her knowledge of dessert, and he offers them both jobs. Shelby grows jealous, however, when it becomes clear that Cyd is the star employee and she's stuck on cleaning duty. Things take a turn for the worse when Shelby comes to discover that their boss is secretly a burglar, with plans to rob stores in the mall. She's sent undercover by the police, and the girls end up using their time travel abilities to save the day. Meanwhile, Naldo helps Barry get in touch with his inner poet when his poor grades in poetry class threaten to derail his grade point average. After many failed attempts at accessing Barry's feelings, he channels his anger about poetry to compose a poem about his friendship with Naldo. Guest stars: Stephen Ellis as Jordan, Nika Williams as Zoe Absent: Benjamin Cole Royer as Bret, Matthew Lewis Royer as Chet
28	10	"It's Not Ye, It's Me"	Shannon Flynn	Jim Martin	October 6, 2016	207	1.04
When Daisy reveals to Cyd and Shelby that she has engaged to someone in her time that she despises, they offer to help her jump to her time to break it off, but it only puts their lives at greater risks. Meanwhile, Daisy joins Barry and Naldo in their games in the lab, but somehow wins every time. When Barry realizes he keeps losing to Daisy, he soon discovers his true feelings for her, in a way similar to his former love with Marci. Guest stars: Bryana Salaz as Daisy, Barrett Carnahan as Sebastian, Joe Ochman as Ulrich Absent: Benjamin Cole Royer as Bret, Matthew Lewis Royer as Chet
29	11	"The Christmas Curse"	Shelley Jensen	Erin Dunlap	December 4, 2016	209	0.95
It's the Marcus family's turn to host yearly neighborhood Christmas party, and Shelby is determined for everything to go perfectly so she can impress one of their popular neighbors. When Cyd and Shelby accidentally break Daisy's traditional Christmas goat, however, they find themselves put under a Christmas curse. Everything starts to go wrong at the party, from the tree lights burning out to Shelby's keyboard playing fart sounds and Norm falling off the roof. The girls believe that the curse has even caused them to lose their time travel abilities! Meanwhile, Bret and Chet set out for revenge against Santa for gifting them socks the previous Christmas. When they head to the mall, they mistake Naldo, who is dressed up as Santa, for the real deal and kidnap him. Barry goes to the mall to bring Naldo a bag of presents he forgot in the lab, and is forced to fill in as the mall Santa. While Bret and Chet torture Naldo, Barry learns to like children as they ask him for scientific Christmas gifts. Guest stars: Kevin Symons as Norm, Mary Passeri as Astrid, Bryana Salaz as Daisy, Briella Barbusca as Krissi
30	12	"Revenge of the Past"	Jon Rosenbaum	Jed Elinoff & Scott Thomas	December 11, 2016	212–213	0.94
Guest stars: Bryana Salaz as Daisy, Barrett Carnahan as Sebastian, Rosalind Ayres as Lucinda

== Broadcast ==
The series aired on Disney Channel in Canada. It premiered on Disney Channel in Australia and New Zealand on October 16, 2015.

== Reception ==
=== Critical ===
Brian Lowry, writing for Variety, thought the series' pilot episode was formulaic and did not take full advantages of the time travel premise. In particular, the series "appears more content to focus on the humdrum details of Shelby and Cyd's frantic lives than, say, sending them back to meet Abraham Lincoln or ahead to a time of flying cars."

=== Ratings ===
Viewership and ratings per season of Best Friends Whenever
Season	Episodes	First aired		Last aired		Avg. viewers (millions)
Season	Episodes	Date	Viewers (millions)	Date	Viewers (millions)	Avg. viewers (millions)
1	18	June 26, 2015	3.54	May 22, 2016	1.23	1.84
2	12	July 25, 2016	1.18	December 11, 2016	0.94	1.17
