= Richie Rich (2015 TV series) =

2015 American television series

- Genre: Comedy; Teen Sitcom
- Based on: Richie Rich by: Alfred Harvey; Warren Kremer
- Developed by: Brian Robbins; Jeff Hodsden
- Starring: Jake Brennan; Brooke Wexler; Kiff VandenHeuvel; Lauren Taylor; Joshua Carlon; Jenna Ortega
- Composer: Gary S. Scott
- Country of origin: United States
- Original language: English
- No. of seasons: 2
- No. of episodes: 21

Production
- Executive producers: Brian Robbins; Jeff Hodsden; Shauna Phelan; Joe Davola
- Producer: Don Dunn
- Camera setup: Multi-camera
- Running time: 23 minutes
- Production company: AwesomenessTV

Original release
- Network: Netflix
- Release: February 20 – May 22, 2015

Richie Rich is an American sitcom television series produced by DreamWorks Animation's AwesomenessTV for Netflix. The show is loosely based upon the Harvey Comics character of the same name, with Jake Brennan playing the eponymous character. However, all of the original characters (except for Richie and Irona) were replaced with a new supporting cast. The first season, consisting of 10 episodes, was released on February 20, 2015, followed by the second and final season of 11 episodes on May 22 the same year. The series was removed from Netflix on May 22, 2025, exactly ten years after the second season was released. The series received negative reviews from critics.

== Plot ==
Richie Rich is a previously ordinary boy who became a trillionaire after inventing a way to turn vegetables into a reproducible clean energy source. Richie now lives with his family in a mansion, and his best friends Darcy and Murray are always by his side. Darcy loves spending Richie's money whereas Murray works as his money manager and encourages Richie to be more responsible with his wealth. Also accompanying Richie are his robot maid Irona, his dim-witted father Cliff, and his jealous older sister Harper.

== Cast ==
=== Main characters ===
- Jake Brennan as Richie Rich, a child trillionaire.
- Brooke Wexler as Irona, Richie's robotic maid.
- Kiff VandenHeuvel as Cliff Rich, Richie's unemployed and naively childish father.
- Lauren Taylor as Harper Rich, Richie's older sister who dreams of attending Harvard University and is jealous of Richie's success.
- Joshua Carlon as Murray, Richie's neurotic money manager and best friend, who does not like Darcy taking Richie's money and spending it.
- Jenna Ortega as Darcy, Richie's other best friend, who encourages bad habits and spends money from Richie without his knowledge.

=== Recurring characters ===
- Ysa Penarejo as Tulip Steinhoff, Harper's optimistic but unintelligent childhood friend.
- Nathan Anderson as Tahj Stokes ("T-Nice"), the teenage son of famous rapper "Bulldozah" and friend of Richie with an unrequited crush on Harper.
- Peter Glennon as Swedish House Sensation (real name Rebecca), once a popular DJ from Sweden, but is later hired by Richie as a personal meatball chef.

== Production ==
The show was produced by AwesomenessTV, which had recently been acquired by DreamWorks alongside Classic Media, a private-equity company for holding dormant intellectual properties, including Richie Rich. The TV adaptation of Richie Rich was originally to be uploaded to YouTube and shot with a matching budget. Netflix executives visited the set one day, and a month later it was picked up by the company.

The series was announced in October 2014 as part of an ongoing partnership between Netflix and DreamWorks Animation, in which DreamWorks will create 300 hours of original programming for the service. Unlike the comics, where the lead character comes from a wealthy family, Richie Rich has a self-made fortune from an innovative green technology. The series follows his adventures with his new wealth. Brian Robbins (co-founder and CEO of DreamWorks Animation-owned AwesomenessTV), Tim Pollock and Jeff Hodsden (The Suite Life of Zack & Cody) are the executive producers and showrunners. Additionally, AwesomenessTV's Shauna Phelan and Joe Davola serve as executive producers on the series.

== Episodes ==
=== Series overview ===
| Season | Episodes | Originally released |
|---|---|---|
| 1 | 10 | February 20, 2015 |
| 2 | 11 | May 22, 2015 |

=== Season 1 (2015) ===
| No. overall | No. in season | Title | Directed by | Written by | Original release date |
|---|---|---|---|---|---|
| 1 | 1 | "Man$ion Warming" | Phill Lewis | Tim Pollock & Jeff Hodsden | February 20, 2015 |
One week after moving into his mansion, Richie is happy with his new trillionaire life, but Murray thinks he's spending too much money. After Darcy gets injured in an accident involving Richie's pet sharks, the trio have to cancel their plans to see famous DJ Swedish House Sensation. Richie makes it up to her by inviting the DJ to perform at his house instead, only for Cliff to decide on having family game night on the same day. To avoid letting anyone down, Richie attempts to be in two places at once.
| 2 | 2 | "Royal Flu$h" | Joel Zwick | Jeny Quine | February 20, 2015 |
Richie's homework is to write a report on a foreign country. Together with Darcy and Murray, they plan to visit the tropical island nation of Lupitiongo, only to be informed that it has sunk. The islanders request refuge in Richie's house, which he reluctantly agrees to on the condition that he is named king. However, running a country is harder than he realises.
| 3 | 3 | "The $et Up" | Joel Zwick | Tim Pollock & Jeff Hodsden | February 20, 2015 |
When Cliff's smothering level of attention drives Richie and Harper crazy, they set him up on a date while Darcy and Murray enlist in training to become Richie's personal bodyguards.
| 4 | 4 | "The Wonderful Thing$ He Doe$" | Adam Weissman | Tim Pollock & Jeff Hodsden | February 20, 2015 |
Richie tries to get out of doing a book report on The Wizard of Oz by directing a movie starring Darcy, Murray, Irona and their neighbor Tahj, but it quickly spirals out of control.
| 5 | 5 | "The Madne$$ of Queen Harper" | Adam Weissman | Tim Pollock & Jeff Hodsden | February 20, 2015 |
Cliff goes to a Fantasy Football draft, leaving Harper in charge of the house. When Richie is invited to famous basketballer Khalil Woods' birthday party, Harper has other plans.
| 6 | 6 | "More or Le$$" | Adam Weissman | Tim Pollock & Jeff Hodsden | February 20, 2015 |
After Richie is fed up from Darcy and Murray constantly arguing about money, he decides to make them switch roles for a month. Meanwhile, Harper struggles to get Cliff to approve her date.
| 7 | 7 | "$nowball Effect$" | Adam Weissman | Tim Pollock & Jeff Hodsden | February 20, 2015 |
Murray starts acting like a penguin after getting frozen in Antarctica. Meanwhile, Cliff tries to step in for Harper's girls weekend after Tulip cancels on her.
| 8 | 8 | "Good Deed$" | Phill Lewis | Vincent Brown | February 20, 2015 |
Richie takes over Harper's volunteer work at the local school, but his efforts to help the children lead to more harm than good.
| 9 | 9 | "$pooky $tuff" | Adam Weissman | Tim Pollock & Jeff Hodsden | February 20, 2015 |
After hearing noises in the night, Richie is convinced that his room is haunted and gets Darcy and Murray to stay with him. Harper attempts to re-create her childhood by hiring a little girl for her college application after realizing her father never took any pictures of her childhood.
| 10 | 10 | "Fir$t Love" | Phill Lewis | Bo Belanger | February 20, 2015 |
Irona starts malfunctioning, resulting her to be taken away to be repaired and being replaced by Urona, a mini-model of Irona. Upon first sight, Urona becomes Richie's first crush.

=== Season 2 (2015) ===
| No. overall | No. in season | Title | Directed by | Written by | Original release date |
|---|---|---|---|---|---|
| 11 | 1 | "Rapper'$ Delight" | Adam Weissman | Tim Pollock & Jeff Hodsden | May 22, 2015 |
Richie tries to help Tahj with his dream of becoming a rapper despite his disapproving father. Darcy exploits Harper into doing her favours in exchange for getting her attractive tutor's phone number, but not all is as it seems.
| 12 | 2 | "Briti$h Rich" | Phill Lewis | Dave Ihlenfeld & David Wright | May 22, 2015 |
Richie meets his new neighbor from the UK, Robbie, who is just as rich but has no friends. To fit in, he quickly starts copying Richie's life, trying to replace him. Meanwhile, Harper and Tahj host a telethon to raise money for homeless turtles.
| 13 | 3 | "$uperheroe$" | Phill Lewis | Tim Pollock & Jeff Hodsden | May 22, 2015 |
After a burglary, Richie, Darcy and Murray form a superhero squad in the hopes of catching the thief. Harper tries to cure Cliff's phobia of bananas.
| 14 | 4 | "$tockholm Cowboy" | Patrick Maloney | Bo Belanger | May 22, 2015 |
Swedish House Sensation visits Richie at his mansion after his DJ career has fallen apart. Richie and friends try to find him a new job. Meanwhile, Harper gets kicked off the debate team and takes up "fantasy debate" instead with Murray's help.
| 15 | 5 | "Plu$ One" | Sean Lambert | Tim Pollock & Jeff Hodsden | May 22, 2015 |
Richie is named Man of the Year, but he is told he can only invite one guest to the award ceremony. To avoid disappointing any of Irona, Darcy, Cliff, and Murray, who all want to go, Richie tells each of them that they've been chosen and spends the night trying to keep them away from each other. While the gala takes place, Harper reluctantly accepts Tahj's help in building a social media presence to boost her Harvard application.
| 16 | 6 | "Back to the Pre$ent" | Sean Lambert | Bo Belanger | May 22, 2015 |
Richie gets a visit from his future adult self, who needs his help reconnecting with his future son. In the present, Harper realizes she made a typo on her Harvard application, and enlists Tahj's help in preventing the university from seeing the application.
| 17 | 7 | "Fun and Game$" | Sean Lambert | Tim Pollock & Jeff Hodsden | May 22, 2015 |
A game designer works on a mobile game about Richie's life that offends his friends. Meanwhile, Harper and Cliff work on a musical number for class.
| 18 | 8 | "Wa$hed Up" | Sean Lambert | Dave Ihlenfeld & David Wright | May 22, 2015 |
The media starts questioning whether Richie's energy generation idea was a one-off, and so he becomes desperate to come up with something new to maintain relevance. As he's searching for ideas, Harper forms a student advocacy group with Tulip and Darcy to pad her Harvard application.
| 19 | 9 | "Meat the Camper$" | Chuck Vinson | Jeny Quine | May 22, 2015 |
After Richie's summer camp burns down, he opts to host it at his house, but his insistence on doing everything the same way causes people to be frustrated. Harper breaks her arm and is forced to have Cliff transcribe her Harvard application for her.
| 20 | 10 | "Ladie$ Man" | Chuck Vinson | Tim Pollock & Jeff Hodsden | May 22, 2015 |
A beauty pageant comes to town and Tahj, Murray, and Richie all develop crushes on the contestants. Irona, Darcy, Tulip, and Harper fight over Harry Styles tickets.
| 21 | 11 | "Family Tie$" | Patrick Maloney | Tim Pollock & Jeff Hodsden | May 22, 2015 |
When Grandma Barb visits, Richie and Harper learn a stunning family secret. Darcy hires a personal fashion designer.
