= Lauren Taylor (actress) =

American actress and singer (born 1998)

- Born: Lauren Alexandra Taylor; June 16, 1998 (age 28); Littleton, Colorado, U.S.
- Occupations: Actress; singer
- Years active: 2012–2018

Lauren Alexandra Taylor (born June 16, 1998) is an American former actress and singer. She is best known for playing role as one of the lead characters, Shelby Marcus, on the 2015–2016 Disney Channel comedy series Best Friends Whenever. Taylor previously starred as Harper, Richie's older sister in the 2015 Netflix series Richie Rich.

== Life and career ==
Taylor was born in Littleton, Colorado and grew up in San Diego, California.

At the age of fourteen, she opened for Wilson Phillips; she has also opened for Michael Bolton, Vanessa Williams, and Debbie Gibson. She was one of the opening acts at the San Diego County Fair in Del Mar in 2015.

Taylor has two brothers who are twins. In 2016, she was living with her mother and brothers in Southern California.

== Filmography ==
Year	Title	Role	Notes
2014	Fairest of the Mall	Holly	Lead role; Disney Channel pilot
2015	Richie Rich	Harper Rich	Main role
2015–2016	Best Friends Whenever	Shelby Marcus	Co-lead role
2015	Liv and Maddie	Shelby Marcus	Episode: "Haunt-a-Rooney"
2018	Shortcomings	Lemon Lamden	Episodes: "Pilot", "Pilot Pitch Presentation"
