= Woops! =

- Genre: Post-apocalyptic sitcom
- Created by: Gary Jacobs
- Written by: Ross Abrash; Maria Brown; Bill Bryan; Richard Day; Pat Dougherty; Gary Jacobs; Harold Kimmel; Tim Maile; Mark Nutter; Douglas Tuber
- Directed by: Terry Hughes
- Starring: Evan Handler; Fred Applegate; Meagen Fay; Cleavant Derricks; Marita Geraghty; Lane Davies
- Narrated by: Evan Handler
- Composer: GNG Music
- Country of origin: United States
- Original language: English
- No. of seasons: 1
- No. of episodes: 13 (3 unaired)

Production
- Executive producers: Gary Jacobs; Tony Thomas; Paul Junger Witt
- Producers: Peter Aronson; Gil Junger
- Camera setup: Multi-camera
- Running time: 30 minutes
- Production companies: Heartfelt Productions; Witt/Thomas Productions; Touchstone Television

Original release
- Network: Fox
- Release: September 27 – December 6, 1992

Woops! is an American postapocalyptic sitcom that aired on the Fox network from September 27 to December 6, 1992. The series was created by Gary Jacobs, and produced by Witt/Thomas Productions in association with Touchstone Television.

== Synopsis ==
The series centered around the six survivors of a world nuclear holocaust. They live together in an abandoned farm house while trying to survive and re-establish civilization. Thirteen episodes were made, but only 10 were aired before Fox cancelled the series. In July 2002, TV Guide named Woops! the 42nd-worst TV show of all time, and referred to as a "post-apocalyptic Gilligan's Island".

== Characters ==
- Mark Braddock (Evan Handler), formerly a schoolteacher, is the narrator of the show by writing in his journal. The pilot episode focuses on Mark, showing him finishing his classes and making a deposit at a drive-up window at the bank when a flash of light (the nuclear attack) occurs, and everything is turned to ruins except for Mark and his automobile, which was a Volvo. (The joke being that Volvos have a reputation for being well-built, reliable, and safe cars.)
- Jack Connors (Fred Applegate), formerly a homeless man and a great practical joker, revealed he survived the nuclear war because he was sleeping under an expressway overpass, whose structure protected him. Jack considered his finding the farm advantageous, as he is no longer homeless.
- Alice McConnell (Meagen Fay) was a progressive feminist stereotype. She reveals she worked in an old bookstore that had been built in the 1960s and equipped with a fallout shelter, which was converted into the basement. She ran out of register tape and went to the basement to get a fresh roll, thus being spared when the attack occurred.
- Frederick Ross (Cleavant Derricks) was formerly a research biologist. His excellent knowledge of science is vital to the survival of the community. Although he considered it ironic that he was possibly the only Black man to have survived the nuclear war, and occasionally mused over the possible loss of a Black female companion, he genuinely enjoyed his White friends and living on the farm.
- Suzanne Skillman (Marita Geraghty), a hair salon employee, is a dumb blonde stereotype, although her hair color was clearly brunette.
- Curtis Thorpe (Lane Davies) was formerly an aggressive venture capitalist. He finds adjusting to farm life difficult, as most of the business skills he had before are not needed on the farm, although he was surprisingly athletic, having participated in track and field at Harvard.

== Episodes ==
List of Woops! episodes
No.	Title	Directed by	Written by	Original release date	Prod. code
1	"Pilot"	Terry Hughes	Gary Jacobs	September 27, 1992	001
Mark tells of how during a military parade, some kids were fooling around with their remote-control toy car, which caused a nuclear warhead to launch and all the world's powers to open fire. At that time, Mark had just gotten off work and was making a deposit at the bank when, in a flash of light, the nuclear holocaust happened. Now driving through a barren wasteland, Mark stumbles upon a fertile valley containing a farm that houses five other survivors. However, the six constantly bicker and do not get along as a community, until a gigantic, mutated spider threatens the farm. The survivors have to work as a team to be able to fend off the spider.
2	"It's a Dirty Job"	Terry Hughes	Bill Bryan	October 4, 1992	002
The survivors decide that they should reproduce to increase the population, but Mark is suffering from impotence. Mark believes his impotence may be a sign the survivors need to know each other better before they can introduce children to their community.
3	"Root of All Evil"	Terry Hughes	Mark Nutter	October 11, 1992	004
The group creates their own makeshift currency.
4	"Days of Berries and Roses"	Terry Hughes	Gary Jacobs	October 18, 1992	005
The survivors find hallucinogenic berries.
5	"The Rise and Fall of Alice McConnell"	Terry Hughes	Maria Brown	October 25, 1992	003
A crystal causes Alice's bustline to grow much larger. She seems to be enjoying her new status as the object of men's attention, as opposed to Suzanne, but Mark reminds her that by giving in to being considered a sex object, she may be ruining what she has worked for her whole life – for women to gain respect.
6	"The Election"	Terry Hughes	Gary Jacobs	November 1, 1992	008
Curtis and Mark square off in a campaign for the leader of the farm.
7	"Curtis Unglued"	Terry Hughes	Richard Day	November 8, 1992	006
Curtis becomes devastated after the loss of his necktie. When it is found again and he puts it on, he somehow believes he is in the year 1986, before the nuclear holocaust happened. Mark and Alice have to somehow restore Curtis' memory.
8	"Dumb Love"	Terry Hughes	Tim Maile & Douglas Tuber	November 15, 1992	010
The group finds out Suzanne is in love, and the men clamor amongst themselves to see who is the one for whom she has fallen. When they find out she is in love with Jack, he is glad, but she cannot stand the fact he loves to go exploring and push his shopping cart around to collect things he finds on his expeditions, when he ought to be paying attention to his girlfriend. The song "My Guy" is the theme played all throughout this episode. Meanwhile, mutated squash has grown, which comes in all colors and makes a sound akin to "mach" when squeezed.
9	"The Thanksgiving Show"	Terry Hughes	Harold Kimmel & Ross Abrash	November 22, 1992	007
After a turkey is found on the farm, it grows into a gigantic turkey after eating radioactive grain. After it abducts Alice, Jack proposes a one-man rescue of her.
10	"Say It Ain't So Santa"	Terry Hughes	Mark Nutter	December 6, 1992	012
Christmas is approaching, but it is not the same, as the nuclear holocaust has ruined much of the world's evergreen tree population. While cleaning out the chimney, the group finds Santa Claus (Stuart Pankin) has visited the group, but appears depressed. Santa later reveals to the group that he is suffering survivor's guilt, as his workshop at the North Pole had a fallout shelter, but the door slammed shut and Mrs. Claus and all the elves were unable to get inside.
11	"The Nuclear Family"	Terry Hughes	Gary Murphy & Larry Strawther	Unaired	009
The group finds a teenaged delinquent has been living near the farm, and his attitude has been only worsened by the nuclear holocaust.
12	"The Littlest Pathologist"	Terry Hughes	Harold Kimmel & Ross Abrash	Unaired	011
An electrical storm reverses Fredrick's aging process.
13	"Daydreams Come and Me Wan' Go Home"	Terry Hughes	Tim Maile & Douglas Tuber	Unaired	013
When Alice makes the group hold a party to celebrate their first six months together, they all spend it daydreaming about ways to kill her.
