= Fan 3 =

American rapper (born 1987)

fan_3
- Also known as: Allison Jayne, Fann, Fannius III
- Born: Allison Jayne Lurie; December 4, 1987 (age 38); Sherman Oaks, California, U.S.
- Genres: Hip hop, pop, alternative, indie
- Occupations: Rapper, singer, songwriter
- Instrument: Vocals
- Years active: 2000–present
- Website: thisisfann.com

Allison Jayne Lurie (born December 4, 1987) is an American rapper, singer, and songwriter, better known under the stage name Fan 3 (stylized as fan_3). She released several songs in 2004, 2005, 2009, and 2010 though she never released a full-length album.

== Career ==
=== 2000: Discovery ===
When she was 13, Lurie cut several songs at her home studio; one of them, "What They Gonna Think," was chosen to be included on the Lizzie McGuire soundtrack. She was subsequently signed to Geffen Records.

=== 2004–2005: Early career ===
==== Music ====
In 2004, Fan_3 began releasing songs. One song she recorded, "Digits", was featured on the soundtrack for Shark Tale. In December 2004, Radio Disney's "Jingle Jams" album featured a Christmas song by her, titled "I Love Christmas". She also performed on the Radio Disney Jingle Jams tour with Aaron Carter. In 2005, her single "Geek Love", was a modest success, reaching number 68 on Billboard's Hot Single Sales chart and being featured on a Radio Disney compilation. Fan_3 recorded "Boom" for the movie Confessions of a Teenage Drama Queen starring Lindsay Lohan.

==== Acting ====
Fan_3 appeared in the television series Darcy's Wild Life, playing herself in one episode. She also recorded the show's theme song. Lurie also appeared in "Rap-Off," an episode Romeo!, as herself.

==== Shelved album ====
Plans were made for Fan_3 to release an album, tentatively titled "Let Me Clear My Throat", on March 19, 2005. A sampler of the album was released in late 2004, but the full-length album was never released, as she was dropped from her label prior to its release.

=== 2008–present: Shut Up Stella and new solo music ===
In 2008, Lurie formed Shut Up Stella, a pop/rock group, with Jessie Malakouti (AKA Eden XO) and Kristen Wagner. She left the group after they were dropped by their record label. In 2008 she contributed vocals on "Don't Drop a Bomb", a track off of Kay Hanley's second solo album 'Weaponize'.

Fan_3 announced in 2010 that she is working on new music. She began releasing covers and original music under her given name, Allison Jayne, through Vimeo, MySpace, and YouTube.

== Influences ==
Lurie has cited TLC, Destiny's Child, and Alanis Morissette as some of her influences. She commented in an interview with PBS Kids that she got her stage name because she likes groups with 3 people in them. Her music has drawn comparisons to Luscious Jackson, The Beastie Boys, and Fannypack.

== Personal life ==
Lurie's parents divorced when she was a child, she wrote her song "Broken Home" about the experience. She came out as bisexual in 2009, and graduated from Calabasas High School.

== Discography ==
Songs

- "What They Gonna Think"
- "Digits"
- "Boom"
- "I Love Christmas"
- "Geek Love" (#68 US Sales)
- "Hey Boy"
- "Broken Home"
- "Let Me Clear My Throat"
- "It's a Small World" (Disneymania 3)
- "Shiny Things"

Singles, EPs, etc.

- "Geek Love" CD Single
- "Let Me Clear My Throat" EP
- "Shiny Things"

Tours

- "Radio Disney Jingle Jams Tour" (with Aaron Carter (headliner for the tour), MANNIE B, Sarah LeMaire, Drew Reinartz, Lauryn Story-Witt, Andrew Stern, Alan Shaw, Mariah McBride, and Nikki Frishber)
