= Kiff VandenHeuvel =

American actor

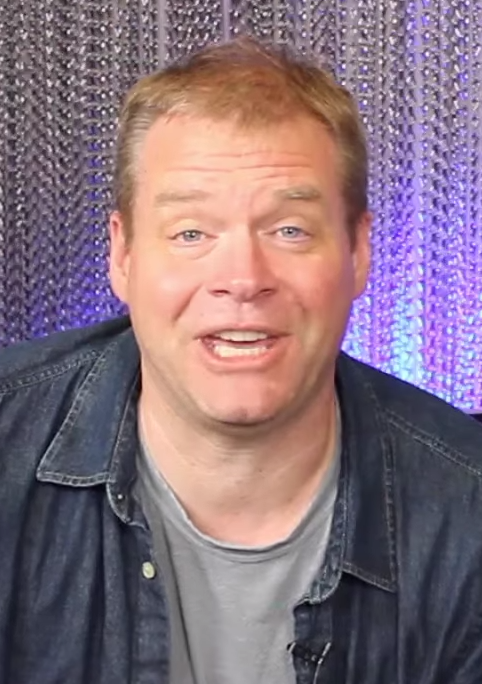
- VandenHeuvel in 2020
- Born: Christopher Jon VandenHeuvel; Grand Rapids, Michigan, U.S.
- Education: Calvin College
- Occupations: Actor; teacher; director; podcast host
- Years active: 1998–present
- Television: Richie Rich, Parks and Recreation, Family Guy, Fameless
- Spouse: Cheri Lynne VandenHeuvel
- Website: http://kiffvh.com

Kiff VandenHeuvel (born Christopher Jon VandenHeuvel) is an American actor, director and teacher of both improvisational comedy and voiceover.

He is the host of the voiceover podcast, All Over Voiceover with Kiff VH. His film credits include Batman v Superman: Dawn of Justice, Nightcrawler, La La Land, and Behind the Candelabra as Wayne (the half-brother of Liberace (Michael Douglas)). He is best known for his work as Zachary Hale Comstock in BioShock Infinite, Skavak in Star Wars: The Old Republic, Walter in Telltale's The Walking Dead, and as Cliff Rich on the Netflix series Richie Rich.

== Early life ==
Kiff was born in Grand Rapids, Michigan, the oldest of five sons. His youngest brother, Andrew Vanden Heuvel, discovered an asteroid in 2003. His grandfather, Ralph Heynen, was a pastor at Pine Rest, an institution in Cutlerville, Michigan. He had a radio broadcast where he would record his sermons in his study and they would be sent to radio stations across the country. Whenever VandenHeuvel's family would visit his grandparents, he made a beeline to his grandfather's study and played with the recording equipment. This is where he credits the beginning of his VO career, playing with his grandpa's recording rig.

VandenHeuvel attended and graduated from Calvin College, in Grand Rapids, with a degree in Communications Arts and Sciences.

== Theatre ==
VandenHeuvel is an alumnus of The Second City Detroit and The Second City Cleveland mainstage casts and has been working with The Second City comedy theatre since 1998.

VandenHeuvel has appeared in a world premiere in Adam Rapp's urban drama Gompers as the not-so-bright but big hearted doorman/lookout Shoe, which premiered at City Theatre Company in Pittsburgh, Pennsylvania.

== Career ==
In 2025, VandenHeuvel voiced Odysseus in the second episode of the miniseries Eyes of Wakanda.

== Filmography ==
=== Film ===
Year	Title	Role	Notes	Ref.
2000	Timequest	Pilot		
2003	An Ordinary Killer	Plant Manager		
2013	Star Trek Into Darkness	Additional Voices		
2013	Behind the Candelabra	Wayne		
2014	Nightcrawler	Editor		
2015	Danny Collins	Marty		
2016	Batman v Superman: Dawn of Justice	Officer Mazzuccheli		
2016	La La Land	New Coffee Shop Manager		
2021	The Little Things	Tow Truck Driver		
2022	Belle	Kei's father	Voice; English dub	
2024	My Oni Girl	Mikio Yatsuse	Voice; English dub	
2024	Mars Express	Chris Royjacker	Voice; English dub	
2025	The Rose of Versailles	Louis XV	Voice; English dub	

=== Television ===
Year	Title	Role	Notes	Ref.
2001	61*	Detroit Fan #2	TV movie	
2012	C Wright Sketch	Boyfriend	Episode: "Eau de Lucky Moments"	
2012	Incredible Crew	Construction Worker	Episode: "Rodney Tape Face"	
2012–13	Guides	Garrett Monahan	7 episodes	
2013	Parks And Recreation	Dewey	2 episodes	
2015	Richie Rich	Cliff Rich	Main role; 21 episodes	
2015	The Last Ship	Granderson's Guard	2 episodes	
2015	Jimmy Kimmel Live!	Kiff O'Shannon	Episode: "Kerry Washington/Dave Salmoni/Ne-Yo"	
2015–16	Fameless	Kiff	11 episodes	
2016	Disappeared	Narrator	10 episodes	
2016	Henry Danger	Burples the Clown	Episode: "A Finata Full of Death Bugs"	
2016	You're The Worst	Heathstead	Episode: "A Rapidly Mutating Virus"	
2016	The Thundermans	Falconman	Episode: "The Thundermans: Banished!"	
2016–18	This Is Us	Dave Malone	3 episodes	
2017	Documentary Now!	Father of Hot Daughter	Episode: "Globesmen"	
2017	Family Guy	Woody	Voice; episode: "The Finer Strings"	
2017	Star Wars Forces of Destiny	Older Han Solo	Voice; episode: "Tracker Trouble"	
2018	NCIS	Metro P.D. Sergeant Peter Todd	Episode: "Date with Destiny"	
2018	I'm Dying Up Here	Craig	Episode: "Plus One"	
2018	The Tom and Jerry Show	Ambrose, Mezmo	Voice; 2 episodes	
2018	The Rookie	Kurt Rubenovic	Episode: "Crash Course "	
2018	Black-ish	Officer Mike	Episode "Don't You Be My Neighbor"	
2018	Baskets	Scott the Golfer	Episode: "Moving On"	
2018–19	Solved	Gary, Hubbard	2 episodes	
2020	The Blacklist	CSI Agent	Episode "Rassvet"	
2020	Mom	Zeke	Episode: "Astronauts and Fat Trimmings"	
2021	The Mosquito Coast	Officer McMury	Episode: "Light Out"	
2021	The L Word: Generation Q	Warner	Episode: "Luck Be a Lady."	
2021–23	The Croods: Family Tree	Grug Crood	Voice; main role	
2021, 2024	What If...?	Obadiah Stane	Voice; 2 episodes	
2021	Gen:Lock	Marc Holcroft	Voice; 5 episodes	
2021	NCIS: Los Angeles	Carl	Episode: "Sundown"	
2022	Thermae Romae Novae	Cassius	English dub; episode: "All Baths Lead to Rome"	
2022	Bosch: Legacy	Jeremy Graff	Episode: "Pumped"	
2022	Dahmer - Monster: The Jeffrey Dahmer Story	Frank Currier	Episode: "God of Forgiveness, God of Vengeance"	
2022–23	Young Rock	Pat Patterson	Recurring role (14 episodes)	
2023	Pluto	Alexander	English dub; episode: "Episode 1.8"	
2024	Chicago Med	Floyd Bevans	Episode: "These Are Not the Droids You Are Looking For"	
2025	Eyes of Wakanda	Nicos / Odysseus	Voice; episode: "Legends and Lies"	
2026	Cow Squad	Gord	Episode: "Birds of a Feather"	

=== Video games ===
Year	Title	Role
2005	Midnight Club 3: DUB Edition	Vince
2008	Sacred 2: Fallen Angel	Additional Voices
2011	Star Wars: The Old Republic	Skavak, Axis, Jordel Tlan, Oren Ward, Slave Leader, Tre Nareves
2013	Aliens: Colonial Marines	Dr. Norman Bick
2013	BioShock: Infinite	Zachary Hale Comstock
2013	Disney Infinity	Incredibles Newscaster
2013	The Walking Dead: Season Two	Walter
2014	The Evil Within	Oscar Connelly, Police Officer B, Villager C
2014	World of Warcraft: Warlords of Draenor	Additional Voices
2015	StarCraft II: Legacy of the Void	Additional Voices
2016	World of Warcraft: Legion	Additional Voices
2016	Fallout 4: Nuka-World	Grandchester Mystery Mansion System
2016	StarCraft II: Nova Covert Ops	Additional Voices
2016	Dishonored 2	Male Guard Elite
2016	Batman: The Telltale Series	Victor Zsasz, Enforcer #3, COA #1
2017	Horizon Zero Dawn	Additional Voices
2018	Spider-Man	Additional Voices
2020	XCOM: Chimera Squad	Floyd Tesseract, Additional Voices
2020	Mafia: Definitive Edition	Additional Voices
2020	Star Wars: Squadrons	Pilot
2020	Spider-Man: Miles Morales	Roxxon Security, Additional Voices
2022	Saints Row	The Dust King, Character Voices
2023	Diablo IV	Additional Voices
2023	Starfield	Claudio Amsterdam
2023	Spider-Man 2	Additional Voices
