= Kevin Symons =

American actor (born c. 1970)

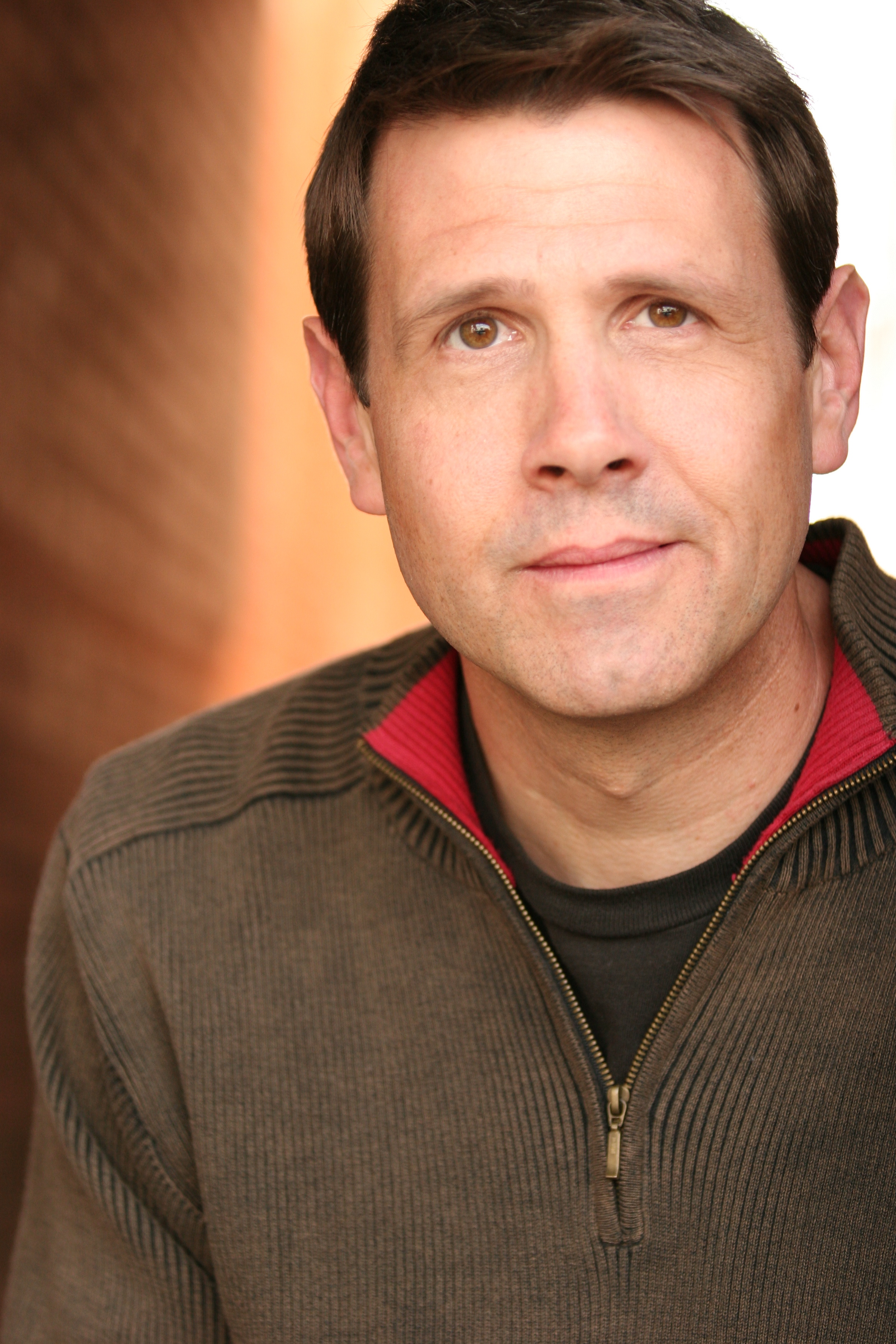
- Symons in 2009
- Born: c. 1970 (age 55–56); Highland Park, Illinois, U.S.
- Occupation: Actor
- Years active: 1991–present

Kevin Symons (born c. 1970) is an American actor.

== Biography ==
Symons is best known for role as Dr. Kevin Adams in the television series Darcy's Wild Life, as well as Councilman Bill Dexhart in the television comedy Parks and Recreation. His other television credits include Joan of Arcadia, iCarly, Medium, Models, Inc., Sabrina, the Teenage Witch, Veronica Mars, The West Wing, the Teen Wolf series, and as recurring roles in the soap operas, Passions, The Bold and the Beautiful, and ABC Network's Desperate Housewives and on Disney Channel Original Series Best Friends Whenever.

== Filmography ==
- Darcy's Wild Life
- Joan of Arcadia
- iCarly
- Medium
- Models Inc.
- Sabrina, the Teenage Witch
- My Name Is Earl
- Veronica Mars
- The West Wing
- Teen Wolf
- Parks and Recreation
- Passions
- The Bold and the Beautiful
- Desperate Housewives
- Best Friends Whenever
- Henry Danger
- This is Us
