= Elizabeth Wong (playwright) =

- Occupation: Playwright
- Website: elizabethwong.net

Elizabeth Wong is a contemporary American playwright, television writer, librettist, theatrical director, college professor, social essayist, and a writer of plays for young audiences. Her critically acclaimed plays include China Doll (An Imagined Life of an American Actress) is a fictional tale of the actress, Anna May Wong; and Letters to A Student Revolutionary, a story of two friends during the Tiananmen Square protests of 1989. Wong has written for television on All American Girl, starring Margaret Cho. She is a visiting lecturer at the College of Creative Studies, University of California, Santa Barbara, where her papers are archived, an adjunct professor at the University of Southern California, USC School of Theater, and an associate professor at Boston Conservatory at Berklee. She holds a Master of Fine Arts degree from New York University Tisch School of the Arts, Dramatic Writing Program (1991) and a Bachelor of Arts degree in English and Broadcast Journalism from the University of Southern California (1980). She studied playwriting with Tina Howe, Maria Irene Fornes and Mac Wellman.

== Selected plays ==
- Letters to a Student Revolutionary (Pan Asian Repertory Theatre, 1991), (New York Times Review 5/16/1991)
- Kimchee & Chitlins (West Coast Ensemble, 1994), (Los Angeles Times feature article 5/26/1992
- China Doll (Northwest Asian American Theatre, 1996)
- Let the Big Dog Eat (short play) (Humana Festival, Actors Theater of Louisville, 1998)
- Amazing Adventures of the Marvelous Monkey King (children's play) (Denver Center for the Performing Arts, 1991)
- Prometheus (children's play) (Denver Center Theater for the Performing Arts, 1999)
- The Happy Prince (children's play)
- Boid & Oskar (children's play) (Cincinnati Playhouse in the Park)
- Aftermath of a Chinese Banquet
- Bill of (W)Rights (Minneapolis' Mixed Blood Theater, 2004)
- Alice Downsized
- Dating & Mating in Modern Times (Theatre Emory, 2003)
- The Concubine Spy
- Badass of the RIP Eternal (short play) (Actors Theatre of Louisville, Humana Festival, part of "Heaven and Hell on Earth: A Divine Comedy," 2002)
- Bu and Bun
- Inside the Red Envelope
- Quickdraw Grandma (2004)
- Punk Girls
- Reveries of an Amorous Woman
- Love Life of a Chinese Eunuch (2004)
- Ibong Adarna: Fabulous Filipino Folktale (children's play) (Mu Performing Arts, 2006)
- Finding Your Inner Zulu (short play) (Silk Road Theatre Project, part of "The DNA Trail," 2010),
- The Magical Bird: A Fabulous Filipino Folktail (musical), (Honolulu Theatre for Youth, 2007); Honolulu Star-News Bulletin review 4/27/07
- The Happy Prince (musical/opera), based on her adaptation (children's play) (From Page-to-Stage/Prelude New Play Festival, Kennedy Center for the Performing Arts, 2003)

== Selected awards ==
- Tanne Foundation Award (2007) for artistic achievement
- Board of Supervisors, County of Los Angeles, Letter of Commendation (2009) for human rights advocacy
- Outstanding Playwright Award (2009), Asian Pacific American Friends of Theatre
- The Mark David Cohen National Playwriting Award (2001), Kennedy Center for the Performing Arts
- Lazarus New Play Prize for Young Audiences (1999)
- Jane Chambers Playwriting Award (1998), Kennedy Center's American College Theatre Festival and Association for Theatre in Higher Education
