= Douglas Tuber and Tim Maile =

American television producers and writers

Douglas Tuber and Tim Maile are an American television writing and producing duo. Their credits include Herman's Head, All American Girl, Smart Guy, Jessie, Salute Your Shorts and Lizzie McGuire, as well as creating Phil of the Future and Darcy's Wild Life.

== Credits ==
- Spidey and His Amazing Friends (writers, 1 episode, 2024)
- Mira, Royal Detective (writers, 12 episodes, 2020–2022)
- Littlest Pet Shop: A World of Our Own (producers, story editors, writers, 10 episodes, 2018)
- Sonic Boom (writers, 1 episode, 2015)
- Jessie (consulting producers, writers, 2011–2012)
- Famous 5: On the Case (writers, creative producers, 28 episodes, 2008)
- Darcy's Wild Life (creators, writers, executive producers, 2004-2006)
- Phil of the Future (creators, writers, executive producers, 14 episodes, 2004–2006)
- Lizzie McGuire (writers, executive producers, consulting producers, 37 episodes, 2001–2004)
- Family Affair (executive producers, 2002)
- Smart Guy (writers, 6 episodes, 1997–1999)
- Life's Work (writers, producers, 1996–1997)
- All American Girl (writers, producers, 16 episodes, 1994–1995)
- Herman's Head (writers, 1993–1994)
- Woops! (writers, 1 episode, 1992)
- Salute Your Shorts (writers, 9 episodes, 1991–1992)
