= Famous 5: On the Case =

2008 animated television series

- The characters, from top left: Jyothi, Max, Allie, Dylan, and Timmy the dog
- Based on: The Famous Five by Enid Blyton
- Written by: Tim Maile; Douglas Tuber
- Directed by: Thierry Sapyn; Pascal Pinon
- Voices of: Sauvane Delanoë; Alexandra Pic; Alexandre Nguyen; Hervé Grull; Laurence Dourlens; Barbara Beretta
- Theme music composer: Keith Cox; Barnaby Legg; Martin Wright
- Composers: Fabrice Aboulker; Pascal Stive
- Countries of origin: United Kingdom; France
- Original language: French
- No. of series: 1
- No. of episodes: 26

Production
- Executive producers: Vincent Chalvon-Demersay; Teresa Reed
- Producers: David Michel; Laura Clunie
- Running time: 22 minutes
- Production companies: Marathon Media Group; Chorion

Original release
- Network: Disney Channel (United Kingdom); France 3 (France)
- Release: 5 April – 27 September 2008

Famous 5: On the Case (French: Le Club des cinq : Nouvelles Enquêtes) is an animated television series loosely based on the Famous Five series of novels by Enid Blyton. The series is a British-French co-production between Chorion Rights Limited, Marathon Media and France 3, in association with Disney Channel and Super RTL. The series was developed for television by Douglas Tuber and Tim Maile, the writers of the former Disney Channel series Lizzie McGuire.

== Plot ==
The central characters, children of the original Famous Five, embark on a new series of adventures. During these adventures the new Famous Five are able to make use of newer technology such as laptop computers and mobile phones which had never been invented in their parents' day.

== Characters ==
- Jo Misra (Voiced by Sauvane Delanoë in the French version and Ciara Janson in the English version) - The 12-year-old daughter of George Kirrin, and like her mother before her is a tomboy and prefers to shorten her name to a more masculine form. She is of Anglo-Indian heritage; her father is a man named Ravi whom George met in the Himalayas. Her name is short for Jyothi, a Hindi word meaning light.
- Max Kirrin (Voiced by Hervé Grull in the French version and Jon Lee in the English version) - The 13-year-old son of Julian Kirrin. He is an adrenaline junkie who enjoys sports such as mountain biking and skateboarding.
- Allie Campbell (Voiced by Alexandra Pic in the French version and Kelly Metzger in the English version) - The 12-year-old daughter of Anne Kirrin, who moved to California after university and is now a successful art dealer. Allie, who was born in California before moving to Falcongate, is a happy shopaholic and uses her cellphone to stay in contact with America.
- Dylan Kirrin (Voiced by Alexandre Nguyen in the French version and Lizzie Waterworth in the English version) - Son of Dick Kirrin. He is an 11-year-old fan of gadgets and aspiring entrepreneur who likes to look for ways to make money.
- Timmy the Dog (Vocal effects by Justin Fletcher in the English version) - The Famous Five's trusty pet dog. In the French version, he is called Dagobert.
- Dane and Blaine Dunston - they are neighbours of the Famous Five, who are the same age as them, but are spoiled, pampered and arrogant due to their father's wealth. They typically have their comeuppance whenever they appear, but have been shown to team up with the five on occasion.

== Episodes ==
There are 26 episodes and each episode is 22 minutes long.

No.	Title	Written by	Original release date	Prod. code
1	"The Case of the Fudgie Fry Pirates"	Douglas Tuber and Tim Maile	5 April 2008	TBA
2	"The Case of the Plant That Could Eat Your House"	Douglas Tuber and Tim Maile	12 April 2008	TBA
3	"The Case of the Impolite Snarly Thing"	Douglas Tuber and Tim Maile	19 April 2008	TBA
4	"The Case of the Sticks and Their Tricks"	Rachelle Romberg	26 April 2008	TBA
5	"The Case of the Plot to Pull the Plug"	Douglas Tuber and Tim Maile	3 May 2008	TBA
6	"The Case of the Thief Who Drinks From the Toilet"	Dave Polsky	10 May 2008	TBA
7	"The Case of the Hot Air BA-BOOM!"	Douglas Tuber and Tim Maile	17 May 2008	TBA
8	"The Case of the Stinky Smell"	Amy Wolfram	24 May 2008	TBA
9	"The Case of the Defective Detective"	Simon Jowett	31 May 2008	TBA
10	"The Case of Allie's Really Very Bad Singing"	Catherine Lieuwen	7 June 2008	TBA
11	"The Case of the Medieval Meathead"	Ben Townsend	14 June 2008	TBA
12	"The Case of the Messy Mucked up Masterpiece"	Brian Swenlin	21 June 2008	TBA
13	"The Case of the Guy Who Makes You Act Like A Chicken"	Sharon Schartz Rosenthal	28 June 2008	TBA
14	"The Case of the Felon with Frosty Fingers"	Charleen Easton	5 July 2008	TBA
15	"The Case of the Bogus Banknotes"	Simon Jowett	12 July 2008	TBA
16	"The Case of 8 Arms and No Fingerprints"	Dave Polsky	19 July 2008	TBA
17	"The Case of the Flowers That Make Your Body Go All Wobbly"	Rich Rinaldi and Dan Fybel	26 July 2008	TBA
18	"The Case of the Guy Who Looks Very Good for a 2000 Year Old"	Douglas Tuber and Tim Maile	2 August 2008	TBA
19	"The Case of the Gobbling Goop"	Richard P. Halke and Steve Luchsinger	9 August 2008	TBA
20	"The Case of the Surfer Dude Who is Truly Rude"	Douglas Tuber and Tim Maile	16 August 2008	TBA
21	"The Case of the Cactus, The Coot and The Cowboy Boot"	Douglas Tuber and Tim Maile	23 August 2008	TBA
22	"The Case of the Seal Who Gets All Up in Your Face"	Douglas Tuber and Tim Maile	30 August 2008	TBA
23	"The Case of the Snow, The Glow and The OH-NO!"	Douglas Tuber and Tim Maile	6 September 2008	TBA
24	"The Case of the Fish That Flew The Coop"	Douglas Tuber and Tim Maile	13 September 2008	TBA
25	"The Case of the Smashed and Tangled Museum"	Douglas Tuber and Tim Maile	20 September 2008	TBA
26	"The Case of the Golden Medal and the Horse of Steel"	Douglas Tuber and Tim Maile	27 September 2008	TBA

== Merchandise ==
Along with the series, Hodder Books has produced a "flipper" novel of some of the 26 episodes. Each book contains two of the stories and are available in UK bookstores. No other merchandise was ever released. The books are:

1. Case Files 1 & 2: The Case of the Fudgie Fry Pirates & The Case of the Plant that Could Eat Your House
2. Case Files 3 & 4: The Case of the Impolite Snarly Thing & The Case of the Sticks and Their Tricks
3. Case Files 5 & 6: The Case of the Plot to Pull the Plug & The Case of the Thief Who Drinks from the Toilet
4. Case Files 7 & 8: The Case of the Hot-Air Ba-Boom! & The Case of the Stinky Smell
5. Case Files 9 & 10: The Case of the Defective Detective & The Case of Allie's Really Very Bad Singing
6. Case Files 11 & 12: The Case of the Medieval Meathead & The Case of the Messy Mucked Up Masterpiece
7. Case Files 13 & 14: The Case of the Guy Who Makes You Act Like A Chicken & The Case of the Felon with Frosty Fingers
8. Case Files 15 & 16: The Case of the Bogus Banknotes & The Case of Eight Arms and No Fingerprints
9. Case Files 17 & 18: The Case of the Flowers That Make Your Body All Wobbly & The Case of the Guy Who Looks Pretty Good for a 2000 Year-Old
10. Case Files 19 & 20: The Case of the Gobbling Goop & The Case of the Surfer Dude Who's Truly Rude
11. Case Files 21 & 22: The Case of the Cactus, the Coot, and the Cowboy Boot & The Case of the Seal Who Gets All Up in Your Face
12. Case Files 23 & 24: The Case of the Snow, the Glow and the Oh, No! & The Case of the Fish That Flew the Coop

== Broadcast ==
Disney Channel networks across the world (including the UK, France, Africa, Middle-East, Asian, Australian, and German networks) acquired pay-TV rights to the series. Super RTL (Germany), RTBF (Belgium), the Dutch version of Disney Channel, and LNK (Lithuania) acquired free-TV rights.

The series aired in the United States on Qubo.

== Home media ==
The series was released in France on DVD by Buena Vista Home Entertainment in August 2010 in two two-disc volumes that make up the whole series.
