= Andrew Chalmers (actor) =

Canadian former actor (born 1992)

- Born: Andrew N. Chalmers; December 21, 1992 (age 33); Toronto, Ontario, Canada
- Occupation: Actor
- Years active: 2003–2008
- Website: openindividual.com

Andrew N. Chalmers (born December 21, 1992) is a Canadian former teen actor.

Chalmers was born in Toronto, Ontario, Canada. From 2003 to 2006, he played at least 15 roles in both television and feature films. His acting progressed clearly from minor roles to playing the lead as the voice of Harry in the television series Harry and His Bucket Full of Dinosaurs. Chalmers was also in Chicks with Sticks and the television series Darcy's Wild Life, where he played Jack Adams.

== Filmography ==
=== Television ===
- Darcy's Wild Life (2004–2006) – Jack Adams
- Harry and His Bucket Full of Dinosaurs (2005) – Harry
- A Very Married Christmas (2004) – Gabe
- Mutant X (2003) – Young Jonny

=== Film ===
- Finn's Girl (2007) – Max
- Molly: An American Girl on the Home Front (2006) (TV) – Richard 'Ricky' McIntire
- Siblings (2004) – Pete
- Pigeon (2004) – Stray Kid #2
- A Home at the End of the World (2004) – Young Bobby Morrow (1967)
- Godsend (2004) – a St. Pius Student
- Chicks with Sticks (2004) – Stewart "Stewie" Taymore
- Comfort and Joy (2003) (TV) – Troy Keller and Ryan Chalmers

== Awards ==
In 2006 and 2007, Andrew and his young co-stars from Darcy's Wild Life were nominated for the Young Artist Award in the category "Best Young Ensemble Performance in a TV Series" (Comedy or Drama).
