= Gary Jacobs (writer) =

Gary Jacobs is an American television comedy writer and producer and author.

He was born in New York in 1952, grew up in Dallas, and was educated at the University of Texas at Austin, where he received his bachelor's degree in Journalism.

Immediately upon graduation, Jacobs moved to New York to pursue comedy writing. His first job was at the Children's Television Workshop, where he became co-editor (with Ron Barrett) of The Electric Company Magazine, a companion piece to the television series. A couple of years later, Jacobs landed his first television job, writing for The Dick Cavett Show.

Jacobs then moved to Los Angeles, and began accumulating credits, writing for both variety shows and situation comedies. His big break came when he was hired (with writing partner, Arnie Kogen) on the staff of Newhart.

In 1988, Jacobs executive produced a new series, Empty Nest, which became a long-running hit for NBC. It was one of the top ten highest rated shows each of the three seasons Jacobs served as Executive Producer.

After Empty Nest, Jacobs created and executive produced two series of his own. The first, Woops!, was a zany, Monty Pythonesque show about a group of survivors of a nuclear war. The second series was All-American Girl, starring Margaret Cho, the first American sitcom to feature an Asian-American family.

In 2000, Jacobs left television and moved to Austin. There, he has published a novel (Still Life with Genitals), two anthologies of short pieces (Out of My Mind: A Collection of Essays, Short Stories, and Other Silly Things and Maybe It's Just Me), and a children's book (The Curious Ant). He also earned two master's degrees, one in Education from Texas State University and the other in Creative Writing from Goddard College.

Jacobs has written humorous essays for a variety of publications, including the Los Angeles Times and the Huffington Post.

He is currently posting videos on TikTok and YouTube under the username "garyjacobs70yearsold."

Jacobs is married with two children and numerous animals.
