= Do the Math (Dove Cameron song) =

2026 single by Dove Cameron

Single by Dove Cameron

from the album Final Girl
- Released: October 23, 2026
- Recorded: 2021
- Genre: Alternative pop
- Length: 3:06
- Label: Disruptor; Columbia
- Songwriters: Dove Cameron; Mark Schick; Evan Blair; Tyler Spry; Madi Yanofsky
- Producers: Mark Schick; Tyler Spry

Dove Cameron singles chronology
"When in Rome" (2026)	"Do the Math" (2026)

Music video
- "Do the Math" on YouTube

"Do the Math" (stylized in all lowercase) is a song recorded by American singer and songwriter Dove Cameron. It was released by Disruptor and Columbia Records on September 9, 2026, as the second single from Cameron's debut studio album, Final Girl (2026). An alternative pop song, Cameron co-wrote "Do the Math" with Evan Blair, Mark Schick, Tyler Spry and Madi Yanofsky, while Schick and Spry handled the production.

"Do the Math" sonically and lyrically departed from its predecessor, "When in Rome", which was released a month prior as the lead single from Final Girl. Using mathematical language and metaphors, it sees Cameron call out a former partner for being the "common denominator" in his relationships, since everybody experiences the same problems with him. The production and Cameron's vocals were praised by critics, as well as the relatability of the lyrical content.

== Background and release ==
"Do the Math" was initially recorded in 2021, with the original version of the track completed on December 22, 2021. She later released the extended play (EP) Alchemical: Volume 1 (2023), which did not include the track. After she scrapped plans for a second volume, she completed work an interation of her upcoming debut studio album in June 2024, days before leaving for Montreal to film for the American television series 56 Days (2026). The album was expected to be released in late 2025, with Cameron releasing various singles: "Too Much", "French Girls", "Romeo", "Whatever You Like" and "Hello My Old Lover".

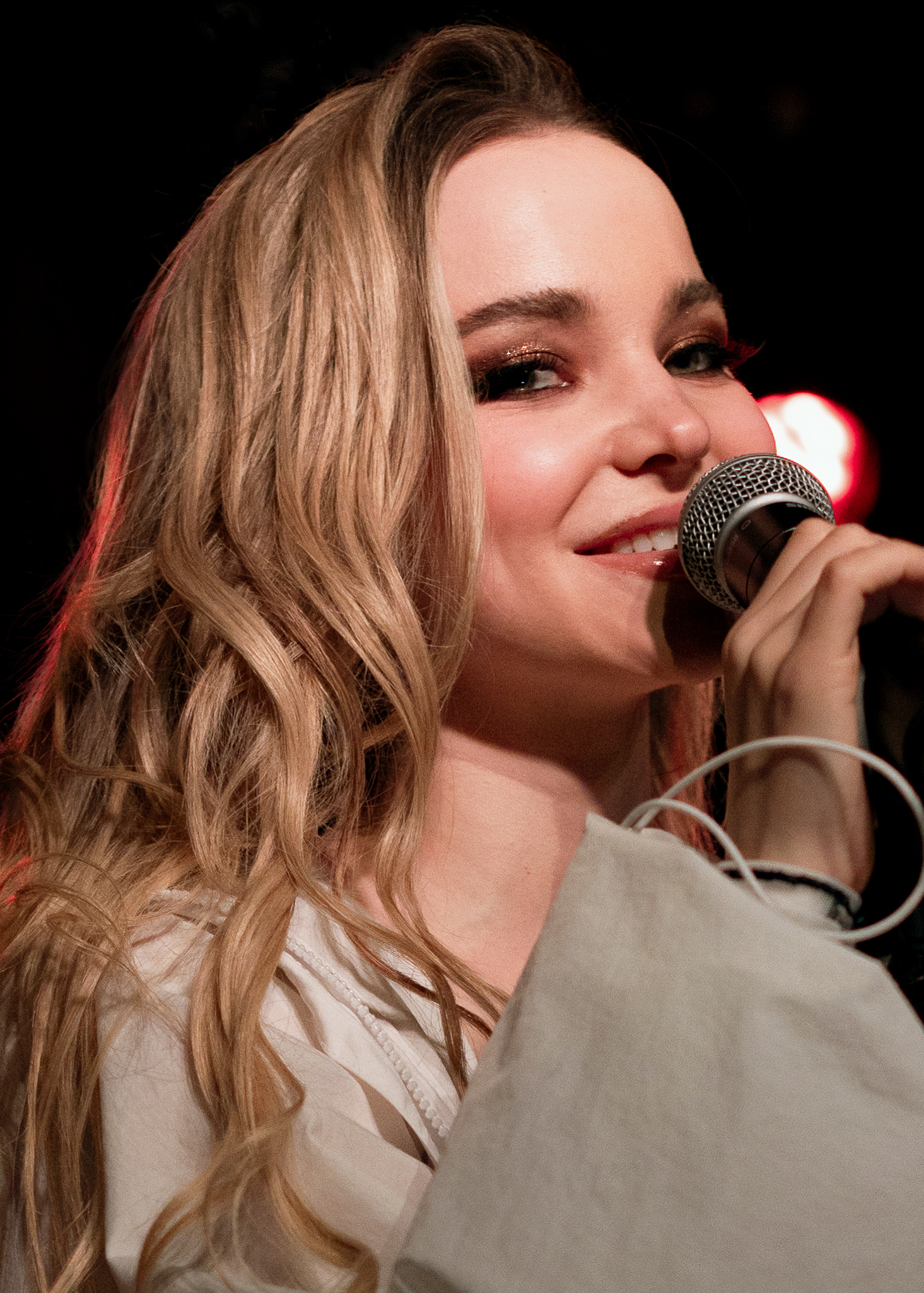
"Do the Math" was initially recorded in 2021.

In 2026, during a press tour for 56 Days, Cameron revealed that Columbia Records had blocked the release of her debut album on numerous occasions and that she had submitted various versions of a debut album since signing with them in 2018. After eight years and "begging openly, being like, what the hell? Where's the album?" with Columbia, she confirmed that they had greenlit for her to release it in 2026. Following ten months of musical inactivity, she released "When in Rome" on September 9, 2026, as the lead single. She announced a month later that "Do the Math" had been unearthed from her old, unreleased songs, and that it would be released as the second single from the album. She concurrently announced the title of the album as Final Girl (2026). Days prior to the release of "Do the Math", Cameron's social media accounts shared mathematical puzzles that fans worked through to reveal the release date: October 23, 2026. Three days later, an accompanying music video was released.

== Composition and lyrics ==
Described as an alternative pop song, Cameron co-wrote "Do the Math" with Evan Blair, Mark Schick, Tyler Spry and Madi Yanofsky, while Schick and Spry handled the production. "Do the Math" differs sonically and lyrically from its predecessor, "When in Rome". While the latter was described as a "cozy love song", "Do the Math", instead sees Cameron speak negatively of an ex-partner. It was likened to Cameron's previous singles "Too Much" and "Lethal Woman". It begins with gentle piano keys before introducing heavier instrumentation, which was described as a "rock-like flavor". The lyrical content of "Do the Math" sees Cameron call out a former romantic partner for blaming his exes for his own issues. Describing him as the "common denominator"; it uses various other mathematical language and metaphors to make its central point: that if his exes repeatedly experience the same problems, he should consider his role in his relationships.

== Critical reception ==
Nnesoma Okechukwu, writing for Euphoria, found the juxtaposition of releasing "Do the Math" after "When in Rome" interesting and guessed that Cameron intended for listeners to be introduced to various themes prior to the release of Final Girl. She enjoyed the production of the song the most, writing that it complimented Cameron's vocals well. Emma Platt, writing for RGM, awarded the song 4.5 out of a possible 5 stars. She found it satisfying to hear Cameron call out the former partner, since she felt everybody could relate to the meaning of the song. She also noted her excitement for the rest of Final Girl following the song.

== Credits and personnel ==
Credits adapted from Spotify.

- Dove Cameron – vocals, songwriting
- Mark Schick – songwriting, production, recording engineer, backing vocals, bass, guitar, keyboard, piano, programming
- Evan Blair – songwriting, vocal production, backing vocals
- Tyler Spry – songwriting, backing vocals, bass, guitar, keyboard, programming
- Madi Yanofsky – songwriting
- Ben Barter – drums
- Nathan Phillips – mixing engineer
- Nathan Dantzler – mastering engineer
- Harrison Tate – assistant mastering engineer

== Release history ==
Region	Date	Format	Label	Ref.
Various	October 23, 2026	Digital download; streaming	Disruptor; Columbia	
