= List of awards and nominations received by Dove Cameron =

Dove Cameron awards and nominations
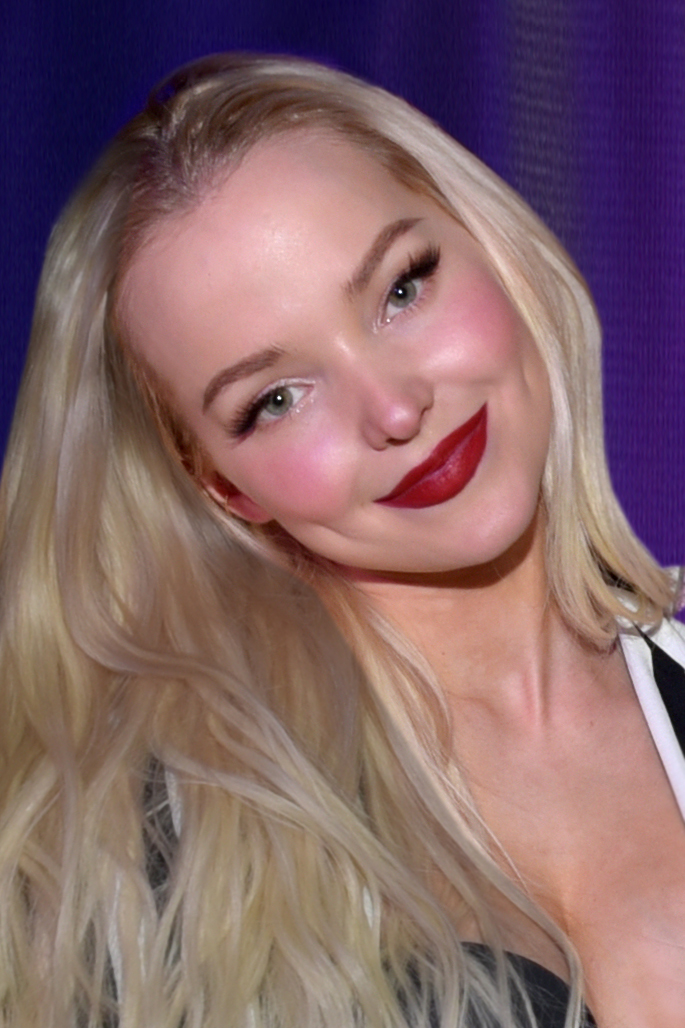
- Cameron in 2019
Awards and nominations
Award	Wins	Nominations
American Music Awards	1	1
Daytime Emmy Awards	1	1
GLAAD Media Awards	1	1
MTV Video Music Awards	2	2

Totals (Note: Certain award groups do not simply award one winner. They acknowledge several different recipients, have runners-up, and have third place. Since this is a specific recognition and is different from losing an award, runner-up mentions are considered wins in this award tally. For simplification and to avoid errors, each award in this list has been presumed to have had a prior nomination.)
- Wins: 8
- Nominations: 18

American singer and actress Dove Cameron has received many accolades and nominations throughout her career. She rose to prominence for her dual role of the eponymous characters on the Disney Channel television series Liv and Maddie (2013-2017), earning her Daytime Emmy Award for Outstanding Performer in Children's Programming, as well as nominations for three Teen Choice Awards, and two Kids' Choice Awards—ultimately won the Kids' Choice Award for Favorite Movie Actress for her performance in Descendants 3 (2019).

Cameron's breakthrough as a music artist came in 2022, after the release of her single "Boyfriend", which became a successful hit reaching the top-twenty on both Billboard Global 200 and the US Billboard Hot 100, and garnered her an American Music Award for New Artist of the Year, a MTV Video Music Award for Best New Artist and a GLAAD Media Award for Outstanding Breakthrough Music Artist, as well as New Artist of the Year nominations from the iHeartRadio Music, MTV Europe Music and People Choice award ceremonies. Her single "Breakfast" won the MTV Video Music Award for Video for Good.

== Awards and nominations ==
Name of the award ceremony, year presented, recipient of the award, category and result
Award	Year (Note: Indicates the year of ceremony. Each year is linked to the article about the awards held that year, wherever possible.)	Recipient(s)	Category	Result	Ref.
American Music Awards	2022	Herself	New Artist of the Year	Won	
BMI Pop Awards	2023	"Boyfriend"	Most Performed Songs of the Year	Honored	
Daytime Emmy Awards	2018	Liv and Maddie	Outstanding Performer in a Children's, Preschool Children's or Educational and Informational Program	Won	
GLAAD Media Awards	2023	Herself	Outstanding Breakthrough Music Artist	Won	
iHeartRadio Music Awards	2023	Herself	Best New Pop Artist	Nominated	
MTV Europe Music Awards	2022	Herself	Best New	Nominated	
MTV Movie & TV Awards	2017	"You Can't Stop the Beat" (Note: Shared with the cast of Hairspray Live!)	Best Musical Moment	Nominated	
MTV Video Music Awards	2022	Herself	Best New Artist	Won	
MTV Video Music Awards	2023	"Breakfast"	Video for Good	Won	
Nickelodeon Kids' Choice Awards	2016	Liv and Maddie	Favorite Female TV Star – Kids' Show	Nominated	
Nickelodeon Kids' Choice Awards	2017	Liv and Maddie	Favorite Female TV Star	Nominated	
Nickelodeon Kids' Choice Awards	2020	Descendants 3	Favorite Movie Actress	Won	
Nickelodeon Kids' Choice Awards	2023	Herself	Favorite Breakout Artist	Won	
People Choice Awards	2022	Herself	The New Artist of 2022	Nominated	
Queerties	2023	"Boyfriend"	Queer Anthem	Nominated	
Teen Choice Awards	2014	Liv and Maddie	Choice TV: Female Breakout Star	Nominated	
Teen Choice Awards	2015	Liv and Maddie	Choice TV Actress: Comedy	Nominated	
Teen Choice Awards	2016	Liv and Maddie	Choice TV Actress: Comedy	Nominated	
