= When in Rome (song) =

2026 single by Dove Cameron

Single by Dove Cameron

from the album Final Girl
- Released: September 9, 2026
- Length: 3:04
- Label: Disruptor; Columbia
- Songwriters: Dove Cameron; CJ Baran; Mark Schick; Ilsey Juber; Madison Love
- Producers: CJ Baran; Mark Schick; Ilsey Juber

Dove Cameron singles chronology
"Hello My Old Lover" (2025)	"When in Rome" (2026)	"Do the Math" (2026)

Music video
- "When in Rome" on YouTube

"When in Rome" (stylized in all lowercase) is a song recorded by American singer and songwriter Dove Cameron. It was released by Disruptor and Columbia Records on September 9, 2026, as the lead single from Cameron's debut studio album, Final Girl (2026). She co-wrote the song alongside CJ Baran, Mark Schick, Ilsey Juber and Madison Love; Baran and Schick handled the production of the track. A music video filmed on the streets of Capena, directed by Hannah De Vries, was released alongside the song.

Released after a period of musical inactivity, the song was released ten months after previous single "Hello My Old Lover". The lyrical content of the song dissects the feeling of love Cameron feels whilst in the city of Rome and follows her engagement to Italian singer Damiano David. Critics praised "When in Rome", complimenting its production and Cameron's vocals, as well as Billboard readers voting it as their favorite new song of the week.

== Background and release ==
Cameron initially completed work on her upcoming debut album in June 2024, days before leaving for Montreal to film for the American television series 56 Days (2026). The album was expected to be released in late 2025, with Cameron having stated to Nylon that once October begins, "you're f*cked! It's Christmas music. There's no chance of anyone listening to your sh*t!" In 2025, Cameron released various singles: "Too Much", "French Girls", "Romeo", "Whatever You Like" and "Hello My Old Lover".

In 2026, during a press tour for 56 Days, Cameron revealed that Columbia Records had blocked the release of her debut album on numerous occasions and that she had submitted various iterations of a debut album since signing with them in 2018. It was also confirmed that she had recorded more music for the album. After eight years and "begging openly, being like, what the hell? Where's the album?" with Columbia, she confirmed that they had greenlit for her to release it in 2026. Following ten months of musical inactivity, she released "When in Rome" on September 9, 2026, as the lead single from the album. It was serviced to radios on September 18.

== Composition and lyrics ==
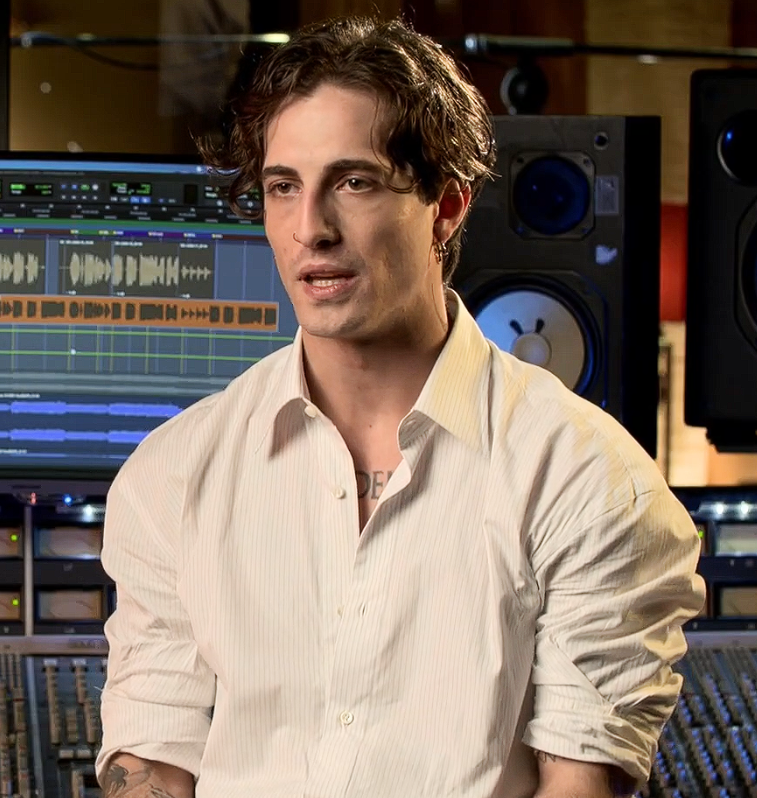
"When in Rome" follows Cameron's engagement to Italian singer Damiano David.

Described by Euphoria as a track with a "lightly flavored production style", it was compared to earlier single "Whatever You Like". Cameron co-wrote the song alongside CJ Baran, Mark Schick, Ilsey Juber and Madison Love; Baran and Schick handled the production of the track. The lyrical content dissects the feeling of love Cameron feels when in the Italian city of Rome. The chorus sees her flip the saying "when in Rome, do as the Romans do" to instead give the city a romantic edge. The song follows Cameron's engagement to Italian singer Damiano David. The two later got married on September 24, 2026 in Montalcino, Italy at the Palazzo dei Priori.

== Music video ==
An accompanying music video for "When in Rome" was released on the day of its release, directed by Hannah De Vries. It was filmed on the streets of Capena, a town in Rome. The scenes showcase various couples in love in the city, whilst Cameron admires and cheers them on. The ending of the music video sees the sunny skies change to dark and thundery, with lightning that spells out "Final Girl", teasing the title of her then-upcoming album.

== Critical reception ==
BroadwayWorld praised Cameron for taking listeners into a "surrealist, cinematic, dream-like reality" with the song and enjoyed her vocals and the song's production. Euphoria also complimented the production of the song, appreciating that it allowed for listeners to be able to visualize a story whilst listening. They enjoyed the trumpet that leads into the bridge, as well as praising Cameron's vocals. The song also topped Billboard's weekly poll for the new song that readers enjoyed most that week, with 71% of the vote.

== Credits and personnel ==
Credits adapted from Spotify.

- Dove Cameron – vocals, songwriting
- CJ Baran – songwriting, production, recording engineer, bass, programming
- Mark Schick – songwriting, production, recording engineer, guitar, programming
- Ilsey Juber – songwriting, production
- Madison Love – songwriting
- Mitch McCarthy – mixing engineer
- Nathan Dantzler – mastering engineer
- Harrison Tate – assistant mastering engineer

== Charts ==
=== Weekly charts ===
Weekly chart performance
Chart (2026)	Peak position
Lithuania Airplay (TopHit)	44

=== Monthly charts ===
Monthly chart performance
Chart (2026)	Peak position
Lithuania Airplay (TopHit)	66

== Release history ==
Region	Date	Format	Label	Ref.
Various	September 9, 2026	Digital download; streaming	Disruptor; Columbia	
