= 9 Months & 50 Hours =

Mixtape by Fred Again and Latin Mafia
- Released: 31 July 2026
- Recorded: c. 2025; 28–30 July 2026
- Studios: Lago Algo, Bosque de Chapultepec, Mexico City
- Length: 46:50
- Languages: Spanish; English
- Labels: Atlantic; Rimas
- Producers: Fred Again; Latin Mafia; Boo; Darcy Lewis; Jon Hopkins; Kieran Hebden; Purc; Tobias Wincorn

Fred Again chronology
| USB002 (2026) | 9 Months & 50 Hours (2026) |

Latin Mafia chronology
| Todos los días todo el día (2024) | 9 Months & 50 Hours (2026) |

9 Months & 50 Hours is a collaborative mixtape by British record producer Fred Again and Mexican indie band Latin Mafia. It was released on 31 July 2026 via Atlantic Records and Rimas Entertainment. Recorded over a two-day span in Mexico City, it features collaborations with Bby, IVOxygen, Rue de la Fortuna, KatzPascale, Jon Hopkins, Lil Yachty, and Mabe Fratti. Both artists handled production, alongside Darcy Lewis, Kieran Hebden, Purc, Tobias Wincorn, and Fred's younger brother Benjy Gibson, also known as Boo. It follows Fred's album Ten Days and Latin Mafia's album Todos los días todo el día (2024).

== Background ==
The news of a collaboration between Fred Again and Latin Mafia was first announced with the release of a short film on 26 July 2026 titled Under the Fabric, which was shot in one take on 11 December 2025 before Fred's show in Mexico City for his USB002 tour. It consisted of a single live session featuring "work-in-progress songs", leading fans to predict more upcoming music from the artists would be coming soon. A day after the film's release, Fred would officially announce that the mixtape would be entirely created on a continuous livestream, starting from July 28 until the project was fully finished and released. The livestream was hosted on YouTube and lasted for two days, with the project being completed on 30 July. Both artists would also hold a surprise concert at the Palacio de los Deportes the same day, which featured a full performance of the mixtape. It would be released to streaming services the following day on 31 July.

== Commercial performance ==
9 Months & 50 Hours opened at number one on the Billboard Top Latin Pop Albums chart for the week of 6 August 2026, with about 8,000 album-equivalent units, mostly consisting of 8.4 million streams. This marked Latin Mafia's first number one album on any albums chart, as well as being Fred Again's first appearance and number one album on a Latin albums chart. Eleven of the mixtape's fourteen tracks also debuted on the Hot Latin Pop songs chart, led by "Te Estoy Correteando" at number one. In the United Kingdom, the mixtape debuted at number sixteen on the UK Dance Albums chart.

== Track listing ==
Credits adapted from Tidal. Latin Mafia consists of Emilio de la Rosa, Miguel de la Rosa and Milton de la Rosa.

9 Months & 50 Hours track listing
| No. | Title | Writer(s) | Producer(s) | Length |
|---|---|---|---|---|
| 1. | "Hey Hey" | Fred Gibson; Latin Mafia; Benjy Gibson; Molly Rankin^{[a]}; Alexander O'Hanley^{[a]} | Fred Again; Latin Mafia; Boo; Nicolas Hill^{[a]}; William Taylor^{[a]} | 2:05 |
| 2. | "Alvafro" | F. Gibson; Latin Mafia; B. Gibson | Fred Again; Latin Mafia; Boo | 3:58 |
| 3. | "Bonita" | F. Gibson; Latin Mafia; B. Gibson | Fred Again; Latin Mafia; Boo | 3:06 |
| 4. | "Benjy Chord" | F. Gibson; Latin Mafia; B. Gibson; Paul Woolford; Fawzilla Blade; Matthew Herbert | Fred Again; Latin Mafia; Boo; Woolford | 2:45 |
| 5. | "Cmon" (Latin Mafia & Fred edit) (performed by Fred Again and Brian Eno) | F. Gibson; Latin Mafia; Brian Eno; Aaron Dessner; Winnie Raeder; Bendik Toming^{[b]}; Joy Anonymous; Leo Wyatt^{[b]}; Lydia Clowes^{[b]}; Taylor El Hage^{[b]}; Teresa Origone^{[b]} | Fred Again; Latin Mafia; Eno; Dessner; Raeder | 4:16 |
| 6. | "Quiereme" (with Bby) | F. Gibson; Latin Mafia; B. Gibson | Fred Again; Latin Mafia; Boo | 2:55 |
| 7. | "Casino143" (with IVOxygen; Rue de la Fortuna remix) | F. Gibson; Latin Mafia; B. Gibson; IVOxygen; Viljar Haugen | Fred Again; Latin Mafia; Purc; Rue de la Fortuna | 2:59 |
| 8. | "Film Scene Soundtrack" (with KatzPascale) | F. Gibson; Latin Mafia; B. Gibson | Fred Again; Latin Mafia; Boo | 2:46 |
| 9. | "Open Eye Signal (Under the Fabric)" (performed by Jon Hopkins) | Jon Hopkins | Hopkins | 4:01 |
| 10. | "Piensas en Mi" | F. Gibson; Latin Mafia; B. Gibson | Fred Again; Latin Mafia; Boo | 3:02 |
| 11. | "Halo" (with Lil Yachty) | F. Gibson; Latin Mafia; B. Gibson; Miles McCollum | Fred Again; Latin Mafia; Darcy Lewis | 3:03 |
| 12. | "Te Estoy Correteando" | F. Gibson; Latin Mafia; B. Gibson | Fred Again; Latin Mafia; Boo | 3:14 |
| 13. | "Mabe" (with Mabe Fratti) | F. Gibson; Latin Mafia; Mabe Fratti^{[c]}; Kieran Hebden | Fred Again; Latin Mafia; Hebden; Lewis | 4:54 |
| 14. | "I Wish It Wasnt" | F. Gibson; Latin Mafia; Tobias Wincorn; Matthew Otto^{[d]}; Moses Sumney^{[d]} | Fred Again; Latin Mafia; Wincorn | 3:46 |
| Total length: | | | | 46:50 |

=== Sample and interpolation credits ===
- ^{^[a]} "Hey Hey" contains an interpolation of "Archie, Marry Me", written by Molly Rankin and Alec O'Henley, as performed by Flyte.
- ^{^[b]} "Cmon" contains a sample of a previous Fred Again song, "Lydia (Please Make It Better)".
- ^{^[c]} "Mabe" contains a sample of "Todo Lo Que Querias Saber", written and performed by Mabe Fratti.
- ^{^[d]} "I Wish It Wasnt" contains a sample of "Doomed", written by Moses Sumney and Matthew Otto, as performed by Sumney.

== Personnel ==
- KatzPascale – backing vocals (tracks 2, 6, 8, 12), cello (tracks 2, 11)
- Fred Again – engineering, mastering (tracks 1-8, 10-14), mixing (tracks 1-2, 5-8, 10-12, 14)
- Matt Barnes – engineering (tracks 1-8, 10-14)
- Tom Norris – mixing (tracks 1-4, 13)
- Victor Verpillat – assistant mixing (tracks 1-4, 13)
