= Hecho Para Ti =

Single by Latin Mafia & Omar Apollo
- Released: July 24, 2025
- Genre: Cumbia
- Length: 2:32
- Label: Rimas México
- Songwriters: Omar Apollo, Milton De la Rosa, Miguel Ángel De la Rosa, Emilio De la Rosa, Tyler Spry
- Producers: Miguel Ángel De la Rosa, Tyler Spry

"Hecho Para Ti" is a cumbia song co-written and performed by the Mexican band Latin Mafia and the American singer-songwriter Omar Apollo. Latin Mafia have described the song as their "migajera" anthem, a Mexican slang term for someone who settles for crumbs in a relationship.

== Background ==
Latin Mafia and Omar Apollo first met backstage at Camp Flog Gnaw in 2024. They soon began collaborating and recording new music. In March 2025, Latin Mafia teased a snippet of "Hecho Para Ti".

In early July, Latin Mafia and Omar performed the song live for the first time and confirmed its release date. The song was released on July 24, 2025.

"Hecho Para Ti" was Latin Mafia's first new music since their 2024 debut album, Todos los días todo el día, and Omar Apollo's first new music since his prior 2025 collaboration with Malcolm Todd, "Bleed".

== Live performances ==
The song was first performed live three weeks before its release. Omar Apollo appeared as a surprise guest during Latin Mafia's show at Palacio de los Deportes in Mexico City. In early August, the artists performed the song live for the first time in the United States, when Omar joined Latin Mafia on stage at Lollapalooza in Chicago.

== Music video ==
The song's music video was directed by Aidan Cullen and executive produced by Stillz. The video is filmed in a vintage VHS style and was filmed at the Salón Tropicana in Mexico City. Remezcla described the video as channelling "the spirit of the sweaty and kitschy Mexican nightclubs from a few decades ago."

== Accolades ==
=== Year-end lists ===
Critics' rankings for Hecho Para Ti
| Publication | Accolade | Rank | Ref. |
|---|---|---|---|
| The Fader | The 51 best songs of 2025 | 9 | |
| Rolling Stone | The 50 Best Latin and Spanish-Language Songs of 2025 | 41 | |
| Rolling Stone España | 50 Grandes Canciones de 2025 | 45 | |
