= Sand (Dove Cameron song) =

2023 single by Dove Cameron

Single by Dove Cameron

from the EP Alchemical: Volume 1
- Released: November 10, 2023
- Genre: Ballad
- Length: 3:39
- Label: Disruptor; Columbia
- Songwriters: Dove Cameron; Taylor Upsahl; Isaiah Tejada; Jordan K. Johnson; Michael Pollack; Stefan Johnson
- Producers: Isaiah Tejada; The Monsters & Strangerz; Stefan Johnson

Dove Cameron singles chronology
"Lethal Woman" (2023)	"Sand" (2023)	"Too Much" (2025)

Music video
- "Sand" on YouTube

"Sand" is a song recorded by American singer Dove Cameron. It was released by Disruptor and Columbia Records on November 10, 2023, as the fourth and final single from her extended play Alchemical: Volume 1 (2023). The lyrical content of "Sand" explores a former relationship that Cameron had for four years. For the music video for "Sand", Cameron learned to play it on piano, which she was previously afraid to do since her father, who died by suicide when she was 15, was a pianist.

Cameron began writing the song as a poem in her diary and explained that within the first five minutes of meeting her ex-lover, she knew it was going to end. She explained like as time went by with him, it felt like sand falling through her fingers. Cameron was apprehensive to release the song due to the vulnerable lyrical content, but felt it was necessary for people to understand her, afraid previous singles "Boyfriend" and "Breakfast" had given them the wrong impression of her.

== Composition and release ==
Cameron wrote "Sand" about a former relationship with a man that she loved deeply. She believed she would spend the rest of her life with him and incorporated the ending of their relationship into the theme of the song. She began to form "Sand" in February 2023 as a poem in her diary. She told Hypebae that the lyrics are almost a direct conversion from the poem. She said to Teen Vogue that within the first five minutes of meeting him, she loved him, but could also guess that they were going to end in a way that would "devastate" her.

Cameron explained that the concept of the song came from the feeling of time running out and "losing sand between [her] fingers" for the four years of their relationship. Euphoria magazine remarked that Cameron is an unrequited lover in "Sand" and that the song explores "a love that is unbalanced, leading to a sort of quiet agony and emotional disparity". Cameron agreed by adding that she wrote the song about feeling her partner had more pieces of her than the desert had sand, while she had less pieces of him than could be fit onto a hand. Cameron hoped that when people heard the song, it would remind them to trust their instincts when falling for somebody, as well as to hold out "for the one where the more you give, the more they give".

There has been media speculation that "Sand" was written about Cameron's ex, Thomas Doherty. Cameron kept the subject of the track anonymous, but of them, she said: "I realized I had been the sort of person for him that was occupying a space of this great love story and archetype of the woman he's going to spend the rest of his life with but not necessarily someone he wanted to treat well in the meantime. He was seeing me as more of an object than a person and I was seeing him for the fullness of who he was. He was hiding me and saving me for later." She admitted that she was nervous to release the song due to the personal nature of the lyrics. However, she felt that she needed to make people aware of her true identity, afraid that her previous singles "Boyfriend" and "Breakfast" were giving people a false representation of her.

== Music video ==
For the "Sand" music video, Cameron learned the song on piano. She had long been afraid to learn how to play the piano, since her father was a pianist; he died by suicide when Cameron was 15. She explained to People.com that she has "always been afraid to learn to play the piano because I was afraid that it was going to make me feel too emotionally connected to him. For a long time, I've been running from the pain of losing my father. I don't know if that translates or makes any sense, but the piano was something that I neglected for a very long time because of it. He was never not playing the piano when I was home as a child. So, I wanted to learn the song on piano and wanted to really be performing it."

== Credits and personnel ==
Credits adapted from Spotify.

- Dove Cameron – vocals, songwriting
- Taylor Upsahl – songwriting
- Isaiah Tejada – songwriting, production
- Michael Pollack – songwriting
- The Monsters & Strangerz – songwriting, production

== Release history ==
Region	Date	Format	Label	Ref.
Various	November 10, 2023	Digital download; streaming	Disruptor; Columbia	
