= Final Girl (album) =

2026 album by Dove Cameron

Studio album by Dove Cameron
- Released: November 6, 2026
- Recorded: c. December 22, 2021 2024—August 2026
- Length: 34:28
- Labels: Disruptor; Columbia
- Producers: CJ Baran; Evan Blair; Harry Charles; Ilsey Juber; Mark Schick; Tyler Spry; TMS

Dove Cameron chronology
| Alchemical: Volume 1 (2023) | Final Girl (2026) |

Singles from Final Girl
- 1. "When in Rome" Released: September 9, 2026; 2. "Do the Math" Released: October 23, 2026; 3. "Breaks Open" Released: November 2, 2026

Final Girl is the debut studio album by American singer and songwriter Dove Cameron, released on November 6, 2026, through Disruptor and Columbia Records. It follows her debut extended play, Alchemical: Volume 1 (2023). The album was preceded by the release of three singles: "When in Rome", "Do the Math", and "Breaks Open".

== Background ==
In March 2018, Cameron announced that she had signed with Columbia's Disruptor Records label and that she would begin to release music following the release of Descendants 3. After various single releases, Cameron announced in 2022 that she had begun work on a musical project and released the single "Boyfriend". The song went viral on TikTok and reached top-ten in various countries. After its release, Cameron reset her public music catalog, removing her older releases from all streaming services. She also announced that would be releasing a two-part album titled Alchemical. The first half, Alchemical: Volume 1, was released on December 1, 2023. Despite plans to release the second volume to Alchemical, Cameron scrapped the idea and took a break from music. She focused on therapy and "digging and excavation" into her personal pain and depression, which she felt had helped her to shape her next music project. She also felt departed from the sound of Alchemical, stating that she was in a different place in her life and in a more positive environment.

Cameron "begged" Columbia Records numerous times to allow her to release the album.

Despite looking back and acknowledging that Alchemical was "true" for her at the time, the album remained an extended play. She described it as a "reflection of how watery and lost and dissonant" she felt and billed her debut album as "her proper musical introduction". She initially completed work on the album in June 2024, days before leaving for Montreal to film scenes in American television series 56 Days (2026). The album was expected to be released in late 2025, having stated to Nylon that once October begins, "you're f*cked! It's Christmas music. There's no chance of anyone listening to your sh*t!" In 2026, during a press tour for 56 Days, Cameron stated that Columbia Records had blocked the release of her debut album on numerous occasions. She explained that she had submitted various iterations of a completed album since signing with them in 2018, but was told each time that it was not the right time. She admitted that she was unsure if they had even listened to some of the finished drafts. However, after eight years and "begging openly, being like, what the hell? Where's the album?" with Columbia, she confirmed that they had greenlit for her to release it in 2026.

Cameron co-wrote and recorded a version of the album shortly after beginning a relationship with Italian singer Damiano David, citing their relationship as one of her inspirations throughout it. Stating that she was "very healed, very in love, feeling very safe", Cameron initially became inspired by music she had grown up with, including Marina Diamandis, Robyn, Lady Gaga and Lana Del Rey. She wanted to create "recession-pop, big radio banger sound" for the album, since it was what she was consuming in her personal life. Cameron released "Too Much" as the initial lead single on February 21, 2025. On May 2, 2025, it was followed by "French Girls". "Romeo", "Whatever You Like" and "Hello My Old Lover" followed later in 2025. Despite all five singles being marketed as singles from her debut album, they were later omitted from the final track listing of Final Girl. Cameron later stated that she did not resonate with the songs when she was assembling the track listing for the album, feeling that they were not confessional enough for the body of work.

== Promotion ==
=== Singles ===
Ten months after the release of "Hello My Old Lover", "When in Rome" was released as the lead single from Final Girl. The music video for the song ended with a dark sky that illustrated "Final Girl" written in lightning. Upon its release, it was speculated that Cameron would follow up the song with the release of "Final Girl", a track she had performed whilst opening for Dua Lipa's Radical Optimism Tour. However, on October 21, 2026, she announced the release of "Do the Math" as the second single from Final Girl; along with the album's release date and track listing later on. The song was written in 2021, with a version of the track completed on December 22, 2021. Cameron later surprise released "Breaks Open" as the third single on November 2, 2026.

=== Live performances ===
In April 2025, Cameron headlined "Everything Must Go", an online, live gig where viewers could buy memorabilia from her life and career. The livestream was to raise funds for the National Alliance on Mental Illness (NAMI). The setlist for the gig included numerous songs from Final Girl, marking it as both the first time fans had heard various songs, as well as the first time Cameron had performed them live. Then in June 2025, she supported Dua Lipa on the British and Irish legs of her Radical Optimism Tour, where she performed various songs from the body of work. In November 2026, she performed as the opening act for Sombr's You Are The Reason Tour on the final 13 shows of the North American leg of the tour, mainly showcasing songs from the album.

== Track listing ==
Final Girl track listing
| No. | Title | Writer(s) | Producer(s) | Length |
|---|---|---|---|---|
| 1. | "Silver Screen Baby" | Dove Cameron; Ilsey Juber; Madison Love; Mark Schick | Juber; Schick^{[p]} | 3:50 |
| 2. | "Emerald" | Cameron; Pete Kelleher; Ben Kohn; Violet Skies | TMS | 3:18 |
| 3. | "When in Rome" | Cameron; CJ Baran; Juber; Love; Schick | Baran; Juber; Schick | 3:04 |
| 4. | "Good on You" | Cameron; Tyler Spry; Victoria Zaro | Schick^{[p]}; Spry^{[p]} | 2:43 |
| 5. | "Do the Math" | Cameron; Evan Blair; Schick; Spry; Madi Yanofsky | Blair^{[p]}; Schick^{[p]}; Spry^{[p]} | 3:06 |
| 6. | "Hot Girl" | Cameron; Juber; Love; Schick; Eli Teplin | Juber; Schick^{[p]}; Teplin^{[a]} | 2:45 |
| 7. | "Skin Over Bone" | Cameron; Juber; Love; Schick | Juber; Schick^{[p]} | 3:10 |
| 8. | "Hands of Man" | Cameron; Kelleher; Maaike Kito Lebbing; Kohn; Skies | TMS; Kito^{[a]} | 2:52 |
| 9. | "Breaks Open" | Cameron; Tom Barnes; Annika Bennett; Megan Bülow; Sarah Hudson; Kelleher | TMS | 3:45 |
| 10. | "Immortalized" | Cameron; Love; Spry; Zaro | Harry Charles; Spry^{[p]} | 2:59 |
| 11. | "Maybe Heaven Is a Jazz Club" | Cameron; Love; Spry; Zaro; (Cameron Boyce) | Schick; Spry^{[p]} | 2:56 |
| Total length: | | | | 34:28 |

=== Notes ===
- ^{^[p]} indicates a producer and vocal producer
- ^{^[a]} indicates an additional producer

== Personnel ==
Credits are adapted from Tidal.

=== Musicians ===
- Dove Cameron – vocals (all tracks), background vocals (track 3)
- Mark Schick – programming (1, 3–7, 11), background vocals (1, 4–7); bass, electric guitar (1, 5–7); guitar (3), acoustic guitar (4, 7), keyboards (5–7), piano (5, 7)
- Ilsey Juber – background vocals (1, 6, 7), drums (6)
- Tommy King – piano (1, 11)
- Michael Lewis – saxophone (1, 11)
- Drew Taubenfeld – pedal steel guitar (1)
- Pete "Merf" Kelleher – bass, programming (2, 8, 9); drums (2, 8)
- Benjamin Kohn – keyboards, programming (2, 8, 9)
- CJ Baran – bass, programming (3)
- Ben Barter – drums (4, 5, 7)
- Tyler Spry – bass, programming (4, 5, 11); background vocals, electric guitar (4, 5); keyboards (5)
- Victoria Zaro – background vocals (4)
- Evan Blair – background vocals (5)
- Eli Teplin – keyboards (6)
- Todd Lombardo – acoustic guitar, electric guitar (7)
- Madison Love – background vocals (7)
- Dave Eggar – cello, viola, violin, orchestration, strings (9)
- Phil Faconti – conducting, orchestration (9)
- Ituni – choir (9)
- Tom Barnes – drums, programming (9)
- Matt Smile – strings (9)
- Xavi Morato – violin (9)
- Matt Chamberlain – drums (10)
- Harry Charles – piano, programming (10)

=== Technical ===
- Mark Schick – engineering (1, 3–6, 11)
- CJ Baran – engineering (3)
- Tyler Spry – engineering (4, 5, 10, 11)
- Dave Eggar – engineering (9)
- Matt Smile – engineering (9)
- Mike Stephenson – engineering (9)
- Harry Charles – engineering (10)
- Joe Henderson – engineering assistance, editing (4, 10, 11)
- Mitch McCarthy – mixing (1, 3–7, 10, 11)
- Jon Castelli – mixing (2, 8, 9)
- Nathan Dantzler – mastering
- Harrison Tate – mastering assistance (2–11)

== Charts ==
Chart performance for Final Girl
| Chart (2026) | Peak position |
|---|---|
| UK Album Downloads (Official Charts) | 31 |
