= Bad Idea (Dove Cameron song) =

2022 single by Dove Cameron

Single by Dove Cameron
- Released: October 28, 2022
- Length: 2:35
- Label: Disruptor; Columbia
- Songwriters: Dove Cameron; Evan Blair; Madi Yanofsky
- Producer: Evan Blair

Dove Cameron singles chronology
"Breakfast" (2022)	"Bad Idea" (2022)	"Girl Like Me" (2022)

"Bad Idea" is a song recorded by American singer Dove Cameron released by Disruptor and Columbia Records on October 28, 2022. Cameron has stated that the song was inspired by an intense late-night text message that she knew was a bad idea but secretly wanted to act on. She has clarified that she did not act on it and instead wrote the song from the fictional lens of someone that got back with an ex. The song was produced by frequent collaborator Evan Blair, who also worked with Cameron on previous singles "Boyfriend" and "Breakfast".

== Composition and release ==
Speaking about the making of the song, Cameron recalled receiving a late-night text message "that was so intense, and such a bad idea" that she felt compelled to create a song about it the following morning. She added that "Bad Idea" is about "the moment before diving into what could potentially be a severe crash-and-burn but deciding to take the risk anyway". In an interview with Genius, she confirmed that she did not act on the text message, but instead wrote "Bad Idea" as an outlet, not wanting to disrupt her healing journey. She explained to Genius that she sees many of her songs as "characters" and wrote this one from the lens of a laissez-faire person who can recognize a bad decision, but does not care.

Cameron co-wrote the track alongside Madi Yanofsky and frequent collaborator Evan Blair, who produced this song, as well as Cameron's prior two singles, "Boyfriend" and "Breakfast". Nylon described it as a "slinky, flashy track which has Cameron’s voice oscillating between a sultry croon and raspy whisper".

== Credits and personnel ==
Credits adapted from Spotify.

- Dove Cameron – vocals, songwriting
- Evan Blair – songwriting, production
- Madi Yanofsky – songwriting
- Alex Ghenea – mixing engineer
- Dale Becker – mastering engineer

== Release history ==
Region	Date	Format	Label	Ref.
Various	October 28, 2022	Digital download; streaming	Disruptor; Columbia	
