= Lethal Woman =

2023 single by Dove Cameron

Single by Dove Cameron

from the EP Alchemical: Volume 1
- Released: October 20, 2023
- Genre: Goth-pop
- Length: 2:06
- Label: Disruptor; Columbia
- Songwriters: Dove Cameron; Connor McDonough; Riley McDonough; Ryan Daly
- Producers: Connor McDonough; Riley McDonough; Ryan Daly

Dove Cameron singles chronology
"Other Boys" (2023)	"Lethal Woman" (2023)	"Sand" (2023)

Music video
- "Lethal Woman" on YouTube

"Lethal Woman" is a song recorded by American singer Dove Cameron. It was released by Disruptor and Columbia Records on October 20, 2023, as the third single from her extended play Alchemical: Volume 1 (2023). It follows the first singles from the project, "Boyfriend" and "Breakfast". She worked on the song with Connor McDonough, Riley McDonough and Ryan Daly, all of whom provided background vocals for it.

"Lethal Woman" is a production-heavy song with numerous key changes and sound effects including manic laughter, a gun being cocked and someone banging on a door. The lyrical content of the track explores Cameron's attraction to a woman she met on a night out, a feeling she compared to having been "cast a spell on". It was praised by critics including Dork, AP News and The Observer, while also having been billed as an ideal Halloween song.

== Composition and release ==
Cameron co-wrote the song with Connor McDonough, Riley McDonough and Ryan Daly, whom also co-produced "Lethal Woman" and provided backing vocals for the song. She originally teased the song in December 2022, with a working title of "Evil Woman". It was reworked and released almost a year later, on October 20, 2023. AP News billed the song a "club banger" that "starts with the sound of maniacal laughter and then a piano riff that could have been swiped from The Phantom of the Opera".

Speaking to AP News about "Lethal Woman", she said: "we threw everything including the kitchen sink into that song. I think my favorite thing about the song actually is that we switch keys like six times and you hardly really notice. It just adds this kind of unhinged quality that to me just really takes us over the top." It was noted by Euphoria magazine that heavy production "define this song", with manic laughter, a gun being cocked and banging at the door in various verses of the track.

Speaking about the lyrical content of the song, Cameron said that she wrote it with a woman that she met on a night out in mind. She stated that the woman "immediately cast a spell" on her and she wanted to encapsulate "that 'time stands still' lightning in a bottle moment of knowing you have no choice but to let yourself be swept away by someone's energy". It also explores her unapologetic attraction to this woman and others like her. Alongside its release, she announced her debut extended play, Alchemical: Volume 1 (2023), following singles "Boyfriend" and "Breakfast". Due to the previous two singles including queer love and feminist themes, Cameron felt it apt to open the EP's rollout with "a sexy ode to powerful women everywhere".

== Critical reception ==
The Observer described "Lethal Woman" as an "almighty opener" to Alchemical: Volume 1. They compared the song to early goth-pop Billie Eilish, "fused with a delicious, K-pop-esque sonic breakdown". The Guardian wrote that the song was reminiscent of a Disney villain and found the song fun. However, they felt that it gets "lost in the kind of Gesaffelstein-lite production that soundtracks Selling Sunset". They also found the similes in the song to be "more confusing than masochistically horny".

AP News wrote that the song could be perceived as "a bit unhinged" but appreciated that Cameron had "the sound of a young artist enjoying herself". They complimented the incorporation of a Broadway sound to the song, as well as liking Cameron "embracing naughtiness". The Honey Pop wrote that they "simply love" the song and billed it the perfect song for the Halloween season. They added that the song is "sexy and alluring" and that they "freak out every time we hear it because it’s just so good". Dork described the track as "a big ol' dramatic opening statement full of clanging and crashing electro beats and a wonderfully dead-eyed vocal – like a pop cyborg with her radar set to turbo banger".

== Credits and personnel ==
Credits adapted from Spotify.

- Dove Cameron – vocals, songwriting
- Connor McDonough – background vocals, songwriting, production
- Riley McDonough – background vocals, songwriting, production
- Ryan Daly – background vocals, songwriting, production

== Release history ==
Region	Date	Format	Label	Ref.
Various	October 20, 2023	Digital download; streaming	Disruptor; Columbia	
