= Lady Jesus =

2021 studio album by Upsahl

Studio album by Upsahl
- Released: October 8, 2021
- Genres: Alt-rock; electropop; hip-hop; R&B; rock
- Length: 26:17
- Label: Arista
- Producers: Dwilly; Pete Nappi; Jonny Shorr; Kill Dave

Upsahl chronology
Young Life Crisis (2020)	Lady Jesus (2021)

Lady Jesus is the debut studio album by American singer-songwriter Upsahl. It was released on October 8, 2021 by Arista Records. Four singles from the album, "Douchebag", "Lunatic", "Melatonin" and "Time of My Life", were released prior to the album's release, accompanied with official music videos. The album discusses and expresses anger and revenge against Upsahl's claimed ex-partner, who allegedly cheated on her and caused more drama after the incident.

== Composition ==
Upsahl found inspiration for the majority of the song's lyrics, which she all took a part in contributing herself from a dramatic break-up she faced, after figuring out that her ex-partner was privately having an affair with another woman. She teamed up with record producers Dwilly, Jonny Shorr, Kill Dave and Pete Nappi to produce 10 tracks for the album in total, which they found inspiration from musical genres like funk and punk. Most of the added songs were written during the COVID-19 pandemic in 2020.

The album explores and experiments with genres such as alternative pop, indie pop and pop rock, and uses elements of hip hop, electropop and R&B. The track "Sunny D" features vocals of Elijah Noll.

== Track listing ==
No.	Title	Writer(s)	Producer	Length
1.	"Douchebag"	Dwilly; Upsahl	Dwilly	2:22
2.	"Melatonin"	Upsahl; Elijah Noll; Pete Nappi	Pete Nappi	3:07
3.	"Time of My Life"	Upsahl; Sean Kennedy; Nappi	Nappi	2:16
4.	"Lunatic"	Jonny Shorr; Upsahl; Will Jay	Jonny Shorr	2:21
5.	"Thriving"	Shorr; Upsahl; Jay	Shorr	2:15
6.	"Notorious"	Noll; Upsahl; Nappi	Nappi	2:38
7.	"IDFWFEELINGS"	Kennedy; Kill Dave; Upsahl	Kill Dave	3:02
8.	"Sunny D"	Noll; Upsahl; Nappi	Nappi	3:23
9.	"Last Supper"	Jay; Shorr; Noll; Upsahl	Shorr	2:38
10.	"Lady Jesus"	Shorr; Jay; Upsahl	Shorr	2:15
Total length:				26:17
