= Mabe Fratti =

Guatemalan musician (born 1991)

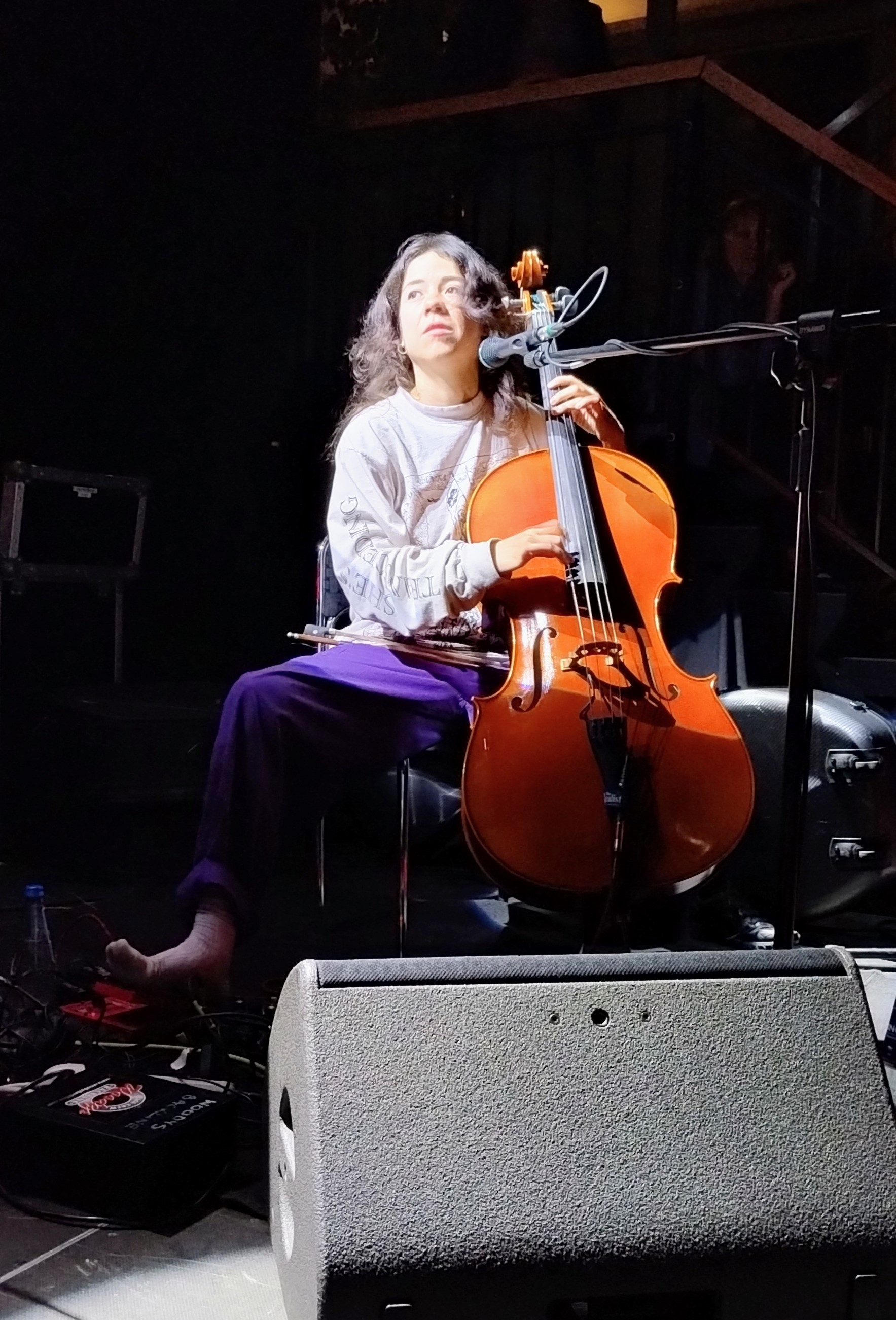
- Mabe Fratti in Warsaw (2024)

Background information
- Born: María Belén Fratti Sierra; February 13, 1992 (age 34), Guatemala
- Genres: Avant-garde; experimental
- Instruments: Cello, vocals
- Member of: Amor Muere; Titanic
- Website: Mabe Fratti

Mabe Fratti (born 1992) is a Guatemalan cellist and vocalist. She is best known for her solo material and for being one half of the duo Titanic with guitarist Hector Tosta. Known for working within a wide variety of genres, her work includes collaborations with artists such as Bill Orcutt, Gudrun Gut and Efterklang.

== Life and career ==
Born in Guatemala, and raised in a Pentecostal family, Fratti was classically trained in cello and limited to listening to either Christian or classical music by her parents until she discovered file sharing through LimeWire. Also more avant-garde elements were introduced to her like a György Ligeti record "randomly" brought home by her father, and a DVD by cellist Jacqueline du Pré she found in a record store. She began creating her own music as a teenager, and upon leaving the church expanded into playing styles as varied as rock, reggae, blues, and funk, with the cello she uses now being a gift from her school.

In 2015, a Goethe Institute residency took her to Mexico to work on her music. Through this residency and move she performed with more musicians such as established artists Libertad Figueroa, Gudrun Gut and Julian Bonequi, and got involved in the Mexico City improvisational music scene. She met future members of Amore Muere and fellow musician and member of Titanic Héctor Tosta, then of La Vida Bohème.

In 2019, Fratti produced her first album, Pies Sobre La Tierra, under Mexican independent label Hole Records founded by experimental band Tajak. This was followed up by Será Que Ahora Podremos Entendernos in 2021, collaborating for album with composer Claire Rousay and the members of the experimental band Tajak. Fratti's subsequent 2022 album Se Ve Desde Aquí has been referred to as "mind blowing" by fellow experimental artist Oneohtrix Point Never.

She went on to collaborate with partner Hector Tosta as Titanic in 2023, producing Vidrio, an album described as "somewhere between jazz and chamber pop".

In 2023, Amor Muere released A Time to Love, a Time to Die. Fratti had formed this musical collective with artists Concepción Huerta, Gibrana Cervantes and Camille Mandoki, creating works over a period of years. Due to each member's existing work it has been described as an "experimental supergroup".

She released the album Almost Waking with Bill Orcutt in 2026, after she mentioned admiring the musician which prompted him to reach out and propose they work together. Fred Again and Latin Mafia sampled her in their collaborative mixtape "9 Months & 50 Hours".

== Discography ==
Solo

- Pies Sobre La Tierra (2019)
- Será Que Ahora Podremos Entendernos (2021)
- Se Ve Desde Aquí (2022)
- Sentir Que No Sabes (2024)

Titanic

- Vidrio (2023)
- Hagen (2025)

Amore Muere

- A Time to Love, a Time to Die (2023)

Other collaborations

- Fred again.., LATIN MAFIA, Mabe Fratti - Mabe (2026)
- Mabe Fratti and Bill Orcutt – Almost Waking (2026)
- Efterklang – Things We Have in Common (2024)
- Phét Phét Phét – Shimmer (2023)
- Mabe Fratti and Concepción Huerta – Estática (2022) [Extended play]
- Gudrun Gut and Mabe Fratti – Let's Talk About the Weather (2021)
