= Bill Orcutt =

American guitarist and composer (born 1962)

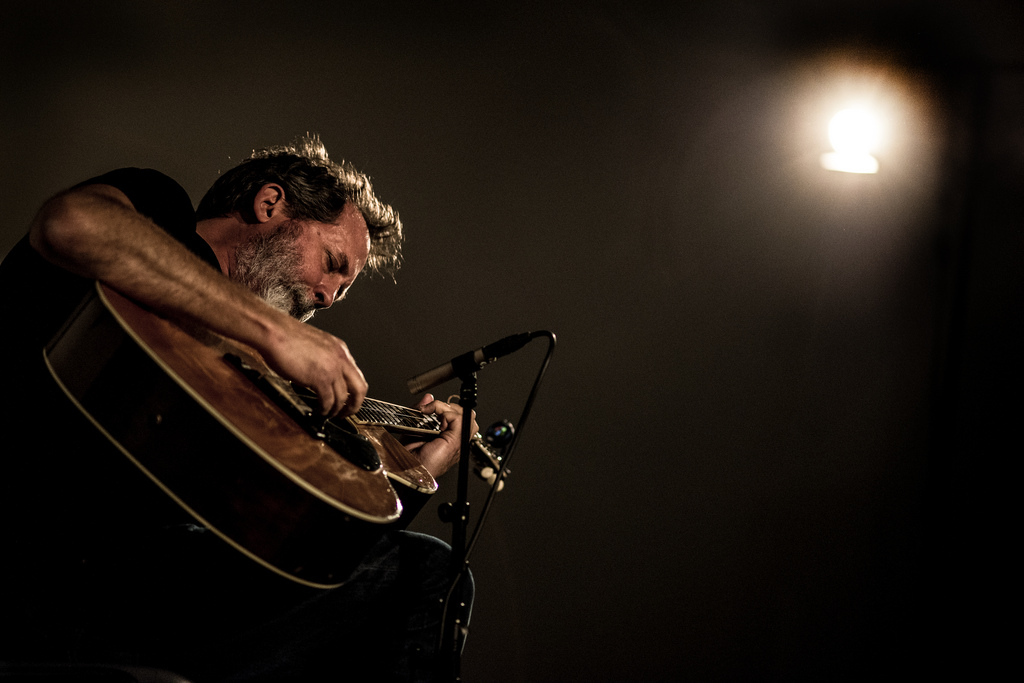
- Orcutt performing in 2014

Background information
- Born: February 2, 1962 (age 64); Miami, Florida, US
- Genre: Free improvisation
- Occupation: Musician
- Instrument: Guitar
- Years active: 1992–present
- Website: palilalia.com

Bill Orcutt (born February 2, 1962) is an American guitarist and composer whose work combines elements of blues, punk, and free improvisation.

== Biography ==
Inspired by seeing Muddy Waters in The Last Waltz, Orcutt began playing the guitar as a teenager in Miami. An early group, between 1989-1991, was Orcutt with drummer Tim Koffley. An aborted 2021 release It's All Meat comprised recordings prior to Orcutt with Koffley and vocalist Lloyd Johnson, with whom he was also in Miami’s Trash Monkeys. Orcutt is quoted as saying this was "almost a band".

In 1992, he formed the band Harry Pussy with his wife, Cuban/American drummer and vocalist Adris Hoyos. The group recorded three LPs and toured the US frequently, often in support of indie bands like Sonic Youth and Sebadoh. Their music, which drew from American no wave, hardcore punk and free jazz was influential and "served as a progenitor for the Noise movement." In 1997 the band dissolved and the couple divorced.

Orcutt moved to San Francisco and took a long hiatus from music (bar the shortlived KKYLP project), returning in 2009, with an LP of solo guitar entitled A New Way to Pay Old Debts which was well received, ranking third of 2009 in The Wire's annual "Rewind" list. His follow-up release How the Thing Sings was similarly praised, reaching number 3 on NPR's The Best Outer Sound Albums of 2011.

Orcutt has issued a great many cassettes and singles in highly limited editions, usually through his labels Fake Estates and Palilalia Records. Fake Estates principally covers music produced through Cracked, an open source audio programme which he published in 2016. He describes it as a "free app for Mac OS. It’s a JavaScript library and live coding environment for sound making".

Since 2009, Orcutt has toured often appearing at festivals in the US and Europe, including Hopscotch, Incubate, Le Nouveau Festival du Centre Pompidou, Hardly Strictly Bluegrass, Donau and Big Ears. Typically a solo performer, Orcutt has also recorded or performed with Loren Mazzacane Connors, Chris Corsano, Peter Brötzmann and Alan & Richard Bishop.

== Discography ==
~ denotes a recording using Cracked.

=== Solo albums ===
- Untitled (Audible Hiss, 1996)
- A New Way to Pay Old Debts (Palilalia Records, 2009; reissued in 2011)
- How the Thing Sings (Editions Mego, 2011)
- A History of Every One (Editions Mego, 2013)
- Twenty Five Songs (Palilalia Records, 2013) released as a box of thirteen 7" singles
- Solo Acoustic Volume Ten (VDSQ/Thin Wrist, 2014)
- Cracked Music (Fake Estates, 2016)~
- An Account of the Crimes Of Peter Thiel And His Subsequent Arrest, Trial And Execution (Fake Estates, 2017)~
- Bill Orcutt (Palilalia Records, 2017; reissued 2011)
- Why Four Strings? (Palilalia Records, 2017) compilation
- Neu Bros/OK Phone/Rural Beatles (Fake Estates, 2018)
- Live in LA (Fake Estates, 2019)~
- Odds Against Tomorrow (Palilalia Records, 2019)
- Slow Troll (Fake Estates, 2020)~
- Reasons I Am Great (Palilalia Records, 2020)
- A Mechanical Joey (Fake Estates, 2021)
- The Entertainer B/W New Words from the OED (Fake Estates, 2022) (compilation)
- Music for Four Guitars (Palilalia Records, 2022)
- The Anxiety of Symmetry (Palilalia Records, 2023)
- Jump on It (Palilalia Records, 2023)
- The Four Louies (Palilalia Records, 2024)
- How to rescue things (Palilalia Records, 2024)
- Another Perfect Day (Palilalia Records, 2025)
- Music in Continuous Motion (Palilalia Records, 2026)

=== Collaborations/split releases ===
- The Raw and the Cooked (Palilalia Records, 2013) with Chris Corsano
- Road Stories (Unrock, 2014) with Sir Richard Bishop
- Live at Various (Palilalia Records, 2014; vinyl release, 2016) with Chris Corsano
- Colonial Donuts (Palilalia Records, 2015) with Jacob Felix Heule
- Various Live (Palilalia Records, 2015; vinyl release, 2016) with Chris Corsano
- Parallelogram (Three Lobed Recordings, 2015) with Chris Corsano and Alan Bishop
- Live in New York (Palilalia Records, 2015) with Circuit Des Yeux
- Electric Guitar Duets (Land and Sea, 2016; vinyl release, 2020) with Michael Morley (musician)
- Live at Cafe Oto (Otoroku, 2016) with Okkyung Lee
- OKK/OTT (Palilalia Records, 2017) with Okkyung Lee
- One Dollar Hits (Fake Estates, 2018; CD release, 2019)~ with Chris Corsano
- Gucci Tops and Bottoms (Fake Estates, 2018; CD release, 2019)~ with Chris Corsano
- Brace Up! (Palilalia Records, 2018) with Chris Corsano
- Electric Smog (Unrock, 2019) with Chris Corsano
- Made Out of Sound (Palilalia Records, 2021) with Chris Corsano
- For Bill Who Will Be 100 In The Year 2062 (Palilalia Records, 2022) with Tashi Dorji
- Hemlock Tavern (Palilalia Records, 2022) with Chris Corsano
- The Flower School (Palilalia Records, 2023) with Chris Corsano and Zoh Amba
- Play at Duke (Palilalia Records, 2023) with Chris Corsano
- A Mouth at Both Ends (Palilalia Records, 2023) with Tashi Dorji and Joe McPhee
- Four Guitars Live (Palilalia Records, 2024) with the Bill Orcutt Guitar Quartet
- Live at Big Ears (Palilalia Records, 2024) with Chris Corsano
- At Land and Sea (Palilalia Records, 2024) with Alan Licht
- Play Paris and Glasgow (Palilalia Records, 2024) with Okkyung Lee
- Soundtrack for New York Ghetto Fishmarket 1903 (Palilalia Records, 2024) with Danishta Rivero and Jacob Felix Heule
- Almost Waking (Unheard of Hope, 2026) with Mabe Fratti

=== Solo cassettes ===
- Why Does Everybody Love Free Music but Nobody Loves Free People? (Palilalia Records, 2012; vinyl release, 2018)
- My Friends When I'm Not There (Palilalia Records, 2014; vinyl release, 2018)
- Gerty Loves Pussy (Palilalia Records, 2014; vinyl release, 2015)
- Two Weeks in Another Town (Palilalia Records, 2014)
- Daddy's Got a Spice Rack (Chocolate Monk, 2014; CDr release. 2017)
- Recent Chrome Exploits (Fake Estates, 2015)~
- Plays Songs (Palilalia Records, 2015)
- Lonely People (Palilalia Records, 2015)
- Live at Constellation (Palilalia Records, 2017)
- Live at No Response (No Response, 2018)
- Pure Genius (Chocolate Monk, 2020)~
- Warszawa (Endless Happiness/Palilalia Records, 2020)
- Real Feel Geel Reel (Taping Policies/Palilalia Records, 2020)
- Empire of Hurt Feelings (Superpang, 2021)
- Roasted Memories (Palilalia Records, 2022)
