= Too Much (Dove Cameron song) =

2025 single by Dove Cameron

Single by Dove Cameron
- Released: February 21, 2025
- Recorded: c. March 2024
- Genre: Electropop
- Length: 2:51
- Label: Disruptor; Columbia
- Songwriters: Dove Cameron; Madison Love; Tyler Spry; Victoria Zaro
- Producer: Tyler Spry

Dove Cameron singles chronology
"Sand" (2023)	"Too Much" (2025)	"French Girls" (2025)

Visualizer
- "Too Much" on YouTube

"Too Much" is a song recorded by American singer and songwriter Dove Cameron, released by Disruptor and Columbia on February 21, 2025. Cameron based the song around an unsupportive partner from her past who believed that she was too much, whom she later realized was not enough for her. The song marked Cameron's first release since December 2023, and was originally planned to be the lead single to her debut album.

== Background ==
In 2022, Cameron had a breakout with her music with the single "Boyfriend". It went viral on TikTok and reached the top-ten of music charts in various countries. After its release, Cameron reset her public music catalog, removing her older releases from streaming services. Her first extended play, Alchemical: Volume 1, was released on December 1, 2023.

Despite plans to release a second volume to Alchemical, Cameron scrapped the idea and took a break from music. She focused on therapy and "digging and excavation" into her personal pain and depression, which she felt had helped her to shape her upcoming debut studio album. She also felt departed from the sound of Alchemical, stating that she was in a different place in her life and in a more positive environment.

== Composition and release ==
In an interview with Billboard, Cameron stated that "Too Much" is about an unsupportive ex-boyfriend of hers. Fans believe this to be about Ryan McCartan, who had been Cameron's boyfriend from 2013 till 2016. She recounted a night out with friends and her boyfriend at the time, where she expressed her joy at the night after getting into the taxi with him. He replied: "You know, people like you better when you talk less", which made Cameron worry that she read the night wrong and that people disliked her. She found the song to be a "retcon" and what she wished she told him at the time. She added: "I had a realization one day that it's not my job to make myself smaller to fit into a shape that you're more comfortable holding. I just hope that anyone who's young and struggling with feeling like they are too huge, too big wherever they go, they would hear this."

Music publications characterized "Too Much" as an electropop song and drew comparisons the early works of Lady Gaga and Marina Diamandis. The song marked a sonic shift for Cameron, whose prior releases had been noted for their "breathy siren" sound. Nylon recognised "Too Much" for "unleashing a full-throated sendoff". In January 2025, Cameron posted portions of "Too Much" on various social media channels, with the clips notably gaining attention on TikTok. She eventually released the song on February 21, 2025.

Although initially marketed as the lead single from her debut album, it was later omitted from the final track listing upon the release of Final Girl (2026). Cameron later stated that she did not resonate with the song when she was assembling the track listing for the album, feeling that it was not confessional enough for the body of work.

== Credits and personnel ==
Credits adapted from Spotify.

- Dove Cameron – vocals, songwriting
- Madison Love – songwriting
- Tyler Spry – songwriting, production
- Victoria Zaro – songwriting
- Tom Norris – mixing engineer
- Dale Becker – mastering engineer

== Charts ==
=== Weekly charts ===
Weekly chart performance for "Too Much"
Chart (2025)	Peak position
Ecuador Anglo Airplay (Monitor Latino)	10
Greece International (IFPI)	88
Lithuania Airplay (TopHit)	41
New Zealand Hot Singles (RMNZ)	9
UK Singles (Official Charts)	95
US Dance Digital Song Sales (Billboard)	4
US Hot Dance/Pop Songs (Billboard)	6

=== Year-end charts ===
Year-end chart performance for "Too Much"
Chart (2025)	Position
US Hot Dance/Pop Songs (Billboard)	23

== Certifications ==
Certifications for "Too Much"
Region	Certification	Certified units/sales
Hungary (MAHASZ)	Gold	2,000^{‡}
^{‡} Sales+streaming figures based on certification alone.

== Release history ==
Release history for "Too Much"
Region	Date	Format	Label	Ref.
Various	February 21, 2025	Digital download; streaming	Disruptor; Columbia	
Italy	March 7, 2025	Radio airplay	Sony Italy	
