= Upsahl =

American singer-songwriter (born 1998)

UPSAHL
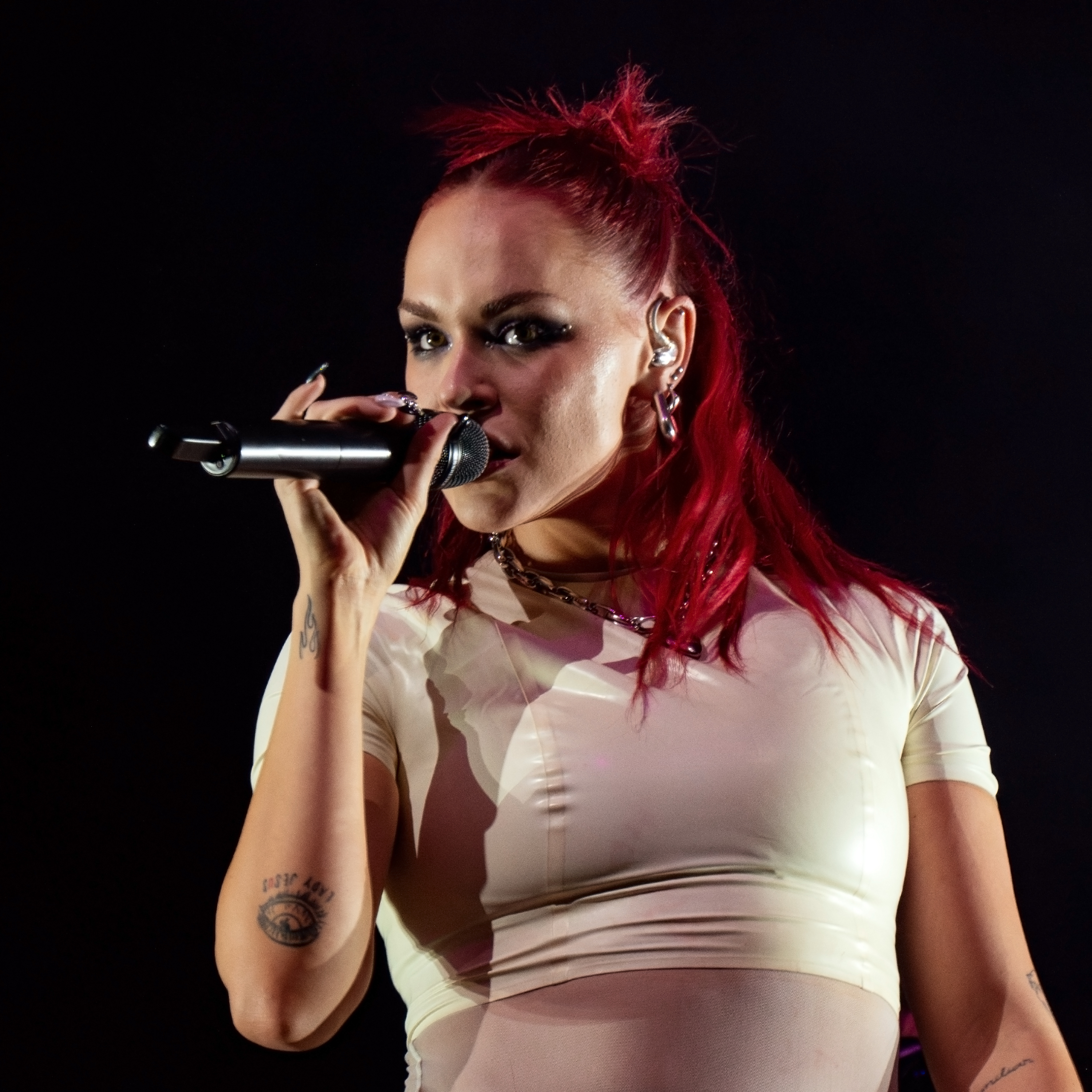
- Upsahl in 2024

Background information
- Born: Taylor Cameron Upsahl; November 28, 1998 (age 27); Phoenix, Arizona, US
- Genres: Indie pop; pop rock; alternative rock; pop-punk; alternative pop
- Occupations: Singer; songwriter
- Years active: 2011–present
- Labels: Earth Sound; Arista
- Website: upsahl.com

Taylor Cameron Upsahl (/ˈʌpsɑːl/; born November 28, 1998), known mononymously as Upsahl (stylized as UPSAHL), is an American singer-songwriter from Phoenix, Arizona.

She began releasing music during her early teens using her full name, with her first single "Disturbance" released in 2011. She had released three albums before signing with Arista Records. In 2021, she released Lady Jesus, her major-label debut studio album. She has also released three EPs, Hindsight 20/20 (2019), Young Life Crisis (2020), and Sagittarius (2022), and a mixtape, UPSAHL Presents: The PHX Tapes (2023).

== Early life ==
Born and raised in Phoenix, Arizona, Upsahl started playing both the guitar and piano at the age of five. She attended Arizona School for the Arts and is classically trained in piano, guitar, and voice.

== Career ==
=== Early career ===
As Taylor Upsahl, she self-released her first single, "Disturbance", in 2011. She then released her self-titled album, Taylor Upsahl, in 2013. In 2015, she wrote and self-produced her second full-length album Viscerotonic. In 2017, her third album Unfamiliar Light was released, her first under the moniker Upsahl. As of 2026, all of her first three albums are unavailable from major streaming platforms. She quickly became a local favorite for national touring acts in Phoenix. Upsahl played the McDowell Mountain Music Festival in 2017, opening for The Shins, Beck, and Flume, and released her single, "Can You Hear Me Now", that year.

=== 2018-2020: Hindsight 20/20 and Young Life Crisis ===
She signed a recording deal with Arista Records in the summer of 2018. She was the first artist signed to the newly re-launched record label.

On March 8, 2019, she released her debut EP Hindsight 20/20 along with her single "Drugs". She toured as the opening act for Pvris throughout the US in 2019.

In 2020, Upsahl released the single "12345SEX". This was followed by the singles "People I Don't Like" and "MoneyOnMyMind", both songs were included on her second EP, Young Life Crisis.

=== 2021-2022: Lady Jesus ===
In 2021, she released the singles "Douchebag", "Melatonin", "Time of my Life", and "Lunatic". They are featured on her major-label debut studio album, Lady Jesus, which was released on October 8, 2021.

In 2022, she contributed the song "My Time to Shine" to the soundtrack of the movie Bullet Train (film).

Upsahl toured as an opening act for Olivia O'Brien in 2021, for Yungblud and FLETCHER in 2022 and for Tove Lo, and Melanie Martinez in Europe, the UK and Australia, in 2023.

=== 2023-2024: The PHX Tapes ===
In July 2023, Upsahl featured in a different version of K-pop girl group Le Sserafim's song Eve, Psyche & the Bluebeard's Wife.

=== 2025-present: Independent artist ===
In February 2025, Upsahl announced that Arista Records had released her from her deal at her request.

== Discography ==
=== Albums ===
List of long plays with details
Title	Details
Taylor Upsahl	Released: November 1, 2013; Label: Self-released; Format: Digital download, streaming
Viscerotonic	Released: July 4, 2015; Label: Earth Sound; Format: Digital download, CD, streaming
Unfamiliar Light	Released: February 26, 2017; Label: Earth Sound; Format: Digital download, LP, CD, streaming
Lady Jesus	Released: October 8, 2021; Label: Arista; Format: Digital download, LP, streaming

=== Extended plays ===
List of extended plays with details
Title	Details
Hindsight 20/20	Released: March 8, 2019; Label: Arista; Format: Digital download, streaming
Young Life Crisis	Released: December 15, 2020; Label: Arista; Format: Digital download, streaming
Sagittarius	Released: December 9, 2022; Label: Arista; Format: Digital download, streaming
UPSAHL PRESENTS: THE PHX TAPES	Released: October 20, 2023; Label: Arista; Format: Digital download, streaming

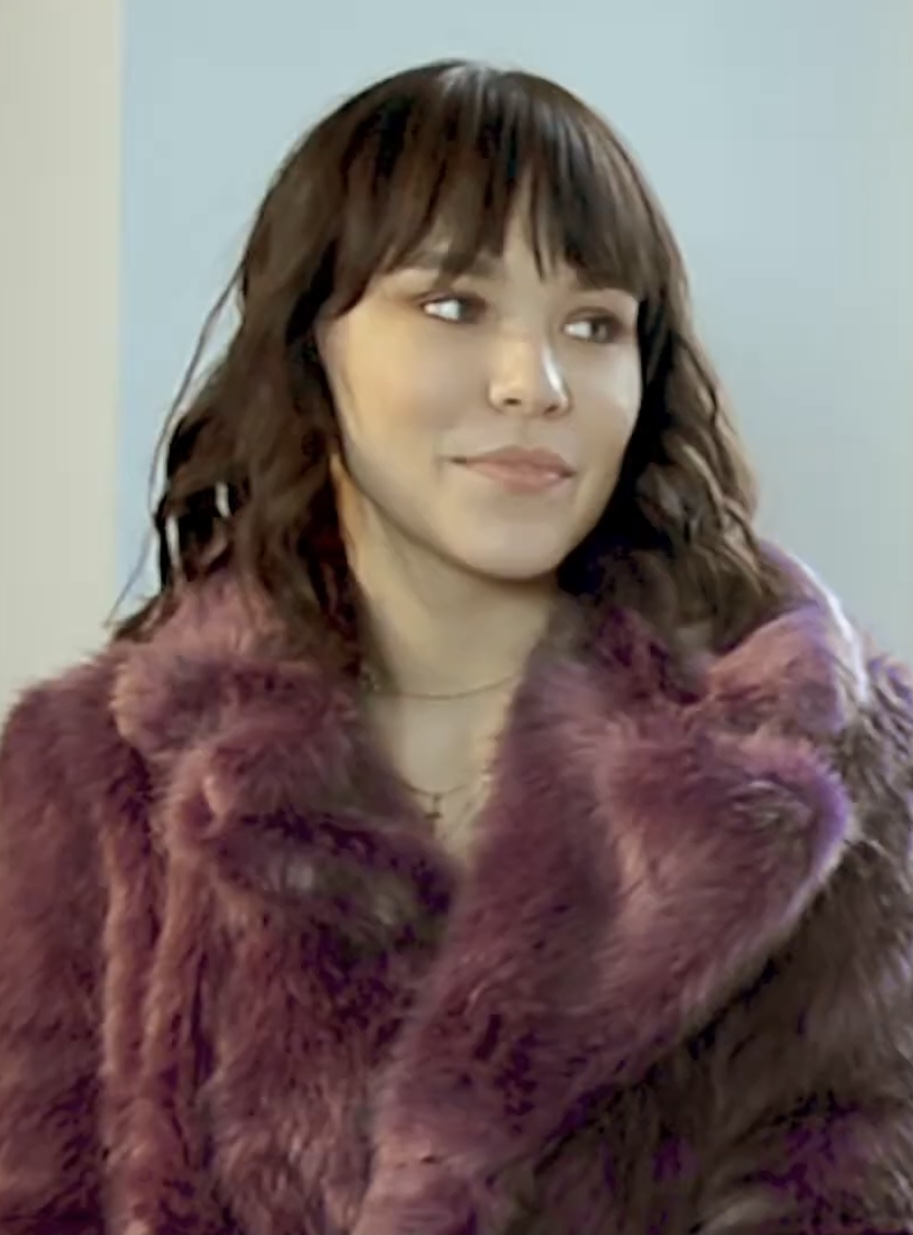
Upsahl in 2019

=== Singles ===
==== As lead artist ====
List of singles as lead artist, showing year released, peak chart positions, and album title
Title	Year	Peak chart positions	Album
Title	Year	US Rock	Album
"Disturbance"	2011	—	Taylor Upsahl
"Move On"	2011	—	Taylor Upsahl
"The Yes Knows"	2013	—	Taylor Upsahl
"11:11"	2013	—	Taylor Upsahl
"Sunflower"	2014	—	Viscerotonic
"Rough"	2018	—	Non-album singles
"Kiss Me Now"	2018	—	Non-album singles
"Can You Hear Me Now"	2018	—	Non-album singles
"The Other Team"	2018	—	Non-album singles
"Drugs"	2019	31	Hindsight 20/20
"Wish You'd Make Me Cry"	2019	—	Non-album singles
"Smile for the Camera"	2019	—	Non-album singles
"12345Sex"	2020	—	Non-album singles
"People I Don't Like"	2020	—	Young Life Crisis
"MoneyOnMyMind" (with Absofacto)	2020	—	Young Life Crisis
"Stop!"	2021	—	Non-album single
"Douchebag"	2021	—	Lady Jesus
"Melatonin"	2021	—	Lady Jesus
"Time of my Life"	2021	—	Lady Jesus
"Lunatic"	2021	—	Lady Jesus
"Lady Jesus"	2021	—	Lady Jesus
"Monica Lewinsky"	2022	—	Non-album single
"Antsy"	2022	—	Sagittarius
"Into My Body"	2022	—	Sagittarius
"Good Girl Era (Side A)"	2023	—	Upsahl Presents: The VHX Tapes V1
"Condoms (Side B)"	2023	—	Upsahl Presents: The VHX Tapes V1
"Summer so hot"	2024	—	Non-album single
"Tears on the dancefloor"	2024		Non-album single
"Topic"	2026	—	Non-album single

==== As featured artist ====
List of singles as lead artist, showing year released, peak chart positions, and album title
Title	Year	Peak chart positions	Album
Title	Year	US Rock	Album
"Happy Endings" (Mike Shinoda featuring Iann Dior and Upsahl)	2021	50	TBA
"Palm Reader" (Dreamers and Big Boi featuring Upsahl)	2021	—	TBA
"Let There Be Drums" (Feder and UPSAHL)	2021	—	TBA

=== Songwriting credits ===
Song	Year	Artist(s)	Album
"Good in Bed"	2020	Dua Lipa	Future Nostalgia
"Boyshit"	2020	Madison Beer	Life Support
"High Life"	2021	Fuller	TBA
"Kiss My (Uh Oh)"	2021	Anne-Marie and Little Mix	Therapy
"Glowin' Up"	2021	Sofia Carson	My Little Pony: A New Generation
"Villain"	2022	Bella Poarch	Dolls EP
"Whatshisface"	2022	OSTON	Whatshisface
"e-z"	2022	GAYLE	a study of the human experience volume one
"Colorado"	2022	Reneé Rapp	Everything to Everyone
"Don't Tell My Mom"	2022	Reneé Rapp	Everything to Everyone
"Moon"	2022	Reneé Rapp	Everything to Everyone
"sloppy"	2022	KiNG MALA	Honey Catching Season
"SAD B!TCH"	2023	Anne-Marie	Unhealthy
"SWINE"	2023	Demi Lovato	TBA
"23"	2023	Reneé Rapp	Snow Angel
"Sand"	2023	Dove Cameron	Alchemical: Volume 1
"Pink Noise"	2023	Zoe Ko	Baby Teeth - EP
"Hot Mess"	2024	Taeyeon	Letter To Myself
"K Bye"	2025	Kiss of Life	224
"Dirty Work"	2025	Aespa	Dirty Work
"Silly Boy"	2025	XO	Fashionably Late
"Loud"	2026	Nmixx	Heavy Serenade
"Starstruck”	2026	Fifty Fifty	Imperfect-I'mperfect
"Lemonade"	2026	Aespa	Lemonade
"Bizarre"	2026	Madonna	Confessions II
"Favorite Song"	2026	Meovv	Bite Now
"What Else?"	2026	Chelsea Cutler	Is This The End?
