= Sentir Que No Sabes =

Studio album by Mabe Fratti
- Released: 28 June 2024
- Studio: Soy Sauce; Pedro y El Lobo; Tinho; Willem Twee
- Length: 41:49
- Language: Spanish
- Label: Unheard of Hope
- Producer: I. La Católica

Mabe Fratti chronology
Se Ve Desde Aquí (2022)	Sentir Que No Sabes (2024)

Sentir Que No Sabes (transl. Feel(ing) Like You Don't Know) is the fourth studio album by Guatemalan cellist Mabe Fratti, released on 28 June 2024 through Unheard of Hope. It was produced by I. La Católica and received positive reviews from critics.

== Critical reception ==
Professional ratings
Aggregate scores
Source	Rating
Metacritic	86/100
Review scores
Source	Rating
Beats Per Minute	86%
Exclaim!	8/10
The Guardian	5/5 stars
Mojo	4/5 stars
Pitchfork	8.4/10
The Skinny	5/5 stars
Uncut	8/10

Sentir Que No Sabes received a score of 86 out of 100 on review aggregator Metacritic based on 10 critics' reviews, which the website categorized as "universal acclaim". Mojo commented that "further enriched by the palate of Fratti's cello and Tosta's brass, Sentir... is an extraordinarily possessed, uncanny world of its own". Uncut felt that "Fratti delivers some of her most musically and emotionally rich work to date here, her dreamy voice and impressionistic Spanish-language lyrics adding an extra layer of magical realism."

Alexis Petridis of The Guardian named it his album of the week, describing it as "rich, rewarding, spellbinding music" and "abundantly melodic, constantly surprising and unequivocally fantastic". Tony Inglis of The Skinny wrote that on the album, "Fratti's songs are fluid, slippery objects. They take genre – dream pop, jazz, contemporary classical – and turn it inside out, delivering familiar thrills in unrecognisable guises", all with "a confident sense of rhythm".

Exclaim!'s Eric Hill said that "the full array of her influences and interests are on display" and that "the album's quest for answers, or more questions, present a challenge for those who prefer a more cohesive experience". Skye Butchard of The Quietus observed that "the sparser tracks are just as strong" and "it's all so assured, yet Fratti never returns to the same thought for long". The Wire opined that "sometimes the music lingers too long in the in-between places, as though it's not sure where it's going. It probably doesn't make sense for music that deals in ambivalence to be settled in itself, but some listeners may require a tiny bit more to believe in."

Isabelia Herrera of Pitchfork found that "Fratti moves closer to the silhouettes of pop and rock than ever before. These songs start to follow more discernible and familiar forms—although she continues to luxuriate in the oblique." Reviewing the album for Beats Per Minute, John Amen opened his review by writing that Fratti "juxtaposes balmy euphonies and startling discordance, her instrumental choices unfurling as precise complements to her vocal and lyrical forays". He concluded, "Vocally, lyrically, and sonically, Fratti captures the way in which the micro and macro are forever colliding, shrinking, erupting, dissolving around us and, more pressingly, within us."

== Track listing ==
All tracks are written by Mabe Fratti.

Sentir Que No Sabes track listing
No.	Title	Length
1.	"Kravitz"	4:33
2.	"Pantalla Azul"	2:57
3.	"Elastica II"	2:20
4.	"Oídos"	3:26
5.	"Quieras o No"	2:52
6.	"Enfrente"	4:03
7.	"Elastica I"	1:59
8.	"Márgen de Índice"	2:41
9.	"Alarmas Olvidadas"	3:51
10.	"Descubrimos un Suspiro"	3:37
11.	"Intento Fallido"	2:52
12.	"Kitana"	1:18
13.	"Angel Nuevo"	5:20
Total length:		41:49

== Personnel ==
- Mabe Fratti – cello, vocals, synthesizers, recording
- I. La Católica – production, arrangements, guitar, piano, bass, synthesizers
- Jacob Wick – trumpet
- Gibrán Andrade – drums
- Estrella del Sol – whistle
- Santiago Parra – mixing
- Mason le Long – mastering
- Marco Carrión Alpuche – recording
- Santiago Parra – recording
- Rikkert Brok – recording assistance
- Hans Kulk – recording assistance
- Kevin Frank – photography
- Luis Dubón – design

== Charts ==
Chart performance for Sentir Que No Sabes
Chart (2024)	Peak position
UK Album Downloads (OCC)	46
