= Tyler Spry =

American record producer and songwriter

- Born: Tyler Spry; 1993; Mission Viejo, CA
- Genres: Pop music; alternative pop; dance pop; reggaeton; indie rock; alternative rock; R&B; hip hop
- Occupations: Producer; songwriter; engineer; multi-instrumentalist
- Years active: 2016-present
- Publisher: Runner Music

Tyler Spry is an American record producer, songwriter, multi-instrumentalist, and recording engineer. He has co-written and produced songs for artists including Bad Bunny, BTS, Tate McRae, OneRepublic, Karol G, Rauw Alejandro, Omar Apollo, Latin Mafia, Katseye, and David Guetta, among others.

== Career ==
Spry began his career as a musician and engineer. In 2016 he worked with producer, songwriter, and OneRepublic bandmates Ryan Tedder and Brent Kutzle. As they continued to work together, Spry's role expanded to songwriter and producer, and in 2021 he co-wrote, co-produced, and contributed to nine tracks on the OneRepublic album Human. In 2022 he co-wrote and co-produced One Republic's "I Ain't Worried". The song, which appeared on the Top Gun: Maverick soundtrack, was nominated for International Song of the Year at the 2023 Brit Awards. Tedder signed Spry to Runner Music, his publishing company, in 2024.

In 2025, Spry co-wrote and co-produced two tracks on Bad Bunny's Debí Tirar Más Fotos, including the title track "DtMF". "DtMF" debuted at #1 Billboard Global 200, and the album debuted at #1 on the US Billboard 200. Spry won a Latin Grammy for "DtMF" in 2025, and in 2026, as a producer and songwriter on Debí Tirar Más Fotos, he won Grammy awards for Album of the Year and Best Música Urbana Album. He was also Grammy-nominated for Tate McRae's "Just Keep Watching."

BTS released Arirang, their fifth studio album, in March 2026; Spry co-wrote and co-produced the lead single, "Swim", and the album track "Please".

== Selected discography ==
| Year | Artist | Album | Song | Credits | Ref. |
|---|---|---|---|---|---|
| 2019 | Switchfoot | Native Tongue | Album | Engineer, producer, songwriter | |
| 2021 | OneRepublic | Human | Album | Songwriter, producer, | |
| 2022 | OneRepublic | Top Gun: Maverick | "I Ain't Worried" | Songwriter, producer | |
| 2022 | Portugal. The Man | Non-album single | "What, Me Worry?" | Songwriter, producer | |
| 2023 | Tate McRae | Think Later | Album | Songwriter, producer | |
| 2023 | Tate McRae | Think Later | "Exes" | Songwriter, producer | |
| 2024 | Karol G and Tiësto | Non-album single | "Contigo" | Songwriter, producer | |
| 2024 | Rauw Alejandro | Cosa Nuestra | "Déjame Entrar" | Songwriter, producer | |
| 2024 | Rauw Alejandro | Cosa Nuestra | "Amar de Nuevo" | Songwriter, producer | |
| 2024 | Rauw Alejandro | Cosa Nuestra | Album | Songwriter, producer | |
| 2024 | David Guetta and OneRepublic | Artificial Paradise (deluxe) | "I Don't Wanna Wait" | Songwriter, producer | |
| 2024 | Katseye | Soft Is Strong | "Debut" | Songwriter, producer | |
| 2025 | Bad Bunny | Debí Tirar Más Fotos | DtMF | Songwriter, producer | |
| 2025 | Bad Bunny | Debí Tirar Más Fotos | "Kloufrens" | Songwriter, producer | |
| 2025 | Omar Apollo and Latin Mafia | Non-album single | "Hecho Para Ti" | Songwriter, producer | |
| 2025 | Tate McRae | F1: The Album | "Just Keep Watching" | Songwriter, producer | |
| 2025 | Dove Cameron | Non-album singles | "Too Much" | Songwriter, producer | |
| 2025 | Dove Cameron | Non-album singles | "French Girls" | Songwriter, producer | |
| 2025 | Dove Cameron | Non-album singles | "Whatever You Like" | Songwriter, producer | |
| 2026 | BTS | ARIRANG | "Swim" | Songwriter, producer | |
| 2026 | BTS | ARIRANG | "Please" | Songwriter, producer | |
| 2026 | Jennie | Fallen Angel | "Heaven" | Songwriter, producer | |
| 2026 | Jennie | Fallen Angel | "Less Than a Lover" | Songwriter, producer | |
| 2026 | Karol G | No Me Arrepiento de Sentir Tanto | "Final feliz" | Songwriter, producer | |
| 2026 | Dove Cameron | Final Girl | "Good on You" | Songwriter, producer | |
| 2026 | Dove Cameron | Final Girl | "Immortalized" | Songwriter, producer | |
| 2026 | Dove Cameron | Final Girl | "Maybe Heaven Is a Jazz Club" | Songwriter, producer | |

== Selected awards and nominations ==
| Year | Organization | Award | Project | Result | Ref. |
|---|---|---|---|---|---|
| 2019 | GMA Dove Awards | Rock/Contemporary Album of the Year | Switchfoot – Native Tongue | Won | |
| 2023 | BRIT Awards | International Song of the Year | OneRepublic – "I Ain't Worried" | Nominated | |
| 2025 | Juno Awards | Single of the Year | Tate McRae – "exes" | Won | |
| 2025 | Juno Awards | Album of the Year | Tate McRae – Think Later | Won | |
| 2025 | Juno Awards | Pop Album of the Year | Tate McRae – Think Later | Won | |
| 2025 | Latin Grammy Awards | Song of the Year | Bad Bunny – "DtMF" | Nominated | |
| 2025 | Latin Grammy Awards | Album of the Year | Bad Bunny – Debí Tirar Más Fotos | Nominated | |
| 2025 | Latin Grammy Awards | Urban Song of the Year | Bad Bunny – "DtMF" | Won | |
| 2026 | Grammy Awards | Record of the Year | Bad Bunny – "DtMF" | Nominated | |
| 2026 | Grammy Awards | Song of the Year | Bad Bunny – "DtMF" | Nominated | |
| 2026 | Grammy Awards | Album of the Year | Bad Bunny – Debí Tirar Más Fotos | Won | |
| 2026 | Grammy Awards | Best Dance Pop Recording | Tate McRae – "Just Keep Watching" | Nominated | |
