= Almost Waking =

Studio album by Bill Orcutt and Mabe Fratti
- Released: May 22, 2026
- Studio: Tinho Studios, Mexico City; the Living Room, San Francisco
- Genre: Experimental
- Length: 30:25
- Label: Unheard of Hope

Almost Waking is a collaborative album by the American guitarist Bill Orcutt and the Guatemalan cellist and vocalist Mabe Fratti. It was released on May 22, 2026, through Unheard of Hope. The album was developed through remote file exchange after Fratti publicly praised Orcutt's music, and its eight tracks pair Orcutt's guitar with Fratti's cello and occasional vocals.

Almost Waking received positive reviews from critics, who described it as an intimate collaboration built around the contrast between Orcutt's guitar style and Fratti's melodic cello and vocal arrangements. It received universal acclaim according to Metacritic, and appeared on midyear best-albums lists by the Guardian, Slant Magazine, and Treble.

== Background and recording ==
Almost Waking originated after Fratti discussed Orcutt's 2017 self-titled solo album in a 2024 Baker's Dozen feature for the Quietus, where she said that "O Platitudes!" was the first Orcutt track she heard and connected his guitar playing to melody, blues, and his past in Harry Pussy. The public mention prompted Orcutt to contact her about a possible collaboration. Fratti said that the work began from solo guitar material sent by Orcutt, which she and her Titanic bandmate I. La Católica developed in Mexico City by finding harmonic and melodic responses to the guitar parts. Orcutt described the recording process as nearly a year of trading files remotely.

The album was recorded at Tinho Studios in Mexico City and at the Living Room in San Francisco. It was mixed by Santiago Parra and mastered by James Plotkin. Fratti plays cello and sings on the album, while Orcutt plays guitar. Bandcamp credits I. La Católica with cello arrangement contributions on "Almost Waking", "Forced & Forced & Forced", "Arise from Graves and Aspire", and "Steps of the Sun". Unheard of Hope's website republished Fratti's account of the collaboration, in which she described developing melodies from Orcutt's guitar material while leaving space in the arrangements.

== Music ==
Almost Waking contains eight tracks, six of which are instrumental. Pitchfork listed the album's genre as experimental and described it as a relaxed collaboration that drew on British folk and Pacific Northwest indie rock references. The publication's Jayson Greene wrote that the record's loose organizing idea was a sense of movement, and he noted that Fratti sometimes made her cello resemble an electric guitar or a stand-up bass.

Writing for the Guardian, Alastair Shuttleworth described the album as a set of conversations between Fratti's cello and Orcutt's guitar, with both instruments moving between melodic, abrasive, and voice-like roles. He identified "El Inicio es cuestión de suerte" and "Todo puede ser error" as the two songs featuring Fratti's vocals and discussed them as moments where Orcutt's playing is placed in a less severe setting. In the Line of Best Fit, Janne Oinonen wrote that Fratti's parts were not used to smooth over Orcutt's harsher guitar approach, but to build a melodic counterweight around it.

Jeff Terich of Treble described the album as "chamber folk" and wrote that it balances Fratti's voice and cello with Orcutt's guitar figures rather than placing either musician in a supporting role. Madison Bloom of Paste wrote that the record's remote construction still gives the impression of the two players reacting to each other in real time. No Ripcord described the album as a varied collaboration that moves between Fratti's vocal pieces and more dissonant instrumental passages.

== Release ==
Orcutt and Fratti announced Almost Waking on March 12, 2026, alongside the release of the title track and "El Inicio es cuestión de suerte". The album was released on May 22, 2026, through Unheard of Hope. Its Bandcamp page listed digital, vinyl, and CD formats and a 24-bit/48kHz download.

== Critical reception ==
Professional ratings
Aggregate scores
Source	Rating
Metacritic	82/100
Review scores
Source	Rating
The Guardian	4/5 stars
The Line of Best Fit	7/10
Paste	B
Pitchfork	7.7/10

Almost Waking received positive reviews from music critics. At Metacritic, the album has a score of 82 out of 100 based on nine critic reviews, indicating "universal acclaim".

Jayson Greene reviewed the album for Pitchfork and characterized it as unusually open and warm within both artists' catalogues, emphasizing the blend of Orcutt's guitar and Fratti's cello and vocals. Alastair Shuttleworth, in the Guardian, wrote that the album revealed an unexpectedly strong meeting point between the two musicians' approaches and gave particular attention to the conversational instrumental passages. Janne Oinonen gave the album a score of 7 out of 10 for the Line of Best Fit, calling it a satisfying collaboration that drew out strengths from both artists.

Jacob Manieson of the Quietus wrote that the album's short runtime worked in its favor, presenting a focused record built from guitar, cello, and Fratti's voice. Reviewing the album for Post-Trash, Khagan Aslanov wrote that the remote recording process still produced a cohesive record, and he singled out "Forced & Forced & Forced", "Steps of the Sun", "El Inicio es cuestión de suerte", and "Todo puede ser error" as examples of the duo's range. No Ripcord framed the album as a cross-cultural and intergenerational collaboration, while Jeff Terich wrote in Treble that it sounded like a complete exchange between the collaborators. Madison Bloom wrote in Paste that the album's textures were precise rather than accidental.

== Accolades ==
Accolades for Almost Waking
Publication	List	Year	Rank
The Guardian	The best albums of 2026 so far	2026	Unranked
Slant Magazine	The Best Albums of 2026 ... So Far	2026	Unranked
Treble	The Best Albums of 2026 So Far	2026	Unranked

== Track listing ==
Credits and track lengths are adapted from Bandcamp.

Almost Waking track listing
No.	Title	Length
1.	"Almost Waking" (cello arrangement with I. La Católica)	3:44
2.	"El Inicio es cuestión de suerte"	3:45
3.	"Forced & Forced & Forced" (cello arrangement with I. La Católica)	4:04
4.	"Arise from Graves and Aspire" (cello arrangement with I. La Católica)	3:29
5.	"The Heaven of our Misery"	4:07
6.	"Steps of the Sun" (cello arrangement with I. La Católica)	3:52
7.	"Todo puede ser error"	3:49
8.	"A Rural Pen"	3:35
Total length:		30:25

== Personnel ==
Credits are adapted from Bandcamp.

- Bill Orcutt – guitar
- Mabe Fratti – cello, vocals
- I. La Católica – cello arrangement contributions (tracks 1, 3, 4, and 6)
- Santiago Parra – mixing
- James Plotkin – mastering
