= Alchemical: Volume 1 =

2023 EP by Dove Cameron

EP by Dove Cameron
- Released: December 1, 2023
- Recorded: 2021–2023
- Genres: Pop; alt-pop; goth-pop
- Length: 22:45
- Labels: Disruptor; Columbia
- Producers: Connor McDonough; Riley McDonough; Ryan Daly; Evan Blair; Isaiah Tejada; The Monsters & Strangerz

Dove Cameron chronology
Liv and Maddie (2015)	Alchemical: Volume 1 (2023)	Final Girl (2026)

Singles from Alchemical: Volume 1
- 1. "Boyfriend" Released: February 11, 2022; 2. "Breakfast" Released: June 24, 2022; 3. "Lethal Woman" Released: October 20, 2023; 4. "Sand" Released: November 10, 2023

Alchemical: Volume 1 is the debut extended play (Note: Though Alchemical: Volume 1 was initially promoted as the first volume of her debut studio album, the full two-part project was scrapped. In an interview with Nylon, Cameron confirmed that her upcoming project will be her first full-length album.) by American singer and actress Dove Cameron, released on December 1, 2023, through Disruptor Records and Columbia Records. The EP is primarily a pop and alt-pop record, with lyrical content centered around love, grief and self-reflection.

The lead single from the project, "Boyfriend" gained viral attention on the video-sharing app TikTok, received critical acclaim, and reached the top-20 on the US Billboard Hot 100. Three further singles preceded Alchemical: Volume 1: "Breakfast", "Lethal Woman" and "Sand". Upon its release, the EP received generally positive reviews with praise towards the songwriting and Cameron's vocals.

== Background and release ==
After various single releases, Cameron announced in 2022 that she had begun work on a new EP and released the single "Boyfriend" which went viral on TikTok and reached top-ten in various countries. After its release, Cameron reset her public music catalog, removing her older releases from all streaming services.

On January 6, 2023, Cameron posted a screenshot for a 14-song listing under the title Celestial Body on her Twitter account. Three titles present on the image included "Evil Woman", "Kate Moss", and "Boys/Girls." On July 24, 2023, Cameron told Variety that she was really close to finishing the record, and had written up to 60 songs for it.

She noted on September 2, 2023, that she had decided to release a two-part album, and later revealed the title as Alchemical: Volume 1. Cameron noted that she "felt like [she] was writing the two halves in such different headspaces" calling it a "stark sonic page turn". Alchemical: Volume 1 was released on December 1, 2023.

== Composition ==
=== Genres and themes ===
While the Emmy-winning star has been a household name [...] behind the scenes of Cameron's success story, she's faced hardships that've forcibly kept her in touch with life's harsh realities [...] Cameron, who's seen a therapist for most of her life, approached writing Alchemical, Vol. 1 by revisiting many harrowing experiences she's endured.

— People writer Jack Irvin on Cameron's approach to writing the album.

Alchemical: Volume 1 is primarily a pop, alt-pop, and goth-pop record. Cameron had initially intended for the lyrical content to be character-driven, told from the points of views of villains. However, over time, the EP's lyrical content became much more personal and became centered around love, breakups, self-reflection and grief and was described as a "looking glass into [Cameron's] intricate and impressively balanced. The EP also incorporates a mix of ballads, orchestral elements and electronic dance music breakdowns. Washington Square News writer Eleanor Jacobs noted that the production team "utilizes deconstruction and are unafraid of mess as a means toward reflecting Cameron's honesty".

Cameron has stated that she was mostly inspired by her mother and American poet Jack Gilbert, adding that she loves to read poetry that "feels so human that [she's] reminded that we are eternal because all of these experiences are so varied and so many that it's actually universal".

=== Music and lyrics ===
The EP opens with the song "Lethal Woman". The song was described as a "dramatic opening statement" and Cameron's vocals were compared to that of a Disney villain. The song lyrically centers around a woman Cameron met at a party who exuded "confidence, sensuality and danger". This is followed by the somber ballad, "Still", which received a comparison to Mykola Leontovych's, "Carol of the Bells". Michael Cragg noted that Cameron's "sultry voice adds a sinister dimension".

"Breakfast" was described as a "vulnerable track infused with rage". Cameron noted that it "emerged from vulnerable conversations in the studio" and based it on an experience she had where there was "a power imbalance dynamic in a relationship with a straight man". She added that while writing the song, she dived "into radical honesty to keep conversations going that were previously silenced, such as highlighting the LGBTQ+ community and other marginalized groups".

This was followed by "Sand" which was called the EP's highlight and spoke on a toxic and unrequited relationship, "capturing the complexity of navigating a relationship where love is imbalanced". The song's songwriting received praise, being called "poetic and impactful". Cameron originally wrote the song as a poem. "White Glove" was called "camp-pop" and centers around living a luxury life with "sex, money and drugs". The song was compared to the opening track's darkness. "God's Game" was described as haunting where Cameron sings about the "unpredictability of love" and vulnerability, noting that "[she] is no home for [someone]". In the song, Cameron reflects on her career.

"Boyfriend" was hailed as a queer anthem. The song "prowls around with a seductive swagger amid volcanic beat eruptions". The EP concludes with "Fragile Things" which was called ethereal and serene, with Cameron drawing parallels "between her doomed romantic relationship and a house of fragile things". Cameron uses her low, sultry vocals on the finale, and is accompanied by a slow, high-pitched piano before building up to incorporate strings in a staccato manner. The song was compared to a pensive waltz that likens an old relationship to a dilapidated house.

== Critical reception ==
Professional ratings
Review scores
Source	Rating
Dork	4/5 stars
The Guardian	3/5 stars

Upon release, the EP received generally positive reviews. Dork writer Martyn Young called the EP "short, sharp and direct". He called Cameron a rising star, noting that the EP "leaves you tantalisingly, and wanting more from an artist on the precipice of pop glory". Washington Square News writer Eleanor Jacobs also praised the EP's songwriting although she noted some criticism for the tracklist, feeling that "the emotional arrangement feels too intentional to create any ongoing narrative within the tracklist, but is perhaps meant to establish a divide between the artist's past and present". She called the EP "rife with reminiscence as well as a longing for healing and conclusion".

The Statesman writer Clare Gehlich gave the EP high praise and felt it was "a culmination of Cameron writing music to process and express the trauma tied to her past relationships with moments of self-discovery". The Guardian writer Michael Cragg gave the EP three stars, and compared Cameron to Billie Eilish and Lana Del Rey. Contrastingly, another writer for the same newspaper felt the EP fell flat, calling it a "failed experiment". He called Cameron a "black sheep" amongst Disney-turned-popstars Olivia Rodrigo and Sabrina Carpenter, critiquing the EP's production.

== Promotion ==
Cameron had stated that she would embark on a tour in 2024, even though she ended up not doing any tour.

=== Singles ===
"Boyfriend" was released as the lead single on February 11, 2022. The song became a commercial success and reached 16 on the Billboard Hot 100 chart becoming Cameron's first entry since 2015. It was certified double platinum by the Recording Industry Association of America (RIAA) in June 2024. A music video was released simultaneously and has since surpassed over 90 million views.

The EP's second single, "Breakfast", followed in June 2022 with an accompanying music video in response to the overturning of Roe v. Wade. The video went on to win Video for Good at the 2023 MTV Video Music Awards.

On October 20, 2023, the promotional single "Lethal Woman" was made available alongside the EP's pre-order. "Sand" was released as the second promotional single from the EP, accompanied with a music video featuring Josh Beauchamp.

Concerts

On November 15, 2023, Cameron announced two concerts in New York City and Los Angeles billed as "The Alchemical Pop-Up Events". The New York City concert took place December 4 at The Sultan Room, and the Los Angeles concert took place on December 6 at The Masonic Lodge at Hollywood Forever.

== Commercial performance ==
Alchemical: Volume 1 debuted at 41 on the UK Album Downloads Chart and number 6 on the US Billboard Heatseekers chart.

== Track listing ==
Alchemical: Volume 1 track listing
No.	Title	Writer(s)	Producer(s)	Length
1.	"Lethal Woman"	Dove Cameron; Connor McDonough; Riley McDonough; Ryan Daly	Connor; Riley; Daly	2:06
2.	"Still"	Cameron; Connor; Riley; Daly	Connor; Riley; Daly	3:09
3.	"Breakfast"	Cameron; Delacey; Evan Blair; Jesse Fink	Evan Blair	2:28
4.	"Sand"	Cameron; Taylor Upsahl; Isaiah Tejada; Jordan K. Johnson; Michael Pollack; Stefan Johnson	Tejada; The Monsters & Strangerz; S. Johnson^{[v]}	3:39
5.	"White Glove"	Cameron; Connor; Riley; Daly	Connor; Riley; Daly	2:30
6.	"God's Game"	Cameron; Madison Love; Connor; Riley; Daly	Connor; Riley; Daly	2:44
7.	"Boyfriend"	Cameron; Delacey; Skyler Stonestreet; Blair	Blair	2:33
8.	"Fragile Things"	Cameron; Connor; Riley; Daly	Connor; Riley; Daly	3:33
Total length:				22:45

Notes

- ^{^[v]} signifies a vocal producer.

== Personnel ==
Musicians

- Dove Cameron – lead vocals (all tracks), background vocals (track 4)
- Ryan Daly – background vocals (track 1)
- Connor McDonough – background vocals (track 1)
- Riley McDonough – background vocals (track 1)
- Toby McDonough – background vocals (track 1)
- Allie Stamler – violin (tracks 2, 8)
- Jordan K. Johnson – drums, keyboards, programming (track 4)
- Stefan Johnson – drums, keyboards, programming (track 4)
- Michael Pollack – keyboards (track 4)
- Isaiah Tejada – programming (track 4)
- Evan Blair – background vocals, bass, drums, guitar, piano (track 7)

Technical

- Dale Becker – mastering (tracks 1, 2, 4–6)
- Eric Lagg – mastering (track 7)
- Rich Costey – mixing (tracks 1, 2, 4–6)
- Alex Ghenea – mixing (track 3)
- Evan Blair – engineering (tracks 3, 7)
- Stefan Johnson – engineering (track 4)
- Jeff Citron – engineering assistance (tracks 1, 2, 4–6, 8)
- Brady Wortzel – engineering assistance (track 4)

== Charts ==
Chart performance for Alchemical: Volume 1
Chart (2023—2024)	Peak position
UK Album Downloads Chart	41
US Heatseekers Albums (Billboard)	6

== Release history ==
Region	Date	Format	Label	Ref.
Various	December 1, 2023	Digital download; streaming	Disruptor; Columbia	
