= French Girls =

2025 single by Dove Cameron

Single by Dove Cameron
- Released: May 2, 2025
- Recorded: 2024
- Genre: Electropop
- Length: 2:52
- Label: Disruptor; Columbia
- Songwriters: Dove Cameron; Madison Love; Tyler Spry; Victoria Zaro
- Producers: Harry Charles; Tyler Spry

Dove Cameron singles chronology
"Too Much" (2025)	"French Girls" (2025)	"Romeo" (2025)

Visualizer
- "French Girls" on YouTube

"French Girls" is a song recorded by American singer and songwriter Dove Cameron, released by Disruptor and Columbia Records on May 2, 2025. Cameron wrote the song alongside Madison Love, Tyler Spry and Victoria Zaro; Spry and Harry Charles handled the production.

The chorus of "French Girls" references the 1997 film Titanic and was partly inspired by Cameron's adoration for Paris and Parisian museums. Cameron felt that the message of the song would be deemed superficial, but explained that the lyrics explore women that sacrifice parts of themselves to become a muse for somebody. While she admitted the lyrics were "intricate", she confirmed that she was in a "high-energy, joy-filled space" when writing the song.

== Background ==
In April 2025, Cameron headlined "Everything Must Go", an online, live gig where viewers could buy memorabilia from her life and career. The livestream was to raise funds for the National Alliance on Mental Illness (NAMI). The setlist for the gig included "French Girls", marking it as both the first time fans had heard the song, as well as the first time Cameron had performed it.

== Composition and release ==
Following the song's first live performance, Cameron announced that "French Girls" would be released on May 2, 2025. The chorus, a line of which is "paint me like one of your French girls", references the 1997 film Titanic, quoting an infamous line said by Rose DeWitt Bukater (Kate Winslet). It was also inspired by Cameron's adoration for Paris and Parisian museums. Music publications described "French Girls" as an electropop song.

Cameron felt that people would view the message of the song as superficial, but clarified a deeper meaning. She stated: "There's a huge intersection between pain, heartbreak, joy and camp and levity. And that's where we found ourselves in 'French Girls.' The melodrama of being a muse for a sculptor or a painter. There's something so painfully romantic and also constricting about that." Cameron has also stated that she is not strictly singing from her own experiences in "French Girls". She said: "I'm talking about all of the women in the industry that are considered these great, larger-than-life personalities, these Helen of Troy people that we remember in history as these icons of beauty and art who can also be the most tragic figures." She also wanted to highlight the "self-sacrificing mania about being a muse that is not healthy". Cameron added that although the lyrics are "intricate", she was in a "high-energy, joy-filled space" when writing the song.

Although initially marketed as a single from her debut album, it was later omitted from the final track listing upon the release of Final Girl (2026). Cameron later stated that she did not resonate with the song when she was assembling the track listing for the album, feeling that it was not confessional enough for the body of work.

== Credits and personnel ==
Credits adapted from Spotify.

- Dove Cameron – vocals, songwriting
- Harry Charles – production, keyboard, percussion, programming
- Madison Love – songwriting
- Tyler Spry – songwriting, production, recording engineer, backing vocals, bass, keyboards, percussion, programming
- Victoria Zaro – songwriting
- Joe Henderson – assistant engineering, editor, vocal production
- Roger Joseph Manning, Jr. – keyboard
- Matt Chamberlain – drums
- Tom Norris – mixing engineer

== Release history ==
Region	Date	Format	Label	Ref.
Various	May 2, 2025	Digital download; streaming	Disruptor; Columbia	

== Charts ==
Chart performance for "French Girls"
Chart (2025)	Peak position
Czech Republic Airplay (ČNS IFPI)	44
Latvia Airplay (LaIPA)	18
