= Todos los días todo el día =

Studio album by Latin Mafia
- Released: October 24, 2024
- Recorded: 2022–2024
- Genre: Latin
- Length: 31:05
- Label: Rimas Entertainment
- Producer: Miguel Ángel de la Rosa

Singles from Todos los días todo el día
- 1. "Siento que merezco más" Released: October 24, 2024

Todos los días todo el día (stylized in all caps) is the debut studio album by Mexican band Latin Mafia, released on October 24, 2024. The song "Siento que merezco más" was the only single released from the album, and has a remixed single through A Colors Show. Every song on the album has a music visualizer video. The band released a music video for the single directed by Skillz.

== Critical reception ==
Todos los días todo el día received positive reviews from music critics. Verys Davies from the Los Angeles Times praised the band's ability to include diverse musical elements within single tracks, stating, "from the piano-backed trapbeat on 'Nunca he sido honesto' to the sudden rumbling synth on 'Vivo si me exiges' and the peaceful harmonies on 'Me estoy cayendo', the record succeeds in following Latin Mafia's unpredictable formula of stark switch-ups and evocative lyricism."

=== Accolades ===
Todos los días todo el día won Best Pop Latin Fusion Song at the 37th Premio Lo Nuestro awards for "Siento que merezco más".

Select rankings of Todos los dias todo el dia
Publication	List	Rank	Ref.
Billboard	The Best Latin Albums of 2024	11	
Rolling Stone	The Best Latin Albums of 2024	3	

== Track listing ==
All tracks are written by Emilio de la Rosa Marroquín, Miguel Ángel de la Rosa Marroquín, and Milton de la Rosa Marroquín.

No.	Title	Length
1.	"Siento que merezco más"	2:45
2.	"Y como te digo que"	2:40
3.	"Nunca he sido honesto."	2:56
4.	"Me estoy cayendo"	2:51
5.	"Sentado aquí,"	2:42
6.	"Vivo si me exiges"	3:06
7.	"Pero me estoy acabando."	2:46
8.	"Qué vamos a hacer?"	2:12
9.	"Yo siempre contesto."	3:19
10.	"Ven,"	2:27
11.	"Tengo mucho ruido."	3:21
Total length:		31:05

== Personnel ==
- Emilio de la Rosa – vocals
- Milton de la Rosa – vocals
- Miguel de la Rosa – producer
