= MTV Video Music Award for Video for Good =

Annual music video award

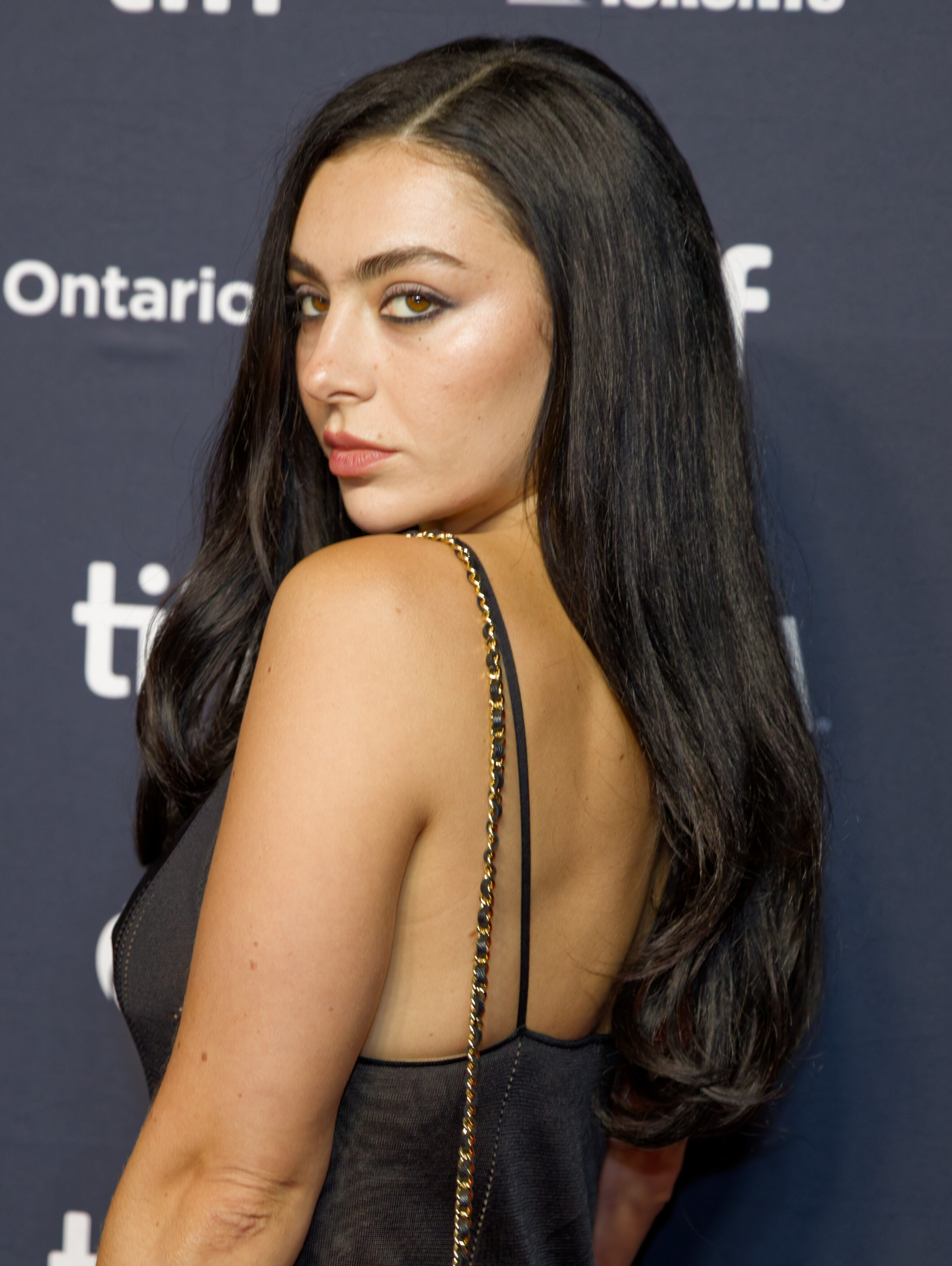
- "Guess" by Charli XCX featuring Billie Eilish is the most recent recipient.
- Awarded for: Music videos with social statements
- Country: United States
- Presented by: MTV
- First award: 2011
- Currently held by: Charli XCX featuring Billie Eilish – "Guess" (2025)

Highlights
- Most wins: Billie Eilish (3)
- Most nominations: Billie Eilish; Demi Lovato; (4 each)
- Website: VMA website

The MTV Video Music Award for Video for Good is an award handed out at the yearly MTV Video Music Awards, first introduced at the 2011 ceremony. Originally named Best Video with a Message, the word "Social" was added to its name in 2013.

For the 2017 ceremony, the award was renamed Best Fight Against the System while still being known for awarding videos that address current social and political subjects. In 2018, the award's name became Video with a Message, and in 2019, it was changed to its current title.

The inaugural winner of the category was Lady Gaga. As of 2025, Billie Eilish is the biggest winner with three awards, followed by John Legend and Big Sean with two each. Eilish and Demi Lovato are also the most nominated artists, with four nominations each.

== Recipients ==
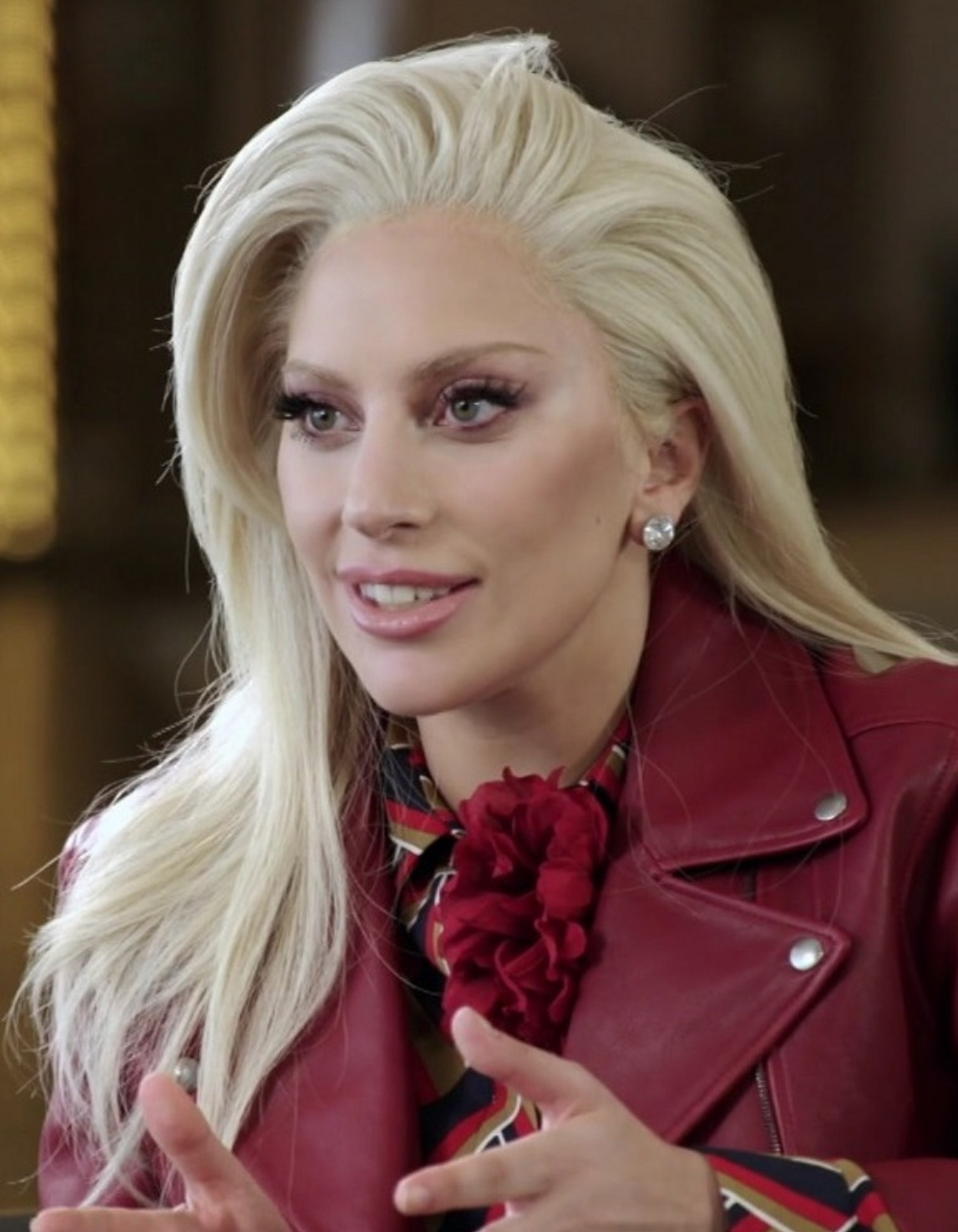
Inaugural winner Lady Gaga.

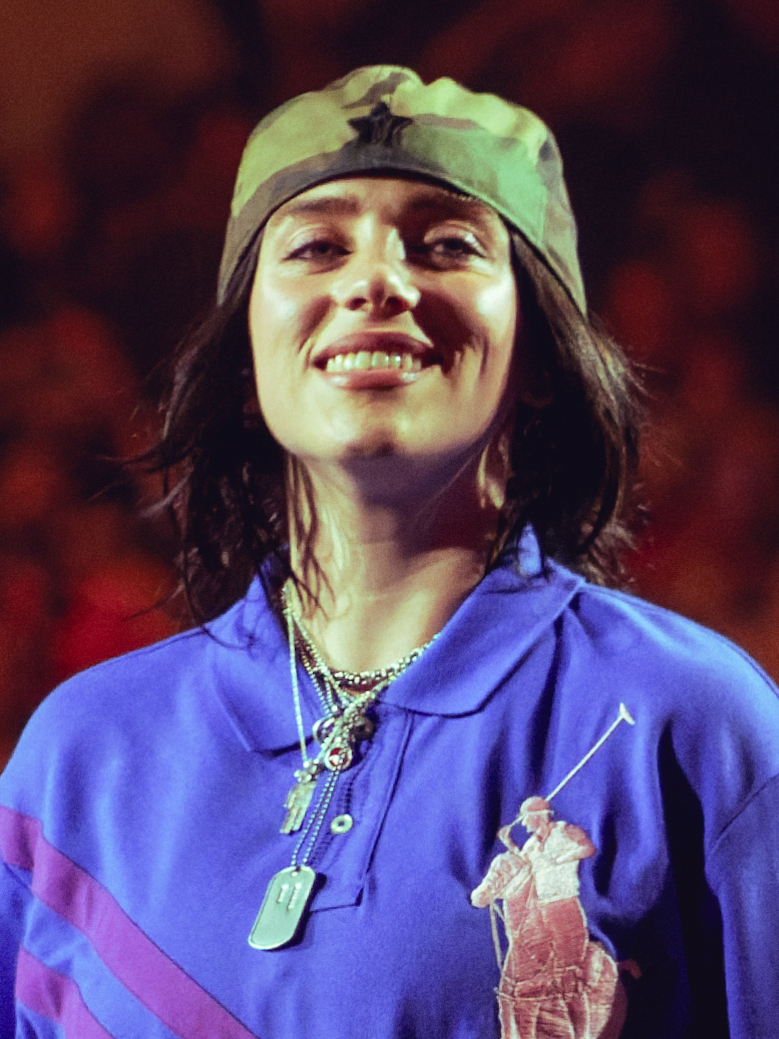
Billie Eilish is the biggest winner with three. She won in 2021 with "Your Power", 2024 with "What Was I Made For?" and 2025 with "Guess featuring billie eilish"

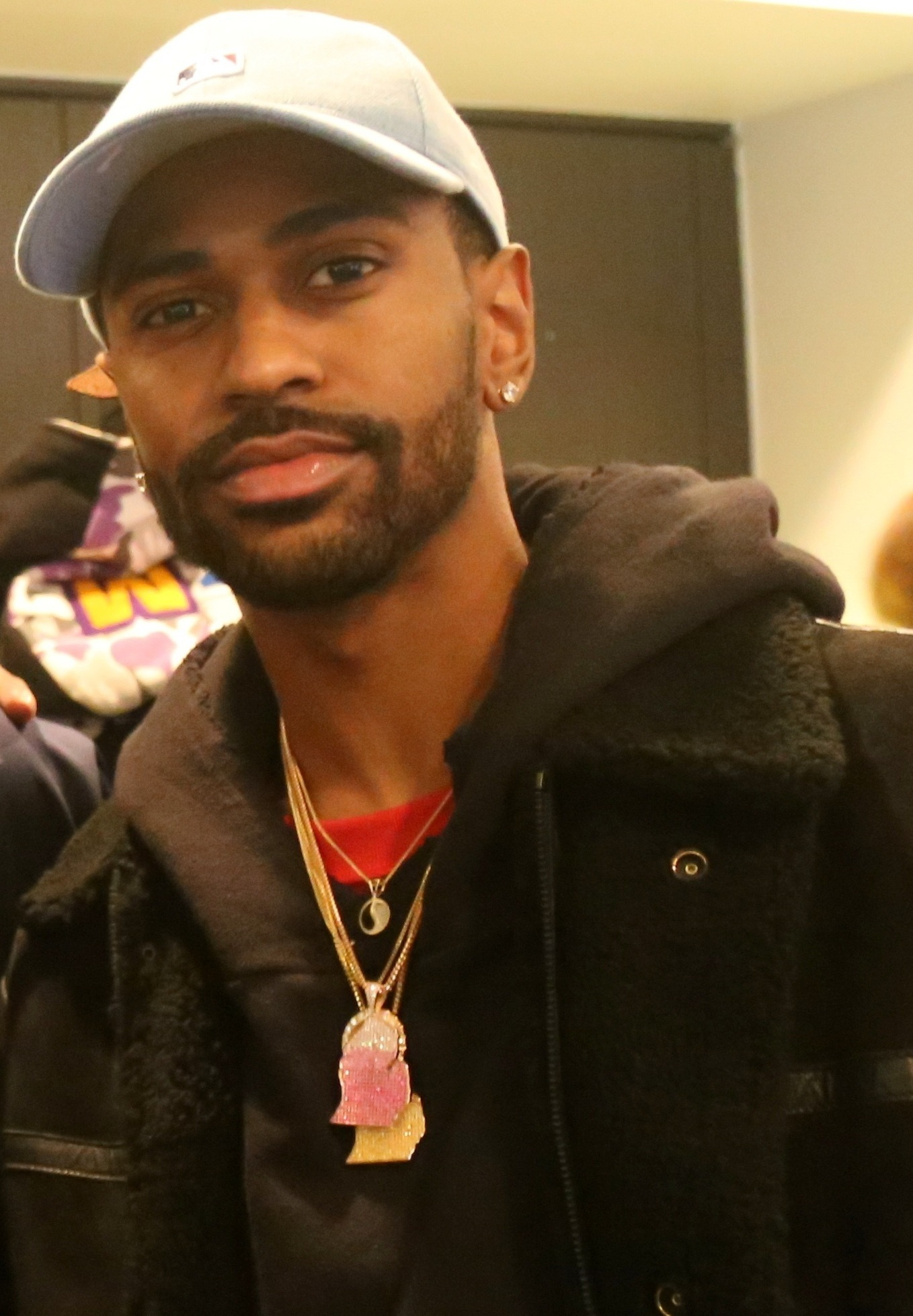
Two-time winner Big Sean.

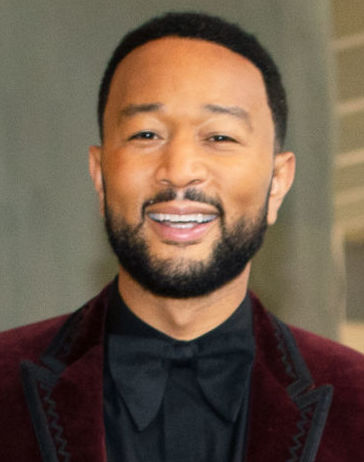
Two-time winner John Legend.

=== 2010s ===
Recipients
Year (Note: Each year is linked to the article about the MTV Video Music Awards held that year.)	Winner(s)	Video	Nominees	Ref.
2011	Lady Gaga	"Born This Way"	Eminem (featuring Rihanna) — "Love The Way You Lie"; Katy Perry — "Firework"; P!nk — "Fuckin' Perfect"; Rise Against — "Make It Stop (September's Children)"; Taylor Swift — "Mean"	
2012	Demi Lovato	"Skyscraper"	Kelly Clarkson — "Dark Side"; Gym Class Heroes (featuring Ryan Tedder) — "The Fighter"; K'naan (featuring Nelly Furtado) — "Is Anybody Out There?"; Lil Wayne — "How to Love"; Rise Against — "Ballad of Hollis Brown"	
2013	Macklemore and Ryan Lewis (featuring Mary Lambert)	"Same Love"	Beyoncé — "I Was Here"; Kelly Clarkson — "People Like Us"; Miguel — "Candles in the Sun"; Snoop Lion (featuring Drake and Cori B.) — "No Guns Allowed"	
2014	Beyoncé	"Pretty Hurts"	Avicii — "Hey Brother"; J. Cole (featuring TLC) — "Crooked Smile"; David Guetta (featuring Mikky Ekko) — "One Voice"; Angel Haze (featuring Sia) — "Battle Cry"; Kelly Rowland — "Dirty Laundry"	
2015	Big Sean (featuring Kanye West and John Legend)	"One Man Can Change the World"	Colbie Caillat — "Try"; Jennifer Hudson — "I Still Love You"; Rihanna — "American Oxygen"; Wale — "The White Shoes"	
2016	—N/a			
2017	Big Sean — "Light"; Alessia Cara — "Scars to Your Beautiful"; The Hamilton Mixtape (K'naan, Snow Tha Product, Riz MC, & Residente) – "Immigrants (We Get the Job Done)"; John Legend — "Surefire"; Logic (featuring Damian Lemar Hudson) – "Black Spiderman"; Taboo (featuring Shailene Woodley) – "Stand Up / Stand N Rock #NoDAPL"			
2018	Childish Gambino	"This is America"	Drake – "God's Plan"; Dej Loaf and Leon Bridges – "Liberated"; Logic (featuring Alessia Cara and Khalid) – "1-800-273-8255"; Janelle Monáe (featuring Grimes) – "Pynk"; Jessie Reyez – "Gatekeeper"	
2019	Taylor Swift	"You Need to Calm Down"	Jamie N Commons and Skylar Grey (featuring Gallant) – "Runaway Train"; Halsey – "Nightmare"; The Killers – "Land of the Free"; John Legend – "Preach"; Lil Dicky – "Earth"	

=== 2020s ===
Recipients
Year (Note: Each year is linked to the article about the MTV Video Music Awards held that year.)	Winner(s)	Video	Nominees	Ref.
2020	H.E.R.	"I Can't Breathe"	Billie Eilish – "All the Good Girls Go to Hell"; Lil Baby – "The Bigger Picture"; Demi Lovato – "I Love Me"; Anderson .Paak – "Lockdown"; Taylor Swift – "The Man"	
2021	Billie Eilish	"Your Power"	Kane Brown – "Worldwide Beautiful"; H.E.R. – "Fight for You"; Lil Nas X – "Montero (Call Me by Your Name)"; Demi Lovato – "Dancing with the Devil"; Pharrell Williams (featuring Jay-Z) – "Entrepreneur"	
2022	Lizzo	"About Damn Time"	Kendrick Lamar – "The Heart Part 5"; Latto – "Pussy"; Rina Sawayama – "This Hell"; Stromae – "Fils de joie"	
2023	Dove Cameron	"Breakfast"	Bad Bunny – "El Apagón – Aquí Vive Gente"; Imagine Dragons – "Crushed"; Alicia Keys – "If I Ain't Got You (Orchestral)"; Demi Lovato – "Swine"; Maluma – "La Reina"	
2024	Billie Eilish	"What Was I Made For? (From The Motion Picture Barbie)"	Tyler Childers – "In Your Love"; Coldplay – "Feelslikeimfallinginlove"; Joyner Lucas and Jelly Roll – "Best for Me"; Raye – "Genesis"; Alexander Stewart – "If You Only Knew"	
2025	Charli XCX (featuring Billie Eilish)	"Guess"	Burna Boy – "Higher"; Doechii – "Anxiety"; Eminem (featuring Jelly Roll) – "Somebody Save Me"; Selena Gomez and Benny Blanco – "Younger and Hotter Than Me"; Zach Hood (featuring Sasha Alex Sloan) – "Sleepwalking"	

== Statistics ==
=== Artists with multiple wins ===
3 wins

- Billie Eilish

2 wins

- Big Sean
- John Legend

=== Artists with multiple nominations ===
4 nominations

- Billie Eilish
- Demi Lovato

3 nominations

- John Legend
- Taylor Swift
- Alessia Cara

2 nominations

- Beyoncé
- Big Sean
- Drake
- Eminem
- H.E.R.
- Jelly Roll
- Kelly Clarkson
- Logic
- Rihanna
