= Breakfast (Dove Cameron song) =

2022 single by Dove Cameron

- Updated digital artwork

Single by Dove Cameron

from the album Alchemical: Volume 1
- Released: June 24, 2022
- Genre: Alternative pop
- Length: 2:28
- Label: Disruptor; Columbia
- Songwriters: Dove Cameron; Delacey; Evan Blair; Jesse Finkelstein
- Producer: Evan Blair

Dove Cameron singles chronology
"Boyfriend" (2022)	"Breakfast" (2022)	"Bad Idea" (2022)

Music video
- "Breakfast" on YouTube

"Breakfast" is a song by the American singer and actress Dove Cameron. She wrote it along with Delacey, Jesse Finkelstein, and its producer, Evan Blair. The song was released through Disruptor and Columbia Records on June 24, 2022, as the second single from her debut EP, Alchemical: Volume 1 (2023). It also served as the follow-up to her previous single "Boyfriend" (2022). "Breakfast" is an alternative pop track dubbed as a queer song about an egocentric ex.

Lauren Denn directed the music video for "Breakfast", which premiered on August 23, 2022. Although it had a different original music video filmed, a new video was produced following the Supreme Court of the United States' decision to overturn Roe v. Wade. The video stars Cameron as a business executive and depicts an alternative world where the traditional gender roles are reversed. The singer performed "Breakfast" at the 2022 MTV Video Music Awards, where it won in the category Video for Good.

== Background and release ==
After coming out as queer in 2020, Dove Cameron released the single "Boyfriend" in 2022, which went viral on the video-sharing app TikTok. Her previous solo songs were removed from streaming services because she believed it was her "trying to find [her] sound" and did not represent herself. The lyrics of the single represent her desire of stealing a girl from her boyfriend. Cameron stated that she felt "incredibly disempowered as a young woman" at the time, and was inspired to express her feelings about the gender dynamics in society.

Cameron returned to the studio and started working on her follow-up single. It was initially made as a poem that included the last line, "I floss my teeth with men like you." She changed the original lyric to "I eat boys like you for breakfast", and felt that it matched the "villain-who-is-the-main-character" theme of her music. "Breakfast" was released on June 24, 2022, as the second single from her then-upcoming debut studio album, Alchemical: Volume 1 (2023). Cameron performed "Breakfast" at the 2022 MTV Video Music Awards pre-show, alongside "Boyfriend".

== Composition ==
Cameron wrote "Breakfast" alongside Delacey, Jesse Finkelstein and Evan Blair, while the latter was the producer and recording engineer. Alex Ghenea served as the mixing engineer. With a duration of two minutes and twenty-eight seconds, music critics identified "Breakfast" as an alternative pop track. Cameron was inspired to write the song by an egocentric ex who was "constantly speaking down" to her. She described it as a queer song, which does not equal to "I hate men and I only date women", but it means that she can confront a certain man. Jason Lipshutz of Billboard said that the song contains a "harder" production than "Boyfriend".

== Reception ==
"Breakfast" appeared at number 27 on the New Zealand Hot Singles chart issued for July 7, 2022. Lipshutz named it one of the best new pop singles of its release week. The critic praised the song's "drama" and Cameron's vocal performance, which includes "a smokiness and not-too-subtle hint of danger", and compared it positively to other contemporary artists of the genre. Upon the album's release, music critics included it in their reviews. Dork's Martyn Young said that the song "rides in on its fevered groove" and described its main line as "iconic". In a review for The Guardian, Shaad D'Souza believed that the song's hook was "shamelessly" inspired by "Diet Mountain Dew" (2012) by the American singer-songwriter Lana Del Rey.

== Music video ==
The music video for "Breakfast", directed by Lauren Dunn, premiered on August 23, 2022. Before its release, Cameron had a different concept in mind for the single's music video, which was already recorded and she described as "beautiful" and "campier". Following the Supreme Court of the United States' decision to overturn Roe v. Wade, she felt empowered to reimagine it as a statement about the gender roles in society. Inspired by Mad Men and The Stepford Wives, the video depicts an alternative world in which the gender roles are reversed. It stars Cameron as a business executive, wearing an oversized shirt, blazer, and tie in a 1970s-inspired set design. In a statement, Cameron said: "I want the audience to notice how strange it is to watch the roles be reversed and it was important to highlight how ingrained these roles really are in our nervous systems."

A television reporter informing about the impact of Roe v. Wade in men is presented at the beginning of the video. Cameron appears reading the newspaper while drinking coffee, and then proceeds to be abusive to her partner. She gives him alcohol and he then goes to get an abortion, where the doctor shames him and says that he would not be "provoking women" if he dressed more appropriately. Cameron later watches television, where news commentators describe the real news about abortion in the United States. At the end of the video, the words "Not the end" are shown and Cameron asks for donations to women's rights organizations: the National Network of Abortion Funds, Emily's List, HeadCount, and Supermajority. The music video won the MTV Video Music Award for Video for Good on September 12, 2022.

== Charts ==
Weekly chart performance for "Breakfast"
Chart (2022)	Peak position
New Zealand Hot Singles (RMNZ)	27
UK Video Streaming (OCC)	80

== Certifications ==
Certifications for "Breakfast"
Region	Certification	Certified units/sales
Brazil (Pro-Música Brasil)	Gold	20,000^{‡}
United States (RIAA)	Gold	500,000^{‡}
^{‡} Sales+streaming figures based on certification alone.
