= Latin Mafia =

Mexican indie pop band

LATIN MAFIA
- Origin: Monterrey, Mexico
- Genres: Reggaeton; Latin trap; Electronic Music
- Years active: 2021–present
- Label: Rimas
- Members: Milton de la Rosa; Emilio de la Rosa; Mike de la Rosa

Latin Mafia is a Mexican band that blends different genres of music, including pop, R&B, and Latin trap, and consists of twin brothers Milton and Emilio de la Rosa on vocals, with their older brother Mike de la Rosa as the producer. Their first single "Más Humano" was self-released in 2021. While their singles through the end of 2023 were produced independently, in July 2024, the group signed a record deal with Rimas Entertainment. Their debut album Todos los días todo el día was released on 25 October 2024.

Their biggest songs – "Julieta", "Sal Rosa", "Flores", "No Digas Nada" – have each surpassed over two million views on YouTube.

== Career ==
=== 2021–2022 ===
During the COVID-19 pandemic, the brothers first appeared on the scene using the social media app, TikTok. They posted videos consisting of Emilio and Mike sitting in their bedroom as they did when they were children pretending to be in front of a huge audience. When their account received positive views, they included their other sibling Milton to help them release their first single, "Ciudad de las Luces". Though they posted a song to their Facebook account following their slow rise of likes, and when the brothers quickly reached more than 50,000 views they realized that they had talent. After, the release they updated their biography on TikTok to include "Three Brothers, two singers/one producer".

Their next two singles "Más humano" and "Julieta" were released during the same year, both reaching positive responses, both becoming instant hits. By the end of may 2022, they had sold more than 11,000 concert tickets in minutes, selling out the massive Olympic Velodrome in Mexico City.

=== 2023–present ===
In April 2024 Latin Mafia made their American debut performing at Coachella, raising their profile as one of "Mexico's top acts without a label or an album". In addition, they were scheduled to perform at music festivals including Lollapalooza Argentina, Lollapalooza Chile, Colombia's Estéreo Picnic, and Mexico's Tecate Pa’l Norte. According to Music Metrics Vault, as of July 8, 2024, the group had reached nearly 874 million plays, an almost 150 million increase from the previous month. They were also nominated by the Latin Grammy's for the Best New Artist and their song "Siento Que Merezco Más" earned them the Best Latin Fusion Pop Song of 2025 at the Lo Nuestro Awards. On October 17th 2025, Billboard released the list of nominees for the Latin Grammy Awards 2025 and this time the group was nominated in two categories: Best Alternative Music Album with their album Todos los días todo el día and Best Alternative Song with "Siento Que Merezco Más".

== Music style ==
Latin Mafia's music has been described as a reggaetón, R&B, trap, and house hybrid. The three brothers each have musical references that differ from one another, to which Emilio credits the diversity in their repertoire of songs. Some examples cited are Tyler the Creator, Rosalía, Rauw Alejandro, Fred Again.., and Flume, among others.

== Discography ==
- Todos los días todo el día (2024)
- 9 Months & 50 Hours (2026)

== Awards and nominations ==
Year	Award	Category	Nominee	Result
2024	Latin Grammy Awards	Best New Artist	Latin Mafia	Nominated
2024	Lo Nuestro Awards	Best Latin Fusion Song	"Siento que merezco más"	Won
2025	Premios Tu Música Urbano	Indie Artist	Latin Mafia	Nominated
2025	Premios Tu Música Urbano	Indie Song	"2:12 am"	Won

=== Listicles ===
Name of publisher, name of listicle, year(s) listed, and placement result
Publisher	Listicle	Year(s)	Result	Ref.
Billboard	The Best Latin Albums of 2024	2024	11th (Todos los días todo el día)	
Rolling Stone	The 50 Best Latin Albums of 2024	2024	3rd (Todos los días todo el día)	
