= Boyfriend (Dove Cameron song) =

2022 single by Dove Cameron

Single by Dove Cameron

from the EP Alchemical: Volume 1
- Released: February 11, 2022
- Genre: Electropop; power pop
- Length: 2:33
- Label: Disruptor; Columbia
- Songwriters: Delacey; Dove Cameron; Evan Blair; Skyler Stonestreet
- Producer: Evan Blair

Dove Cameron singles chronology
"Taste of You" (2021)	"Boyfriend" (2022)	"Breakfast" (2022)

Music video
- "Boyfriend" on YouTube

"Boyfriend" is a song by American singer Dove Cameron, it was released on February 11, 2022, via Disruptor Records and Columbia Records as the lead single from her debut EP, Alchemical: Volume 1 (2023). The song was written by Cameron, Delacey, Evan Blair and Skyler Stonestreet, with production handled by Blair.

== Background ==
Cameron posted a video containing a portion of the song on TikTok that gained over 4.7 million likes. Although the song was not intended to be released in February, when it went viral, she later announced on Instagram that the song would be released on February 11, 2022.

== Composition ==
An electropop and power pop song, "Boyfriend" references Cameron's sexuality after she came out as queer in 2021 and explicitly describes a romantic relationship with a woman. Melody Heald of Glitter Magazine wrote that the song "hints that her love interest needs a girlfriend, thinking she would treat her better than her boyfriend" by "doing things he'd never do". Cameron said in a press release: "In writing 'Boyfriend,' I feel like I finally found my sound, my perspective, and myself in a way I wasn't sure I ever would. I am so immensely happy to have this song and this part of me out in the world".

== Critical reception ==
Isabella Vega of Euphoria Magazine commented that "Boyfriend" will become a big hit due to "its killer lyricism, or even its almost gothic production, but with its deeply embedded message of self-empowerment". Caitlin White of Uproxx described the song as "dramatic and dark, and hits like a queer James Bond anthem".

== Credits and personnel ==
Credits adapted from Tidal.

- Evan Blair – producer, composer, lyricist, recording engineer
- Delacey – composer, lyricist
- Dove Cameron – composer, lyricist, associated performer
- Skyler Stonestreet – composer, lyricist
- Eric Legg – mastering engineer
- Alex Ghenea – mixing engineer

== Charts ==
=== Weekly charts ===
Weekly chart performance for "Boyfriend"
Chart (2022)	Peak position
Australia (ARIA)	15
Austria (Ö3 Austria Top 40)	18
Belgium (Ultratop 50 Flanders)	40
Canada Hot 100 (Billboard)	25
Canada CHR/Top 40 (Billboard)	10
Canada Hot AC (Billboard)	31
Czech Republic Singles Digital (ČNS IFPI)	29
Finland (Suomen virallinen lista)	18
France (SNEP)	123
Germany (GfK)	26
Global 200 (Billboard)	17
Greece International (IFPI)	8
Hungary (Single Top 40)	19
Hungary (Stream Top 40)	19
Ireland (IRMA)	11
Lithuania (AGATA)	13
Netherlands (Single Top 100)	49
New Zealand (Recorded Music NZ)	19
Norway (VG-lista)	10
Peru (UNIMPRO)	104
Portugal (AFP)	35
Singapore (RIAS)	30
Slovakia (Singles Digitál Top 100)	20
South Africa Streaming (TOSAC)	56
Sweden (Sverigetopplistan)	23
Switzerland (Schweizer Hitparade)	32
UK Singles (Official Charts)	9
US Billboard Hot 100	16
US Adult Contemporary (Billboard)	23
US Adult Pop Airplay (Billboard)	7
US Pop Airplay (Billboard)	2

=== Year-end charts ===
2022 year-end chart performance for "Boyfriend"
Chart (2022)	Position
Belgium (Ultratop 50 Flanders)	180
Canada (Canadian Hot 100)	57
Global 200 (Billboard)	145
Hungary (Stream Top 40)	87
Lithuania (AGATA)	99
US Billboard Hot 100	51
US Adult Top 40 (Billboard)	21
US Mainstream Top 40 (Billboard)	17

== Certifications ==
Certifications and sales for "Boyfriend"
Region	Certification	Certified units/sales
Australia (ARIA)	Platinum	70,000^{‡}
Brazil (Pro-Música Brasil)	Diamond	160,000^{‡}
Canada (Music Canada)	Platinum	80,000^{‡}
Denmark (IFPI Danmark)	Gold	45,000^{‡}
France (SNEP)	Gold	100,000^{‡}
Hungary (MAHASZ)	2× Platinum	8,000^{‡}
Italy (FIMI)	Gold	50,000^{‡}
Mexico (AMPROFON)	Gold	70,000^{‡}
New Zealand (RMNZ)	Platinum	30,000^{‡}
Poland (ZPAV)	Platinum	50,000^{‡}
Portugal (AFP)	Gold	5,000^{‡}
Spain (Promusicae)	Gold	30,000^{‡}
United Kingdom (BPI)	Gold	400,000^{‡}
United States (RIAA)	2× Platinum	2,000,000^{‡}
Streaming
Sweden (GLF)	Gold	4,000,000^{†}
^{‡} Sales+streaming figures based on certification alone.^{†} Streaming-only figures based on certification alone.

== Release history ==
Release history for "Boyfriend"
Region	Date	Format	Label	Ref.
Various	February 11, 2022	Digital download; streaming	Disruptor; Columbia	
Italy	March 4, 2022	Contemporary hit radio	Sony	
United States	March 7, 2022	Adult contemporary radio	Columbia	
