= Dove Cameron discography =

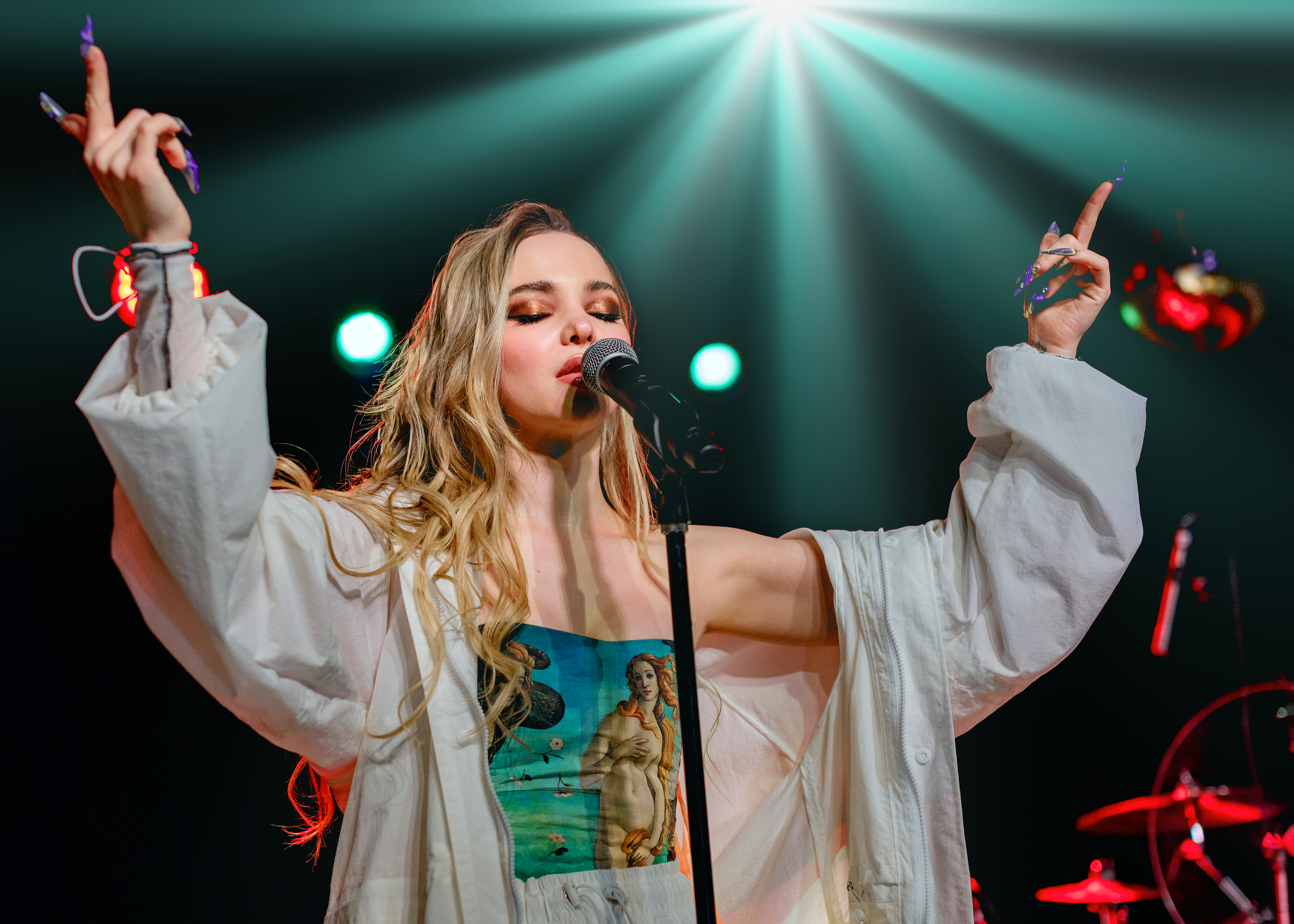
- Cameron performing in 2021
- Studio albums: 1
- EPs: 1
- Soundtrack albums: 4
- Singles: 21
- Promotional singles: 28
- Music videos: 25

American singer and actress Dove Cameron has released one studio album, one EP, four soundtrack albums, twenty-one singles (including two as a featured artist), twenty-eight promotional singles and twenty-five music videos.

From 2015 to 2019, Cameron lent her vocals to the soundtrack albums for Liv and Maddie and the Descendants franchise. The latter's soundtrack for the first film reached number one on the US Billboard 200. She gained the promotional singles "Better in Stereo" and "If Only" which were both certified gold by the Recording Industry Association of America (RIAA). She was also a part of the musical duo The Girl and the Dreamcatcher with her partner Liv and Maddie co-star Ryan McCartan from 2015 to 2016, before the relationship ended.

In 2018, Cameron signed to Disruptor Records, a label under Columbia Records, and released her debut single "Bloodshot" in 2019. After a string of singles, her debut EP Alchemical: Volume 1 was released on December 1, 2023. It was preceded by its lead single "Boyfriend" in 2022, which peaked at number 16 on the US Billboard Hot 100 and was certified double platinum by the RIAA. She released her debut studio album, Final Girl, on November 6, 2026.

== Albums ==
=== Studio albums ===
Title	Album details	Peak chart positions
Title	Album details	UK DL
Final Girl	Released: November 6, 2026; Label: Disruptor, Columbia; Formats: CD, LP, digital download, streaming	31

=== Soundtrack albums ===
List of soundtrack albums, with selected chart positions
Title	Album details	Peak chart positions										Certifications
Title	Album details	US	US OST	AUS	BEL	FRA	GER	ITA	NL	NZ Heat.	SPA	Certifications
Liv and Maddie	Released: March 17, 2015; Formats: CD, digital download, streaming; Label: Walt Disney	180	11	—	—	—	—	—	—	—	—	
Descendants	Released: July 31, 2015; Formats: CD, digital download, streaming; Label: Walt Disney	1	1	57	178	102	50	19	50	—	36	RIAA: Gold; BPI: Silver
Descendants 2	Released: July 21, 2017; Formats: CD, digital download, streaming; Label: Walt Disney	6	1	64	192	135	—	—	—	6	53	RIAA: Gold; BPI: Silver
Descendants 3	Released: August 2, 2019; Formats: CD, digital download, streaming; Label: Walt Disney	7	1	36	110	—	—	—	—	—	—	RIAA: Gold; BPI: Silver
"—" denotes releases that did not chart or were not released in that territory.

== Extended plays ==
List of extended plays, with selected chart positions
Title	Album details	Peak chart positions	
Title	Album details	US Heat.	UK DL
Alchemical: Volume 1	Released: December 1, 2023; Label: Disruptor, Columbia; Format: Digital download, streaming	6	41

== Singles ==
=== As lead artist ===
List of singles as lead artist, showing year released, selected chart positions, certifications and album name
Title	Year	Peak chart positions										Certifications	Album
Title	Year	US	AUS	CAN	GRE	NLD	NOR	NZ	SWE	UK	WW	Certifications	Album
"Bloodshot"	2019	—	—	—	—	—	—	—	—	—	—		Non-album singles
"Waste"	2019	—	—	—	—	—	—	—	—	—	—		Non-album singles
"So Good"	2019	—	—	—	—	—	—	—	—	—	—		Non-album singles
"Out of Touch"	2019	—	—	—	—	—	—	—	—	—	—		Non-album singles
"Remember Me" (featuring Bia)	2020	—	—	—	—	—	—	—	—	—	—		Non-album singles
"We Belong"	2020	—	—	—	—	—	—	—	—	—	—		Non-album singles
"LazyBaby"	2021	—	—	—	—	—	—	— (Note: "LazyBaby" did not enter the NZ Top 40 Singles Chart, but peaked at number 32 on the NZ Hot Singles Chart.)	—	—	—		Non-album singles
"Boyfriend"	2022	16	15	25	8	49	10	19	23	9	17	RIAA: 2× Platinum; ARIA: Platinum; BPI: Gold; GLF: Gold; MC: Platinum	Alchemical: Volume 1
"Breakfast"	2022	—	—	—	—	—	—	— (Note: "Breakfast" did not enter the NZ Top 40 Singles Chart, but peaked at number 27 on the NZ Hot Singles Chart.)	—	— (Note: "Breakfast" did not enter the UK Singles Chart, but peaked at number 80 on the UK Video Streaming Chart.)	—	RIAA: Gold	Alchemical: Volume 1
"Bad Idea"	2022	—	—	—	—	—	—	—	—	—	—		Non-album singles
"Girl Like Me"	2022	—	—	—	—	—	—	—	—	—	—		Non-album singles
"We Go Down Together" (with Khalid)	2023	—	—	100	—	—	—	— (Note: "We Go Down Together" did not enter the NZ Top 40 Singles Chart, but peaked at number seven on the NZ Hot Singles Chart.)	—	—	—		Non-album singles
"Other Boys" (with Marshmello)	2023	— (Note: "Other Boys" did not enter the Billboard Hot 100 chart but peaked at number nine on the US Hot Dance / Electronic songs chart.)	—	—	—	—	—	— (Note: "Other Boys" did not enter the NZ Top 40 Singles Chart, but peaked at number 17 on the NZ Hot Singles Chart.)	—	—	—		Non-album singles
"Lethal Woman"	2023	—	—	—	—	—	—	—	—	—	—		Alchemical: Volume 1
"Sand"	2023	—	—	—	—	—	—	—	—	—	—		Alchemical: Volume 1
"Too Much"	2025	— (Note: "Too Much" did not enter the Billboard Hot 100 chart but peaked at number 6 on the US Hot Dance / Pop songs chart.)	—	—	88	—	—	— (Note: "Too Much" did not enter the NZ Top 40 Singles Chart, but peaked at number 9 on the NZ Hot Singles Chart.)	—	95	—		Non-album singles
"French Girls"	2025	—	—	—	—	—	—	—	—	—	—		Non-album singles
"Romeo"	2025	—	—	—	—	—	—	—	—	—	—		Non-album singles
"Whatever You Like"	2025	—	—	—	—	—	—	—	—	—	—		Non-album singles
"Hello My Old Lover"	2025	—	—	—	—	—	—	— (Note: "Hello My Old Lover" did not enter the NZ Top 40 Singles Chart, but peaked at number 28 on the NZ Hot Singles Chart.)	—	—	—		Non-album singles
"When in Rome"	2026	—	—	—	—	—	—	—	—	—	—		Final Girl
"Do the Math"	2026	—	—	—	—	—	—	—	—	—	—		Final Girl
"Breaks Open"	2026	—	—	—	—	—	—	—	—	—	—		Final Girl
"—" denotes releases that did not chart or were not released in that territory.

=== As featured artist ===
List of singles as featured artist, showing year released, selected chart positions and album name
Title	Year	Peak chart positions		Album
Title	Year	US Club	NZ Hot	Album
"Taste of You" (Rezz featuring Dove Cameron)	2021	26	—	Spiral
"Use Me (Brutal Hearts)" (Diplo featuring Dove Cameron, Sturgill Simpson and Johnny Blue Skies)	2023	—	27	Chapter 2: Swamp Savant
"—" denotes releases that did not chart or were not released in that territory.

=== Promotional singles ===
List of promotional singles, showing year released, selected chart positions, certifications and album name
Title	Year	Peak chart positions				Certifications	Album
Title	Year	US	US KDS	FRA	UK Vid.	Certifications	Album
"On Top of the World"	2013	—	17	—	—		Liv and Maddie
"Better in Stereo"	2013	—	1	—	—	RIAA: Gold	Liv and Maddie
"Cloud 9" (with Luke Benward)	2014	—	—	—	—		Disney Channel Play It Loud
"Count Me In"	2014	—	1	—	—		Liv and Maddie
"You, Me and the Beat"	2014	—	—	—	—		Liv and Maddie
"What a Girl Is" (featuring Christina Grimmie and Baby Kaely)	2015	—	—	—	—		Liv and Maddie
"If Only"	2015	94	2	186	59	RIAA: Platinum; BPI: Silver	Descendants
"Genie in a Bottle"	2016	— (Note: "Genie in a Bottle" did not enter the Billboard Hot 100, but peaked at number 11 on the Bubbling Under Hot 100 chart.)	—	—	—		Non-album promotional singles
"I'm Your Girl" (with Sofia Carson)	2016	—	—	—	—		Non-album promotional singles
"Rather Be with You" (with Sofia Carson, Lauryn McClain and Brenna D'Amico)	2016	—	—	—	—		Descendants 2
"One Second Chance" (with Lauren Donzis)	2016	—	—	—	—		Non-album promotional single
"Evil"	2016	—	—	—	—		Descendants 2
"Power of Two" (with Lauren Donzis)	2017	—	—	—	—		Non-album promotional single
"Better Together" (with Sofia Carson)	2017	—	—	—	—		Descendants 2
"Ways to Be Wicked" (with Sofia Carson, Cameron Boyce and Booboo Stewart)	2017	— (Note: "Ways to Be Wicked" did not enter the Billboard Hot 100, but peaked at number 1 on the Bubbling Under Hot 100 chart.)	—	—	—	RIAA: Platinum; PMB: 2× Platinum	Descendants 2
"My Destiny"	2017	—	—	—	—		Non-album promotional singles
"Key of Life"	2017	—	—	—	—		Non-album promotional singles
"White Christmas"	2017	—	—	—	—		Non-album promotional singles
"Born Ready"	2018	—	—	—	—		Non-album promotional singles
"Stronger" (with China Anne McClain)	2018	—	—	—	—		Non-album promotional singles
"Keep Your Head on Halloween" (with Cast - Descendants)	2019	—	—	—	—		Non-album promotional singles
"Good to Be Bad" (with Sofia Carson, Booboo Stewart, Cameron Boyce, Jadah Marie and Anna Cathcart)	2019	—	—	—	—	RIAA: Gold	Descendants 3
"VK Mashup" (with Sofia Carson, Cameron Boyce and Booboo Stewart)	2019	—	—	—	—		Descendants 3
"Feeling the Love" (with Cast of Descendants: The Royal Wedding)	2021	—	—	—	—		Non-album promotional singles
"Do I Wanna Know?" (from 56 Days)	—	—	—	—			Non-album promotional singles
"—" denotes releases that did not chart or were not released in that territory.

== Other charted songs ==
List of songs, showing year released, selected chart positions, certifications and album name
Title	Year	Peak chart positions			Certifications	Album
Title	Year	US	CAN	UK Vid.	Certifications	Album
"Rotten to the Core" (with Cameron Boyce, Booboo Stewart and Sofia Carson)	2015	38	66	—	RIAA: Platinum; BPI: Silver	Descendants
"Evil like Me" (with Kristin Chenoweth)	2015	— (Note: "Evil Like Me" did not enter the Billboard Hot 100, but peaked at number 12 on the Bubbling Under Hot 100 Singles chart.)	—	—	RIAA: Gold	Descendants
"Set It Off" (with Sofia Carson, Cameron Boyce, Booboo Stewart, Mitchell Hope, Sarah Jeffery and Jeff Lewis)	2015	— (Note: "Set It Off" did not enter the Billboard Hot 100, but peaked at number 6 on the Bubbling Under Hot 100 Singles chart.)	—	—		Descendants
"Space Between" (with Sofia Carson)	2017	—	—	—	RIAA: Gold	Descendants 2
"It's Goin' Down" (with Sofia Carson, Cameron Boyce, Booboo Stewart, China Anne McClain, Mitchell Hope, Thomas Doherty and Dylan Playfair)	2017	77	—	—	RIAA: Platinum	Descendants 2
"You and Me" (with Sofia Carson, Cameron Boyce, Booboo Stewart, Mitchell Hope and Jeff Lewis)	2017	— (Note: "You and Me" did not enter the Billboard Hot 100, but peaked at number 20 on the Bubbling Under Hot 100 Singles chart.)	—	—	RIAA: Gold	Descendants 2
"Do What You Gotta Do" (with Cheyenne Jackson)	2019	—	—	—	RIAA: Gold	Descendants 3
"Night Falls" (with Sofia Carson, Cameron Boyce, Booboo Stewart, China Anne McClain, Thomas Doherty and Dylan Playfair)	2019	84	—	—	RIAA: Platinum; PMB: Platinum	Descendants 3
"One Kiss" (with Sofia Carson and China Anne McClain)	2019	—	—	—	RIAA: Gold; PMB: Gold	Descendants 3
"My Once Upon a Time"	2019	—	—	50		Descendants 3
"Break This Down" (with Sofia Carson, Cameron Boyce, Booboo Stewart, China Anne McClain, Thomas Doherty, Sarah Jeffery, Mitchell Hope, Jadah Marie and Dylan Playfair)	2019	—	—	—	RIAA: Gold; PMB: Platinum	Descendants 3
"—" denotes releases that did not chart or were not released in that territory.

== Guest appearances ==
List of other appearances, showing year released, other artist(s) credited and album name
Title	Year	Other artists	Album
"Future Sounds Like Us"	2013	—N/a	Shake It Up: I <3 Dance
"Let It Snow, Let It Snow, Let It Snow"	2013	—N/a	Disney Holidays Unwrapped
"Jolly to the Core"	2016	Sofia Carson, Cameron Boyce and Booboo Stewart	Disney Channel Holiday Hits
"Mama, I'm a Big Girl Now"	2016	Maddie Baillio, Ariana Grande, Harvey Fierstein, Andrea Martin and Kristin Chenoweth	Hairspray Live!
"Cooties"	2016	—N/a	Hairspray Live!
"You Can't Stop the Beat"	2016	Maddie Baillio, Garrett Clayton, Ariana Grande, Ephraim Sykes, Harvey Fierstein, Martin Short and Kristin Chenoweth	Hairspray Live!
"Step Up – Jess Version"	2017	—N/a	The Lodge: Season 2
"Enjoy the Ride (Part II)"	2021	Cecily Strong and Aaron Tveit	Schmigadoon!
"Welcome to Schmicago"	2023	Tituss Burgess and The Cast of Schmigadoon! Season 2	Schmigadoon! Season 2
"Kaput"	2023	The Cast of Schmigadoon! Season 2	Schmigadoon! Season 2
"Bustin' Out"	2023	Ariana DeBose and Cecily Strong	Schmigadoon! Season 2
"Something Real"	2023	Aaron Tveit	Schmigadoon! Season 2
"You Betrayed Me"	2023	Aaron Tveit and Keegan-Michael Key	Schmigadoon! Season 2

== Music videos ==
List of music videos, showing year released, other artist(s) credited and director(s)
Title	Year	Other artist(s)	Director(s)	Ref.
As lead artist
"Better in Stereo"	2013	None	Brando Dickerson	
"Cloud 9"	2014	Luke Benward	Paul Hoen	
"What a Girl Is"	2015	Christina Grimmie and Baby Kaely	Layne Pavoggi	
"If Only"	2015	None	Kenny Ortega	
"Genie in a Bottle"	2016	None	Jay Martin	
"Jolly to the Core"	2016	Sofia Carson, Cameron Boyce and Booboo Stewart	Unknown	
"Ways to Be Wicked"	2017	Sofia Carson, Cameron Boyce and Booboo Stewart	Kenny Ortega	
"Born Ready"	2018	None	Unknown	
"Stronger"	2018	China Anne McClain	Scott Rhea	
"Good to Be Bad"	2019	Sofia Carson, Booboo Stewart, Cameron Boyce, Jadah Marie and Anna Cathcart	Kenny Ortega	
"Bloodshot"	2019	None	Unknown	
"Waste"	2019	None	Unknown	
"So Good"	2019	None	Griffin Stoddard	
"Out of Touch"	2019	None	Unknown	
"We Belong"	2020	None	Luke Nairn	
"LazyBaby"	2021	None	Jasper Soloff	
"Boyfriend"	2022	None	Lauren Sick	
"Breakfast"	2022	None	Lauren Dunn	
"We Go Down Together"	2023	Khalid	Audrey Ellis Fox	
"Sand"	2023	None	Anastasia Delmark	
"Romeo"	2025	None	Curry Sicong Tian	
"When in Rome"	2026	None	Hannah De Vries	
As featured artist
"Taste of You"	2021	Rezz	Felicity Jayn Heath	
"Use Me (Brutal Hearts)"	2023	Diplo, Sturgill Simpson and Johnny Blue Skies	Austin Peters	
Guest appearances
"Believe"	2015	Shawn Mendes	Jake Kasdan	
"Graduation"	2019	Benny Blanco and Juice Wrld	Jake Schreier	

== See also ==
- List of songs recorded by Dove Cameron
