= List of songs recorded by Dove Cameron =

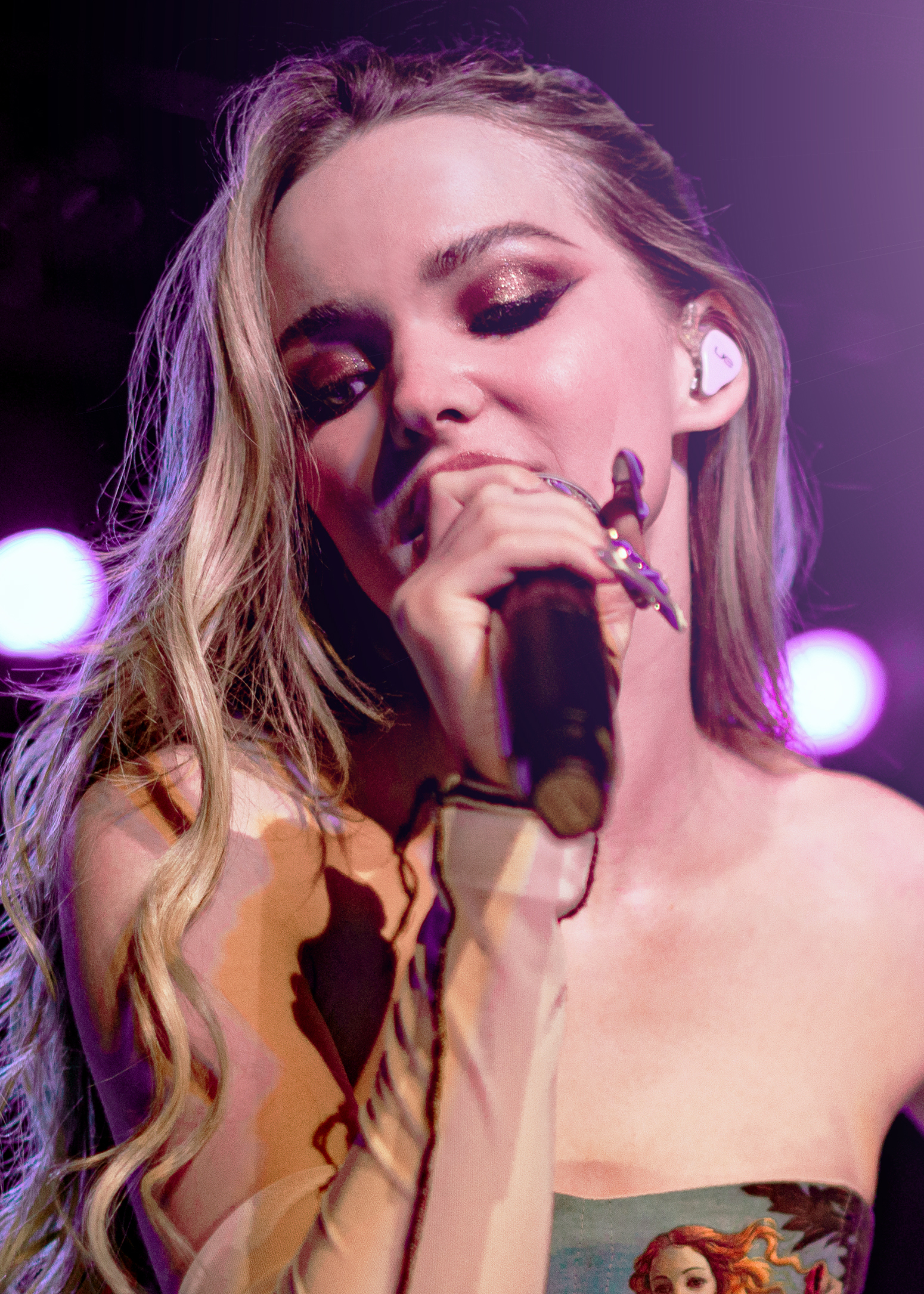
Cameron performing in 2021.

American singer and actress Dove Cameron's professional music career began in 2013 after she was cast in the dual titular roles of the Disney Channel series Liv and Maddie. Alongside singing the theme music for the show, Cameron also soundtracked the music throughout Liv and Maddie. During her time on the series, she was cast in fellow Disney Channel franchise Descendants as Mal, for which she also provided her voice for numerous soundtracks and standalone releases. Cameron has also lent vocals to various soundtracks including Shake It Up: I Love Dance, Cloud 9, Hairspray Live!, The Lodge: Season 2 and Schmigadoon!, as well as singing the theme song of Marvel Rising: Secret Warriors.

Following her departure from Disney Channel, Cameron launched a solo music career with the singles "Bloodshot" and "Waste". After various singles, she released the song "Boyfriend" in 2022. The track gained viral attention on the video-sharing app TikTok, received critical acclaim, and reached the top-20 on the US Billboard Hot 100. She followed it up with her debut extended play, Alchemical: Volume 1 (2023), which was initially intended to be a two-part project until Cameron scrapped plans for a follow-up. She returned to music after a two-year break in 2025 with the single "Too Much", as well as various other singles. She eventually released her debut album, Final Girl, in 2026.

== Songs ==
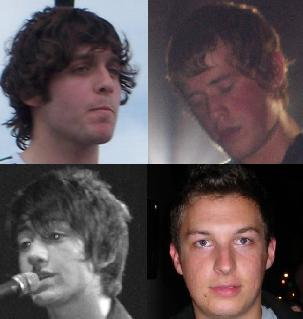
Cameron covered the Arctic Monkeys' "Do I Wanna Know?" for the soundtrack of 56 Days.

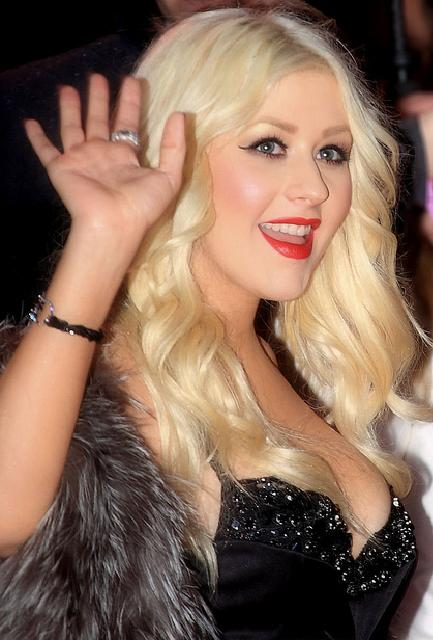
Cameron covered Christina Aguilera's "Genie in a Bottle" as part of the Descendants franchise.

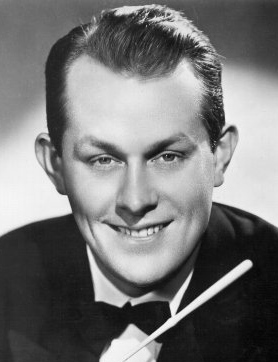
Cameron released a cover of Vaughn Monroe's "Let It Snow! Let It Snow! Let It Snow!" whilst on Disney Channel.

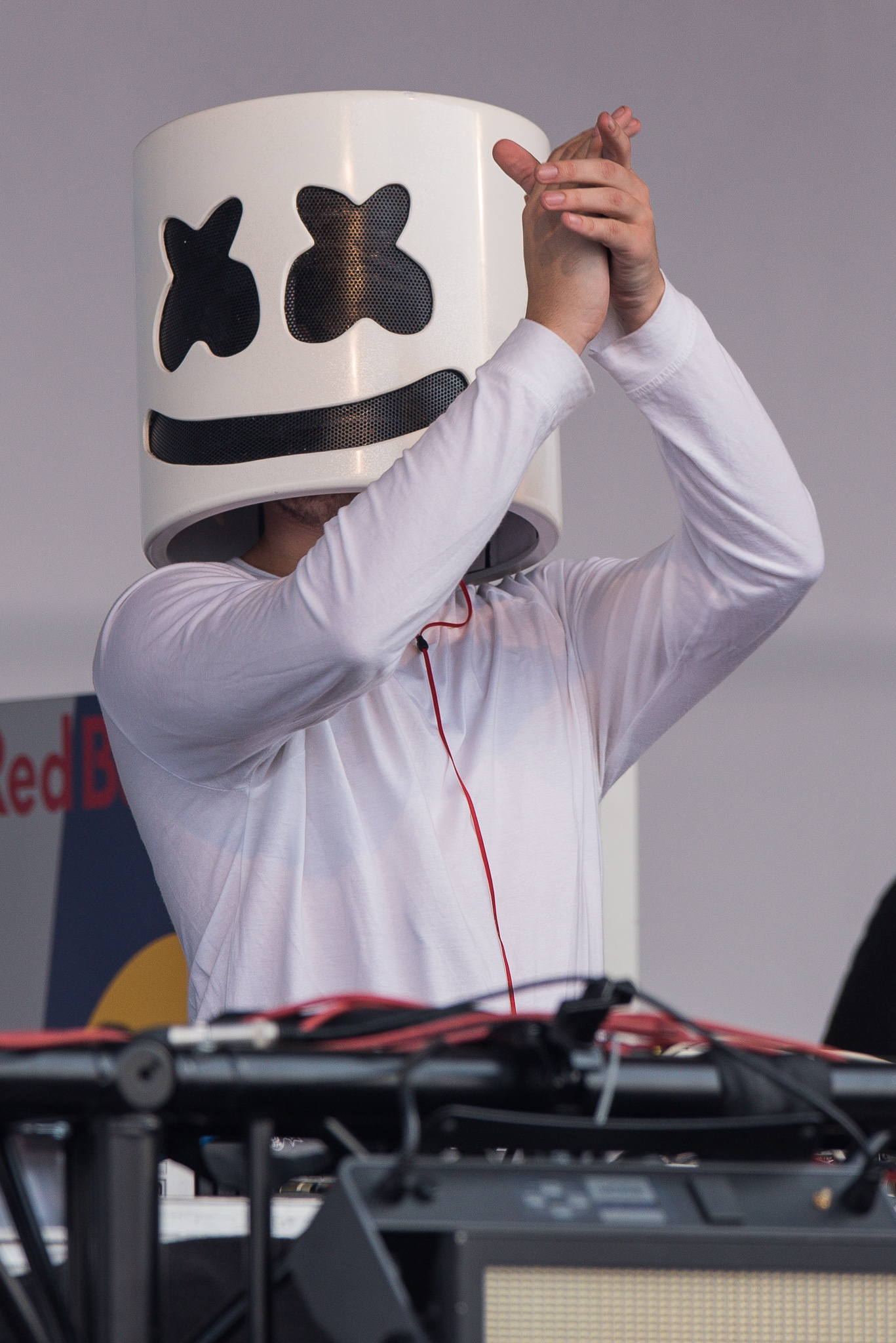
Cameron and DJ Marshmello released "Other Boys" together.

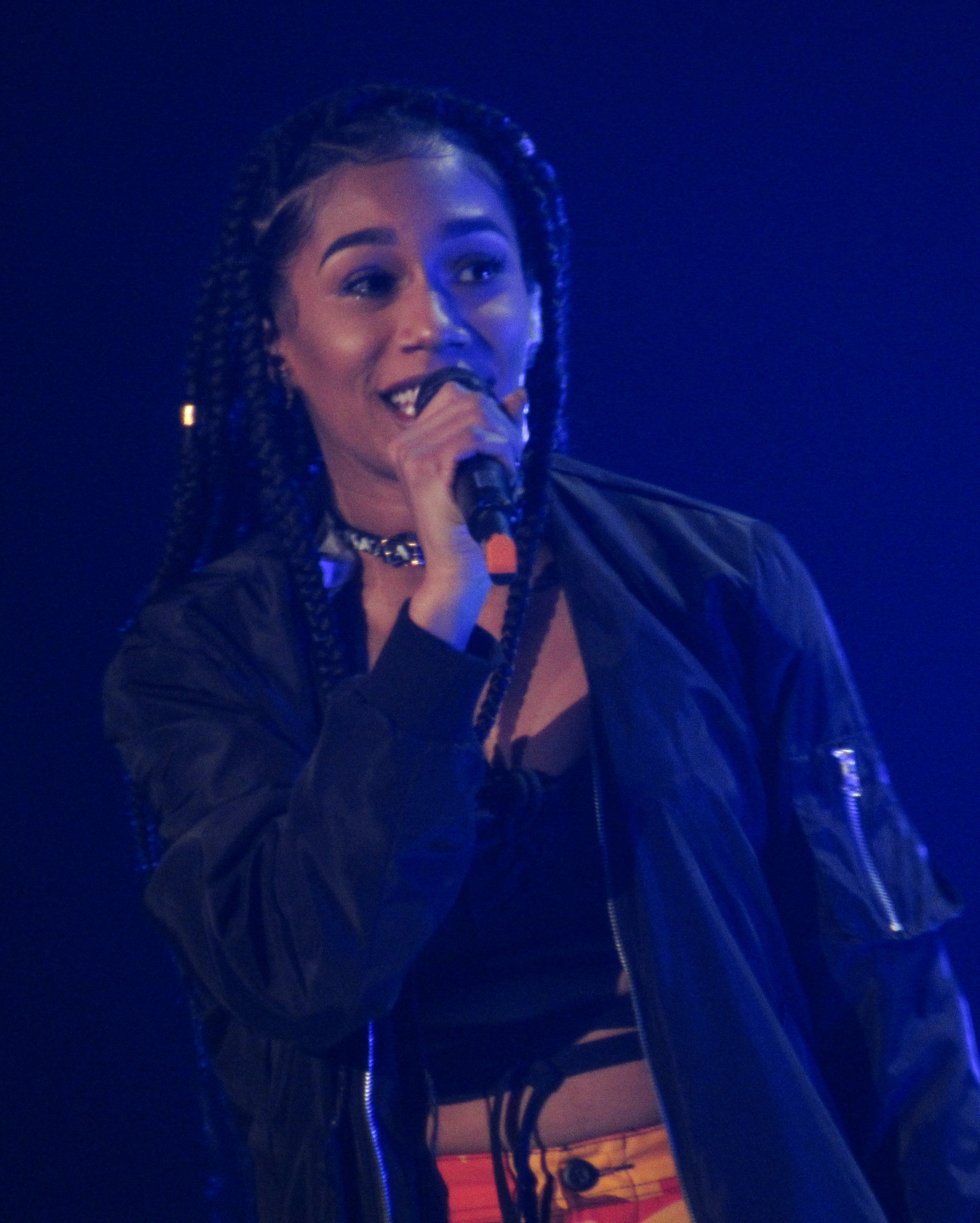
Rapper Bia featured alongside Cameron on "Remember Me".

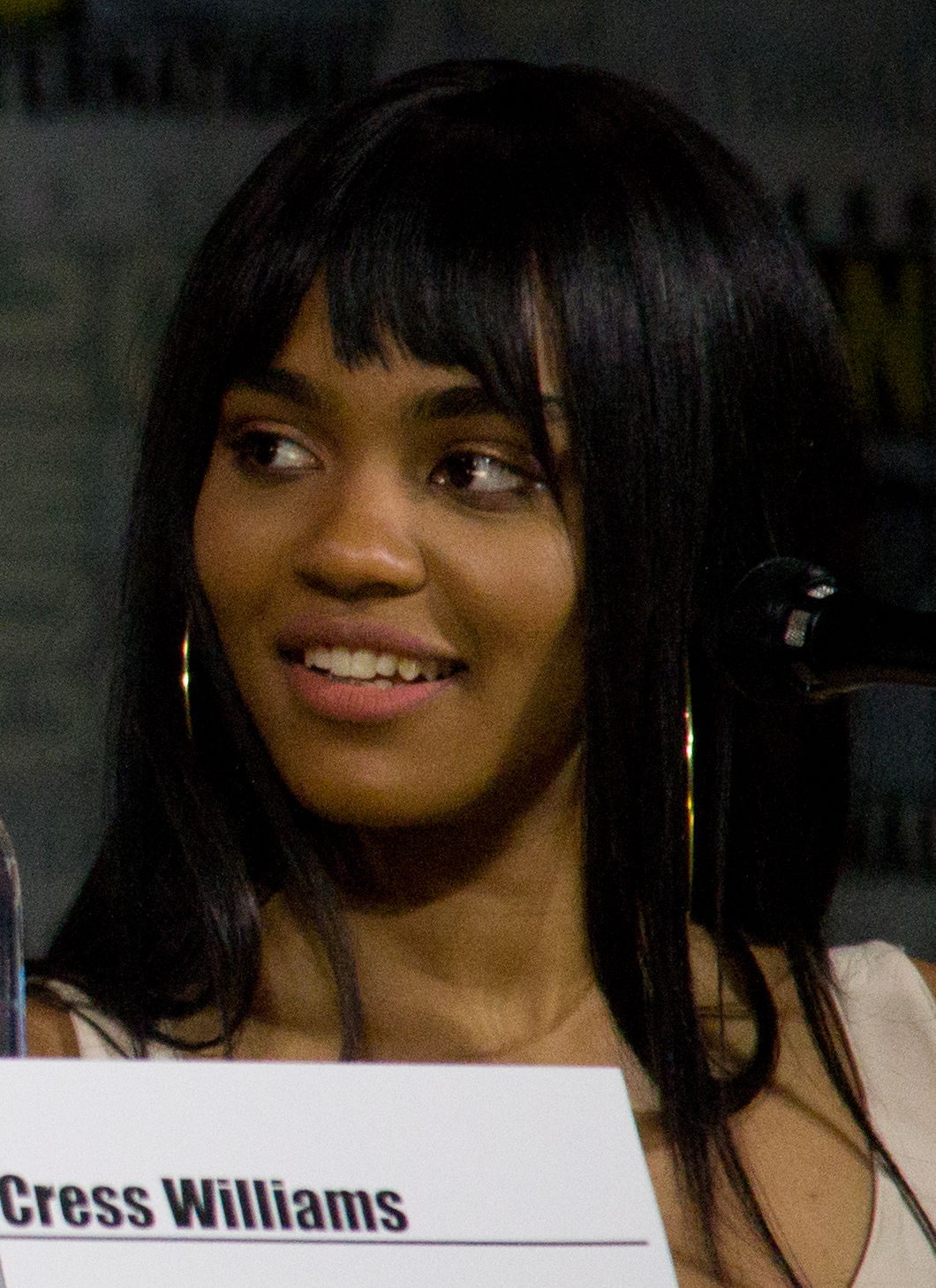
Amongst various recordings together for the Descendants franchise, Cameron and China Anne McClain covered Kelly Clarkson's "Stronger".

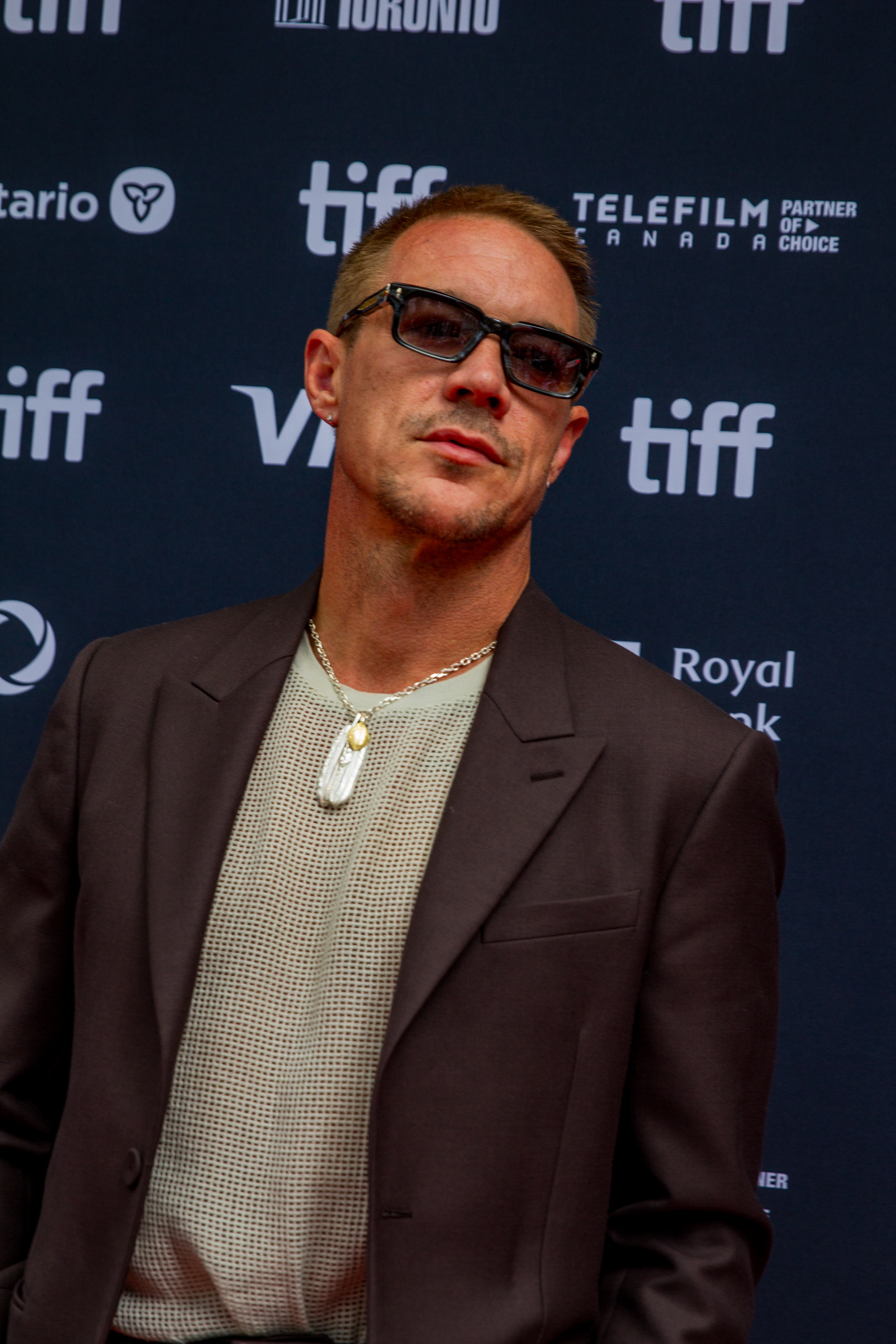
Cameron featured on the Diplo song "Use Me (Brutal Hearts)" in 2023.

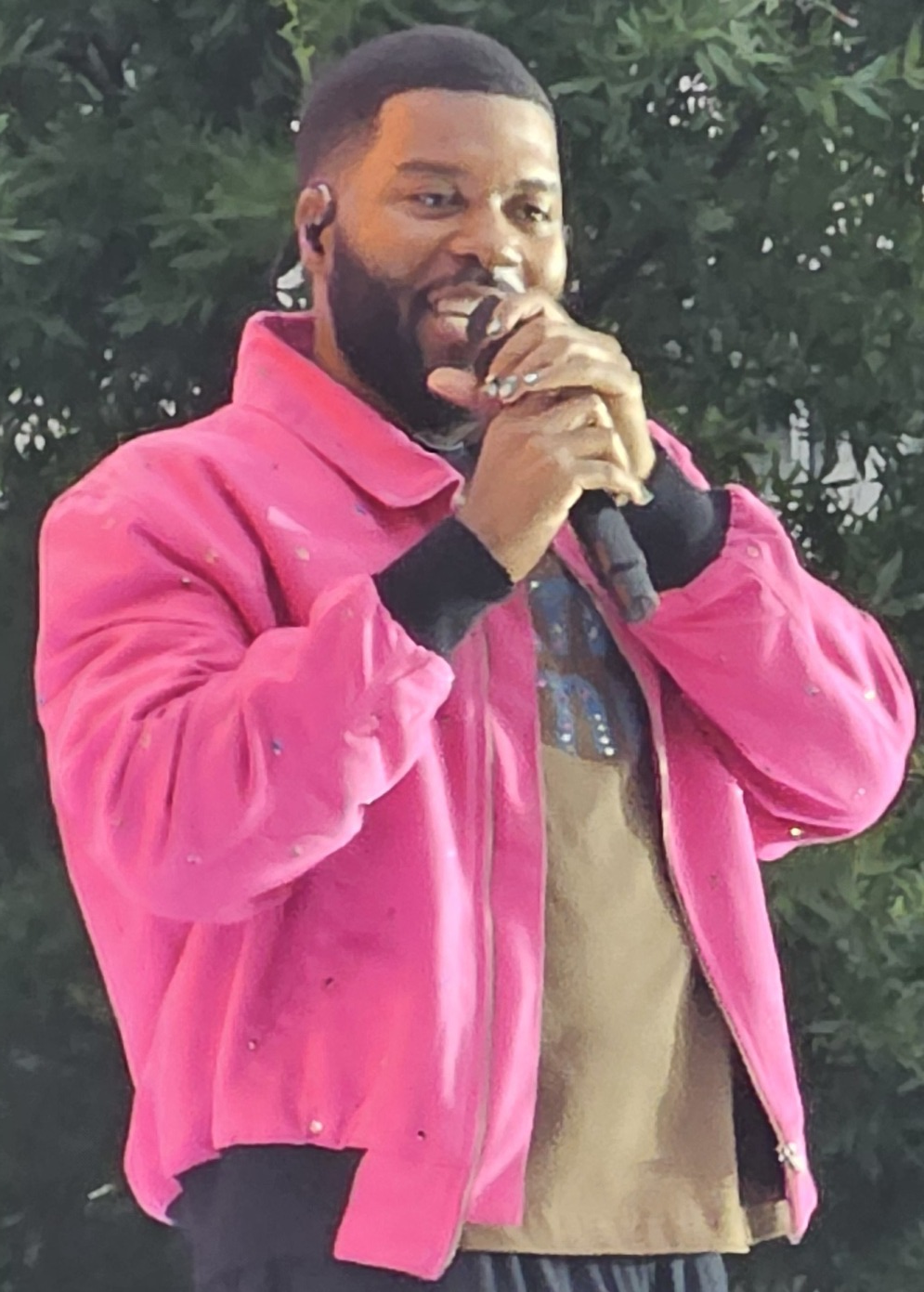
Cameron collaborated with Khalid for "We Go Down Together" in 2023.

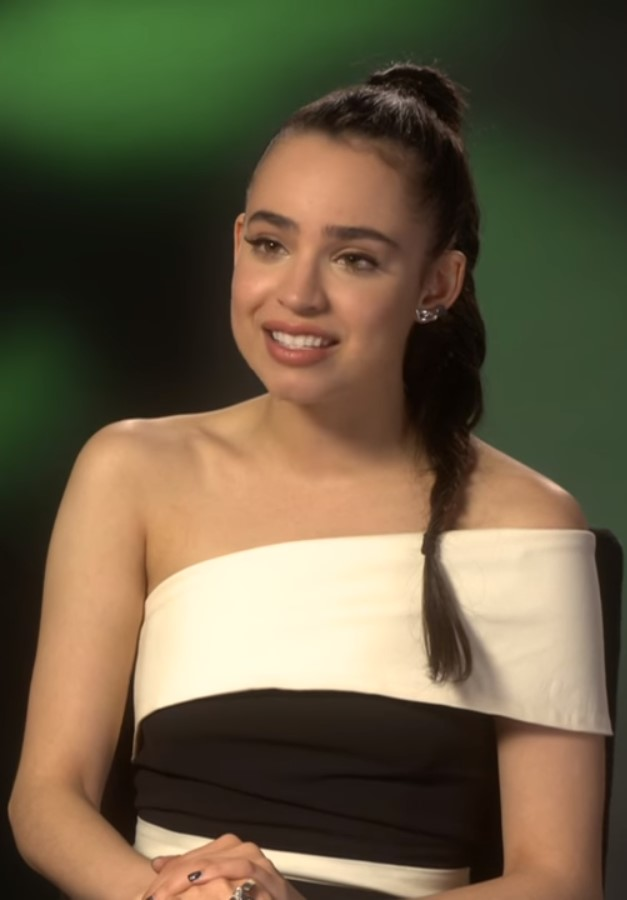
Sofia Carson featured alongside Cameron on numerous songs throughout the Descendants franchise.

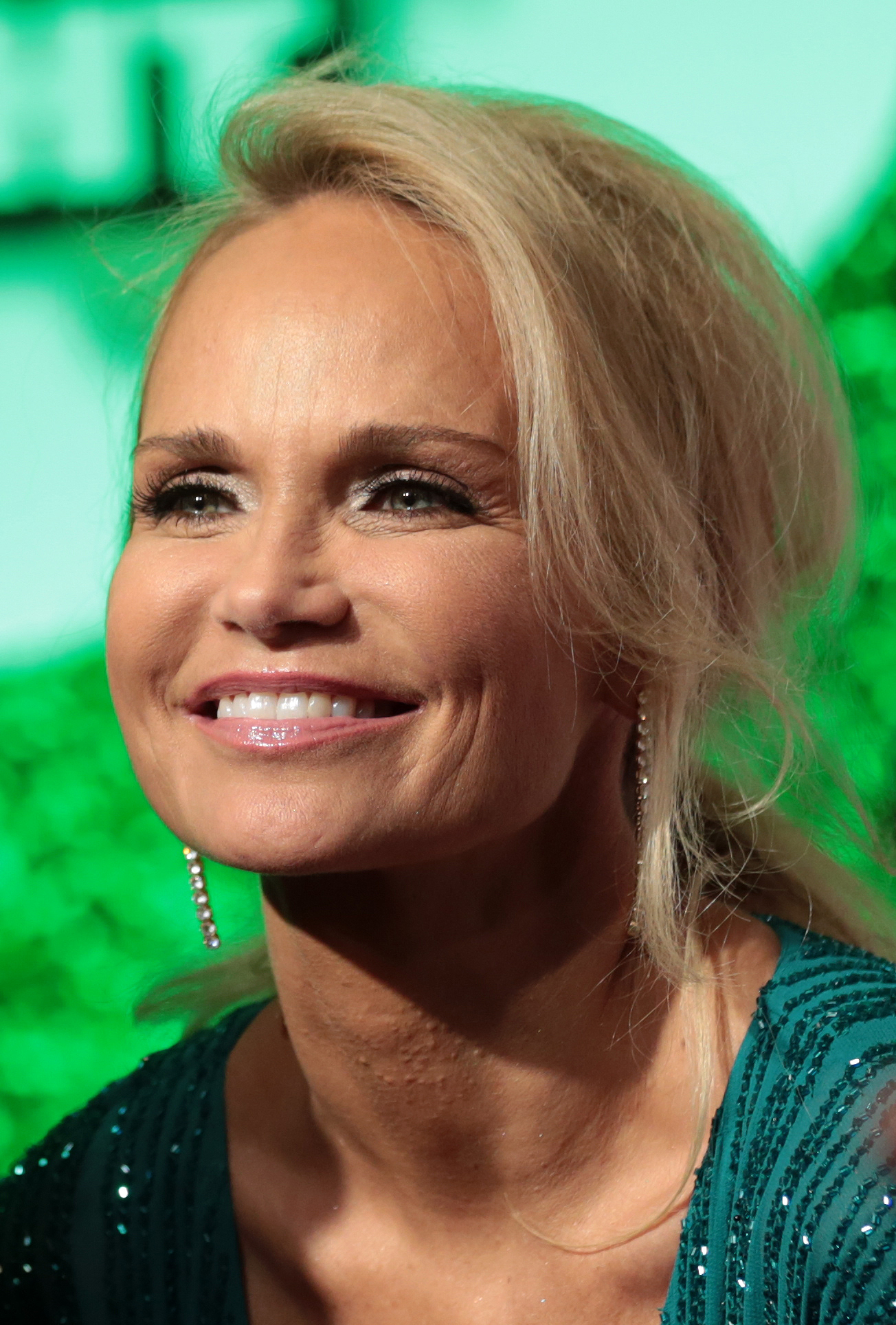
Kristin Chenoweth has appeared alongside Cameron on numerous soundtracks, including Descendants, Hairspray Live! and Schmigadoon!.

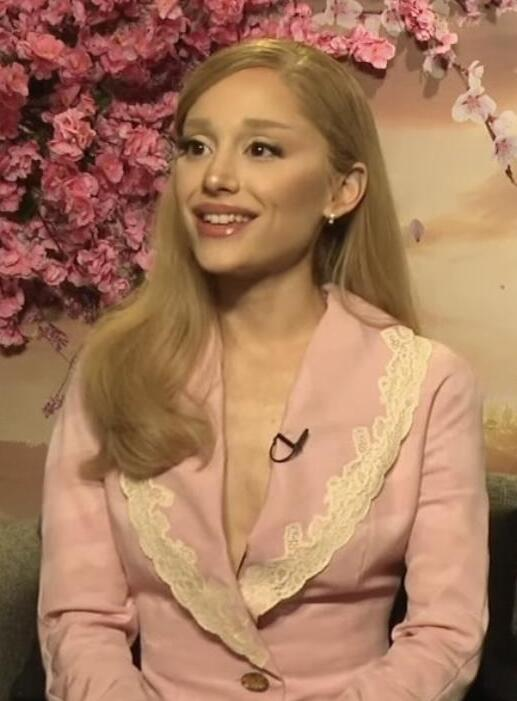
Cameron performed alongside Ariana Grande in two musical numbers for Hairspray Live!.

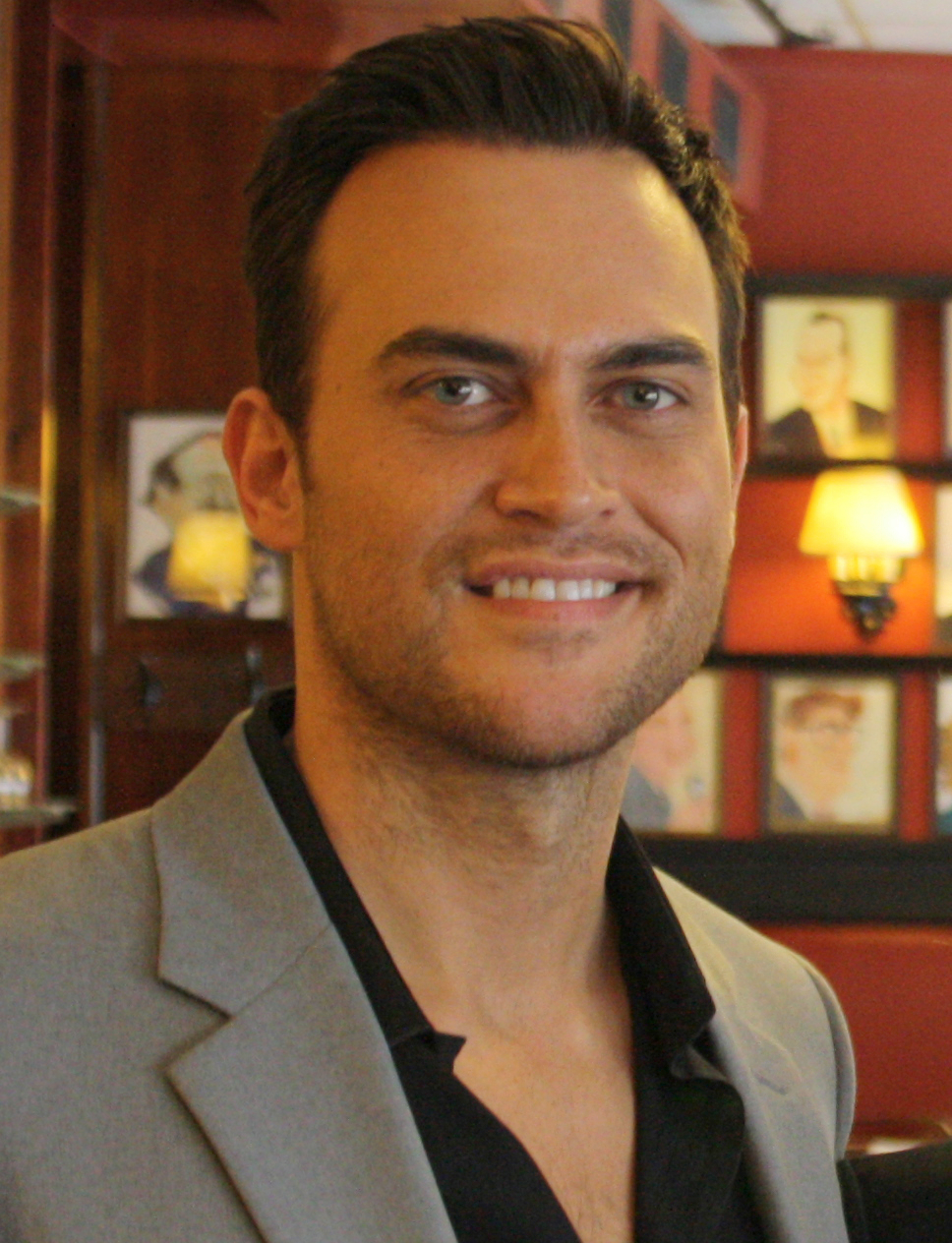
Cameron recorded two songs with Cheyenne Jackson for the Descendants franchise.

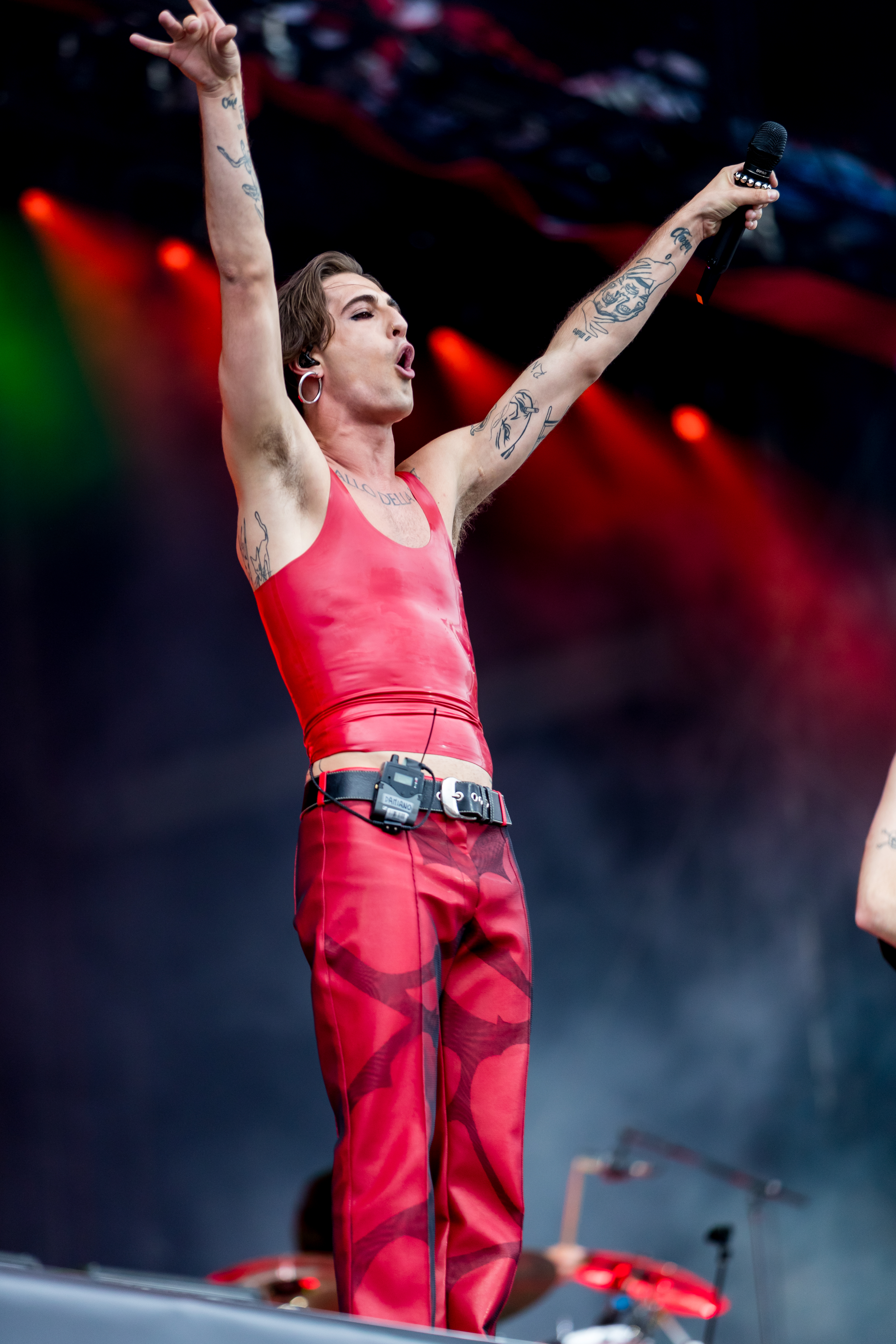
Cameron provided backing vocals for "Zombie Lady" by David Damiano, her partner.

Key
‡	Indicates a single release
‡	Indicates song is a cover of another artist's previous work

Name of song, songwriter(s), originating album and year of release
Song name	Artist(s)	Songwriter(s)	Originating album	Year	Ref.
"As Long as I Have You"	Dove Cameron	Gannin Arnold; Andy Dodd; Adam Watts	Liv and Maddie	2015	
"Bad Idea"	Dove Cameron	Dove Cameron; Evan Blair; Madi Yanofsky	Non-album single	2022	
"Better in Stereo"	Dove Cameron	Bardur Haberg; Oli Jogvansson; Molly Kaye; Paula Winger	Liv and Maddie	2013	
"Better Together"	Dove Cameron and Sofia Carson	Matt Wong; Jack Kugell; Hannah Jones	Descendants 2	2017	
"Bloodshot"	Dove Cameron	Dove Cameron; Carly Paige Waldrip; Downtown Trevor Brown; William Zaire Simmons	Non-album single	2019	
"Born Ready"	Dove Cameron	Doug Rockwell; Tova Litvin	Non-album single	2018	
"Boyfriend"	Dove Cameron	Dove Cameron; Delacey; Evan Blair; Skyler Stonestreet	Alchemical: Volume 1	2022	
"Breakfast"	Dove Cameron	Dove Cameron; Delacey; Evan Blair; Jesse Finkelstein	Alchemical: Volume 1	2022	
"Breaks Open"	Dove Cameron	Dove Cameron; Tom Barnes; Annika Bennett; Megan Bülow; Sarah Hudson; Pete Kelleher	Final Girl	2026	
"Break This Down"	Dove Cameron, Cameron Boyce, Sofia Carson, Booboo Stewart, Jadah Marie, China Anne McClain, Sarah Jeffery, Thomas Doherty, Dylan Playfair, Anna Cathcart, Mitchell Hope, Brenna D'Amico and Zachary Gibson	Jodie Shihadeh; James K. Petrie; Doug Davis; Ben Hostetler; Nikki Sorrentino; Susan Paroff; Anthony Mirabella; Pipo Fernandez; Ali Dee Theodore	Descendants 3	2019	
"Bustin' Out"	Dove Cameron, Ariana DeBose and Cecily Strong	Cinco Paul	Schmigadoon! Season 2	2023	
"Cloud 9"	Dove Cameron and Luke Benward	Dan Book; Alexei Misoul	Disney Channel Play It Loud	2014	
"Cooties" (originally from Hairspray)	Dove Cameron	Marc Shaiman; Scott Whitman	Hairspray Live!	2016	
"Count Me In"	Dove Cameron	Toby Gad; Lindy Robbins	Liv and Maddie	2014	
"Do I Wanna Know?" (originally by Arctic Monkeys)	Dove Cameron	Alex Turner; Jamie Cook; Nick O'Malley; Matt Helders	56 Days	2026	
"Do the Math"	Dove Cameron	Dove Cameron	Final Girl	2026	
"Do What You Gotta Do"	Dove Cameron and Cheyenne Jackson	Matt Wong; Jamie Jones; Jack Kugell	Descendants 3	2019	
"Emerald"	Dove Cameron	Dove Cameron; Pete Kelleher; Ben Kohn; Violet Skies	Final Girl	2026	
"Enjoy the Ride (Part II)"	Dove Cameron, Cecily Strong and Aaron Tveit	Cinco Paul	Schmigadoon!	2021	
"Evil"	Dove Cameron	Dan Book; Shelly Peiken	Descendants 2	2017	
"Evil Like Me"	Kristin Chenoweth and Dove Cameron	Andrew Lippa	Descendants	2015	
"Feeling the Love"	Dove Cameron, Sofia Carson, Cheyenne Jackson and Mitchell Hope	Matthew Tishler; Shridhar Solanki	Non-album single	2021	
"Fragile Things"	Dove Cameron	Dove Cameron; Connor McDonough; Riley McDonough; Ryan Daly	Alchemical: Volume 1	2023	
"French Girls"	Dove Cameron	Dove Cameron; Madison Love; Tyler Spry; Victoria Zaro	Non-album single	2025	
"Froyo Yolo"	Dove Cameron	Eric Peter Goldman; Ron Hart	Liv and Maddie	2015	
"Future Sounds Like Us"	Dove Cameron	Bardur Haberg; Oli Jogvansson; Michelle Lewis; Heidi Rojas	Shake It Up: I <3 Dance	2013	
"Genie in a Bottle" (originally by Christina Aguilera)	Dove Cameron	David Frank; Steve Kipner; Pamela Sheyne	Non-album single	2016	
"Girl Like Me"	Dove Cameron	Dove Cameron; Evan Blair; Lowell; Edwyn Collins	Non-album single	2022	
"God's Game"	Dove Cameron	Dove Cameron; Madison Love; Connor McDonough; Riley McDonough; Ryan Daly	Alchemical: Volume 1	2023	
"Good Is the New Bad"	Dove Cameron, Sofia Carson and China Anne McClain	Aris Archontis; Chen Neeman; Jeannie Lurie	Descendants	2015	
"Good on You"	Dove Cameron	Dove Cameron; Tyler Spry; Victoria Zaro	Final Girl	2026	
"Good to Be Bad"	Dove Cameron, Sofia Carson, Cameron Boyce, Booboo Stewart, Anna Cathcart and Jadah Marie	Tim James; Antonina Armato; Tom Sturges; Adam Schmalholz	Descendants 3	2019	
"Hands of Man"	Dove Cameron	Dove Cameron; Pete Kelleher; Maaike Kito Lebbing; Ben Kohn; Violet Skies	Final Girl	2026	
"Hello My Old Lover"	Dove Cameron	Dove Cameron; Feli Ferraro; Jason Evigan; Mark Schick	Non-album single	2025	
"Hymn for the Weekend" (originally by Coldplay)	Dove Cameron	Guy Berryman; Jonny Buckland; Will Champion; Chris Martin	Non-album single	2019	
"Hot Girl"	Dove Cameron	Dove Cameron; Ilsey Juber; Madison Love; Mark Schick; Eli Teplin	Final Girl	2026	
"If Only"	Dove Cameron	Adam Anders; Nikki Hassman; Peer Åström	Descendants	2015	
"If Only (Reprise)"	Dove Cameron	Adam Anders; Nikki Hassman; Peer Åström	Descendants	2015	
"Immortalized"	Dove Cameron	Dove Cameron; Madison Love; Tyler Spry; Victoria Zaro	Final Girl	2026	
"I'm Your Girl"	Dove Cameron and Sofia Carson	Dustin Burnett; Paula Winger; Stephanie Lewis	Non-album single	2015	
"It's Goin' Down"	Dove Cameron, Sofia Carson, Cameron Boyce, Booboo Stewart, China Anne McClain, Mitchell Hope, Thomas Doherty and Dylan Playfair	Antonina Armato; Tim James; Tom Sturges; Adam Schmalholz	Descendants 2	2017	
"Jolly to the Core"	Dove Cameron, Sofia Carson, Cameron Boyce and Booboo Stewart	Joacim Persson; Shelly Peiken; Johan Alkenäs	Disney Channel Holiday Hits	2016	
"Kaput"	Dove Cameron	Cinco Paul	Schmigadoon! Season 2	2023	
"Key of Life"	Dove Cameron	Dag Lundberg; Nicklas Lif	Non-album single	2017	
"Kiss the Girl" (originally by Samuel E. Wright)	Dove Cameron, Sofia Carson, Cameron Boyce, Booboo Stewart, China Anne McClain and Thomas Doherty	Alan Menken; Howard Ashman	Descendants 2	2017	
"LazyBaby"	Dove Cameron	Dove Cameron; Jonas Jeberg; Marcus Lomax; Melanie Joy Fontana	Non-album single	2021	
"Lethal Woman"	Dove Cameron	Dove Cameron; Connor McDonough; Riley McDonough; Ryan Daly	Alchemical: Volume 1	2023	
"Let It Snow! Let It Snow! Let It Snow!" (originally by Vaughn Monroe)	Dove Cameron	Sammy Cahn	Disney Holidays Unwrapped	2013	
"Mama, I'm a Big Girl Now" (originally from Hairspray)	Dove Cameron, Maddie Baillio, Ariana Grande, Harvey Fierstein, Andrea Martin and Kristin Chenoweth	Marc Shaiman; Scott Whitman	Hairspray Live!	2016	
"Maybe Heaven Is a Jazz Club"	Dove Cameron	Dove Cameron; Madison Love; Tyler Spry; Victoria Zaro	Final Girl	2026	
"My Destiny"	Dove Cameron	David Lawrence; Faye Greenberg	Non-album single	2017	
"My Once Upon a Time"	Dove Cameron	John Kavanaugh; David Goldsmith	Descendants 3	2019	
"Night Falls"	Dove Cameron, Cameron Boyce, Sofia Carson, Booboo Stewart, Jadah Marie, China Anne McClain, Thomas Doherty and Dylan Playfair	Tim James; Antonina Armato; Tom Sturges; Adam Schmalholz	Descendants 3	2019	
"One Kiss"	Sofia Carson, Dove Cameron and China Anne McClain	Matthew Tishler; Paula Wingler	Descendants 3	2019	
"One Second Chance"	Dove Cameron and Lauren Lindsey Donzis	David Lawrence; Faye Greenberg	Non-album single	2017	
"On Top of the World" (originally by Imagine Dragons)	Dove Cameron	Alexander Grant; Benjamin McKee; Daniel Reynolds; Daniel Sermon	Liv and Maddie	2013	
"Other Boys"	Marshmello and Dove Cameron	Giselle Rosselli; Dove Cameron; Grace Barker; Sarah "Solly" Solovay	Non-album single	2023	
"Out of Touch"	Dove Cameron	Dove Cameron; Julia Michaels; Justin Tranter; Tommy King	Non-album single	2019	
"Power of Two"	Dove Cameron and Lauren Lindsey Donzis	David Lawrence; Faye Greenberg	Non-album single	2017	
"Rather Be with You"	Dove Cameron, Sofia Carson, Lauryn McClain and Brenna D'Amico	Jeannie Lurie; Chen Neeman; Aris Archontis	Descendants 2	2017	
"Remember Me"	Dove Cameron (featuring Bia)	Dove Cameron; Bianca Landrau; Sean Douglas; Madison Love; Joe Khajadourian; Alex Schwartz	Non-album single	2020	
"Romeo"	Dove Cameron	Dove Cameron; Madison Love; Grace Barker; Jason Evigan; Lionel Crasta	Non-album single	2025	
"Rotten to the Core"	Dove Cameron, Cameron Boyce, Booboo Stewart and Sofia Carson	Joacim Persson; Shelly Peiken; Johan Alkenäs	Descendants	2015	
"Rotten to the Core (D3 Remix)"	Dove Cameron, Cameron Boyce, Booboo Stewart, Sofia Carson, China Anne McClain, Thomas Doherty, Sarah Jeffery and Jadah Marie	Joacim Persson; Shelly Peiken; Johan Alkenäs	Descendants 3	2019	
"Sand"	Dove Cameron	Dove Cameron; Taylor Upsahl; Isaiah Tejada; Jordan K. Johnson; Michael Pollack; Stefan Johnson	Alchemical: Volume 1	2023	
"Say Hey"	Dove Cameron	Charity Daw; Josh Edmondson; Sam Hollander	Liv and Maddie	2015	
"Set it Off"	Dove Cameron, Sofia Carson, Cameron Boyce, Booboo Stewart, Mitchell Hope, Sarah Jeffery and Jeff Lewis	Sam Hollander; Josh Edmondson; Grant Michaels; Craig Lashley; Charity Daw	Descendants	2015	
"Silver Screen Baby"	Dove Cameron	Dove Cameron; Ilsey Juber; Madison Love; Mark Schick	Final Girl	2026	
"Skin Over Bone"	Dove Cameron	Dove Cameron; Ilsey Juber; Madison Love; Mark Schick	Final Girl	2026	
"Slow Burn" (originally by Kacey Musgraves)	Dove Cameron	Kacey Musgraves; Luke Laird; Natalie Hemby	Non-album single	2019	
"So Good"	Dove Cameron	Dove Cameron; Lisa Scinta; Steph Jones	Non-album single	2019	
"Something Real"	Dove Cameron and Aaron Tveit	Cinco Paul	Schmigadoon! Season 2	2023	
"Space Between"	Dove Cameron and Sofia Carson	Shayna Mordue; Stephen Mark Conley; Tyler Shamy; Andy Dodd	Descendants 2	2017	
"Step Up – Jess Version"	Dove Cameron	Matthew Tishler	The Lodge: Season 2	2017	
"Still"	Dove Cameron	Dove Cameron; Connor McDonough; Riley McDonough; Ryan Daly	Alchemical: Volume 1	2023	
"Stronger" (originally by Kelly Clarkson)	Dove Cameron and China Anne McClain	Greg Kurstin; Jörgen Elofsson; Ali Tamposi; David Gamson; Kelly Clarkson	Non-album single	2018	
"Taste of You"	Rezz (featuring Dove Cameron)	Alexander Healey; Dove Cameron; Isabelle Rezazadeh; Michaela Renée Osborne; Nick Chiari; Shaun Frank	Spiral	2021	
"Too Much"	Dove Cameron	Dove Cameron; Madison Love; Tyler Spry; Victoria Zaro	Non-album single	2025	
"True Love"	Dove Cameron	Adam Anders; Peer Astrom; Shelly Peiken	Liv and Maddie	2015	
"True Love (Piano Duet)"	Dove Cameron and Jordan Fisher	Adam Anders; Peer Astrom; Shelly Peiken	Liv and Maddie	2015	
"Use Me (Brutal Hearts)"	Diplo (featuring Dove Cameron, Sturgill Simpson and Johnny Blue Skies)	Sturgill Simpson; Thomas Wesley Pentz; Clément Picard; Dove Cameron; Eon Sinclair; Jay Malinowski; Maxime Picard; Sekou Lumumba	Chapter 2: Swamp Savant	2023	
"Waste"	Dove Cameron	Dove Cameron; Chloe Angelides; Delacey; Ingrid Andress; Jonas Jeberg	Non-album single	2019	
"Ways to Be Wicked"	Dove Cameron, Sofia Carson, Cameron Boyce and Booboo Stewart	Sam Hollander; Josh Edmondson; Grant Michaels; Charity Daw	Descendants 2	2017	
"We Belong"	Dove Cameron	Dove Cameron; Casey Smith; Jesse Shatkin; Noonie Bao	Non-album single	2020	
"We Go Down Together"	Dove Cameron and Khalid	Dove Cameron; Khalid Robinson; Connor McDonough; Riley McDonough; Ryan Daly; Lindsey Lomis	Non-album single	2023	
"Welcome to Schmicago"	Tituss Burgess, Dove Cameron, Alan Cumming, Jaime Camil, Kristin Chenoweth, Jane Krakowski, Patrick Page and Cast of Schmigadoon!	Cinco Paul	Schmigadoon! Season 2	2023	
"What a Girl Is"	Dove Cameron (solo or featuring Christina Grimmie and Baby Kaely)	Mitch Allan; Nikki Leonti	Liv and Maddie	2015	
"Whatever You Like"	Dove Cameron	Dove Cameron; Tyler Spry; Victoria Zaro; Madison Love	Non-album single	2025	
"When in Rome"	Dove Cameron	Dove Cameron; CJ Baran; Mark Schick; Ilsey Juber; Madison Love	Final Girl	2026	
"White Christmas" (originally by Bing Crosby)	Dove Cameron	Irving Berlin	Non-album single	2017	
"White Glove"	Dove Cameron	Dove Cameron; Connor McDonough; Riley McDonough; Ryan Daly	Alchemical: Volume 1	2023	
"You and Me"	Dove Cameron, Sofia Carson, Cameron Boyce, Booboo Stewart, Mitchell Hope and Jeff Lewis	Mitch Allan; Nikki Leonti	Descendants 2	2017	
"You Betrayed Me"	Aaron Tveit, Keegan-Michael Key and Dove Cameron	Cinco Paul	Schmigadoon! Season 2	2023	
"You Can't Stop the Beat" (originally from Hairspray)	Maddie Baillio, Garrett Clayton, Ariana Grande, Ephraim Sykes, Harvey Fierstein, Martin Short, Jennifer Hudson, Dove Cameron and Kristin Chenoweth	Marc Shaiman; Scott Whitman	Hairspray Live!	2016	
"You, Me and the Beat"	Dove Cameron	Rock Mafia; Adam Schmalholz; Thomas Armato Sturges	Liv and Maddie	2014	
"Zombie Lady"	Damiano David (Note: Cameron provided uncredited vocals for "Zombie Lady".)	Damiano David; Jason Evigan; Sarah Hudson; Mark Schick; Cleo Tighe	Funny Little Fears	2025	

== See also ==
- Dove Cameron discography
- The Girl and the Dreamcatcher discography
