= An Evening With Dove Cameron =

2021 debut concert tour by Dove Cameron

An Evening With Dove Cameron was the debut concert tour by American singer-songwriter Dove Cameron. It began on October 4, 2021, and concluded on October 12, 2021, with six shows across three cities in North America.

== Announcement ==
Cameron announced the tour on August 11, 2021, with three dates in Chicago, Brooklyn, and Los Angeles. Due to demand, secondary shows in Brooklyn and Los Angeles were announced. Due to even higher demand, a third show in Los Angeles was added.

== Reception ==
E! Entertainment gave the show a "double thumbs up".

== Tour dates ==
List of 2021 concerts
| Date | City | Country | Venue |
|---|---|---|---|
| October 4 | Chicago | United States | Schuba's |
| October 6 | Brooklyn | United States | Baby's All Right |
| October 7 | Brooklyn | United States | Baby's All Right |
| October 10 | Los Angeles | United States | The Moroccan Lounge |
| October 11 (matinee) | Los Angeles | United States | The Moroccan Lounge |
| October 11 (evening) | Los Angeles | United States | The Moroccan Lounge |
