= Romeo (Dove Cameron song) =

2025 single by Dove Cameron

Single by Dove Cameron
- Released: June 27, 2025
- Genre: Dark pop
- Length: 3:05
- Label: Disruptor; Columbia
- Songwriters: Dove Cameron; Madison Love; Grace Barker; Jason Evigan; Lionel Crasta
- Producers: Jason Evigan; Lionel Crasta

Dove Cameron singles chronology
"French Girls" (2025)	"Romeo" (2025)	"Whatever You Like" (2025)

Music video
- "Romeo" on YouTube

"Romeo" is a song recorded by American singer Dove Cameron, released by Disruptor and Columbia Records on June 27, 2025. Cameron co-wrote "Romeo" with Madison Love, Gracey, Jason Evigan and Lionel Crasta. The latter of the two handled the production of the track.

"Romeo" is about "taking up space, knowing your worth, and surrendering to love" and was partly inspired by Cameron's relationship with Italian singer Damiano David. Despite the lyrical content being romantic, Cameron wanted it to be a dark pop song and for it to add to her "experimental era in music" that she had come to love making. She wanted the song to "feel bizarre and otherworldly and purposefully lost in space and time", as well as the music video, which was the first to be released from the album.

== Background ==
In April 2025, Cameron headlined "Everything Must Go", an online, live gig where viewers could buy memorabilia from her life and career. The livestream was to raise funds for the National Alliance on Mental Illness (NAMI). The setlist for the gig included "Romeo", marking it as both the first time fans had heard the song, as well as the first time Cameron had performed it.

== Composition and release ==
"Romeo" was released on June 27, 2025. It was described as a "dark pop" song by Dork and was compared to the sound of her debut extended play, Alchemical: Volume 1. Nylon wrote that the meaning behind the song involves "taking up space, knowing your worth, and surrendering to love". They also confirmed that it was partly inspired by Cameron's relationship with Italian singer Damiano David, as well as "a testament to how Cameron built herself back up from rock bottom".

Speaking about the track, Cameron said: "'Romeo' is about a love that feels mythic – a love that feels fated, all consuming and a little dangerous and disarming. I wrote the song and created the visuals to feel bizarre and otherworldly and purposefully lost in space and time. 'Romeo' is a love song at its core and in its lyricism, but wrapped in the dark undulating production that has defined this new experimental era in music for me and that I've come to love so much."

Although initially marketed as a single from her debut album, it was later omitted from the final track listing upon the release of Final Girl (2026). Cameron later stated that she did not resonate with the song when she was assembling the track listing for the album, feeling that it was not confessional enough for the body of work.

== Music video ==
A music video premiered on YouTube alongside the release of the song, marking the first official music video from her album. The video for "Romeo" was directed by Curry Sicong Tian and features Cameron in a dim-lit room surrounded by flying shards of glass, as well as shots of her in a dark desert.

== Credits and personnel ==
Credits adapted from Spotify.

- Dove Cameron – vocals, songwriting
- Madison Love – songwriting, backing vocals
- Gracey – songwriting, backing vocals
- Jason Evigan – songwriting, production, backing vocals, drums, guitar, keyboard, synthesizer
- Lionel Crasta – songwriting, production, backing cocals, bass, drums, keyboard, synthesizer
- Manny Marroquin – mixing engineer
- Zach Pereyra – mastering engineer

== Release history ==
Region	Date	Format	Label	Ref.
Various	June 27, 2025	Digital download; streaming	Disruptor; Columbia	
