= Jasper Soloff =

American photographer and director

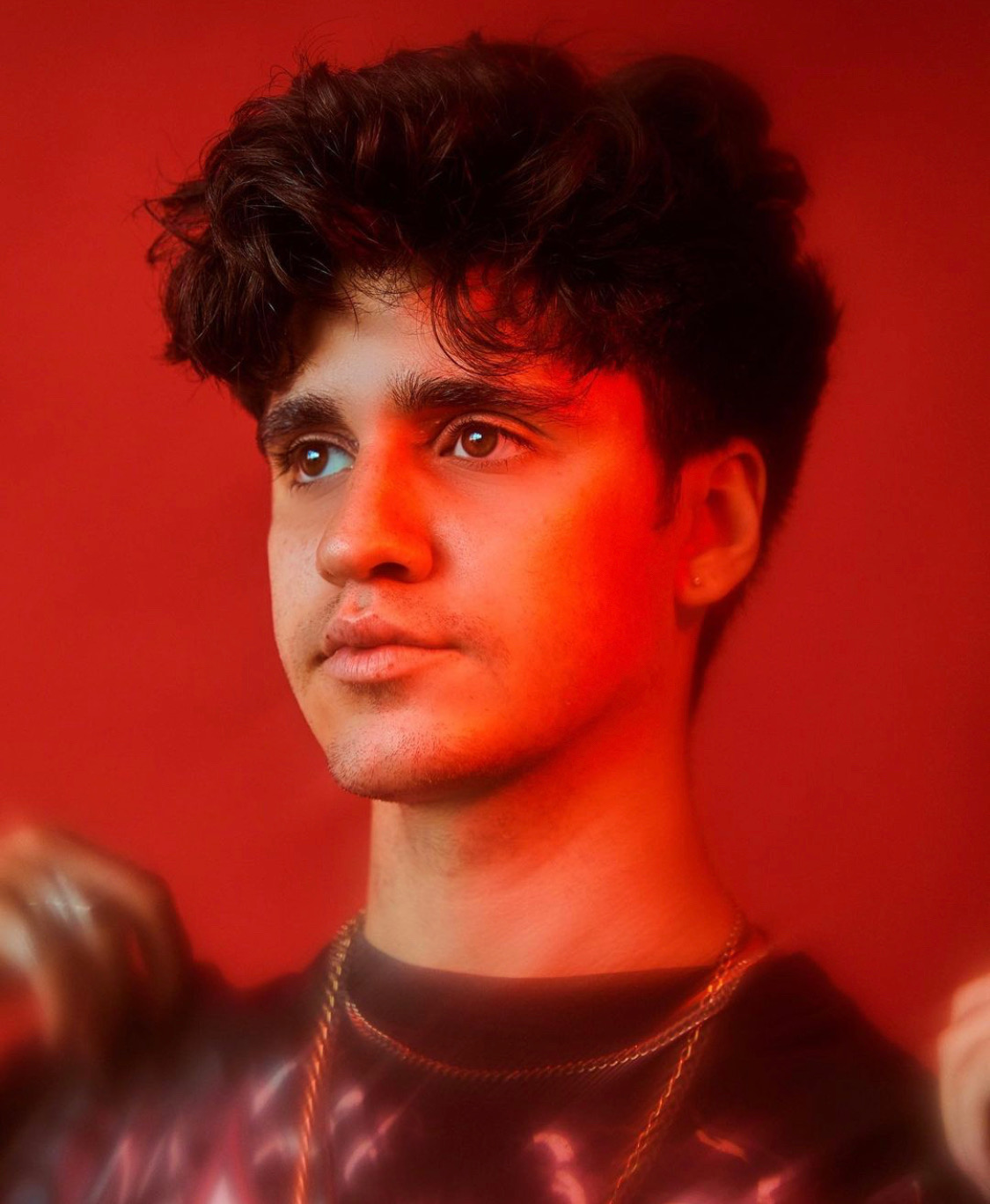
- Born: New York City
- Education: Sarah Lawrence College (BA), Central Saint Martins
- Occupations: Photographer & director
- Height: 5 ft 11 in (180 cm)
- Website: www.jaspersoloff.me

Jasper Soloff is an American photographer and director. His work has appeared in Vogue, GQ, Paper Magazine, Dazed, i-D Magazine, Nylon Magazine, Out Magazine, Gay Times and Billboard. He has directed music videos for RCA Records, Capitol Records, Sony Music and Roc Nation.

== Education ==
Soloff was born in New York City and graduated from Laurel Springs School while also studying dance at Ballet Hispanico and the Gelsey Kirkland Academy of Classical Ballet. He then attended Sarah Lawrence College where he began studying photography in his freshmen year. He studied black and white film photography, developing his darkroom skills under the direction of Michael Spano. He studied color photography under visiting professor Katie Murray. He also studied under Alex Schady at Central Saint Martins.

== Career ==
Soloff has photographed pop culture icons such as Billie Eilish, Dixie & Charli D'Amelio, Dove Cameron, DJ Khaled, Iggy Azalea, Russell Westbrook, Anderson Paak, Emma Chamberlain, Billy Porter (actor), Suni Lee, and Pete Davidson.

He has directed music videos including videos for "Alone" by Loren Gray, "Rascal (Superstar)" by Tinashe, "stupid" & "all my friends are fake" by Tate McRae, "Special" & "HERE'S YOUR SONG" by Chloe Lilac, "Keep On Coming" & "Jump The Fence" by Gia Woods, "Life" by Katy Tiz, "Middle Of A Heartbreak" by Leland and "Liquor Store" by Anna Shoemaker. Soloff is the creative director for the Maybelline "Press Play" global ad campaign featuring Gigi Hadid. Soloff's music videos with Tate McRae and Billy Porter have appeared in Times Square along with his Forever 21 ad campaign featuring Alexis Ren.

== Awards ==
- 2018 VFILES Photographer of the Year
- Billboard 20 Best Videos of 2020 (So Far): Staff Picks
- Pitchfork 8 Best Music Videos of July 2020
