= Dove Cameron =

American actress and singer (born 1996)

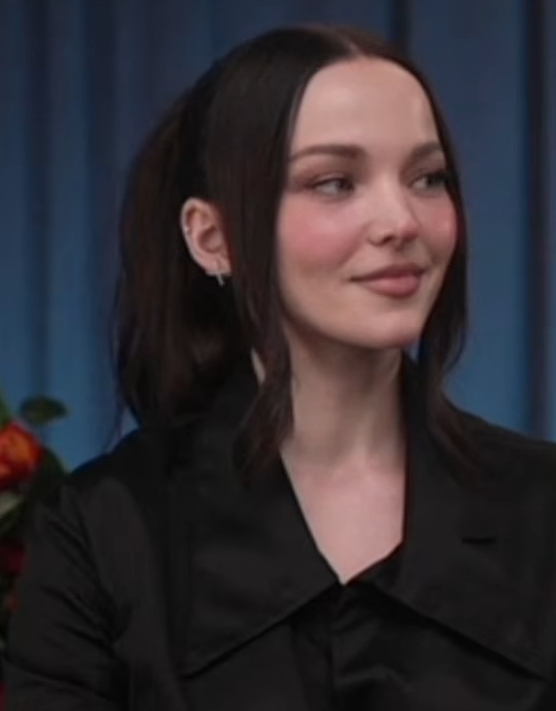
- Cameron in 2026
- Born: Chloe Celeste Hosterman; January 15, 1996 (age 30); Bainbridge Island, Washington, U.S.
- Occupations: Singer; actress
- Years active: 2007–present
- Works: Discography; songs
- Spouse: Damiano David (m. 2026)
- Awards: Full list
- Musical career
- Genres: Pop; goth-pop
- Instrument: Vocals
- Labels: Disruptor; Columbia
- Website: dovecameron.com

Dove Olivia Cameron (born Chloe Celeste Hosterman, January 15, 1996) is an American singer and actress. She rose to fame for her dual role of the eponymous characters in Disney Channel's comedy series Liv and Maddie (2013–2017) and her leading role in the network's Descendants film franchise (2015–2021); the former won her the Daytime Emmy Award for Outstanding Performer in Children's Programming.

Cameron has since starred in feature films such as Barely Lethal (2015), Monsterville: Cabinet of Souls (2015), Dumplin' (2018), Good Mourning (2022), and Vengeance (2022). She also starred in the NBC live television musical Hairspray Live! (2016), and appeared in several television shows, including Agents of S.H.I.E.L.D. and the Marvel Rising franchise.

Cameron lent her vocals to the soundtrack albums for Liv and Maddie (2015) and Descendants (2015–2019). In 2023, she released her debut EP, Alchemical: Volume 1, which was preceded by the single "Boyfriend", which received critical success, reached the top 20 in the US Billboard Hot 100, and was certified double platinum by the Recording Industry Association of America (RIAA).

== Early life ==
Cameron was born Chloe Celeste Hosterman on January 15, 1996, in Bainbridge Island, Washington, to Philip Alan Hosterman and Bonnie Wallace, who later divorced. During her childhood, she attended Sakai Intermediate School. At age eight, she began acting in community theater at Bainbridge Performing Arts. Six years later, her family moved to Los Angeles, California, where she sang in Burbank High School's National Championship Show Choir.

Cameron has stated that she is of French descent and speaks some French. She also has Russian, Slovak and Hungarian ancestry. She has said she was bullied throughout her entire school experience, from fifth grade through the end of high school. Regardless of the pressure at school and fitting in, Cameron stayed focused on her dreams of achieving success in entertainment: "I became very passionate about [becoming an actress and singer]. I fully immersed myself." Her father died in 2011, when she was 15. Following his death, she legally changed her name to Dove Olivia Cameron in honor of her father, who called her by that nickname.

== Career ==
=== 2007–2015: Breakthrough with Disney Channel ===
In 2007, Cameron portrayed the role of Young Cosette in the Bainbridge Performing Arts (BPA) stage production of Les Misérables, and in 2008, she had the lead role of Mary in The Secret Garden, again with BPA. In 2012, Cameron was cast in a Disney Channel comedy series that was to be titled Bits and Pieces in which she would play the role of Alanna. Shortly after filming the pilot, Bits and Pieces was reformatted into Liv and Maddie, which saw Cameron starring in the dual lead role of Liv and Maddie Rooney. The preview of the series debuted on July 19, 2013, and the series premiered on September 15, 2013. The pilot episode gained 5.8 million viewers, which was the most-watched in total viewers in 2.5 years since the series Shake It Up. Disney Channel renewed Liv and Maddie for a 13-episode second season slated to premiere in Fall 2014, which was later expanded to 24 episodes.

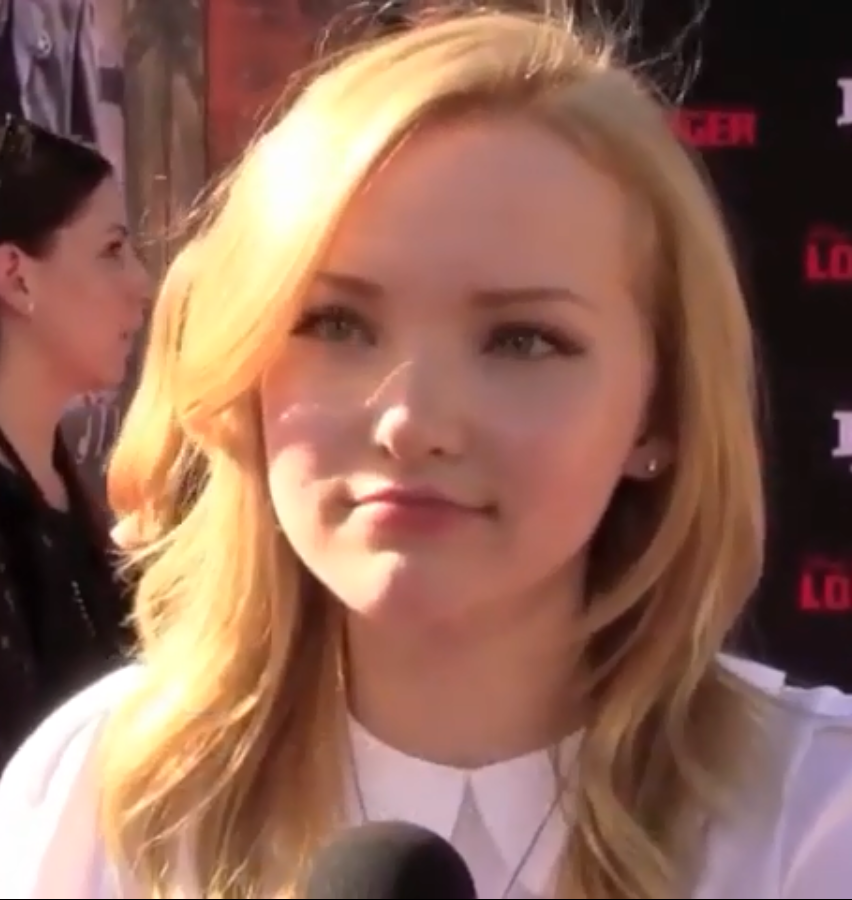
Cameron at a film premiere in 2013.

On August 27, 2013, Cameron released a cover of "On Top of the World" by Imagine Dragons as a promotional single. Her cover peaked on the Billboard Kid Digital Songs chart at 17 and spent three weeks on the chart. On October 15, 2013, "Better in Stereo" was released as a single under Walt Disney Records. "Better in Stereo" made its debut on the Billboard Kid Digital Songs chart at No. 21 before peaking at No. 1, becoming Cameron's first No. 1 hit. In February 2014, Cameron confirmed reports that recording had begun for her debut studio album. Her next single, "Count Me In", was released on June 3, 2014. The song peaked at number one on the Billboard Kids Digital Songs chart. In 2015, Cameron played Liz Larson in her first non-Disney film, Barely Lethal, which was theatrically released by A24 Films.

Cameron starred in the television film Cloud 9, which premiered on January 17, 2014. She later went on to also star in Descendants, which premiered on July 31, 2015. The film was viewed by 6.6 million people and spawned Cameron's two first Billboard Hot 100 songs, "Rotten to the Core" at number 38 and a solo song, "If Only", at number 94. Other songs from the film featuring Cameron, such as "Set It Off" and "Evil Like Me", charted at number 6 and 12 respectively on the Bubbling Under Hot 100 chart. The soundtrack for the movie peaked atop the Billboard 200 chart, becoming the first soundtrack from a Disney Channel Original Movie since High School Musical 2 to do so. As part of the Descendants franchise, Cameron released a cover of the Christina Aguilera's song "Genie in a Bottle". The music video premiered on Disney Channel on March 18, 2016. The single received 22 million views on YouTube in less than a month.

In 2015, Cameron and Ryan McCartan formed a band called The Girl and the Dreamcatcher. On October 2, 2015, they released their first single, "Written in the Stars". The band released their second single, "Glowing in the Dark", on January 29, 2016. The Girl and the Dreamcatcher released their third single, "Someone You Like", on April 8, 2016. They released their fourth single, "Make You Stay", on June 17, 2016. On July 29, 2016, the band released their first EP, Negatives, featuring their singles "Make You Stay" and "Glowing in the Dark" and four new songs. In October 2016, as a result of Cameron's and McCartan's breakup, the musical duo disbanded.

On December 22, 2015, Liv and Maddie was renewed for a fourth season, becoming the ninth live-action Disney Channel series in history to achieve this. Cameron began filming the season, renamed to Liv and Maddie: Cali Style in early 2016. It was later announced that this would be the final season of the series. The series finale of Liv and Maddie later aired on March 24, 2017.

=== 2016–2021: Established actress and music releases ===
Cameron played the role of Amber Von Tussle in the NBC live television presentation of Hairspray Live!, which aired on December 7, 2016. Cameron's performance was praised. She then reprised her role as Mal in Descendants 2, the sequel to Descendants, in 2017. The film premiered on July 21, 2017. The Descendants 2 soundtrack debuted at number six on the Billboard 200, with "It's Goin' Down" from the soundtrack debuting at number 81. Cameron then played the role of Sophie in the Hollywood Bowl live production of Mamma Mia! from July 28 to 30.

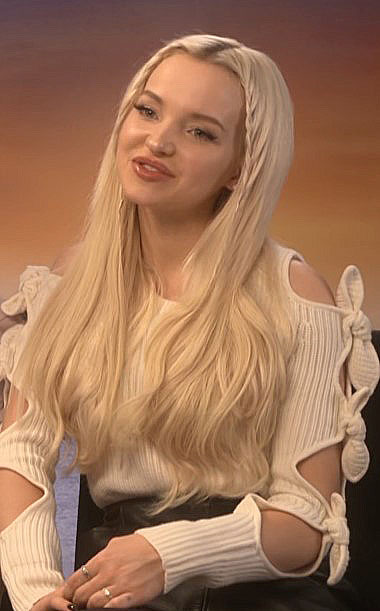
Cameron in a press interview for Descendants 2 in 2017.

On August 21, 2017, Cameron was cast in the Netflix film Dumplin', alongside Jennifer Aniston. Cameron played Bekah Colter in the comedy. In November 2017, Cameron signed on to appear in a recurring role in the fifth season of Agents of S.H.I.E.L.D. by Marvel. This role was later revealed to be Ruby Hale, the daughter of General Hale (Catherine Dent).

In December 2017, Cameron was cast in an animated Marvel project, Marvel Rising, as the voice of Gwen Stacy / Ghost-Spider. On August 13, 2018, Marvel Rising: Initiation, a series of six shorts, was released on Disney XD. The series focused on Cameron's character as she was on the run after being framed for her best friend's murder. Though her character did not appear in the next Marvel Rising installment, Marvel Rising: Secret Warriors, Cameron did perform the film's theme song, "Born Ready". In 2019, Cameron reprised the role in Marvel Rising: Chasing Ghosts.

On March 21, 2018, she announced that she had signed with Disruptor and Columbia Records and that she would begin to release music following the premiere of Descendants 3. Cameron previously auditioned to be signed with Disney Music-owned Hollywood Records, but was rejected following their disinterest in adding to their already large surplus of blonde female singers. It was announced on October 8, 2018, that Cameron would play the role of Cher Horowitz in the stage adaptation of the 1995 film Clueless. In 2019, Cameron starred alongside Renée Fleming in The Light in the Piazza in London. In September 2019, she released two covers on her YouTube channel: "Slow Burn" and "Hymn for the Weekend". Later that month, Cameron released her debut double singles, "Bloodshot" and "Waste". On November 1, 2019, she released her follow-up single, "So Good". She also collaborated with Privé Revaux on a range of sunglasses.

Cameron continued her focus on music by releasing singles "Out of Touch" and "Remember Me", the latter of which features American rapper Bia. On July 24, 2020, she released her next single, "We Belong". This was followed by the release of "LazyBaby" on April 2, 2021. Later in 2021, Cameron joined the main cast of the Apple TV+ musical series Schmigadoon!, which premiered on July 16, 2021. Also in 2021, Cameron reprised her role as Mal for the animated special Descendants: The Royal Wedding. She was cast in the planned CW series Powerpuff as Bubbles, before it was cancelled in 2023.

=== 2022–present: Alchemical and Final Girl ===
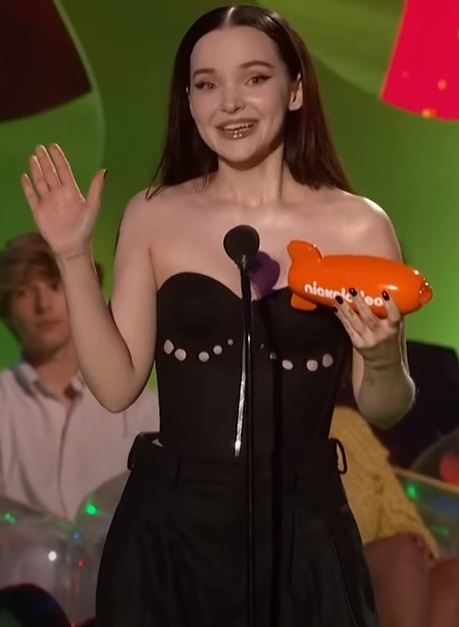
Cameron accepting a Kids' Choice Award in 2023.

On February 11, 2022, Cameron released the single "Boyfriend". This song went viral on TikTok and entered the US Billboard Hot 100 chart at number 16, as well as reaching number 9 on the UK Singles Chart. It was also certified platinum by the RIAA. In March 2022, she was a celebrity contestant and guest judge on the RuPaul's Drag Race episode "Snatch Game". June 2022 saw Cameron release the song "Breakfast", which the music video for went on to win an MTV Video Music Award for Best Video with a Social Message. On August 28, 2022, at the MTV Video Music Awards, she won the award for Best New Artist and performed at the pre-show. Cameron also voiced Ellen Wright, Nate's older teenage sister in the Paramount+ Nicktoon Big Nate, based on the comic strip and book series of the same name.

Throughout the end of 2022, Cameron released a string of standalone singles, including: "Bad Idea", and "Girl Like Me". On November 20, she performed at the American Music Awards and received the award for New Artist of the Year. In 2023, Cameron was part of a string of collaborations including: "We Go Down Together" with Khalid, "Use Me (Brutal Hearts)" with Diplo and Sturgill Simpson and "Other Boys" with Marshmello.

Cameron announced at the 2023 MTV Video Music Awards that she would be releasing a musical project in two parts. The first part, titled Alchemical: Volume 1, was released on December 1, 2023. Despite plans to release a second volume, Cameron scrapped the idea and took a break from releasing music. She noted that she has focused on therapy and "digging and excavation" into her personal pain and depression, which she felt had helped her to shape her debut studio album. She also felt departed from the sound of Alchemical, stating that she was in a different place in her life and in a more positive environment. She returned to music in February 2025 with the single "Too Much", which was followed up by "French Girls" in May. In June 2025, she supported Dua Lipa on the UK leg of her Radical Optimism Tour, as well as releasing "Romeo".

In September 2025, Cameron released "Whatever You Like" about her relationship with Damiano David, followed by "Hello My Old Lover" in November. At the beginning of 2026, Cameron returned to RuPaul's Drag Race as a guest judge; the episode saw a lip sync battle soundtracked by her song "Too Much". Then in February 2026, she starred in the Prime Video series 56 Days alongside Avan Jogia. In May, she began filming for the upcoming coming-of-age thriller film Hot Year. In November, she released her debut studio album, Final Girl.

== Personal life ==
Cameron has stated that she is bisexual, but in May 2021, said that she feels queer is the most accurate way to describe her sexuality. She also identifies as a feminist.

From August 2013 until 2016, she was in a relationship with her Liv and Maddie co-star Ryan McCartan. They announced their engagement on April 14, 2016, but the relationship ended in October 2016.

From 2017 until 2020, Cameron was in a relationship with her Descendants 2 co-star Thomas Doherty. In November 2023, Vanity Fair Italy reported that Cameron was dating Italian singer Damiano David, with whom she made her first public appearance in February 2024. David and Cameron announced their engagement in January 2026. On September 24, 2026, they got married at the Palazzo dei Priori in Montalcino, Tuscany, Italy.

In May 2022, Cameron spoke about her struggles with depression and dysphoria in an Instagram post.

== Acting credits ==
=== Film ===
| Year | Title | Role | Notes | Ref. |
|---|---|---|---|---|
| 2015 | Barely Lethal | Liz Larson | | |
| 2015 | Monsterville: Cabinet of Souls | Beth | Direct-to-video film | |
| 2018 | Dumplin' | Bekah Colter | | |
| 2019 | The Angry Birds Movie 2 | Ella | Voice role | |
| 2022 | Good Mourning | Olive | | |
| 2022 | Vengeance | Kansas City Shaw | | |
| 2024 | Love Me Dead | Cassi Webber | | |
| TBA | Hot Year | Emma | Filming | |

=== Television ===
| Year | Title | Role | Notes | Ref. |
|---|---|---|---|---|
| 2012 | Shameless | Holly Herkimer | Episodes: "A Beautiful Mess" and "Father's Day" | |
| 2012 | The Mentalist | Charlotte Anne Jane | Episode: "Devil's Cherry" | |
| 2013 | Malibu Country | Sienna | Episode: "Push Comes to Shove" | |
| 2013–2017 | Liv and Maddie | Liv Rooney / Maddie Rooney | Title (dual) roles; 80 episodes | |
| 2014 | Cloud 9 | Kayla Morgan | Television film | |
| 2015 | Austin & Ally | Bobbie | Episode: "Duos & Deception" | |
| 2015 | Descendants | Mal | Television film | |
| 2015–2017 | Descendants: Wicked World | Mal | Voice role; 31 episodes | |
| 2016 | Hairspray Live! | Amber Von Tussle | NBC live production | |
| 2016 | Ultimate Spider-Man | Gwen Stacy / Spider-Gwen, Police Officer | Voice role; Episode: "Return to the Spider-Verse Part 4" | |
| 2017 | Project Runway | Herself (judge) | Episode: "Descending into Good and Evil" | |
| 2017 | Descendants 2 | Mal | Television film | |
| 2017 | The Lodge | Jess | Recurring role; 4 episodes (season 2) | |
| 2018 | Agents of S.H.I.E.L.D. | Ruby Hale | Recurring role; 6 episodes (season 5) | |
| 2018 | Soy Luna | Herself | Episode: "Invitadas especiales, sobre ruedas" | |
| 2018 | Home: Adventures with Tip & Oh | Bonnie | Voice role; Episode: "Friend Like Tip" | |
| 2018 | Marvel Rising: Initiation | Gwen Stacy / Ghost-Spider | Voice role; television shorts | |
| 2018 | Angie Tribeca | Grace | Episode: "Glitch Perfect" | |
| 2018 | Under the Sea: A Descendants Story | Mal | TV short form special | |
| 2019 | Descendants 3 | Mal | Television film | |
| 2019 | Celebrity Family Feud | Herself | Contestant | |
| 2019 | Marvel Rising specials | Ghost-Spider | Voice role; television specials | |
| 2020 | The Disney Family Singalong | Herself | Television special | |
| 2021 | Descendants: The Royal Wedding | Mal | Voice role; television special | |
| 2022, 2026 | RuPaul's Drag Race | Herself | Special guest judge; Episodes: "Snatch Game" and "Q-Pop Girl Groups" | |
| 2021–2023 | Schmigadoon! | Betsy McDonough | Main role; 5 episodes (season 1) | |
| 2021–2023 | Schmigadoon! | Jenny Banks | Main role; 6 episodes (season 2) | |
| 2022–2024 | Big Nate | Ellen Wright | Voice role; 17 episodes | |
| 2023 | History of the World, Part II | Anastasia Romanov | Recurring role; 3 episodes | |
| 2026 | 56 Days | Ciara Wyse / Megan Martin | Lead role; 8 episodes | |

=== Stage ===
| Year | Title | Role | Notes |
|---|---|---|---|
| 2007 | Les Misérables | Young Cosette | Bainbridge Performing Arts (BPA) production |
| 2008 | The Secret Garden | Mary Lennox | BPA production |
| 2017 | Mamma Mia! | Sophie Sheridan | Hollywood Bowl |
| 2018–2019 | Clueless: The Musical | Cher Horowitz | Off-Broadway |
| 2019 | The Light in the Piazza | Clara Johnson | Southbank Centre |
| 2019 | The Light in the Piazza | Clara Johnson | Dorothy Chandler Pavilion |

== Discography ==
Studio albums

- Final Girl (2026)

Extended plays

- Alchemical: Volume 1 (2023)

== Tours ==
Headlining

- An Evening With Dove Cameron (2021)
- The Alchemical Pop-Up Events (2023)

Opening act

- Dua Lipa - Radical Optimism Tour (2025)
- Sombr - You Are the Reason Tour (2026)

Festivals

- KIIS-FM Jingle Ball (2022)
