= Hello My Old Lover =

2025 single by Dove Cameron

Single by Dove Cameron
- Released: November 7, 2025
- Length: 3:09
- Label: Disruptor; Columbia
- Songwriters: Dove Cameron; Feli Ferraro; Jason Evigan; Mark Schick
- Producers: Jason Evigan; Mark Schick

Dove Cameron singles chronology
"Whatever You Like" (2025)	"Hello My Old Lover" (2025)	"When in Rome" (2026)

Visualizer
- "Hello My Old Lover" on YouTube

"Hello My Old Lover" is a song recorded by American singer-songwriter Dove Cameron. It was released by Disruptor and Columbia Records on November 7, 2025. She co-wrote the song alongside Feli Ferraro, Jason Evigan and Mark Schick; Evigan and Schick also produced the track.

The lyrical content of "Hello My Old Lover" explores Cameron writing a letter to her ex-partner, although she warns them not to read it for their own peace of mind. On the track, Cameron sings about how loving herself has allowed herself to be sincerely loved by her new partner. It has been described as one of the "most laid-back songs" in Cameron's catalogue. It charted at number 28 on the New Zealand Hot Singles chart.

== Composition and release ==
"Hello My Old Lover" was noted as one of the "most laid-back songs" in Cameron's catalogue. The song relies heavily on a piano. Euphoria compared its sonics to "How Does It Feel to Be Forgotten" by Selena Gomez and Benny Blanco. The structure of the song explores Cameron writing a letter to an ex, but warning them that they should not read it for their peace of mind, since she now feels sincerely loved. It also details how time and space have changed both Cameron and her ex.

Cameron wrote "Hello My Old Lover" with Feli Ferraro, Jason Evigan and Mark Schick; Evigan and Schick also handled production of the track. She wrote the song at "a time of healing and cracking open", noting that she was seeing the world around her in a new light. This was why Cameron chose for the production of the track to be simplistic: she only wanted piano, strings and several layers of her voice to match the vibes of her journal entries. On the message of the song, Cameron explained that it would be too easy to say that other people's unhealthy love made her doubt herself; but that her own feelings towards herself also harmed her. She wanted "Hello My Old Lover" to feel like "a home coming", since loving herself had allowed the opportunity to be loved by a new partner. The song was released on November 7, 2025. It marks the fifth single from Cameron's upcoming studio album;

Cameron had initially completed an iteration of the album prior to writing "Hello My Old Lover", with the track listing set to change following its release. However, although initially marketed as a single from her debut album, it was later omitted from the final track listing upon the release of Final Girl (2026). Cameron later stated that she did not resonate with the song when she was assembling the track listing for the album, feeling that it was not confessional enough for the body of work.

== Credits and personnel ==
Credits adapted from Spotify.

- Dove Cameron – vocals, songwriting
- Feli Ferraro – songwriting
- Jason Evigan – songwriting, production, keyboard, piano, programming
- Mark Schick – songwiting, production, bass, electric guitar, keyboard, programming
- Nathan Phillips – mixing engineer
- Dale Becker – mastering engineer
- Adam Burt – assistant mastering engineer

== Charts ==
Chart performance for "Hello My Old Lover"
Chart (2025)	Peak position
New Zealand Hot Singles (RMNZ)	28

== Release history ==
Region	Date	Format	Label	Ref.
Various	November 7, 2025	Digital download; streaming	Disruptor; Columbia	
