= LazyBaby =

2021 single by Dove Cameron

Single by Dove Cameron
- Released: April 2, 2021
- Genre: Disco-pop
- Length: 2:41
- Label: Disruptor; Columbia
- Songwriters: Dove Cameron; Jonas Jeberg; Marcus Lomax; Melanie Joy Fontana
- Producer: Jonas Jeberg

Dove Cameron singles chronology
"We Belong" (2020)	"LazyBaby" (2021)	"Taste of You" (2021)

"LazyBaby" is a song recorded by American singer and songwriter Dove Cameron, released by Disruptor and Columbia on April 2, 2021. Cameron based the song around the breakdown of a romantic relationship, but labeled it a "breakthrough song". Following the release of her 2022 breakthrough song "Boyfriend", "LazyBaby" was removed from streaming services.

== Release and composition ==
Speaking on co-writing the song with Jonas Jeberg, Marcus Lomax and Melanie Joy Fontana, she liked that the song could incorporate numerous experiences. She felt that it makes "LazyBaby" relatable since it is a mixture of people's feelings, which came together to form a "common narrative". Cameron stated that "LazyBaby" is based on her breakup with ex-boyfriend Thomas Doherty, since she "knew that [she] had to write a song about it" and acknowledge it, since she always addresses her personal experiences through music. Cameron opined that "LazyBaby" is not a breakup song, but is instead a "breakthrough song". She explained that it is not a hateful or malicious song, and that there is "a wink inside every lyric". Talking about the lyrical content, Cameron said that it is about still loving somebody, but choosing to end the relationship to "put yourself first" and "give yourself all the love you had been giving to them". Cameron noted that writing a song like "LazyBaby" was important for her mental health. She explained that she needed a song to help her not "collapse into a pile of nothing". Cameron described "LazyBaby" as a funny song, since it reframes heartbreak into a way that helps people cope with it. She released it with the intention of bringing "joy" and music that "feels euphoric". The song is a mixture between the disco and pop genres, and has been compared to the work of Dua Lipa.

Cameron hinted the release of the song with various social media posts prior to its release. On February 25, 2021, Cameron hosted an Instagram livestream, where she played a snippet of the song to viewers. The song was described by Glamour as "a fun anthem about bouncing back after heartbreak". The release of "LazyBaby" was described by Gay Times as Cameron's "big return" to music. Cameron felt that with the release of "LazyBaby", it was marking a point in her musical career where she was releasing "strong, anthemic, freeing" music, while also drawing on personal experiences and her past. She explained that due to tragedies in her early life, she does not like sad songs. Therefore, she did not want to release a sad song since she felt that she experienced enough "darkness". The song was released on April 2, 2021, with an accompanying music video directed by Jasper Soloff.

== Credits and personnel ==
Credits adapted from Spotify.

- Dove Cameron – vocals, songwriting
- Jonas Jeberg – songwriting, production
- Marcus Lomax – songwriting
- Melanie Joy Fontana – songwriting

== Music video ==
Singer-songwriter, Alexander 23, plays her love interest in the music video.

== Charts ==
Chart performance for "LazyBaby"
Chart (2021)	Peak position
New Zealand Hot Singles (RMNZ)	32

== Release history ==
Region	Date	Format	Label	Ref.
Various	April 2, 2021	Digital download; streaming	Disruptor; Columbia	
