= We Belong (Dove Cameron song) =

2020 single by Dove Cameron

Single by Dove Cameron
- Released: July 24, 2020
- Recorded: 2019
- Genre: Pop
- Length: 2:50
- Label: Disruptor; Columbia
- Songwriters: Dove Cameron; Casey Smith; Jesse Shatkin; Noonie Bao
- Producer: Jesse Shatkin

Dove Cameron singles chronology
"Remember Me" (2020)	"We Belong" (2020)	"LazyBaby" (2021)

"We Belong" is a song recorded by American singer Dove Cameron released by Disruptor and Columbia Records on July 24, 2020. Cameron has stated that the message of the song is about her dual mindset of being both an extreme romantic and an independent person, describing the track as a "reluctant love song". The song was later included on the soundtrack for the Netflix film After We Collided (2020).

After making "We Belong" in 2019, Cameron shelved it. However, she revisited it a year later, believing it was the beginning of the sound she wanted to continue to create. Despite being happy with the outcome of the song, she was initially insecure of her vocals on the upward riff included within the chorus, a riff that took her "ages" to master. Following the release of her 2022 breakthrough song "Boyfriend", "We Belong" was removed from streaming services.

== Composition and release ==
Speaking about the message behind the song, Cameron said in an interview with Sony Music that she is an "extreme romantic by nature, but also super independent by nature". She felt she does best when she is isolated and alone, but acknowledged that she wants a romantic connection in her life. She recognized the difficulty of the contrasting mindsets by incorporating it into "We Belong", which she described as a "reluctant love song". She hoped that listeners would take away the message that you can be in love whilst also being independent.

Speaking on the making of the song, Cameron recalled making it pre-COVID-19 pandemic in a producer's home studio. She felt that "We Belong" was reflective of her future releases, stating that previous singles were "broader" in terms of sound. With the release, Cameorn told Paper: "now that I feel like I've really started to tap into this sound, it's really exciting for me because I feel almost like I was walking, and now I feel like I'm running." Despite her happiness with the result of the song, Cameron was initially insecure of the vocals on the track due to the chorus containing an upward riff. At first, she found it difficult and it took her "ages" to be able to sing it with ease.

Cameron revealed to Genius that she shelved "We Belong" after recording it due to prioritising other releases. It was eventually released on July 24, 2020. Following its release, "We Belong" was included on the soundtrack for the Netflix film After We Collided. Cameron remarked that the song had gone on to become her most successful at that point in time, adding that she can never tell which songs will be popular.

== Music video ==
A music video was released for the song, directed by Luke Narim. It featured Cameron by herself in an Oscar de la Renta pink ball gown, travelling around a mansion. She wonders of nothing but her lover, checking to see if they have messaged her. Euphoria wrote that the choice to have her alone in the video may have been due to the COVID-19 pandemic, but deemed it an interesting choice regardless.

== Critical reception ==
Paper wrote that the song "has all the components of a strong pop hit".

== Credits and personnel ==
Credits adapted from Spotify.

- Dove Cameron – vocals, songwriting
- Casey Smith – songwriting
- Jesse Shatkin – songwriting, production
- Noonie Bao – songwriting

== Release history ==
Region	Date	Format	Label	Ref.
Various	July 24, 2020	Digital download; streaming	Disruptor; Columbia	
