= We Go Down Together =

2023 single by Dove Cameron and Khalid

Single by Dove Cameron and Khalid
- Released: February 10, 2023
- Genre: Pop
- Length: 3:04
- Label: Disruptor; Columbia
- Songwriters: Dove Cameron; Khalid Robinson; Connor McDonough; Riley McDonough; Ryan Daly; Lindsey Lomis
- Producers: Ryan Daly; Connor McDonough

Dove Cameron singles chronology
"Girl Like Me" (2022)	"We Go Down Together" (2023)	"Use Me (Brutal Hearts)" (2023)

Khalid singles chronology
"Not Alone" (2022)	"We Go Down Together" (2023)	"The Hard Way" (2023)

"We Go Down Together" is a song recorded by American singers Dove Cameron and Khalid, released by Disruptor and Columbia Records on February 10, 2023. A slow love ballad that marked a sonic shift for Cameron, she recruited Khalid to collaborate with her on the song, which she has expressed her gratitude for.

"We Go Down Together" was mostly well-received by critics, with magazines including Gay Times and V complimenting Cameron and Khalid's vocals together, while The Harvard Crimson criticized the lyrical content and production. The song charted in Canada and New Zealand.

== Composition and release ==
"We Go Down Together" is a slow love ballad. Euphoria magazine wrote that the song marked a sonic shift for Cameron, who, at the time of the song's release, had recently become known for songs such as "Boyfriend" and "Breakfast". Cameron stated that the choice to release different genres of music was intentional since she was exploring her sound for her forthcoming musical project. Speaking about it, she said: "I've been exploring different sonic palates as I write my debut album and finding new ways to give myself to my fans. This song and accompanying music video are like a little distilled love letter in a bottle. A song about a timeless love, the kind of love that makes you feel like you might be the only two people left on earth, and you wouldn't even notice."

Cameron first heard the song around 3am after a 15-hour studio session. She said: "It was this magical moment where it was the middle of the night, dead silent and pitch black outside, and it was the witching hour. They played me this song for the first time, and I was swooning, head over heels. It just felt so special." Shortly after recording her vocals for the track, she instantly thought of Khalid as a duet partner. Cameron told People.com: "He's a baby angel, the loveliest, nicest person you'll ever meet. He's just the warmest. I'm really, really lucky that he did this with me."

== Critical reception ==
The Gay Times wrote that "both artists’ styles blend seamlessly into the music video’s lush and atmospheric visuals". V magazine wrote that the "two powerhouse artists' voices perfectly compliment one another". Nmesoma Okechukwu of Euphoria agreed and felt the song stood out from other songs on the charts at the time of the song's release and hoped it would become a hit. However, Alessandro Drake of The Harvard Crimson was disappointed with the song. He felt that the songwriting was "subpar" and that the production on the verses of the track lacked. Drake also found Khalid's additions to the track unnecessary, believing that Cameron was capable of more alone, based o nof her previous releases. However, he appreciated the chorus and ending of "We Go Down Together", as well as Cameron's vocals.

== Credits and personnel ==
Credits adapted from Spotify.

- Dove Cameron – vocals, songwriting
- Khalid Robinson – vocals, songwriting
- Connor McDonough – songwriting, production
- Riley McDonough – songwriting
- Ryan Daly – songwriting, production
- Lindsey Lomis – songwriting

== Charts ==
Chart performance for "We Go Down Together"
Chart (2023)	Peak position
Canada Hot 100 (Billboard)	25
New Zealand Hot Singles (RMNZ)	7

== Release history ==
Region	Date	Format	Label	Ref.
Various	February 10, 2023	Digital download; streaming	Disruptor; Columbia	
