= Other Boys =

2023 song by Dove Cameron and Marshmello

Single by Marshmello and Dove Cameron
- Released: September 8, 2023
- Genre: Synth-pop; electropop
- Length: 2:17
- Label: Joytime Collective; Disruptor; Columbia
- Composers: Giselle Rosselli; Evan Blair; Christopher Comstock; Nicholas Gale; Everett Romano
- Lyricists: Giselle Rosselli; Dove Cameron; Grace Barker; Sarah "Solly" Solovay
- Producers: Christopher Comstock; Evan Blair

Marshmello singles chronology
"Tempo" (2023)	"Other Boys" (2023)	"Alcohol" (2023)

Dove Cameron singles chronology
"Use Me (Brutal Hearts)" (2023)	"Other Boys" (2023)	"Lethal Woman" (2023)

Lyric video
- "Other Boys" on YouTube

"Other Boys" is a song by American producer Marshmello and American singer Dove Cameron, released on September 8, 2023, by Joytime Collective via Disruptor Records and Columbia Records. A synth-pop and electropop track, it samples the song "Crave You", written by Australian singer-songwriter Giselle Rosselli for the Australian electronic producer duo Flight Facilities.

== Music video ==
An official animated lyric video was released on YouTube on September 8, 2023. The video depicts Cameron riding a motorcycle around the metropolis of Manhattan at night in a noir-ish retro video game aesthetic.

== Track listings ==
- Streaming/digital download
1. "Other Boys" – 2:17
- Streaming/digital download – San Pacho Remix
1. "Other Boys" (San Pacho Remix) – 2:36
- Streaming/digital download – Guz Remix
1. "Other Boys" (Guz Remix) – 2:43
- Streaming/digital download – Chapter & Verse Remix
1. "Other Boys" (Chapter & Verse Remix) – 2:58

== Charts ==
=== Weekly charts ===
Weekly chart performance for "Other Boys"
Chart (2023–2024)	Peak position
Belarus Airplay (TopHit)	18
CIS Airplay (TopHit)	26
Czech Republic Airplay (ČNS IFPI)	15
Kazakhstan Airplay (TopHit)	6
Latvia Airplay (TopHit)	12
Lithuania Airplay (TopHit)	84
New Zealand Hot Singles (RMNZ)	17
Russia Airplay (TopHit)	18
South Korea BGM (Circle)	149
US Hot Dance/Electronic Songs (Billboard)	9

=== Monthly charts ===
Monthly chart performance for "Other Boys"
Chart (2023–2024)	Peak position
Belarus Airplay (TopHit)	20
CIS Airplay (TopHit)	36
Czech Republic (Rádio – Top 100)	29
Kazakhstan Airplay (TopHit)	16
Latvia Airplay (TopHit)	14
Lithuania Airplay (TopHit)	95
Russia Airplay (TopHit)	28

=== Year-end charts ===
2023 year-end chart performance for "Other Boys"
Chart (2023)	Position
Latvia Airplay (TopHit)	193

2024 year-end chart performance for "Other Boys"
Chart (2024)	Position
Belarus Airplay (TopHit)	50
CIS Airplay (TopHit)	70
Kazakhstan Airplay (TopHit)	31
Russia Airplay (TopHit)	54
US Hot Dance/Electronic Songs (Billboard)	73
