= Whatever You Like (Dove Cameron song) =

2025 single by Dove Cameron

Single by Dove Cameron
- Released: September 19, 2025
- Genre: Ballad
- Length: 2:56
- Label: Disruptor; Columbia
- Songwriters: Dove Cameron; Madison Love; Tyler Spry; Victoria Zaro
- Producer: Tyler Spry

Dove Cameron singles chronology
"Romeo" (2025)	"Whatever You Like" (2025)	"Hello My Old Lover" (2025)

Visualizer
- "Whatever You Like" on YouTube

"Whatever You Like" is a song recorded by American singer Dove Cameron. It was released by Disruptor and Columbia Records on September 19, 2025. After performing the song for the first time in April 2025 at an online gig, she began teasing the release of the song in August of that year.

The lyrical content of the song explores Cameron's relationship with Italian singer Damiano David and finally realizing the feeling of true love after being in previous loveless relationships. She stated the song is about the "first good man [she has] ever loved". Billboard noted the difference between "Whatever You Like" and previous works of Cameron, describing it as "a simple, sweet love song".

== Background ==
In April 2025, Cameron headlined "Everything Must Go", an online, live gig where viewers could buy memorabilia from her life and career. The livestream was to raise funds for the National Alliance on Mental Illness (NAMI). The setlist for the gig included "Whatever You Like", marking it as both the first time fans had heard the song, as well as the first time Cameron had performed it.

== Composition and release ==
Cameron, who has been in a relationship with Damiano David since 2023, wrote the song in 2024 about the "first good man [she has] ever loved". She confirmed it was the second song she had written about him, hinting the first one would be included within her debut album, Final Girl (2026). Cameron also explained that "Whatever You Like" is about the realization that despite being in previous relationships, she had not truly known love before. The lyrics explore the couple's love in its "simplest and truest form" and finding "the person you want to do every little thing with for the rest of your life".

Billboard magazine noted the difference between the track and the three singles released prior to it, "Too Much", "French Girls" and "Romeo". They wrote: "after a series of releases in which she takes every opportunity to challenge convention, Dove Cameron is ready to give her fans a simple, sweet love song". However, they appreciated that Cameron was still delving into her "cheeky, winking wordplay". They complimented the lyric "you've got my ear like Van Gogh", which they described as "an out of nowhere bar".

Although initially marketed as a single from her debut album, it was later omitted from the final track listing upon the release of Final Girl. Cameron later stated that she did not resonate with the song when she was assembling the track listing for the album, feeling that it was not confessional enough for the body of work.

== Credits and personnel ==
Credits adapted from Spotify.

- Dove Cameron – vocals, songwriting
- Madison Love – songwriting
- Tyler Spry – production, songwriting
- Victoria Zaro – songwriting
- Tom Norris – mixing engineer
- Dale Becker – mastering engineer

== Release history ==
Region	Date	Format	Label	Ref.
Various	September 19, 2025	Digital download; streaming	Disruptor; Columbia	

== Charts ==
=== Weekly charts ===
Weekly chart performance
Chart (2025–26)	Peak position
Czech Republic Airplay (ČNS IFPI)	44
Lithuania Airplay (TopHit)	69

=== Monthly charts ===
Monthly chart performance
Chart (2025)	Peak position
Lithuania Airplay (TopHit)	84
