= Curry Sicong Tian =

Chinese film director and writer

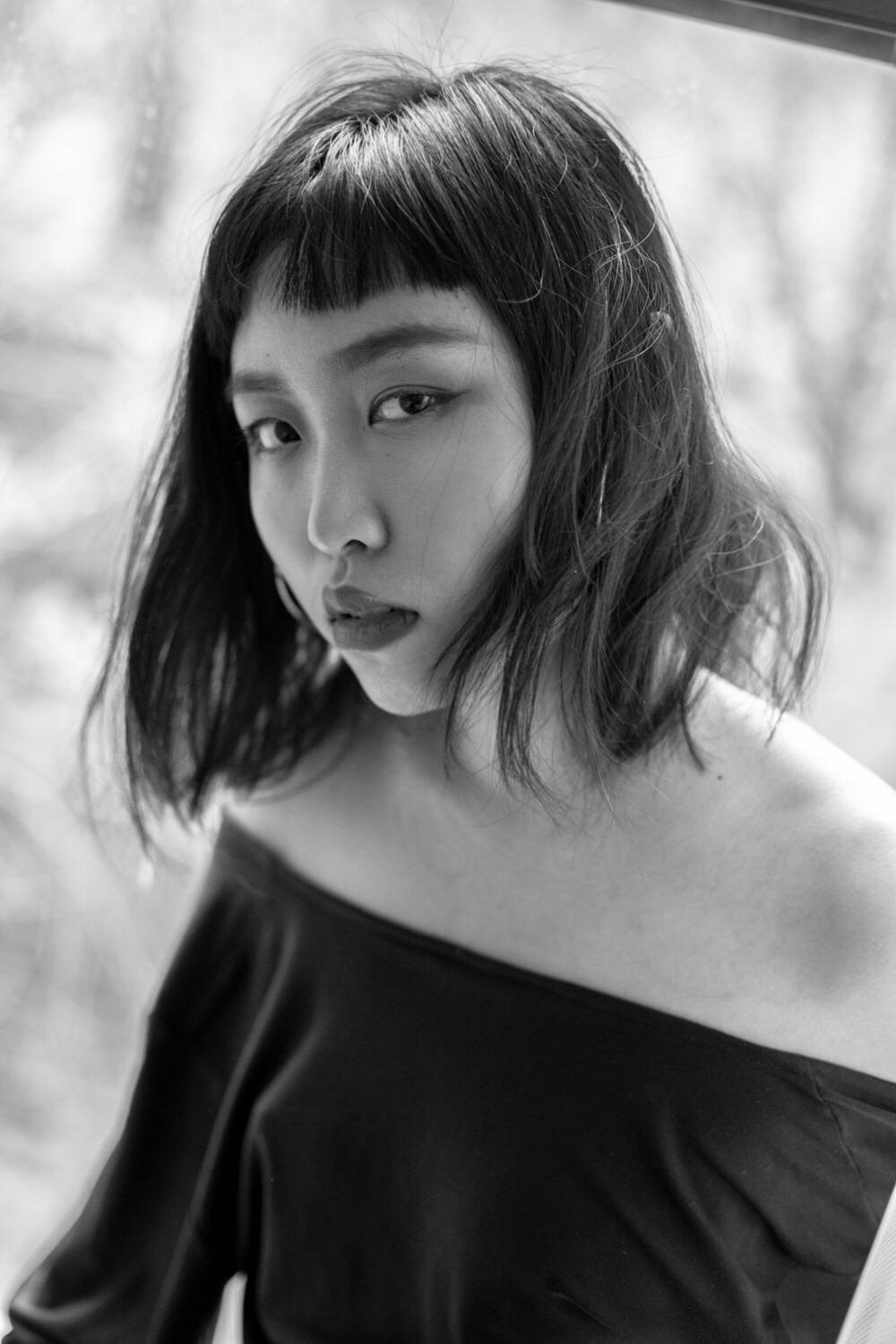
- Born: China
- Occupation(s): Director, Writer, Visual artist
- Years active: 2019–present
- Website: currytian.com

Curry Sicong Tian is a Chinese film director, writer and multidisciplinary artist based in Los Angeles. She won Student Academy Award for her short film, Simulacra, in 2020.

== Life and career ==
Curry was born and raised in China. She holds an MFA in animation and digital art from the University of Southern California and a degree from Tsinghua University in Visual Communication Design. She has directed commercials for Mercedes-Benz, Beats Electronics and Canon Inc.

== Filmography ==
Year	Title	Contribution	Note
2022	Chanel X Nowness - The Myth Of Five	Director	Short film
2021	CC is Dreaming: Voices in My Head	Director	Video short
2021	Mithridate	Art director	Fashion film
2020	Simulacra	Director, writer, editor and animator	Short film
2020	Mukbang Roller	Director	Video short
2019	Eisa, Hlin and Darling Blue	Director and writer	Short film
2018	Flat Echo	Animator	Short film

== Awards and nominations ==
Year	Result	Award	Category	Work	Ref.
2021	Nominated	First Look, USA	First Look Industry Award	Simulacra	
2020	Won	Los Angeles Animation Festival	Best Visual Effects	Simulacra	
2020	Won	Student Academy Awards	Gold Medal	Simulacra	
