= Out of Touch (Dove Cameron song) =

2019 single by Dove Cameron

Single by Dove Cameron
- Released: December 6, 2019
- Recorded: March–April 2018
- Genre: Pop rock
- Length: 3:15
- Label: Disruptor; Columbia
- Composer(s): Dallas Koehlke; Jeff Halavacs; John Thomas Roach; Kevin Robert Fisher
- Lyricist(s): Dove Cameron; Lisa Scinta; Steph Jones
- Producer(s): DallasK; Halatrax

Dove Cameron singles chronology
"So Good" (2019)	"Out of Touch" (2019)	"Remember Me" (2020)

Music video
- "Out of Touch" on YouTube

"Out of Touch" is a song by American singer Dove Cameron, released on December 6, 2019, through Disruptor and Columbia.

== Background ==
Cameron announced the song's release on December 2, 2019, by posting a picture on social media of a file titled "Out of Touch Explicit (Mastered)" with the caption "12/6". She teased the song the following day posting a picture on social media with handwritten lyrics of the song. Cameron called the song "One of her favourite tracks she has done so far". It was one of the first songs she recorded for her "new music era".

== Composition ==
"Out of Touch" is a pop-rock song above a "mellow, mid-tempo guitar riff". The song was written in the key of B major with a tempo of 80 beats per minute. The song is about Cameron "recovering from a tiff with her lover and how she hopes to reconcile" and "wanting this person to keep being honest with her, even when she doesn't handle it well".

== Music video ==
The music video accompanied the song's release. It sees Cameron singing to the camera on a rooftop with a city setting in the background. At the end of the video, Cameron runs into the arms of her partner Thomas Doherty.

== Credits and personnel ==
Credits adapted from Tidal.

- Dove Cameron – songwriting, vocals
- DallasK – songwriting, production
- Halatrax – songwriting, production
- John Thomas Roach – songwriting
- Kevin Robert Fisher – songwriting
- Lisa Scinta – songwriting
- Steph Jones – songwriting
- Keith Parry – assistant engineering
- Chris Gehringer – mastering
- Erik Madrid – mixing
- Jenna Andrews – recording

== Release history ==
Region	Date	Format	Label	Ref.
Various	December 6, 2019	Digital download; streaming	Disruptor; Columbia	
