= Waste (Dove Cameron song) =

2019 song by Dove Cameron

Single by Dove Cameron
- A-side: "Bloodshot"
- Released: September 27, 2019
- Genre: Pop
- Length: 3:29
- Label: Disruptor; Columbia
- Songwriter(s): Dove Cameron; Chloe Angelides; Delacey; Ingrid Andress; Jonas Jeberg
- Producer(s): Jeberg

Dove Cameron singles chronology
| "Bloodshot" (2019) | "Waste" (2019) | "So Good" (2019) |

Music video
- "Waste" on YouTube

"Waste" is a song by American singer Dove Cameron, released on September 27, 2019, by Disruptor and Columbia. The song was released alongside "Bloodshot".

== Background and release ==
Cameron hinted at releasing new music in September in an interview with E! News in August 2019. She later confirmed that she would be releasing music at the end of September on September 23, 2019, via her social media. She formally announced the release of both "Bloodshot" and "Waste" on September 25, 2019. It was released on September 27, 2019.

Cameron told Rolling Stone: "'Waste' has always felt extremely special to me, It was always the one that grabbed me the most. It is probably the weirdest one; the production is definitely strange. I love that it's a love song without being a really melty, drippy."

She said to Billboard: "'Waste' is very much about that feeling of being so fucked-up over someone that you just want to waste yourself on them, bleed out every ounce of you and live inside them. That kind of agonizing, pain/pleasure, mad love is what we all either know personally, or want. Obviously, I am in a very public relationship [with Descendants costar Thomas Doherty], so it's safe to assume most love songs are about him."

== Critical reception ==
Brittany Spanos of Rolling Stone called the track a "dreamy, rock-tinged love song".

== Music video ==
The accompanying music video was released on September 27, 2019.

== Personnel ==
Credits adapted from Tidal.

- Jonas Jeberg – production, songwriting
- Chloe Angelides – songwriting
- Delacey – songwriting
- Dove Cameron – vocals, songwriting
- Ingrid Andress – songwriting
- Melissa Hayes – assistant engineer
- Chris Gehringer – mastering
- Mike Malchicoff – mixing
- Dan Book – recording

== Release history ==
| Region | Date | Format | Label | Ref. |
|---|---|---|---|---|
| Various | September 27, 2019 | Digital download; streaming | Disruptor; Columbia | |
