= Girl Like Me (Dove Cameron song) =

2022 single by Dove Cameron

Single by Dove Cameron
- Released: December 9, 2022
- Length: 2:29
- Label: Disruptor; Columbia
- Songwriters: Dove Cameron; Evan Blair; Lowell; Edwyn Collins
- Producer: Evan Blair

Dove Cameron singles chronology
"Bad Idea" (2022)	"Girl Like Me" (2022)	"We Go Down Together" (2023)

"Girl Like Me" is a song recorded by American singer Dove Cameron released by Disruptor and Columbia Records on December 9, 2022. The song samples "A Girl Like You" by Edwyn Collins and was inspired by its inclusion in Charlie's Angels: Full Throttle (2003). Cameron had thought about covering the song live, but instead opted to create her own version of the song with the narrative flipped and a club-sounding twist.

== Composition and release ==
Cameron had been a fan of "A Girl Like You" by Edwyn Collins since seeing Charlie's Angels: Full Throttle (2003) when she was seven. She said: "When I saw that scene in Charlie's Angels, when she's laying in front of a fire and you find out that she's a villain and it's playing 'A Girl Like You,' I was arrested. I was nailed to the floor as a 7-year-old, and I've always loved it." She had an idea to cover it for a tour, but eventually wanted to make her own version of the song with the narrative flipped to her being the girl in the song. Cameron also wanted a "more synth-y, club future sound" for "Girl Like Me". She added that she could imagine the song playing in a slow-motion fight scene in an action film.

Cameron co-wrote the song with Lowell and frequent collaborator Evan Blair, the latter of whom also produced it. Writing credits were also given to Edwyn Collins. Dork wrote that the lyrics of the song "showcases Dove's perspective on gender roles and power dynamics within relationships". Stereogum called it a "crunchy, guitar-powered single". Cameron debuted the song at the 2022 KIIS-FM Jingle Ball, before eventually releasing it on December 9, 2022.

== Credits and personnel ==
Credits adapted from Spotify.

- Dove Cameron – vocals, songwriting
- Evan Blair – songwriting, production
- Lowell – songwriting
- Edwyn Collins – songwriting
- Alex Ghenea – mixing engineer
- Dale Becker – mastering engineer

== Release history ==
Region	Date	Format	Label	Ref.
Various	December 9, 2022	Digital download; streaming	Disruptor; Columbia	
