= The Girl and the Dreamcatcher =

American pop duo

- Also known as: TGATDC
- Origin: Los Angeles, California, U.S.
- Genres: Pop
- Years active: 2014–2016
- Label: GDC
- Past members: Dove Cameron; Ryan McCartan
- Website: thegirlandthedreamcatcher.com

The Girl and the Dreamcatcher was an American pop duo from Los Angeles that consisted of Liv and Maddie co-stars/former couple Dove Cameron ("the Girl") and Ryan McCartan ("the Dreamcatcher"). Their debut EP, Negatives, was released on July 29, 2016.

== History ==
Cameron and McCartan created a YouTube channel in July 2014, posting covers of various songs. Their first video, a cover of "At Last I See the Light", was released the following day. In May 2015, Cameron announced that the two had formed a band and were set to release their first original song. In September 2015, they announced their band name, the Girl and the Dreamcatcher, and that their first single, "Written in the Stars", would be released on October 2, 2015. On December 2, 2015, the band released a cover of the song "All I Want for Christmas Is You" by Mariah Carey, followed by a cover of Frank Sinatra's version of "Have Yourself a Merry Little Christmas" six days later, on December 8, 2015.

In January 2016, Cameron and McCartan announced that their next single, titled "Glowing in the Dark", would be released on January 29, 2016. On April 8, 2016, the band released their song "Someone You Like", the acoustic version of which was first released on their YouTube channel in 2014. On June 16, 2016, the music video for their next single, "Make You Stay", was exclusively released on People, followed by the song's official release the next day.

In May 2016, the band announced that they would be releasing their first EP, titled Negatives, with a release date set for July 29, 2016. New songs were released daily leading up to the EP's official release – "My Way" on July 25, "Monster" on July 26, "Cry Wolf" on July 27, and "Gladiator" on July 28. The EP also includes two of their previous singles, "Glowing in the Dark" and "Make You Stay".

In October 2016, McCartan announced the breakup of the band, as well as the breakup of his and Cameron's relationship, stating: "Dove has decided this relationship isn't what she wants." However, he stated that the two still love each other very much and told their fans to "be sensitive, as this is painful." Cameron also released a statement that stated: "Thank you for your support & full hearts in this very intense & human time. There's a lot love between Ryan & I. Life is beautiful & long."

In August 2017, ABC News bought the rights to the "Glowing in the Dark" song and played the song as an overarching theme to cover their report of a solar eclipse. They have used the song since.

== Discography ==
=== Extended play ===
List of extended plays, with selected chart positions
Title	EP details	Peak chart
Title	EP details	US Heat.
Negatives	Release: July 29, 2016; Label: GDC Records; Formats: Digital download	10

=== Singles ===
Title	Year	Album
"Written in the Stars"	2015	Non-album single
"Glowing in the Dark"	2016	Negatives
"Make You Stay"	2016	Negatives

=== Promotional singles ===
Title	Year	Album
"All I Want for Christmas Is You"	2015	Non-album singles
"Have Yourself a Merry Little Christmas"	2015	Non-album singles
"Someone You Like"	2016	Non-album singles
"My Way"	2016	Negatives
"Monster"	2016	Negatives
"Cry Wolf"	2016	Negatives
"Gladiator"	2016	Negatives

=== Music videos ===
Title	Year	Director
"Written in the Stars"	2015	Colton Tran
"All I Want for Christmas Is You"	2015	
"Have Yourself a Merry Little Christmas"	2015	
"Glowing in the Dark"	2016	Colton Tran
"Make You Stay"	2016	Colton Tran
