= So Good (Dove Cameron song) =

2019 song by Dove Cameron

Single by Dove Cameron
- Released: November 1, 2019
- Length: 2:37
- Label: Disruptor; Columbia
- Songwriter(s): Ariel Rechtshaid; Dove Cameron; Julia Michaels; Justin Tranter; Tommy King
- Producer(s): Ariel Rechtshaid

Dove Cameron singles chronology
"Waste" (2019)	"So Good" (2019)	"Out of Touch" (2019)

Music video
- "So Good" on YouTube

"So Good" is a song by American singer, Dove Cameron. It was released through Disruptor and Columbia on November 1, 2019.

== Background ==
In an interview with Entertainment Tonight, Dove Cameron stated that the track was "one of [her] favorite songs that [she's] done". Cameron also described the song as a "feel good track with an edge".

== Critical reception ==
Mike Nied from Idolator wrote that "There's something so euphoric about how she wholeheartedly embraces the feel-good vibes that is bound to speak to listeners", and that the song was "Relatable and gorgeously produced".

== Music video ==
The music video for the song was released on the same day as the track. The video displays Cameron on a rotating platform for the duration of the video, while Cameron is decorated in a variety of flowers using prosthetic glue. As the video progresses, each look builds off of one another as Cameron is covered in more florals.

In February 2022, this music video was deleted from her YouTube channel, along with all other songs Cameron had released prior to Boyfriend.

=== Reception ===
Writing for Entertainment Tonight, Zach Seemayer described the video as "mature, ethereal and surreal".

=== Appearances ===
The song makes an appearance in the 2020 film After We Collided. Another song of Cameron's, "We Belong", was used for the film's trailer.

== Release history ==
Region	Date	Format	Label	Ref.
Various	November 1, 2019	Digital download; streaming	Disruptor; Columbia	
