= Liv and Maddie: Music from the TV Series =

2015 soundtrack album

Liv and Maddie

Soundtrack album by Dove Cameron
- Released: March 17, 2015
- Recorded: 2013–2015
- Genre: Power pop; pop rock
- Length: 45:52
- Label: Walt Disney
- Producer: Bardur Haberg

Dove Cameron chronology
Liv and Maddie (2015)	Alchemical: Volume 1 (2023)

Liv and Maddie (Music from the TV Series) is a soundtrack to the Disney Channel series Liv and Maddie. It features 12 songs performed by Dove Cameron, and a song performed by Jordan Fisher. The soundtrack was released on March 17, 2015 by Walt Disney Records.

== Promotional singles ==
"On Top of the World" by Imagine Dragons was released as the first promotional single from the soundtrack, by Walt Disney Records on August 27, 2013. "Better in Stereo", was released as the second promotional single by Walt Disney Records on October 15, 2013. A music video was filmed and aired on Disney Channel the night of October 29, 2013. "Count Me In" was released as third promotional single on June 3, 2014. "You, Me and the Beat" was released as fourth promotional single on December 2, 2014. "What a Girl Is" featuring Christina Grimmie and Baby Kaely, was released on March 5, 2015 as the fifth and final promotional single.

== Track listing ==
No.	Title	Writer(s)	Producer(s)	Length
1.	"Better in Stereo" (Liv and Maddie Theme Song)	Bardur Haberg; Oli Jogvansson; Molly Kaye; Paula Winger	Bardur Haberg	2:34
2.	"What a Girl Is"	Mitch Allan; Nikki Leonti		2:53
3.	"Say Hey"	Charity Daw; Josh Edmondson; Sam Hollander		2:52
4.	"As Long as I Have You"	Gannin Arnold; Andy Dodd; Adam Watts		3:46
5.	"What a Girl Is" (featuring Christina Grimmie and Baby Kaely)	Allan; Leonti		3:18
6.	"True Love" (Piano Duet) (with Jordan Fisher)	Anders; Astrom; Peiken		1:16
7.	"You, Me and the Beat"	Rock Mafia; Adam Schmalholz; Thomas Armato Sturges		3:11
8.	"True Love"	Adam Anders; Peer Astrom; Shelly Peiken		3:14
9.	"Count Me In"	Toby Gad; Lindy Robbins		2:56
10.	"On Top of the World"	Alexander Grant; Benjamin McKee; Daniel Reynolds; Daniel Sermon		3:03
11.	"Better in Stereo" (Single Version)	Haberg; Jogvansson; Kaye; Winger		3:03
12.	"Froyo Yolo"	Eric Peter Goldman; Ron Hart		2:16
13.	"True Love" (Ballad) (performed by Jordan Fisher)	Anders; Astrom; Peiken		3:31
Total length:				45:52

== Charts ==
Chart (2015)	Peak position
U.S. Billboard 200	180
U.S. Top Heatseekers	16
U.S. Kid Albums	3
