= Bloodshot (song) =

2019 song by Dove Cameron

Single by Dove Cameron
- B-side: "Waste"
- Released: September 27, 2019
- Genre: Synth-pop; alt-pop
- Length: 2:59
- Label: Disruptor; Columbia
- Songwriter(s): Dove Cameron; Carly Paige Waldrip; Downtown Trevor Brown; William Zaire Simmons
- Producer(s): The Orphanage

Dove Cameron singles chronology
"Bloodshot" (2019)	"Waste" (2019)

Music video
- "Bloodshot" on YouTube

"Bloodshot" is the debut single by American singer Dove Cameron, released on September 27, 2019, by Disruptor and Columbia Records, alongside its B-side, "Waste".

== Background and release ==
Cameron hinted at releasing new music in September in an interview with E! News in August 2019. She later confirmed that she would be releasing music at the end of September on September 23, 2019, via her social media. She formally announced the release of both "Bloodshot" and "Waste" on September 25, 2019. It was released on September 27, 2019.

Cameron described the song to Billboard, saying: "'Bloodshot' is less specific. I am very known by my label to say 'I hate a breakup song,' which I don't anticipate changing anytime soon. To me, they're boring and they make me itchy. What I love about 'Bloodshot' is that it's not necessarily about a breakup, but it is definitely about a loss of some kind. For me, it's about loss, which I am always trying to put to lyrics."

== Critical reception ==
Billie Nilles from E! News complimented the song, saying "with its woozy synths and haunted vocal, that stands out as our favorite".

== Music video ==
The song's music video was released on October 8, 2019.

== Personnel ==
Credits adapted from Tidal.

- The Orphanage – production
- Carly Paige Waldrip – songwriting
- Dove Cameron – vocals, songwriting
- "Downtown" Trevor Brown – songwriting
- William Zaire Simmons – songwriting
- Melissa Hayes – assistant engineer
- Chris Gehringer – mastering
- Mike Malchicoff – mixing

== Release history ==
Region	Date	Format	Label	Ref.
Various	September 27, 2019	Digital download; streaming	Disruptor; Columbia	
