= Remember Me (Dove Cameron song) =

2020 single by Dove Cameron

Single by Dove Cameron featuring Bia
- Released: April 10, 2020
- Length: 3:44
- Label: Disruptor; Columbia
- Songwriters: Dove Cameron; Bia; Sean Douglas; Madison Love; Joe Khajadourian; Alex Schwartz
- Producer: The Futuristics

Dove Cameron singles chronology
| "Out of Touch" (2019) | "Remember Me" (2020) | "We Belong" (2020) |

Bia singles chronology
| "Perfect (Remix)" (2020) | "Remember Me" (2020) | "Free Bia (1st Day Out)" (2020) |

"Remember Me" is a song recorded by American singer Dove Cameron featuring rapper Bia, released by Disruptor and Columbia Records on April 10, 2020. Released as part of a string of singles by Cameron, the song is based around the high and low points of a relationship and wanting to "freeze a picture-perfect moment in time with her partner".

"Remember Me" was one of the first songs Cameron had written for her post-Disney Channel music career and it remained unreleased for two years. The song "finally clicked" for Cameron when she received Bia's verse for the track. It marked her first collaboration, an intentional decision so that her introductory sound could not be misconceived. Following the release of her 2022 breakthrough song "Boyfriend", "Remember Me" was removed from streaming services.

== Composition and release ==
Cameron wrote the song as a response to feeling like life is "about things coming to an end". She explained: "We live in a sort of constant state of mourning over the things that we love, but are always leaving us, or always dying, or always venting, and 'Remember Me' is a bit of an expression of that. It's a bit of a, 'I will only be this beautiful, this young, this healthy, this vibrant right now, and will never be more beautiful and in my prime than I am right now.' And while I'm aware of that, I also know that it's ending and that this is fleeting."

In an interview with MTV, Cameron said that the message of "Remember Me" is "time's ticking, so enjoy me as I am now." She was happy with the sound of "Remember Me", stating that listeners "get transported somewhere; I feel like it's a rainy night in Tokyo or New York. [...] The sun's just coming up and you've been out all night on a bender." Cameron first hinted towards the song's release when she played it on an Instagram livestream in March 2020. It was eventually released on April 10, 2020. At the time of its release, the song was almost two years old and marked one of the first songs Cameron had written for her post-Disney Channel music career. It was not initially intended to be a collaboration, but Cameron felt the song "finally clicked" when rapper Bia submitted a verse for it. She said: "Her vocal quality happens to be such a fucking match for the song. When I heard her rasp, I was so sold immediately on her. She fits the fantasy of the song, and I can't imagine it without the feature now." It marked her first collaboration, which was intentional, as she did not want to "get colored by anybody else as she began to release her own music and introduce herself as an artist".

== Critical reception ==
PopSugar described "Remember Me" as a "beautifully descriptive song about love". The BBC complimented Cameron on the lyric "Please remember me like this / Beautiful and talking shit", describing it as a "great lyric".

== Credits and personnel ==
Credits adapted from Spotify.

- Dove Cameron – vocals, songwriting
- Bia – vocals, songwriting
- Sean Douglas – songwriting
- Madison Love – songwriting
- Joe Khajadourian – songwriting, production
- Alex Schwartz – songwriting, production

== Release history ==
| Region | Date | Format | Label | Ref. |
|---|---|---|---|---|
| Various | April 10, 2020 | Digital download; streaming | Disruptor; Columbia | |
