= Delacey =

American singer and songwriter (born 1993)

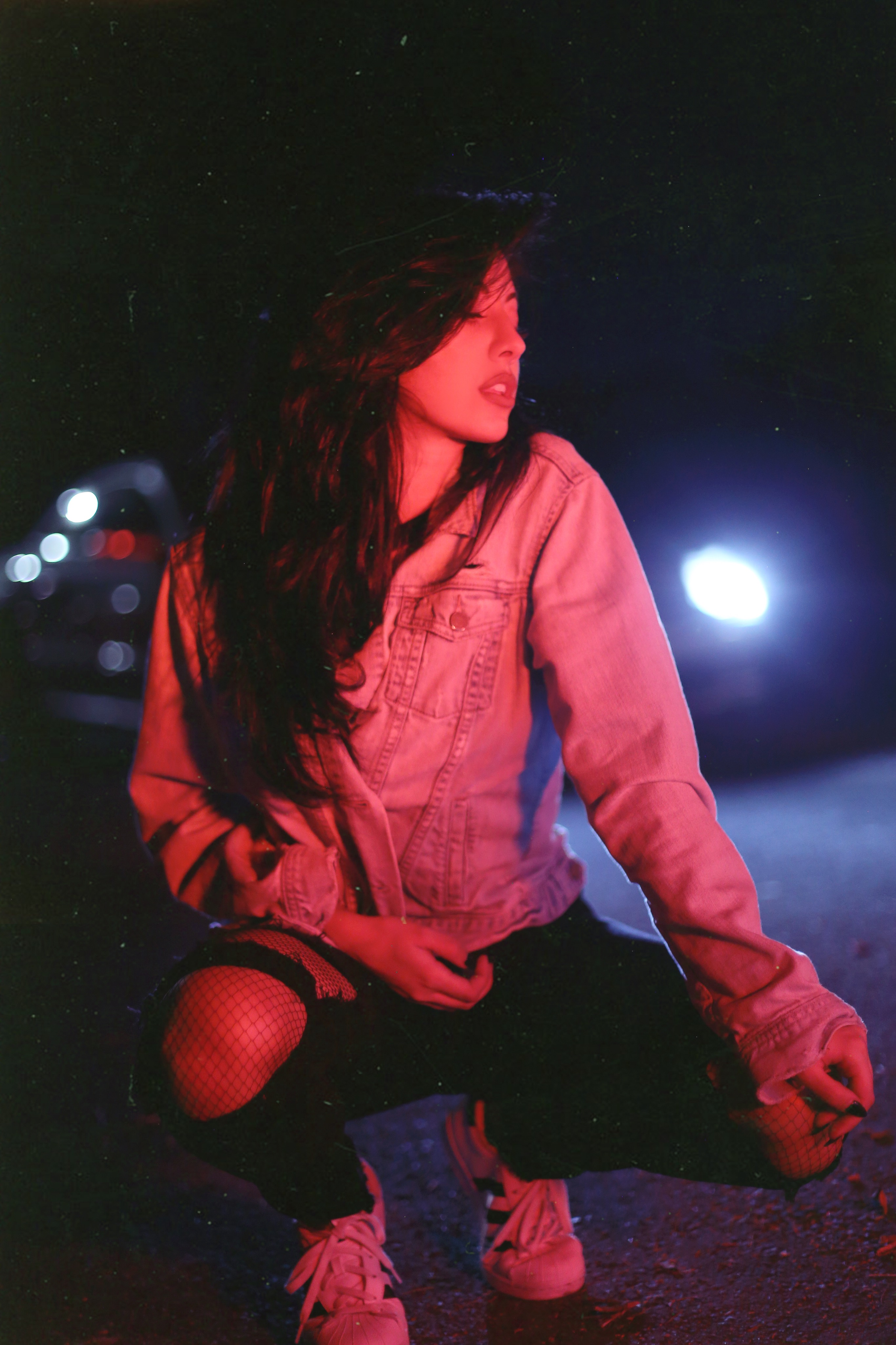
- Delacey in 2016

Background information
- Also known as: Delacey
- Born: Brittany Marie Amaradio; December 14, 1993 (age 32)
- Origin: San Juan Capistrano, California
- Occupation: Singer-songwriter
- Label: Hitco
- Website: www.delaceymusic.com

Brittany Marie Amaradio (born 14 December 1993), known professionally as Delacey, is an American singer and songwriter. Having co-written songs such as "New York City" for The Chainsmokers, "Ruin the Friendship" for Demi Lovato, "Ruin My Life" by Zara Larsson, and "Without Me" for Halsey (which reached number one on the Billboard Hot 100), in March 2020, she released her debut album, Black Coffee. She released her second album, The Girl Has A Dream, in 2023 featuring the single "Boy With The Blues."

In 2024, Delacey co-wrote two songs for the animated motion picture The Wild Robot, "Kiss the Sky" and "Even When I'm Not" both performed by Maren Morris. "Kiss the Sky" was met with critical acclaim, winning a Hollywood Music In Media Award for Best Original Song, and earning nominations for the Astra Awards, Critics' Choice Awards, and Golden Globe Awards. Delacey, along with Jane Zhang, have both collaborated with Huawei to release the company theme song "Dream It Possible".

== Early life ==
Delacey was born in an Italian family and raised in San Juan Capistrano in Orange County, California. Picking up the piano and songwriting at seven years old, Delacey cites her early influences as Stevie Nicks and Billie Holiday, a taste she acquired from her father's vinyl collection. Upon graduating from Capistrano Valley High School, Amaradio briefly moved to Manhattan where she worked as a photographer by day and worked open mics at night. During this time, she wrote "New York City" about her struggles in New York. Upon returning to the West Coast, she adopted the pseudonym "Delacey."

== Discography ==
=== Studio albums ===
List of albums, with selected details
Title	Details
Black Coffee	Released: March 27, 2020; Label: Hitco, Delicate Flower; Format: Digital download, streaming
The Girl Has a Dream	Released: June 30, 2023; Label: Photo Finish Records; Format: Digital download, streaming, LP

=== Collaborative albums ===
List of collaborative albums, with selected details
Title	Album details
Honeymooners (with Valley Boy)	Released: May 17, 2024; Label: Honeymooners; Formats: Digital download, streaming, LP

=== Singles ===
==== As lead artist ====
List of singles as lead artist, with selected chart positions, showing year released and album name
Title	Year	Peak chart positions		Album
Title	Year	US Pop	US Adult Pop	Album
"My Man"	2019	37	33	Black Coffee
"The Subway Song"	2019	—	—	Black Coffee
"No One's Gonna Ever Love U"	2019	—	—	Black Coffee
"Cruel Intentions" (with G-Eazy)	2020	—	—	Black Coffee
"Black Coffee"	2020	—	—	Black Coffee
"Chapel"	2020	—	—	Black Coffee
"Unlovable"	2020	—	—	Black Coffee
"Boy with the Blues"	2021	—	—	Non-album singles
"Drama Queen"	2021	—	—	Non-album singles
"Manly Man" (with Emily Weisband)	2022	—	—	Non-album singles
"Man on the Moon"	2023	—	—	The Girl Has a Dream
"One Mississippi"	2023	—	—	The Girl Has a Dream
"The End"	2023	—	—	The Girl Has a Dream
"Things I'd Save In A Fire"	2023	—	—	The Girl Has a Dream
"Drive Baby" (with Valley Boy)	2023	—	—	Honeymooners
"God Is a Giver" (with Valley Boy)	2024	—	—	Honeymooners
"Someone's Gotta Be The Last" (with Valley Boy)	2024	—	—	Honeymooners
"Same Song Forever" (with Valley Boy)	2024	—	—	Honeymooners
"Let's Get Married" (with Valley Boy)	2024	—	—	Honeymooners
"Trouble"	2024	—	—	Non-album single
"French Toast"	2024	—	—	Non-album single

==== As featured artist ====
List of singles as featured artist, with selected chart positions, showing year released and album name
Title	Year	Peak chart positions	Album
Title	Year	US Dance Digital	Album
"Destiny" (Markus Schulz featuring DeLacey)	2015	—	Watch the World
"In the Air Tonight" (Alex Midi featuring Delacey)	2016	50	Non-album singles
"Walls" (Wingtip featuring Delacey)	2017	—	Non-album singles
"In the Air Tonight (Rework Mix)" (Alex Midi, CIC and Kohen featuring Delacey)	2019	—	Non-album singles

==== Promotional singles ====
List of songs, showing year released and album name
Title	Year	Album
"Emily"	2019	Black Coffee
"Actress"	2019	Black Coffee
"Everything You Need to Know About Me Today"	2021	The Girl Has a Dream

=== Music videos ===
==== As lead artist ====
List of music videos as lead artist, showing year released and directors
Title	Year	Director(s)
"My Man"	2019	Jessie Hill
"The Subway Song"	2019	—N/a
"No One's Gonna Ever Love U"	2020	—N/a
"Cruel Intentions" (with G-Eazy)	2020	—N/a
"Black Coffee"	2020	—N/a
"Chapel"	2020	Chandler Lass
"Damn"	2020	—N/a
"Break Up Slow Dance" (Live Studio Session) (with Valley Boy)	2020	Zach Johnston
"Unlovable"	2020	Aysia Marotta
"Everything You Need to Know About Me Today"	2021	Spencer Leonard
"Boy with the Blues"	2021	Danica Kleinknecht
"Drama Queen"	2021	Harper Smith

==== As featured artist ====
List of music videos as a featured artist, showing year released and directors
Title	Year	Director(s)
"Destiny" (Markus Schulz featuring DeLacey)	2015	Daniel Kaufman
"In the Air Tonight" (Alex Midi featuring Delacey)	2016	—N/a

=== Songwriting credits ===
Title	Year	Artist(s)	Album	Written with
"New York City"	2015	The Chainsmokers	Bouquet	Andrew Taggart
"Fool's Gold" (featuring Børns)	2016	Dagny	Ultraviolet EP	Dagny, Børns, Tommy English
"Aww"	2017	Baby Ariel	Non-album single	Madison Love, Thomas Eriksen
"Ruin the Friendship"	2017	Demi Lovato	Tell Me You Love Me	Demi Lovato, Chloe Angelides, Ido Zmishlany
"First Love" (featuring Sabrina Carpenter)	2017	Lost Kings	We Are Lost Kings	Lost Kings, Albin Nedler, Kristoffer Fogelmark, Rami Yacoub
"Sugarcoat"	2018	Jaira Burns	Burn Slow EP	Jaira Burns, Sizzy Rocket, ADP, Brittany Mullen
"Without Me"	2018	Halsey	Manic	Halsey, Louis Bell, Amy Allen, Justin Timberlake, Timbaland, Scott Storch
"That Feeling When"	2018	Dagny	Non-album single	Dagny, Tommy English
"Bad Guy"	2018	Niykee Heaton	Starting Over	Alex Schwartz, Jay Jay, Joe Khajadourian
"Anti-Everything" (with Loren Gray)	2019	Lost Kings	Paper Crowns	Lost Kings, Michael Pollack, Will Lobban-Bean
"Our Summer"	2019	Tomorrow X Together	The Dream Chapter: Star	The Futuristics, Jesse Saint John, Shae Jacobs, "hitman" bang, ADORA
"Naked"	2019	Emily Weisband	Identity Crisis	Emily Weisband, Kyle Shearer
"Wanted"	2019	NOTD and Daya	Non-album single	NOTD, Daya, Sam Martin, Isaiah Tejada
"Waste"	2019	Dove Cameron	Bloodshot / Waste	Dove Cameron, Chloe Angelides
"+I QUIT180327+"	2019	CL	In the Name of Love	CL, TOKKI, Michael Pollack, Sean Myer
"Ur So Beautiful"	2019	Grace VanderWaal	Letters Vol. 1	Grace VanderWaal, Ido Zmishlany, Sophie B. Hawkins
"Inside Out"	2020	Zedd and Griff	Non-album single	Zedd, Griff, Jonas Jeberg, Michael Pollack
"Nice Things"	2020	Far East Movement with Henry and AlunaGeorge	Non-album single	Far East Movement, Aluna Francis, Antonio Cuna, Kyle Shearer, Nate Campany
"Bad One"	2020	Kiiara	Lil Kiiwi	Jussifer, John Mitchell
"Honest with You"	2020	Laura Marano	You	Laura Marano, Ido Zmishlany
"Five More Minutes"	2020	Jonas Brothers	Non-album single	Jonas Brothers, James Ghaleb, Zach Skelton, Casey Smith
"Tell Your Girlfriend"	2021	Anne-Marie	Therapy	Anne-Marie, Blake Slatkin
"Birthday"	2021	Anne-Marie	Therapy	Anne-Marie, Keith Sorrells, Oak Felder
"To Be Young" (featuring Doja Cat)	2021	Anne-Marie	Therapy	Anne-Marie, Doja Cat, Louis Bell, Teo Halm
"Unstable" (featuring The Kid Laroi)	2021	Justin Bieber	Justice	Justin Bieber, The Kid Laroi, James Gutch, Gregory Hein, Rami Yacoub, Billy Walsh, Ayden Szymczak
"When I Close My Eyes"	2021	Chelsea Cutler	When I Close My Eyes	Chelsea Cutler, James Alan Ghaleb, Kevin White, Lucy Healey
"Wow"	2021	Zara Larsson	Poster Girl	Marshmello, Thomas Eriksen, Joakim Haukaas, Madison Love
"Ruin My Life"	2021	Zara Larsson	Poster Girl	Michael Pollack, Sermstyle, Jackson Foote, Stefan Johnson, Jordan K. Johnson
"Fuckboy"	2021	Dixie D'Amelio	Non-album single	Olivia O'Brien, M-Phazes, MAG
"Boyfriend"	2022	Dove Cameron	Alchemical: Volume 1	Dove Cameron, Evan Blair, Skyler Stonestreet
"Breakfast"	2022	Dove Cameron	Alchemical: Volume 1	Dove Cameron, Evan Blair, Jesse Finkelstein
"Blind"	2022	Emily Weisband	Non-album single	Emily Weisband, Cole Walowac, Jesse Frasure
"Indieedgycool"	2022	Gayle	A Study of the Human Experience Volume One	Taylor Gayle Rutherfurd, Jonny Shorr
"Two People"	2023	Gracie Abrams	Good Riddance	Gracie Abrams
"I Hate Boston"	2023	Reneé Rapp	Snow Angel	Reneé Rapp Ian Fitchuk, Alexander Glantz, Lucy Healey, Rob Bisel
"Tummy Hurts"	2023	Reneé Rapp	Snow Angel	Reneé Rapp, Alexander Glantz
"Amen"	2023	Alana Springsteen	Twenty Something	Alana Springsteen, Ido Zmishlany, Sarah Solovay, Derrick Southerland, Ingrid Andress, Sam Ellis
"We're Not Alike"	2023	Tate McRae	Think Later	Tate McRae, Rob Bisel
"Grave"	2023	Tate McRae	Think Later	Tate McRae, Ido Zmishlany
"Rockstar"	2024	Lisa	Alter Ego	Lisa, James Essien, Lucy Healey, Ryan Tedder, Sam Homaee
"I Hope I Never Fall in Love"	2024	Maren Morris	Intermission EP	Maren Morris, Lucy Healey, Evan Blair
"Kiss the Sky"	2024	Maren Morris	The Wild Robot (Original Motion Picture Soundtrack)	Maren Morris, Ali Tamposi, Michael Pollack, Stefan Johnson, Jordan Johnson
"No High"	2024	David Kushner	The Dichotomy	David Kushner, Evan Blair
"Even When I'm Not"	2024	Maren Morris	The Wild Robot (Original Motion Picture Soundtrack)	Ali Tamposi, Maren Morris, Isaiah Tejeda, Michael Pollack, Stefan Johnson, Jordan K. Johnson
"Cowboy"	2024	Alana Springsteen	Non-album singles	Alana Springsteen, Amy Allen, Ido Zmishlany
"Hold My Beer"	2024	Alana Springsteen	Non-album singles	Alana Springsteen, Ido Zmishlany, Sarah Solovay
"Handlebars" (featuring Dua Lipa)	2025	Jennie	Ruby	Dua Lipa, Rob Bisel, Amy Allen, James Ghaleb
"Cry For You"	2025	Isabel LaRosa	Raven	Isabel LaRosa, Thomas LaRosa, Jordan K. Johnson, Stefan Johnson
"Messy"	2025	Rosé	F1 the Album	Rosé, Cleo Tighe, Peter Rycroft, Matthew James Burns
"Hooligan"	2026	BTS	Arirang	Pablo Diaz-Reixa, Michel Magne, Pablo Martinez Alborch, Marcus Lomax, Xplicit, Jung Kook, Jasper Harris, RM, J-Hope, Suga, Derrick Milano, Pdogg, Kirsten Alysaa Spencer

== Accolades ==
List of awards and nominations received by Delacey
Organization	Year	Category	Nominated work	Result	Ref.
Academy Awards	2025	Best Original Song	"Kiss the Sky" from The Wild Robot (songwriter)	Shortlisted	
Astra Awards	2024	Best Original Song	"Kiss the Sky" from The Wild Robot (songwriter)	Nominated	
Critics' Choice Awards	2025	Best Song	"Kiss the Sky" from The Wild Robot (songwriter)	Nominated	
Denver Film Critics Society Awards	2025	Best Original Song	"Kiss the Sky" from The Wild Robot (songwriter)	Nominated	
Golden Globe Awards	2025	Best Original Song	"Kiss the Sky" from The Wild Robot (songwriter)	Nominated	
Guild Of Music Supervisors Awards	2025	Best Song Written and/or Recorded for a Film	"Kiss the Sky" from The Wild Robot (songwriter)	Nominated	
Grammy Awards	2021	Album of the Year	Justice (Triple Chucks Deluxe) (as Brittany Amaradio)	Nominated	
Hollywood Music In Media Awards	2024	Best Original Song - Animated Film	"Kiss the Sky" from The Wild Robot (songwriter)	Won	
Iowa Film Critics Association Awards	2024	Best Original Song	"Kiss the Sky" from The Wild Robot (songwriter)	Won	
Music City Film Critics Association Awards	2025	Best Original Song	"Kiss the Sky" from The Wild Robot (songwriter)	Won	
New Mexico Film Critics Awards	2024	Best Original Song	"Kiss the Sky" from The Wild Robot (songwriter)	Won	
North Carolina Film Critics Association Awards	2025	Best Original Song	"Kiss the Sky" from The Wild Robot (songwriter)	Nominated	
Puerto Rico Critics Association Awards	2025	Best Original Song	"Kiss the Sky" from The Wild Robot (songwriter)	Won	
Satellite Awards	2025	Best Original Song	"Kiss the Sky" from The Wild Robot (songwriter)	Nominated	
Las Vegas Film Critics Society Awards	2024	Best Song	"Kiss the Sky" from The Wild Robot (songwriter)	Nominated	
