= Buzzkill =

Buzzkill may refer to:

- Buzzkill (TV series)
- "Buzzkill" (CSI: NY episode)
- "Buzzkill" (song), by Luke Bryan
- "Buzz-Kill", a song by Dune Rats from The Kids Will Know It's Bullshit
- Buzzkill, a 2008 film by Second City
- Brad Armstrong (wrestler) (1962–2012), American professional wrestler who used the ringname "Buzzkill"
- Buzzkill (album), the debut studio album by American singer-songwriter Lyn Lapid, released in 2025
- Buzzkill (film), an American comedy horror film

== See also ==
- "Buzzkill(er)", a 2014 song by the Dead Weather
