= Take Me as I Am =

Take Me as I Am may refer to:

== Albums ==
- Take Me as I Am (Faith Hill album), or the title song (see below), 1993
- Take Me as I Am (Ian McCallum album), or the title song, 1997

== Songs ==
- "Take Me as I Am" (FM Static song), 2009
- "Take Me as I Am" (Faith Hill song), 1993
- "Take Me as I Am" (Mary J. Blige song), 2006
- "Take Me as I Am" (Tornike Kipiani song), 2020
- "Take Me as I Am", by Bob Dylan from Self Portrait
- "Take Me as I Am", by Frankie and Calvin from S Club 8, B-side of Dreaming
- "Take Me as I Am", by Seven Wiser from Seven Wiser
- "Take Me as I Am", by Vanessa Amorosi from Turn to Me
- "Take Me as I Am", by Wyclef Jean from The Preacher's Son
- "Take Me as I Am", from the Broadway musical Jekyll & Hyde
- "Take Me As I Am", by Example from Live Life Living
- “Take Me As I Am”, by Carly Simon from Come Upstairs
- "Take Me as I Am" by Sharissa
- "Take Me as I Am", by Rina Sawayama from RINA
- "Take Me as I Am", by The Streets from None of Us Are Getting Out of This Life Alive
- "Take Me as I Am", by Lyn Lapid from Buzzkill

== Other uses ==
- Take Me as I Am (Big Love), an episode of the American TV series Big Love
