= Burn Slow =

Burn Slow may refer to:

- Burn Slow (EP), 2018 EP by Jaira Burns
  - "Burn Slow" (Jaira Burns song), 2017
- "Burn Slow" (Wiz Khalifa song), 2015
