= The Futuristics =

American music production duo

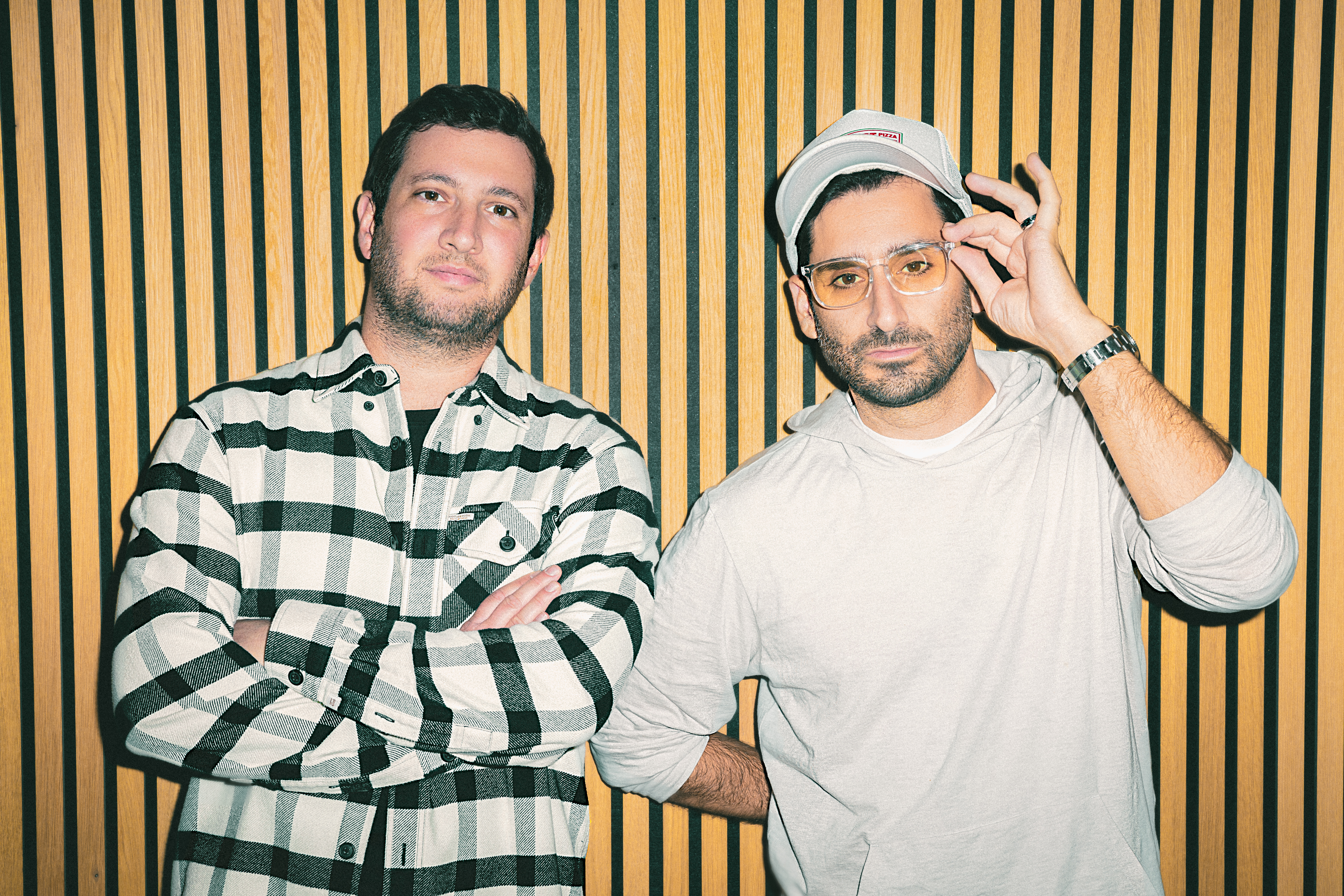
- The Futuristics in 2022

Background information
- Origin: Los Angeles, CA, U.S.
- Genres: Hip hop, pop rap, dance, pop, country, R&B
- Occupation: Producers
- Years active: 2005–present
- Members: Alex Schwartz; Joe Khajadourian

The Futuristics are an American songwriting and music production duo consisting of Alex Schwartz and Joe Khajadourian. Based in Los Angeles, the duo formed after meeting during their internship at Atlantic Records in the summer of 2005. They later launched Treehouse Records to further grow their business and pursue their passion for music.

The Futuristics have produced a range of successful tracks throughout their career and have remained dedicated as executive producer's on Pia Mia’s album "Anti Romantica", following years of consistent collaboration with her. They have also worked with JoJo Siwa in collaboration with a series of co-writers.

== Production credits ==
Year	Artist	Song
2010	Chris Brown	"Go Away"
2010	Cody Simpson	"Summertime"
2010	T.Mills	"Cure In My Cup"
2011	Cody Simpson	"Love"
2011	DJ Felli Fel, Akon, Pitbull and Jermaine Dupri	"Boomerang"
2011	The Game featuring Chris Brown	"Pot of Gold"
2011	The Lonely Island featuring Justin Timberlake and Lady Gaga	"3-Way (The Golden Rule)"
2012	Flo Rida	"I Cry" (2× Platinum US)
2012	Cody Simpson	"Summer Shade"
2012	Outasight	"Perfect Words"
2012	Bruno Mars	"Moonshine" (Official Remix)
2012	Rome	"Ounce Of Love"
2012	K'naan featuring Will.i.am	"Alone" (Additional Production Credit Only)
2013	Wiz Khalifa and 2 Chainz	"We Own It" (Fast & Furious 6) (1× Platinum US)
2013	Cody Simpson featuring Ziggy Marley	"Love"
2014	Kid Ink	"Hello World"
2014	Austin Mahone featuring Pitbull	"Mmm Yeah"
2014	DJ Felli Fel, CeeLo Green, Pitbull and Juicy J	"Have Some Fun"
2014	Cam Meekins	"Hater"
2015	Natalie La Rose featuring Jeremih	"Somebody" (2× Platinum US)
2015	Juicy J, Future, Sage the Gemini and Kevin Gates	"Payback" (Furious 7)
2015	Halsey	"Hold Me Down"
2015	Mika	"Porcelain"
2015	Trey Songz	"Serve It Up"
2015	Cee Lo Green	"Music To My Soul"
2015	Chris Brown	"Blue Jeans"
2016	Wash featuring Kevin Gates	"Where You Been"
2016	DJ Vice featuring Jasmine Thompson and Skizzy Mars	"Steady 1, 2, 3, 4"
2016	MGK and Camila Cabello	"Bad Things" (5× Platinum US)
2016	Robin Thicke featuring Juicy J	"One Shot"
2017	Leon Else	"What I Won't Do"
2017	Selena Gomez featuring Gucci Mane	"Fetish" (1× Platinum US)
2017	Liz Huett	"STFU & Hold Me"
2017	Alex Aiono featuring Trinidad Cardona	"Does It Feel Like Falling"
2017	Gryffin featuring Katie Pearlman	"Nobody Compares to You"
2017	Jaira Burns	"High Rollin"
2017	Jacob Sartorius	"Cozy"
2017	G-Eazy featuring Halsey	"Him & I" (2× Platinum US)
2017	G-Eazy featuring Charlie Puth	"Sober"
2017	Kim Viera	"Tribe" (Pitch Perfect 3)
2018	Camila Cabello	"Something's Gotta Give"
2018	Hayley Kiyoko	"Wanna Be Missed"
2018	Leon Else	"My Kind Of Love" (13 Reasons Why)
2018	Niykee Heaton	"Bad Guy"
2019	Netsky featuring Bazzi and Lil Wayne	"I Don't Even Know You Anymore"
2019	TXT	"Our Summer"
2019	Alison Wonderland	"Peace"
2019	Brother Sundance featuring Ella Boh	"Monster"
2019	Loren Gray featuring Saweetie	"Can't Do It"
2019	Ylva	"Grow Up"
2019	Pia Mia featuring Theron Theron	"Crybaby"
2019	Why Don't We	"Come to Brazil"
2019	Kiiara	"Bipolar"
2019	Blink-182	"Pin The Grenade"
2019	Blink-182	"On Some Emo Shit"
2019	Bebe Rexha	"You Can't Stop the Girl"
2019	Goody Grace featuring Blink-182	"Scumbag"
2019	AJ Mitchell	"Say It Again"
2020	Delacey and G-Eazy	"Cruel Intentions"
2020	Dove Cameron featuring Bia	"Remember Me"
2020	CXLOE	"12 Steps"
2020	Meghan Trainor	"You Don't Know Me"
2020	Goody Grace featuring G-Eazy and Juicy J	"Nothing Good"
2020	Emily Weisband	"Out Of This Car"
2021	Justin Bieber	"Lifetime"
2021	Bebe Rexha featuring Rick Ross	"Amore"
2021	Trevor Daniel	"Alone"
2022	Walk off the Earth featuring D Smoke	"Bet on Me"
2022	The Chainsmokers	"In Too Deep"
2022	Mike Posner and The Futuristics	"Turn Up"
2022	Adam Melchor	"I'm Ready"
2023	Slushii and Leah Kate	"Don't Call Me"
2023	LØLØ featuring girlfriends	"5, 6, 7, 8"
2024	Hunter Daily	"Girl Friend"
2024	Crash Adams	"Somewhere in Vegas"
2024	Crash Adams	"Right Foot First"
2024	Crash Adams	"8 days"
2024	Lena Meyer-Landrut	"Drug worth doing"
2024	Pia Mia	"Repeat After Me"
2024	Pia Mia	"You Win"
2024	Pia Mia	"Justify"
2024	Pia Mia	"Love Him Bad"
2024	Pia Mia	"Cute Sassy Sexy"
2024	Pia Mia	"Sugar"
2024	Pia Mia	"Nice and Slow"
2024	Pia Mia	"Wish You Well" featuring Marc E. Bassy
2024	Pia Mia	"Owe Me"
2024	Pia Mia	"All For You (Interlude)"
2024	Pia Mia	"Hurt Forever"
2024	Pia Mia	"Make Me Smile"
2024	Pia Mia	"Easiest Goodbye"
2024	Pia Mia	"Lover"
2024	Pia Mia	"Wonder (Outro)"
2024	Jojo Siwa	"Balance Baby"
2024	Jojo Siwa	"Iced Coffee"
2024	Trinity Lake	"You Win, I Miss You"
2024	Alex Sampson	"Wallflower"
2024	Nate Smith	"Faith"
2025	AleXa	"Fatal"
2025	Crash Adams	"New Heart"
2025	Alemeda	"Happy With You"
2026	Gresley	"How"
2026	Gresley	"Babyface"
