= Sugarcoat =

Sugarcoat may refer to:

== Music ==
- Sugarcoating, album by Martin Sexton
- Sugarcoat, EP by Finabah
- "Sugarcoat" (Jaira Burns song)
- "Sugarcoat" (George Ezra song)
- "Sugarcoat", song by Breaking Benjamin from We Are Not Alone (Breaking Benjamin album)
- "Sugarcoat", song by War from a Harlots Mouth from MMX (War from a Harlots Mouth album)
- "Sugarcoat", song by Rustic Overtones Rooms by the Hour 1998
- "Sugarcoat", song by Jason Ward from Almighty Row 2009
- "Sugarcoat", song by Kiss of Life member Natty from EP Kiss of Life 2023

== Other ==
- Sugarcoat, a character in My Little Pony: Equestria Girls
