= Watch It Burn =

Single by Katy Perry
- Written: March 2025—August 2025
- Released: June 25, 2026
- Genre: Pop rock; alternative rock
- Length: 2:55
- Label: Capitol
- Songwriters: Katy Perry; Amanda "Kiddo" Ibanez; Skyler Stonestreet; Justin Tranter; Jason Gill; Daniel Crean; Eren Cannata
- Producers: Justin Tranter; Jason Gill; Daniel Crean; Eren Cannata

Katy Perry singles chronology
"Bandaids" (2025)	"Watch It Burn" (2026)

Music video
- "Watch It Burn" on YouTube

"Watch It Burn" is a song by the American singer-songwriter Katy Perry. It was released through Capitol Records on June 25, 2026, alongside a music video that Christian Breslauer directed. She co-wrote this track with Amanda "Kiddo" Ibanez, Skyler Stonestreet, and its producers Justin Tranter, Jason Gill, Daniel Crean, and Eren Cannata. "Watch It Burn" is a pop rock track with lyrics about bottled-up anger, emotional release, and reclaiming personal power after years of "people-pleasing" and "love and light" conditioning.

== Promotion and release ==
On November 6, 2025, Katy Perry released the music video for "Bandaids". Towards the end of the video, "Watch It Burn" was mentioned by a radio DJ, serving as an Easter egg for its future release. On June 14, 2026, she posted a teaser video on her social media, with the caption reading "Maybe it's finally time to watch it burn". In the video, her song "The One That Got Away" (2011) plays in background, and the singer wears an all-black ensemble and is holding a baseball bat. Two days later, she posted another teaser video on social media, featuring her singing the track while wielding a baseball bat inside a graffiti-filled rage room and wearing the same all-black ensemble. On June 17, 2026, Perry confirmed the song's title of "Watch It Burn" during her appearance on American singer-songwriter Justin Tranter's podcast Unfamous with Justin Tranter. The following day, she shared the pre-save links for "Watch It Burn" on her social media, along with the single cover and the release date of June 25. Its single cover features a close-up of her face covered in beads of water and illuminated by a glowing light.

== Composition ==
Perry, Amanda "Kiddo" Ibanez, and Skyler Stonestreet co-wrote "Watch It Burn" with its producers Tranter, Jason Gill, Daniel Crean, and Eren Cannata. Writing took place from March to August of 2025. The track is a pop rock and alternative rock "fiery anthem" where Perry unleashes "pain and suppressed anger", with a runtime of two minutes and 55 seconds. It is written in the key of B minor with a tempo of 130 beats per minute. Nicole Glennon from the Irish Examiner wrote the song has a "rock-inflected edge", with Sophie Gliott of Hot Press adding that it "signifies a step in a new direction for Perry". "Watch It Burn" explores themes of bottled-up anger, emotional release, and reclaiming personal power after years of "people-pleasing" and "love and light" conditioning. Moriel Mizrahi Finder of Elle suggested that the lyrics were focused "less on revenge and more on moving forward". On Tranter's podcast, Perry explained the song's lyrics of "light about match" is a reflection on her "tough" past year and about wrestling with her "darkness".

On June 18, 2026, when appearing on Zane Lowe's talk show, Perry opened up about her hesitation to release "Watch It Burn" and originally repeating to herself, "I'm never going to release this". She also discussed the honesty behind the lyrics, which reflect on moving past a painful relationship and putting herself first.

== Critical reception ==
Writing for Clash, Gennaro Costanzo rated "Watch It Burn" eight out of ten and praised its energetic pop rock production, highlighting its anthemic bridge. He compared the song to a more mature, more nonchalant, and angrier counterpart to Perry's 2008 single "Hot n Cold". Sebas Alonso of Jenesaispop noted its connection to 2000s rock, particularly Linkin Park, and praised its melody, while favoring its rock elements over the electronic dance music influences of Smile (2020) and 143 (2024). Chiara-Lee Haartje of Radio Hamburg also praised the song's blend of pop and rock, describing it as one of Perry's most emotional releases and noting its more serious tone.

== Music video ==
=== Production and release ===
A music video for "Watch It Burn" premiered on the same day as its single release. It was directed by Christian Breslauer, and the production was handled by London Alley and the Lucky Bastards. The video received a premiere broadcast on MTV Live, MTVU, and on the Paramount Times Square billboards. On YouTube, the music video for "Watch It Burn" surpassed 350,000 views within twelve hours of its release.

=== Synopsis ===
Serving as a sequel to the video for "Bandaids", the music video for "Watch It Burn" begins from a point-of-view perspective, showing a badly burned Perry being wheeled through the halls by nurses in hazmat suits. During surgery, a scorpion tail abruptly emerges from her back and attacks one of the surgeons. Amidst the ensuing chaos, a priest in protective gear arrives to perform an apparent exorcism while Perry repeatedly loses consciousness. Upon awakening, she examines herself in a shattered mirror. Though the tail initially seems to have disappeared, its sudden reemergence prompts her to flee the hospital in a red Jeep Wrangler. When taking the Jeep through a car wash, she undergoes a physical transformation there into a human-scorpion hybrid, complete with a large, articulated stinger. Perry exchanges the Jeep for a black suit and dresses in that before traveling down a city street. Her tail develops a mind of its own while outdoors, shattering windows, keying car doors, and setting fire to the surroundings and various media props, including a newsstand displaying fictitious magazines. The video concludes with Perry entering a church, where she collapses in front of the congregation before the churchgoers lift her and submerge her into a bath on the altar, which washes away her scorpion tail and restores her to human form.

=== Analysis and reception ===
Costanzo of Clash wrote the music video's visuals leaned heavily into Perry's "5° Scorpio placement". He further called it "an uncompromising visual metaphor for a sign known for destruction, rebirth, and claws". Writing for People, Lily Brown suggested that the use of a scorpion tail symbolizes self-acceptance and embracing "darker sides" without letting them take control. Brown also noted that the video's Easter eggs refer to media manipulation. Margaret Farrell of Stereogum did not understand the church scene towards the end of the video, uncertain on whether it was supposed to connect to Perry's "Christian rock beginnings" or be "a literal spiritual rebirth or an artistic one". Haartje of Radio Hamburg praised the visuals in the video, calling it "spectacular", and described Perry's physical transformation as "a symbol of a radical new beginning".

== Live performances ==
Perry performed "Watch It Burn" live for the first time on June 18, 2026, during her Out of Office Tour as part Son do Camiño festival in Santiago, Spain, a week before the song's official release. Two days later, she sang the track during Rock in Rio Lisboa 11. On June 24, 2026, Perry performed "Watch It Burn" in Malahide Castle, Dublin, Ireland.

== Track listing ==
- Digital download and streaming
  1. "Watch It Burn" – 2:55
  2. "Bandaids" – 3:08

== Personnel ==
- Katy Perry – vocals, songwriting
- Amanda "Kiddo" Ibanez – songwriting
- Skyler Stonestreet – songwriting
- Justin Tranter – songwriting, production
- Jason Gill – songwriting, production
- Daniel Crean – songwriting, production
- Eren Cannata – songwriting, production

Credits adapted from Universal Music Group.

== Charts ==
=== Weekly charts ===
Weekly chart performance
Chart (2026)	Peak position
Argentina Airplay (Monitor Latino)	19
Australia Airplay (RCS Media Monitors)	38
Austria Airplay (MusicTrace)	6
Bolivia Anglo Airplay (Monitor Latino)	9
Central America Anglo Airplay (Monitor Latino)	9
Chile Anglo Airplay (Monitor Latino)	15
Croatia International Airplay (Top lista)	20
Costa Rica Anglo Airplay (Monitor Latino)	12
Ecuador Anglo Airplay (Monitor Latino)	12
Finland Airplay (Radiosoittolista)	8
Germany Airplay (MusicTrace)	11
Guatemala Anglo Airplay (Monitor Latino)	9
Israel International TV Airplay (Media Forest)	5
Italy Airplay (EarOne)	45
Kazakhstan Airplay (TopHit)	35
Lithuania Airplay (TopHit)	27
New Zealand Hot Singles (RMNZ)	9
Nicaragua Anglo Airplay (Monitor Latino)	2
Panama Anglo Airplay (Monitor Latino)	9
Paraguay Anglo Airplay (Monitor Latino)	6
San Marino Airplay (SMRTV Top 50)	40
Slovakia Airplay (ČNS IFPI)	25
Slovenia Airplay (Radiomonitor)	11
Switzerland Airplay (MusicTrace)	15
UK Singles Sales (OC)	34
Uruguay Anglo Airplay (Monitor Latino)	16
US Adult Pop Airplay (Billboard)	30

=== Monthly charts ===
Monthly chart performance
Chart (2026)	Peak position
Kazakhstan Airplay (TopHit)	36
Lithuania Airplay (TopHit)	36
Paraguay Airplay (SGP)	74

== Release history ==
Release dates and formats
Region	Date	Format(s)	Label	Ref.
Various	June 25, 2026	Digital download; streaming	Capitol	
Italy	June 26, 2026	Radio airplay	Universal	
Various	October 2, 2026	7-inch vinyl	Capitol	
