= Skyler Stonestreet =

American songwriter

Skyler Stonestreet is an American musician and singer-songwriter based in Los Angeles, California. She is a writer on hit tracks such as Ariana Grande and Justin Bieber's "Stuck with U", The Chainsmokers' "Kanye", Dua Lipa's "IDGAF", Tate McRae and Jeremy Zucker's "That Way", Hailee Steinfeld's "Wrong Direction", Marshmello's "Chasing Colors", Lennon Stella's "Older Than I Am", Dove Cameron's "Boyfriend" and many more. As a writer and a featured vocalist Skyler can be heard on tracks from acts such as Seven Lions' "Freesol" and Cheat Codes and Nicky Romero's "Sober".

== Career ==
Skyler Stonestreet was in a competition for Rolling Stone to become the first ever unsigned artist to be on the cover. After making it to the final eight, she wrote a song called "Polaroid" which became part of the campaign for the new Z340 Polaroid Camera and debuted on Polaroid.com. Rolling Stone has described her music as, "Flirty pop, full of bells, finger snaps and breathy vocals."

Her music has been featured on Grey's Anatomy (ABC), One Tree Hill (CW), Jane By Design (ABC Family), Switched At Birth (ABC family), Royal Pains (USA), Ghost Whisperer (CBS), Make It or Break It (ABC Family), Against the Wall (Lifetime), Spotlight 25 (Lifetime) as well as on MTV, VH1 and Oxygen.

== Credits ==
Year	Title	Artist	Album	Role
2011	"Home"	Mod Sun	Non-album single	Performer
2013	"Electric Glow"	Tritonal	Metamorphic II	Writer, Performer
2014	"Kanye"	The Chainsmokers	Non-album single	Writer, Performer
2014	"Call It Whatever"	Bella Thorne	Non-album single	Writer
2014	"We'll Be The Stars"	Sabrina Carpenter	Eyes Wide Open	Writer
2014	"Dracula"	Bea Miller	Young Blood	Writer
2015	"Un Corazón Se Rompe"	Natalia Jiménez	Creo en Mí	Writer
2015	"One Last Night on Earth"	Dada Life	XOXO (Music from the Netflix Original Film)	Writer
2015	"Beautiful Disaster"	Mika	No Place in Heaven	Writer
2015	"Good Guys"	Mika	No Place in Heaven	Writer
2015	"Ordinary Man"	Mika	No Place in Heaven	Writer
2015	"Promiseland"	Mika	No Place in Heaven	Writer
2015	"Rebel Hearts"	Hilary Duff	Breathe In. Breathe Out.	Writer
2016	"Except For Us"	Austin Mahone	For Me + You	Writer
2017	"Freesol"	Seven Lions	Where I Won't Be Found	Writer, Performer
2017	"Chasing Colors"	Marshmello & Ookay (ft. Noah Cyrus)	Non-album single	Writer
2017	"IDGAF"	Dua Lipa	Dua Lipa	Writer
2017	"I Was Born"	Hanson	Middle of Everywhere: The Greatest Hits	Writer
2017	"Sober"	Cheat Codes & Nicky Romero	Non-album single	Writer, Performer
2017	"Okokok"	Jaira Burns	Burn Slow	Writer
2019	"I Do It All For You"	Walk Off the Earth	Here We Go!	Writer
2019	"Feel Something"	Kash Doll (ft. Teyana Taylor)	Stacked	Writer
2020	"Wrong Direction"	Hailee Steinfeld	Half Written Story	Writer
2020	"That Way"	Tate McRae	All the Things I Never Said	Writer
2020	"Older Than I Am"	Lennon Stella	Three. Two. One.	Writer
2020	"Stuck with U"	Ariana Grande & Justin Bieber	Non-album single	Writer
2021	"Summerland"	Half Alive	Conditions of a Punk	Writer
2021	"That Way"	Tate McRae & Jeremy Zucker	Non-album single	Writer
2022	"Naked in Manhattan"	Chappell Roan	The Rise and Fall of a Midwest Princess	Writer
2022	"Boyfriend"	Dove Cameron	Alchemical: Volume 1	Writer
2022	"Read Your Mind"	Sabrina Carpenter	Emails I Can't Send	Writer
2022	"Blue Side of the Sky"	Sofia Carson	Purple Hearts (Original Soundtrack)	Writer
2022	"Come Back Home"	Sofia Carson	Purple Hearts (Original Soundtrack)	Writer
2022	"I Didn't Know"	Sofia Carson	Purple Hearts (Original Soundtrack)	Writer
2022	"I Hate the Way"	Sofia Carson	Purple Hearts (Original Soundtrack)	Writer
2022	"Gaslight"	Nessa Barrett	Young Forever	Writer
2022	"Bad Thoughts"	Half Alive	Conditions of a Punk	Writer
2022	"Hush"	Ari Abdul	Fallen Angel	Writer
2023	"Gemini Moon"	Reneé Rapp	Snow Angel	Writer
2023	"I Wish"	Reneé Rapp	Snow Angel	Writer
2023	"Poison Poison"	Reneé Rapp	Snow Angel	Writer
2023	"Pretty Girls"	Reneé Rapp	Snow Angel	Writer
2023	"Lonesome"	Sabrina Carpenter	Emails I Can't Send Fwd	Writer
2023	"Happy"	Kesha	Gag Order	Writer
2023	"Too Far Gone"	Kesha	Gag Order	Writer
2023	"Messier"	Tate McRae	Think Later	Writer
2023	"30 Secondes"	Mika	Que ta tête fleurisse toujours	Writer
2024	"Days of Girlhood"	Dylan Mulvaney	Non-album single	Writer
2024	"Best Ever"	Wendy	Wish You Hell	Writer
2024	"Automatic"	Half Alive	Persona	Writer
2025	"Love Looks Pretty On You"	Nessa Barrett	Aftercare	Writer
2025	"Beg for It"	Grace VanderWaal	Childstar	Writer
2025	"Behavioral Problems"	Grace VanderWaal	Childstar	Writer
2025	"Brand New"	Grace VanderWaal	Childstar	Writer
2025	"Fade"	Grace VanderWaal	Childstar	Writer
2025	"Who"	Lyn Lapid	Buzzkill	Writer
2025	"Sourpatch"	HITGS	Things We Love: I	Writer
2025	"Red Flag"	Kesha	Period	Writer
2025	"Cathedral"	Kesha	Period	Writer
2025	"Trashman"	Kesha	Period (...)	Writer
2025	"Chichinya"	Ashnikko	Smoochies	Writer
2025	"I Want My Boyfriends to Kiss"	Ashnikko	Smoochies	Writer
2025	"It Girl"	Ashnikko	Smoochies	Writer
2025	"Itty Bitty"	Ashnikko	Smoochies	Writer
2025	"Liquid"	Ashnikko	Smoochies	Writer
2025	"Skin Cleared"	Ashnikko	Smoochies	Writer
2025	"Wet Like"	Ashnikko (feat. Cobrah)	Smoochies	Writer
2025	"Tar"	Jade	That's Showbiz Baby! The Encore	Writer
2026	"Pinky Up"	Katseye	Wild	Writer
2026	"Origami!"	Kesha	Non-album single	Writer
2026	"Watch It Burn"	Katy Perry	Non-album single	Writer
2026	"Raining Inside"	Willow Avalon	Pink Pocket Pistol	Writer
	„ACCELERANDO“	Grimes & VADAKIN	Non-album single	
