= Burn Slow (EP) =

EP by Jaira Burns
- Released: July 27, 2018
- Recorded: 2017–18
- Genres: Pop; reggae; hip hop
- Length: 25:58
- Label: Interscope
- Producers: Charles Stephens III; Ryan Tedder; Noise Club; ADP; Aalias; Stargate; Sir Nolan; Eman; Andrew Goldstein; Emile Ghantous; Keith Hetrick; Jay Weathers

Singles from Burn Slow
- 1. "Burn Slow" Released: August 11, 2017; 2. "Okokok" Released: March 9, 2018; 3. "Sugarcoat" Released: May 11, 2018; 4. "Low Key in Love" Released: June 15, 2018

Burn Slow is the debut extended play (EP) by American singer-songwriter Jaira Burns. It was released on July 27, 2018, via Interscope Records. The project was preceded by the singles "Burn Slow", "Okokok", "Sugarcoat" and "Low Key in Love", which were released on August 11, 2017, March 9, May 11 and June 15, 2018, respectively.

== Background and promotion ==
On June 16, 2017, Burns released her debut single, "Ugly" which was featured in a commercial for Beats Electronics and Balmain headphone collaboration starring Kylie Jenner. An accompanying music video for the track, directed by Wiissa was released on June 28. However, it was ultimately removed from the final track listing. On August 11, she released the lead single of the record titled "Burn Slow". The music video directed by Alexandra Gavillet was later released on September 6. On October 20, she released another single titled "High Rollin", which was removed from the final track listing as well. On March 9, she released the second single titled "Okokok", and on May 2, 2018, the music video directed by Lucy Sandler was released. On May 11, she released the third single titled "Sugarcoat" and on June 6, a music video directed by Sophia Ray was released. On June 15, the fourth single titled "Low Key in Love" was released.

== Critical reception ==
Michael Love Michael of Papermag wrote positively about the record saying that "it's packed with ephemeral, slow-burning energy. But don't be fooled: there are some legit bangers on this record."

== Track listing ==
Credits taken from Qobuz.

No.	Title	Writer(s)	Producer(s)	Length
1.	"Okokok"	Robert McCurdy; Skyler Stonestreet; Christopher Petrosino	Noise Club	3:06
2.	"Sugarcoat"	Brittany Amaradio; Sizzy Rocket; ADP; Brittany Mullen; Jaira Burns	ADP	3:24
3.	"Burn Slow"	Carlos Battey; Charles Stephens III; Ryan Tedder; Michelle Elaine Buzz; Burns	Stephens III; Tedder	3:12
4.	"Low Key in Love"	Burns; Alexandra Yatchenko; Aaron Kleinstub; Tedder	Kleinstub	3:24
5.	"This Time Around"	Nolan Lambroza; Mikkel Eriksen; Yatchenko; Burns (Note: Burns is not credited as a writer on streaming services, although she is listed as a writer in ASCAP repertoire.)	Stargate; Lambroza	2:58
6.	"Bounce Right Back"	Stephens III; Tedder; Georgia Ku	Stephens III; Tedder	3:20
7.	"Didn't I"	Ku; Andrew Goldstein; Emanuel "Eman" Kiriakou; Evan "Kidd" Bogart	Eman; Goldstein	3:09
8.	"Waste Away"	Jonathan Lee; Kirsten Collins; Emile Ghantous; Keith Hetrick; Mackenzie John Elvis Jamieson	Ghantous; Hetrick; Jay Weathers	3:25
Total length:				25:58

== Personnel ==
Credits adapted from Tidal.

- Jaira Burns – lead vocals (all tracks)
- Noise Club – production (track 1)
- Chris Gehringer − mixing, mastering, studio personnel (track 1)
- Gavin Finn − engineering, studio personnel (track 1)
- Tony Maserati − mixing, studio personnel (tracks 1, 5)
- ADP − production (track 2)
- Matt Colton − mixing assistance, studio personnel (track 2)
- Eric J Dubowsky − mixing, studio personnel (track 2)
- Charles Stephens III − production (tracks 3, 6)
- Ryan Tedder − production (track 3)
- Erik Madrid − mixing, studio personnel (track 3)
- Jorge Gutierrez − mixing assistance, studio personnel (track 3)
- Aalias − production (track 4)
- Matt Colton − mastering, studio personnel (track 4)
- Mitch McCarthy − mixing, studio personnel (tracks 4, 6−8)
- Nolan Lambroza − production (track 5)
- Stargate − production (track 5)
- Chris Athens − mastering, studio personnel (tracks 5−8)
- Emanuel "Eman" Kiriakou − production (track 7)
- Andrew Goldstein − production (track 7)
- Emile Ghantous − production (track 8)
- Keith Hetrick − production, co-production (track 8)
- Jay Weathers − production, co-production (track 8)

== Release history ==
Region	Date	Format(s)	Label	Ref.
Various	July 27, 2018	Digital download; streaming	Interscope Records	
