= Anger Room =

Anger Room, LLC
- Type: Private
- Founded: 2008
- Founder: Donna Alexander
- Headquarters: Dallas, Texas, United States
- Services: Rage room

Anger Room is a rage room in Dallas, Texas that rents out rooms furnished with common objects that people can then destroy.

It was opened in August 2008 by Donna Alexander.
