= Sugarcoat (Jaira Burns song) =

Single by Jaira Burns

from the EP Burn Slow
- Released: May 11, 2018
- Genre: Electro-R&B
- Length: 3:24
- Label: Interscope
- Songwriters: Delacey; Sizzy Rocket; ADP; Brittany Mullen; Jaira Burns
- Producer: ADP

Jaira Burns singles chronology
| "Okokok" (2018) | "Sugarcoat" (2018) | "Low Key in Love" (2018) |

"Sugarcoat" is a song recorded by American singer-songwriter Jaira Burns. It was released on May 11, 2018, by Interscope Records as the third single from her debut extended play (EP) Burn Slow, (2018). It was written by Delacey, Sizzy Rocket, ADP, Brittany Mullen, Jaira Burns and produced by the latter three. Lyrically, Burns talks about giving someone a chance to screw her over.

== Composition ==
"Sugarcoat" was written by Delacey, Sizzy Rocket, ADP, Brittany Mullen, Jaira Burns and produced by the latter three. Written in the key of D♭ major, "Sugarcoat" has a tempo of 122 beats per minute. It's an electro-R&B track. Lyrically, Burns talks about giving someone a chance to screw her over. Mike Wass from Idolator described the song as "admirably angry". The song begins with the lines "Are you proud of this since you ruined it?/ I'm so fucking tired of you/ So emotionless, something I can't fix/ And I'm just way too good for you" sung by Burns. During the chorus she sings "And I hate your tattoos and your hair and your car and your clothes/ And I hate when you're drinking 'cause that's when you fuck up the most/ And I hate that I gave you a chance when I know that you're not what I want/ And I can't sugarcoat it".

== Critical reception ==
Writing for Burn Slow EP, Michael Love Michael from Papermag said that "it's a moody, broody bop about simply tellin' it like it is in a relationship, a virtue that seems to be a lost art these days. As a new and young voice, it's refreshing to hear Burns — someone unafraid to be honest, even if it hurts a little."

== Music video ==
The video for "Sugarcoat" was directed by Sophia Ray. It was released on June 6, 2018, via Burns' VEVO channel.

== Credits and personnel ==
Credits adapted from Tidal.

- Jaira Burns − vocals, songwriter
- Delacey − songwriter
- Sizzy Rocket − songwriter
- ADP − songwriter, producer
- Brittany Mullen − songwriter
- Matt Colton − assistant mixer, studio personnel
- Eric J Dubowsky − mixer, studio personnel
