= Fetish (song) =

2017 single by Selena Gomez

Single by Selena Gomez featuring Gucci Mane
- Released: July 13, 2017
- Studio: Big Noize Studio (Hollywood, CA); The Hit Factory (Miami, FL)
- Genre: Alternative R&B; trap-pop; electro hip hop; alternative pop; R&B
- Length: 3:06
- Label: Interscope
- Composer(s): Alex Schwartz; Joe Khajadourian; Jonas Jeberg; Selena Gomez
- Lyricist(s): Chloe Angelides; Brett McLaughlin; Gino Barletta; Radric Davis
- Producer(s): Jonas Jeberg; The Futuristics

Selena Gomez singles chronology
"Bad Liar" (2017)	"Fetish" (2017)	"Wolves" (2017)

Gucci Mane singles chronology
"Tone It Down" (2017)	"Fetish" (2017)	"Lit" (2017)

Music video
- "Fetish" on YouTube

"Fetish" is a song by American singer Selena Gomez featuring guest vocals from American rapper Gucci Mane. It appears as a bonus track on the international and Target exclusive edition of Gomez's third studio album, Rare (2020). The song was written by Gomez, Gucci Mane, Chloe Angelides, Brett McLaughlin, Gino Barletta, and its producers Jonas Jeberg, Joe Khajadourian, and Alex Schwartz.

"Fetish" received widespread acclaim from music critics, who complimented its experimental nature as well as Gomez's vocals and subsequent artistic growth. The song's music video was directed by Petra Collins and released on July 26, 2017. Commercially, the song reached the top 10 in Canada, the Czech Republic, Hungary, Malaysia and Slovakia; the top 20 in Lebanon, New Zealand, the Philippines, Portugal and Spain; as well as the top 40 in Australia, Austria, Denmark, France, Germany, Ireland, Norway, Sweden, Switzerland, the United Kingdom, and the United States. It was certified platinum by the RIAA for shifting a million units in the US.

== Background and release ==
Gomez first teased "Fetish" through a short clip which debuted at the end of the music video for her previous single, "Bad Liar". Before the teasing, it was speculated rapper Gucci Mane would appear as the featured artist on a future release, with Mane confirming the collaboration during an interview with 99 Jamz radio station. Gomez followed with several cryptic images tied to the forthcoming song on her Instagram account. The image for the single cover was shot by fashion photographer Petra Collins, who also lensed her artwork for "Bad Liar". It shows Gomez next to a broken-down car carrying paper grocery bags. The single was released to digital music stores on July 13, while an accompanying "playlist video" premiered on Spotify and on her Vevo channel. The audio video features a shot that focuses on her lips while she performs the song. The single was serviced to US contemporary hit radio on July 25.

== Composition and lyrical interpretation ==
"Fetish"
A 19-second sample of "Fetish", with Gomez singing the chorus. Described as a "seductive" track by Brittany Spanos of Rolling Stone, it is a trap-pop, alt pop and R&B ballad with auto-tuned effects. Also featured in background vocals is the Scandinavian music tradition Kulning, possibly attributable to the Danish origins of producer Jonas Jeberg.

"Fetish" is a trap-pop and alternative R&B ballad that contains a beat that blends R&B and electronic music. Its sound has been also described as electro hip hop, alt-pop and "hazy" R&B. Lars Brandle from Billboard perceived the presence of auto-tuned effects in its production. Lyrically, the song explores themes of sexuality and sexual desire, in the chorus Gomez discusses the effect attraction has on a lover, while Mane's verse mentions the chemistry between these paramours, with Gomez's breathy vocals pairing around the beats. A writer from Bustle noted that "Gomez admits that while she totally understands why the object of her affection would be a little addicted to her, even when 'I push you out', they come running right back."

== Critical reception ==
"Fetish" received widespread critical acclaim. Mike Wass of Idolator described the song as Gomez's "most scandalous" and "most adventurous" offering yet, stating her transformation into "pop's most experimental princess is all but complete." Wass concluded saying Gomez has "come into her own as an artist, confidently dabbling in sub-genres usually reserved for the alt crowd." XXL writer Peter A. Berry felt the "atmospheric, stripped down" instrumental is "perfect for the bedroom," while Mane's verse "adds an extra layer of dopeness." Time's Raisa Bruner called it a "slow-burning, seductive pop song [which] allows Gomez to play with the distinctive textures and rhythms of her voice, developing into a sinuous, alluring track that smartly dispenses with overbearing production, instead focusing in on the star attraction."

== Music video ==
=== Background and synopsis ===
The music video was directed by Petra Collins and was released on July 26, 2017. The video opens with three shots of what appears to be Gomez soaking wet with her hair dripping seductively over her face in mirror images then shows Gomez in a pale-yellow dress, carrying bags of groceries similar to the song's cover artwork, on a seemingly normal suburban street, in a role that appears to be a beleaguered housewife, as noted by Stereogum. As the video progresses, Gomez takes part in a range of strange activities. Inside a suburban home, the singer is seen soaking wet (similar to the opening shots earlier) in a dining table with water sprinkling as if it is raining, with candles in the scenery. Then she eats soap, finds a broken glass of wine and proceeds to taste one of the broken fragments, puts lipstick over her teeth, ties a rope around her tongue into a bow, inserting her tongue through an eyelash curler and then writhes around on the kitchen floor, while Gucci Mane raps his verse in a smoky lit underground basement. The clip ends with a shot of Gomez smiling inside an industrial freezer.

=== Reception ===
Reviewing the clip, Tatiana Cirisano of Billboard felt it "gives off major Virgin Suicides-meets-Wild at Heart vibes." Entertainment Weekly's Nick Romano noted how the image of Gomez's character is "juxtaposed with her sinister obsessions."

The video's stylist Stella Greenspan drew references from Nobuyoshi Araki's photography books and Isabelle Adjani's performance in the 1981 film Possession to achieve a horror-film inspired aesthetic, within a story of a "good girl gone bad". Greenspan told Vogue:

As Selena’s character progresses, so do the clothes—the plain, pale yellow dress is so pretty, and then we see her in the crazier, Simone Rocha dress where she’s wet and you can see her underwear beneath... We wanted her to be autonomous, sexy, and in control of her sexuality, and the fashion played a huge role in that... For example, the Simone Rocha dress worked so well because of the way Simone designs her clothing and views femininity—her dresses are obviously so beautiful, but they also hold an ugliness in them. They’re layered, torn, colorful, and full.

== Track listing ==
- Digital download
1. "Fetish" (featuring Gucci Mane) – 3:06
- Galantis remix
1. "Fetish" (featuring Gucci Mane) [Galantis remix] – 3:27

== Credits and personnel ==
Credits and personnel adapted from Rare album liner notes.

- Selena Gomez – lead vocals, songwriting
- Gucci Mane – featured vocals, songwriting
- Chloe Angelides – background vocals, songwriting
- Jonas Jeberg – production, keyboards, bass, drums, songwriting
- Joe Khajadourian – keyboards, bass, drums, songwriting
- Alex Schwartz – keyboards, bass, drums, songwriting
- Brett McLaughlin – songwriting
- Gino "Farrago" Barletta – songwriting
- Benjamin Rice – vocal engineering, recording
- The Futuristics – production
- Manny Marroquin – mixing
- Chris Gehringer – mastering

== Charts ==
=== Weekly charts ===
Chart (2017)	Peak position
Australia (ARIA)	23
Austria (Ö3 Austria Top 40)	31
Belgium (Ultratip Bubbling Under Flanders)	2
Belgium (Ultratip Bubbling Under Wallonia)	5
Canada (Canadian Hot 100)	10
Czech Republic (Rádio – Top 100)	60
Czech Republic (Singles Digitál Top 100)	10
Dominican Republic Anglo (Monitor Latino)	10
Denmark (Tracklisten)	22
France (SNEP)	55
Germany (GfK)	36
Hungary (Single Top 40)	19
Hungary (Stream Top 40)	7
Ireland (IRMA)	29
Italy (FIMI)	53
Lebanon (Lebanese Top 20)	12
Malaysia (RIM)	5
Netherlands (Single Top 100)	49
New Zealand (Recorded Music NZ)	16
Norway (VG-lista)	29
Philippines (Philippine Hot 100)	19
Portugal (AFP)	12
Scotland (OCC)	36
Slovakia (Rádio Top 100)	53
Slovakia (Singles Digitál Top 100)	5
Spain (PROMUSICAE)	53
Sweden (Sverigetopplistan)	24
Switzerland (Schweizer Hitparade)	28
UK Singles (OCC)	33
US Billboard Hot 100	27
US Pop Airplay (Billboard)	19
US Rhythmic (Billboard)	39

=== Year-end charts ===
Chart (2017)	Position
Brazil (Pro-Música Brasil)	177
Hungary (Stream Top 40)	91

== Certifications ==
Region	Certification	Certified units/sales
Australia (ARIA)	2× Platinum	140,000^{‡}
Brazil (Pro-Música Brasil)	Diamond	250,000^{‡}
Canada (Music Canada)	2× Platinum	160,000^{‡}
Denmark (IFPI Danmark)	Gold	45,000^{‡}
France (SNEP)	Gold	100,000^{‡}
Italy (FIMI)	Gold	25,000^{‡}
New Zealand (RMNZ)	Platinum	30,000^{‡}
Norway (IFPI Norway)	Platinum	60,000^{‡}
Poland (ZPAV)	Gold	25,000^{‡}
Portugal (AFP)	Gold	5,000^{‡}
United Kingdom (BPI)	Silver	200,000^{‡}
United States (RIAA)	Platinum	1,000,000^{‡}
Streaming
Sweden (GLF)	Gold	4,000,000^{†}
^{‡} Sales+streaming figures based on certification alone.^{†} Streaming-only figures based on certification alone.

== Release history ==
Region	Date	Format(s)	Version	Label(s)	Ref.
Various	July 13, 2017	Digital download	Original	Interscope	
United States	July 25, 2017	Contemporary hit radio	Original	Interscope	
United States	August 8, 2017	Rhythmic contemporary radio	Original	Interscope	
Various	August 23, 2017	Digital download	Galantis Remix	Interscope	
