= Scumbag (song) =

Single by Goody Grace featuring Blink-182

from the album Don’t Forget Where You Came From
- Released: October 30, 2019
- Genre: Pop punk; emo
- Length: 3:30
- Label: Bananabeat; Atlantic
- Songwriters: Travis Barker; Goody Grace; Tom Higgenson; Mark Hoppus; Joe Khajadourian; Michael Pollack; Alex Schwartz; Jake Torrey
- Producer: The Futuristics

Goody Grace featuring Blink-182 singles chronology
"Wasting Time" (2019)	"Scumbag" (2019)	"Hanging with Ghosts" (2020)

"Scumbag" is a song recorded by Canadian singer-songwriter Goody Grace. The song was released on October 30, 2019, through Bananabeat Records and Atlantic Records, as a single. The song features the rock band Blink-182, and was produced by the production duo The Futuristics. It was written by Grace, Blink-182 bassist Mark Hoppus and drummer Travis Barker, as well as Futuristics members Joe Khajadourian and Alex Schwartz, songwriters Michael Pollack and Jake Torrey, and Tom Higgenson, best known as the frontman for rock band Plain White T's.

Commercially, "Scumbag" only charted in the U.S., where it peaked at number 28 on Billboard's Alternative Airplay chart.

== Background ==
Goody Grace first rose to prominence in the late 2010s, for his stylistic mix of hip hop and rock. He garnered an online audience with a series of cover songs, followed by his single "Two Shots", which preceded a deal with major-label Atlantic. Grace grew up listening to Blink-182, and viewed the collaboration as an "honor". He first interacted with the band's drummer, Travis Barker, backstage at a concert. The two exchanged information, and kept in touch using social media. Barker later invited the singer-songwriter to join the band on tour, and proposed they record together. Grace had been working on "Scumbag" with production team the Futuristics, and suggested Barker and Blink bassist Mark Hoppus contribute to it as well. Hoppus assisted with developing the song's bridge.

The single was promoted as featuring Blink-182, though the band's guitarist at the time, Matt Skiba, is absent from the collaboration. The trio performed the single in an appearance on the late night talk show Jimmy Kimmel Live!, aired February 27, 2020.

=== Music video ===
The song's music video debuted alongside the single's premiere on October 30, 2019. Directed by Kyle Cogan and Kyle Dunleavy, the video depicts Grace struggling after a break-up, floating through the streets of his hometown of Selkirk, Manitoba. Hoppus and Barker appear in the video as well.

== Track listing ==
- Digital download
1. "Scumbag" (featuring Blink-182) – 3:30
- Acoustic
1. "Scumbag" – 3:29

=== Remixes ===
- MAKJ Remix
1. "Scumbag" (featuring Blink-182) – 2:46
- Absofacto Remix
1. "Scumbag" (featuring Blink-182) – 2:43

== Charts ==
Chart (2019–2020)	Peak position
US Alternative Airplay (Billboard)	28

== Release history ==
Country	Date	Format	Label
Various	October 30, 2019	Digital download	Bananabeat; Atlantic
Various	December 6, 2019	MAKJ Remix	Bananabeat; Atlantic
Various	January 7, 2020	Modern rock radio	Bananabeat; Atlantic
Various	January 9, 2020	Absofacto Remix	Bananabeat; Atlantic
Various	January 30, 2020	Acoustic	Bananabeat; Atlantic
