= Okokok =

Single by Jaira Burns

from the album Burn Slow
- Released: March 9, 2018
- Genre: Pop
- Length: 3:06
- Label: Interscope
- Songwriters: Robert McCurdy; Skyler Stonestreet; Christopher Petrosino
- Producer: Noise Club

Jaira Burns singles chronology
"High Rollin" (2017)	"Okokok" (2018)	"Sugarcoat" (2018)

"Okokok" is a song recorded by American singer-songwriter Jaira Burns. It was released on March 9, 2018, by Interscope Records as the second single from her debut extended play (EP) Burn Slow (2018). It was written by Robert McCurdy, Skyler Stonestreet, Christopher Petrosino and it was produced by Noise Club, and it talks about a cheating partner and about getting over the relationship. To promote the song, an accompanying music video for the track was released on May 2, 2018.

== Composition ==
"Okokok" was written by Robert McCurdy, Skyler Stonestreet, Christopher Petrosino and it was produced by Noise Club. Written in the key of D♭ major, "Okokok" has a tempo of 134 beats per minute. Lyrically, the song talks about a cheating partner and about getting over the relationship. "Okokok" draws influences from the hip hop and pop music genres.

== Critical reception ==
Michael Love Michael from Papermag listed "Okokok" as one of the "10 songs you need to start your weekend right" saying "the breezy pop track, is full of catchy tropical sounds and sweetly detached vocals from Burns that will have you dreaming of a drop-top summer." Mike Wass from Idolator described the track as "an explosion of pop hooks with hip-hop-influenced production".

== Music video ==
The video for "Okokok" was directed by Lucy Sandler. It was released on May 2, 2018, via Burns' VEVO channel. The music video starts with Burns sitting at the edge of the bed while her lover is sleeping. She then realises that he will not change and she starts dancing and singing until the background switches to a red background with roses and other colorful visuals. Towards the end, when she comes back to reality, she takes her bag and leaves the room.

== Credits and personnel ==
Credits adapted from Tidal.

- Jaira Burns − vocals
- Robert McCurdy − songwriter
- Skyler Stonestreet − songwriter
- Christopher Petrosino − songwriter
- Noise Club − producer
- Chris Gehringer − mastering engineer, studio personnel
- Gavin Finn − engineer, studio personnel
- Tony Maserati − mixer, studio personnel
