= Bad Liar (Selena Gomez song) =

2017 single by Selena Gomez

Single by Selena Gomez
- Released: May 18, 2017
- Studio: Interscope (Santa Monica, California)
- Genre: Pop rock; alternative pop
- Length: 3:34
- Label: Interscope
- Songwriters: Selena Gomez; Justin Tranter; Julia Michaels; Ian Kirkpatrick; David Byrne; Chris Frantz; Tina Weymouth
- Producer: Ian Kirkpatrick

Selena Gomez singles chronology
"It Ain't Me" (2017)	"Bad Liar" (2017)	"Fetish" (2017)

Music video
- "Bad Liar" on YouTube

"Bad Liar" is a song by American singer Selena Gomez, released on May 18, 2017, by Interscope Records. It appears as an international bonus track on Gomez's third studio album, Rare (2020). The track was written by Gomez, Justin Tranter, Julia Michaels, and its producer Ian Kirkpatrick. The song interpolates the bassline from Talking Heads' 1977 single "Psycho Killer", written by David Byrne, Chris Frantz and Tina Weymouth. A vertical music video accompanied the release, becoming the first music video to premiere on Spotify, where it was made available exclusively. The official music video directed by Jesse Peretz, was released on June 14, 2017, on Gomez's Vevo channel on YouTube, in which she portrays four characters.

"Bad Liar" received universal acclaim from music critics; Billboard ranked it as the best song of 2017. Critics noted the mid-tempo production for its non-traditional structure in Gomez's catalog. David Byrne, Talking Heads' lead singer, also complimented the song. Commercially, the song reached the top 10 in Lebanon and Mexico, the top 20 in Australia, Canada, the Czech Republic, Finland, Hungary, Malaysia, New Zealand, Slovakia, and the United States; and the top 40 in Austria, Denmark, France, Germany, Ireland, Norway, Portugal, Sweden, Switzerland, and the United Kingdom. In 2019, Rolling Stone ranked "Bad Liar" at number 39 on its list of best songs of the 2010s.

== Writing and development ==
"Bad Liar" was written by Selena Gomez, Justin Tranter, Julia Michaels and Ian Kirkpatrick. Its initial inspiration came from the American band Talking Heads of whom Gomez and Michaels are fans. During a session with Gomez and Tranter, Michaels suggested that they should write a song over the bassline of the band's 1977 single "Psycho Killer", specifically interpolating band member Tina Weymouth's riff. The minimal bassline from the song was used as a starting point for "Bad Liar" from which its topline melody developed. In an interview with Variety, Tranter recalled that it was "one of those magical moments where the song just comes together very quickly and felt so good." Warner/Chappell Music executive Greg Sowder played "Bad Liar" to Talking Heads member David Byrne who liked the track and Gomez's vocal performance, and along with Weymouth and Chris Frantz granted permission for it to sample "Psycho Killer".

== Composition and lyrical interpretation ==
"Bad Liar" has been described as a pop rock and alternative pop song and "slow-build tune", that has "roots in indie rock and new wave" and "pushed [Gomez] into indie pop territory". It begins with a steady beat built around rhythm and the jagged bassline from "Psycho Killer". The production is otherwise sparse and textured, featuring percussive snaps and handclaps. Unlike with Gomez's previous single "It Ain't Me" which made use of reverberation and pitch contouring, her voice is restrained and emphasized on "Bad Liar" by being mixed to limit and contain it. Her vocals are multitracked to emphasize urgency. With several lines in the song being acrostic and syllable-reliant, Gomez uses a spoken-sung cadence. The track is written in verse–chorus form, although it features both a pre-chorus and a post-chorus.

The lyrics find Gomez narrating events of avoiding to admit her feelings for a new love interest, but later conceding that the difficulty of it makes her a "bad liar". Upon release, "Bad Liar" was misinterpreted as a break-up song, prompting co-writer Justin Tranter to explain in a tweet, "You got some of the lyrics wrong, and it's actually about trying to hide magic feelings for someone new, but not being able to."

== Release and artwork ==
Gomez first teased the single's release on Twitter on May 3, 2017, sharing a link to her website where fans could sign up for updates though a mailing list. On May 5, 2017, a countdown to the release was launched on the website. "Bad Liar" was made available to be pre-saved on Spotify on May 16, 2017. The song's official lyrics were premiered on lyrics website Genius the following day. The singer also shared a short snippet of "Bad Liar" which received over 4.4 million views on Instagram in one day. The single was released to digital and streaming outlets at midnight EST on May 18, 2017.

Gomez worked with Canadian photographer Petra Collins for the single's promotional artwork. On May 11, 2017, the singer began sharing a series of images on social media featuring the song's title and lyrics written in lipstick across a bathroom mirror. The following day, Gomez posted the cover art for "Bad Liar" on Twitter. It features the song's title written in red lipstick across Gomez's one thigh as she lies on a bed of rocks in a periwinkle babydoll embroidered with flowers and butterflies. Maria Ward of Vogue magazine named Gomez's babydoll "the look of the summer", complimenting its embroidery and "easy, breezy style". An alternative cover art was shared by the singer on Instagram on May 17, 2017, showing her lying down wearing a small gauze bandage, and a yellow fall-risk hospital wristband given to patients who are at risk of falling due to lack of balance and weak muscles. According to Collins, the image was shot straight after Gomez came from hospital for a lupus treatment. Alex Frank of Pitchfork suggested that it referenced tabloid reaction to the singer's time in rehabilitation. Alex Kazemi of V magazine found the artwork powerful and vulnerable, regarding it as the most controversial imagery of a female singer since Fiona Apple's music video for "Criminal" (1997).

== Critical reception ==
"'Bad Liar' may have unlocked a new level of appreciation for Gomez, from those standing on the outside of her millions of fans and (sometimes) objectively highlighting her weaknesses. The single's avalanche of good press feels like a turning point in Gomez's artistic career."

— Jason Lipshutz, Billboard

"Bad Liar" received universal acclaim from music critics, with some deeming it Gomez's best song to date. Upon release, "Bad Liar" featured as Pitchfork's "Best New Track" with Alex Frank calling it "a victory for an uncomplicated pop star who makes uncomplicated pop music, and a fizzy fun track that will sound as good all summer". In his review for Rolling Stone, Elias Leight viewed the song as understated, clever and streamlined. Winston Cook-Wilson of Spin magazine found Gomez's vocals pristine and the track "charmingly weird", calling its lyrics and sample usage "harebrained but ultimately brilliant". He appreciated "Bad Liar" for eschewing contemporary radio trends, concluding that it "mostly just sounds like itself, and there's no higher compliment to pay it." Writing for Entertainment Weekly, Nolan Feeney opined that Gomez "found her lane, and she's racing full speed ahead to some of the most unexpected pop music of the year."

Jon Caramanica of The New York Times regarded the song among the most signature of Gomez's career, describing it as "deceptively original" and "determinedly anti-glossy, as if early DFA Records had tried to reverse engineer a pop song." Caramanica complimented Gomez's singing technique, writing that she "sings sweetly and with clever approaches to rhythm. She doesn't have much power in her voice, but she makes up for that with smart inflections." Joe Lynch of Billboard called it "one of the best and most refreshing pop songs of 2017 so far" and "an addictive instant classic unlike anything else on the radio." Raisa Bruner of Time magazine wrote the song was a "dramatic departure from [Gomez's] previous work" and "a surprisingly subtle pop song that builds effectively to hit status." In 2019, Rolling Stone ranked "Bad Liar" at number 39 on its list of best songs of the 2010s.

Many music publications included "Bad Liar" on their lists of the best songs of 2017. Billboard ranked it first on its year-end list, while The Guardian ranked it fourth, The Washington Post fifth, Time eighth, and Entertainment Weekly and NME tenth. It was also listed by Rolling Stone, The Fader, Pitchfork, NPR, PopMatters, Popjustice, Spin, Fact and Noisey.

The song later appeared on retrospective lists. Rolling Stone ranked it 39th on its list of the 100 best songs of the 2010s, and Billboard included it on a 2021 list of notable song interpolations from the 21st century.

== Music videos ==
=== Spotify video ===
A music video premiered on Spotify's mobile app on May 18, 2017. It was shot in November 2016 after Gomez went back from her treatment and it was the first video to premiere as a Spotify exclusive. The low fidelity video features Gomez wearing the same fall-risk wristband from the single's alternative cover art. She is shown writhing on a bed in a pink negligee with a white ribbon binding her hands.

=== Official video ===
==== Development and conception ====
The official video was directed by Jesse Peretz, who had not directed a music video since the Foo Fighters' 2007 single "Long Road to Ruin". It was produced by Black Dog Films and Lighthouse Management+Media. On June 12, 2017, Gomez announced via her social media that the second and official music video for the song would be released on June 14, 2017, posting three film posters in different colors. Mike Wass of Idolator noted that since the posters show "Selena Gomez" as the main star three times, he expected "her to play multiple characters or simply be the only person in it". On June 14, 2017, the music video for the song was uploaded to YouTube. Speaking about the video to Billboard, Kari Perkins (who served as costume designer) said:

For Selena's main character, we wanted to make her like a cool-but-sweet kid that didn't really fit in. For the mom, I wanted to do something more extreme – I wanted her to be more put-together, more of a worldly woman. For the gym teacher – Farrah Fawcett was our inspiration for that character. She was just so iconic and so beautiful at the time; everyone wanted to be like her. And finally, for the male figure, that was really fun; especially finding something that would actually fit Selena because she's so tiny.

==== Synopsis ====
The video sees Gomez playing four different characters: a female gym teacher, a schoolgirl, a male teacher (also the schoolgirl's father), and the girl's mother.

The music video for "Bad Liar" is set in 1978 and features Gomez as "a shy high schooler, a gym coach with a Farrah Fawcett-inspired coif, a bespectacled male teacher, and a mom, all of whom are interconnected in unexpected ways." It begins with a teenage-like Gomez riding a bike to school. There, she moves separately from the rest of students, who gossip about her in the hall. In class, she sees two of her teachers, an attractive blonde gym teacher and a grown-up man with big glasses (both played by Gomez), flirting outside, and later on the stairs and in the gym class. When the school day is done, the male teacher's wife (also played by Gomez) arrives, impatient to pick him up. Once they get home for dinner, the wife looks at him accusingly. The two glare at each other as teenage-like Gomez enters the house, revealing to be their daughter. She goes straight to her room, where she dances to the rhythm of the song's final refrain, but as soon as she hears her mother coming, she pretends to be sleeping until her mother leaves. The video concludes with a shot of the girl looking at a photograph of the gym teacher smiling, revealing that she secretly has feelings for her. Gomez also teased her follow-up single "Fetish" through a short clip which debuted at the end of the music video.

==== Reception ====
Mike Wass of Idolator described the video as "a breath of fresh air at a time when the hot trend in music videos is dying tragically" and stated that he was "glad to see [Gomez] really go for it visually", adding that it was "her biggest production since the Stars Dance era when 'Come & Get It' and 'Slow Down' took her to exotic locations." Alyssa Bailey of Elle complimented Gomez's performance, writing that she "may not be back to acting quite yet, but this mini-movie/music video situation definitely makes you want more", while Emily Mae Czachor of the Los Angeles Times praised the video's visuals, stating: "With a directorial vision by Lemonheads bassist (and, more recently, TV director) Jesse Peretz, the video fuses a retro '70s aesthetic (Farrah Fawcett wigs and all) with an eerie, seductive atmosphere."

Sam Reed of The Hollywood Reporter wrote, "Regardless, all of this means that the pop star had the opportunity to get dolled up in the most incredible costumes and makeup, from a feathered Farrah Fawcett-style wig and gym shorts to a perfectly coiffed bouffant, to a stache that would make even Nick Offerman crack a smile. In a more mixed analysis, Erika Harwood of Vanity Fair stated: "Unfortunately, this leaves us with more questions than answers about the very plot-heavy video. Is this man the principal or a teacher? Is he the student's step-dad or biological dad? Is he cheating on his wife with the gym teacher? [...] There are no obvious answers to these questions, except that this music video could have cut a character." The music video achieved over 12 million views in its first 24 hours.

== Credits and personnel ==
Credits and personnel adapted from Rare album liner notes.

- Selena Gomez – lead vocals, songwriting
- Justin Tranter - songwriting
- Julia Michaels – background vocals, songwriting
- Ian Kirkpatrick – production, songwriting
- David Byrne - songwriting
- Christopher Frantz – songwriting
- Tina Weymouth – songwriting
- Benjamin Rice – vocal production
- Manny Marroquin – mixing
- Chris Galland – mixing assistance
- Robin Florent – mixing assistance
- Scott Desmarais – mixing assistance
- Chris Gehringer – mastering

Contains elements of "Psycho Killer", written by Christopher Frantz, Tina Weymouth and David Byrne, published by WB Music Corp.(ASCAP) and Index Music Inc. (ASCAP)

== Charts ==
=== Weekly charts ===
Chart (2017)	Peak position
Australia (ARIA)	13
Austria (Ö3 Austria Top 40)	27
Belgium (Ultratop 50 Flanders)	45
Belgium (Ultratip Bubbling Under Wallonia)	10
Canada Hot 100 (Billboard)	11
Canada CHR/Top 40 (Billboard)	25
CIS Airplay (TopHit)	192
Czech Republic Singles Digital (ČNS IFPI)	13
Denmark (Tracklisten)	38
Finland (Suomen virallinen lista)	20
France (SNEP)	105
Germany (GfK)	36
Guatemala Anglo (Monitor Latino)	4
Hungary (Rádiós Top 40)	32
Hungary (Stream Top 40)	10
Ireland (IRMA)	23
Italy (FIMI)	47
Lebanon (The Official Lebanese Top 20)	8
Malaysia (RIM)	14
Mexico (Mexico Airplay)	6
Mexico Ingles Airplay (Billboard)	4
Netherlands (Single Top 100)	43
New Zealand (Recorded Music NZ)	17
Norway (VG-lista)	28
Portugal (AFP)	24
Scotland Singles (Official Charts)	17
Slovakia Airplay (ČNS IFPI)	58
Slovakia Singles Digital (ČNS IFPI)	8
Spain (Promusicae)	51
Sweden (Sverigetopplistan)	23
Switzerland (Schweizer Hitparade)	31
UK Singles (Official Charts)	21
US Billboard Hot 100	20
US Adult Pop Airplay (Billboard)	30
US Pop Airplay (Billboard)	13

=== Year-end charts ===
Chart (2017)	Position
Australia (ARIA)	80
Brazil (Pro-Música Brasil)	161
Canada (Canadian Hot 100)	69

== Certifications ==
Region	Certification	Certified units/sales
Australia (ARIA)	3× Platinum	210,000^{‡}
Brazil (Pro-Música Brasil)	3× Platinum	180,000^{‡}
Canada (Music Canada)	3× Platinum	240,000^{‡}
Denmark (IFPI Danmark)	Gold	45,000^{‡}
France (SNEP)	Gold	100,000^{‡}
Italy (FIMI)	Gold	25,000^{‡}
New Zealand (RMNZ)	Platinum	30,000^{‡}
Norway (IFPI Norway)	Platinum	60,000^{‡}
United Kingdom (BPI)	Gold	400,000^{‡}
United States (RIAA)	Platinum	1,000,000^{‡}
Streaming
Sweden (GLF)	Gold	4,000,000^{†}
^{‡} Sales+streaming figures based on certification alone.^{†} Streaming-only figures based on certification alone.

== Release history ==
Region	Date	Format	Version	Label	Ref.
Various	May 18, 2017	Digital download	Original	Interscope	
United States	May 23, 2017	Contemporary hit radio	Original	Interscope	
Italy	June 23, 2017	Contemporary hit radio	Original	Universal	
Various	November 17, 2017	Digital download	Grant Remix	Interscope	
