= Goody Grace =

Canadian musician and producer (born 1997)

- Born: June 19, 1997 (age 29); Selkirk, Manitoba, Canada
- Genres: Rock; hip hop; pop
- Occupations: Musician; record producer
- Instruments: Vocals, guitar
- Years active: 2015–present
- Label: Atlantic

Goody Grace (born Branson Gudmundson; June 19, 1997), is a Canadian musician and record producer from Selkirk, Manitoba. He has released one full-length album and two EPs, as well as having co-written songs for musicians such as Machine Gun Kelly and Cody Simpson. He first gained popularity in the early 2010s as a rapper, and has since evolved his sound to include elements of pop, rock, and alternative music. Grace has released a number of successful singles, including "Two Shots" and "Scumbag".

== Early life ==
Grace was born on June 19, 1997, in Selkirk, Manitoba, to parents of Icelandic descent. He first became interested in playing music at four years old, and began recording and producing music at nine, attempting to recreate the production sound of Juicy J and his group Three 6 Mafia. In his teens would cover artists including Taylor Swift and the Weeknd.

== Career ==
At seventeen Grace moved to Los Angeles and soon began touring the West Coast of the United States with Gnash. The following year he legally changed his name to Goody Grace. In 2015, he wrote "Flower" by Cody Simpson and featured on Gnash's song "That One Song", Huey Mack's song "Things Change". He released his debut single "Memories" in November 2015, eventually catching the attention of the Neighbourhood vocalist Jesse Rutherford. Soon after, a version of "Memories" was released featuring Rutherford. In the following years he featured on Hoodie Allen's song "Heartbreak" and Gnash's song "Two Shots".

March 16, 2018, he released the single "In the Light of the Moon", featuring Lil Aaron. His debut EP "Infinite" was released on March 22, 2018, through Atlantic Records. On July 27, 2018, he released the single "Too High" featuring Jesse Rutherford. On October 10, 2018, he released the single "Girls In The Suburbs Singing Smiths Songs", featuring G-Eazy. On November 18, 2018, Grace opened for Blink-182 at Palms Casino Resort in Las Vegas.

On July 26, 2019, he released the single "Wasting Time". On October 30, 2019, Grace released the single "Scumbag" featuring Blink-182, which was accompanied by a music video, directed by Kyle Cogan and Kyle Dunleavy. The single was promoted as "featuring Blink-182", though the band's guitarist, Matt Skiba, was absent from the collaboration. On February 27, 2020, they performed the song on Jimmy Kimmel Live!.

Grace co-wrote Machine Gun Kelly's song "Why Are You Here", which was released on December 18, 2019. On January 29, 2020, he was featured on Yung Pinch's song "Hanging With Ghosts", which also featured Good Charlotte. On April 23, 2020, he released the single "If I Want To". On April 26, Grace was featured on Mod Sun's single "Stay Away", which also featured Machine Gun Kelly. After a performance in Memphis, Tennessee supporting Project Pat, Grace was introduced to Juicy J. On August 21, 2020, the pair released the song "Nothing Good" together along with G-Eazy. He featured Lily Kershaw's song "Now & Then", which was released on October 10, 2020.

== Musical style and influences ==
Grace's music contains elements of punk rock, hip hop, folk and pop music, and has been variously called a rapper, a pop singer and a rock musician. The Guardian called him an "emo rocker", and a 2019 article from Alternative Press stated that he "graduated from the school of punk rock, but now he’s fast approaching the top of alt-pop".

In a 2018 interview with Alternative Press, Grace described his music as "A kind of modern evolution of music like blink-182".

He has cited influences including My Chemical Romance, Tom Waits, Glenn Danzig, Morrissey, Blink-182, the Misfits, Three 6 Mafia, Lil Wayne and Bob Dylan.

== Discography ==
=== Studio albums ===
Title	Album details
Don’t Forget Where You Came From	Released: February 26, 2021; Label: Atlantic Records

=== Extended plays ===
Title	Album details
Infinite	Released: March 23, 2018; Label: Atlantic Records
Nostalgia Kills	Released: September 30, 2021; Label: Atlantic Records

=== Singles ===
List of singles as featured artist, with chart positions, showing year released and album name
Title	Year	Peak chart positions	Album
Title	Year	US Alt.	Album
"Memories"	2015	—	Non-album singles
"Memories" (featuring Jesse Rutherford)	2016	—	Non-album singles
"So, What Does This All Mean"	2016	—	Non-album singles
"In the Light of the Moon" (featuring Lil Aaron)	2018	—	Infinite
"Too High" (featuring Jesse Rutherford)	2018	—	Non-album singles
"Two Shots" (featuring Gnash)	2018	—	Infinite
"Girls In The Suburbs Singing Smiths Songs" (featuring G-Eazy)	2018	—	Non-album singles
"Nostalgia is a Lie"	2018	—	Non-album singles
"Rest Your Eyes"	2018	—	Non-album singles
"Wasting Time"	2019	—	Non-album singles
"Scumbag" (featuring Blink-182)	2019	28	Don’t Forget Where You Came From
"If I Want to"	2020	—	Non-album singles
"Nothing Good" (featuring G-Eazy and Juicy-J)	2020	—	Don’t Forget Where You Came From
"—" denotes items which were not released in that country or failed to chart.
