= Burn Slow (Jaira Burns song) =

Single by Jaira Burns

from the album Burn Slow
- Released: August 11, 2017
- Length: 3:12
- Label: Interscope
- Songwriters: Carlos Battey; Charles Stephens III; Ryan Matthew Tedder; Michelle Elaine Buzz; Jaira Burns
- Producers: Charles Stephens III; Ryghteous Ryan

Jaira Burns singles chronology
"Ugly" (2017)	"Burn Slow" (2017)	"High Rollin" (2017)

"Burn Slow" is a song recorded by American singer-songwriter Jaira Burns. It was released on August 11, 2017, by Interscope Records as the lead single from her debut extended play (EP) of the same name. An accompanying music video for the track was released on September 6, 2017.

== Composition ==
"Burn Slow" was written by Charles Stephens III, Ryan Matthew Tedder, Carlos Battey, Michelle Elaine Buzz, Jaira Burns and produced by the first two. Written in the key of A♭ minor, "Burn Slow" has a tempo of 90 beats per minute. Lyrically, the song talks about smoking weed, she also said "This song represents so much about me, especially the soft side that shows the beginning of a relationship, taking things slow and loving the vibes being shared, spark one up, and let's burn it slow." The song begins with the lines "A little crazy from the start/ Fires like this can tear the world apart/ I'd rather take a hit and fall/ Than never fuck it up with you at all" sung by Burns. During the chorus she sings "Baby, can we burn it slow-low-low-low-low-low-low-low?/ I don't wanna lose control-ol-ol-ol-ol-ol-ol-ol".

== Music video ==
The video for "Burn Slow" was directed by Alexandra Gavillet. It was released on September 6, 2017, via Burns' VEVO channel. It starts with scenes from the ending of the previous music video for "Ugly" with Burns lighting a cannabis joint in a car, the music video switches to a scene with Burns in the same position in a room with her lover smoking together.

== Credits and personnel ==
Credits adapted from Tidal.

- Jaira Burns − vocals, songwriter
- Carlos Battey − songwriter
- Charles Stephens III − songwriter, producer
- Ryan Matthew Tedder − songwriter, producer
- Michelle Elaine Buzz − songwriter
- Erik Madrid − mixer
- Jorge Gutierrez − assistant mixer
