= Ugly (Jaira Burns song) =

Single by Jaira Burns
- Released: June 16, 2017
- Genre: Pop
- Length: 3:21
- Label: Interscope
- Songwriters: Henry Walter; Alexandra Hughes; Brett McLaughlin; Mathieu Jomphe-Lepine
- Producers: Cirkut; Billboard

Jaira Burns singles chronology
"Ugly" (2017)	"Burn Slow" (2017)

"Ugly" is the debut single by American singer-songwriter Jaira Burns. It was released on June 16, 2017 by Interscope Records as a single. "Ugly" was featured in a commercial for Beats Electronics and Balmain headphone collaboration starring Kylie Jenner. It was written by Henry Walter, Alexandra Hughes, Brett McLaughlin, Mathieu Jomphe-Lepine and produced by Cirkut and Billboard. Lyrically, the song talks about a hookup gone wrong. To promote the song, an accompanying music video for the track was released on June 28, 2017. It peaked at number 13 on the Spotify U.S. Viral 50 chart.

== Composition ==
"Ugly" was written by Henry Walter, Alexandra Hughes, Brett McLaughlin, Mathieu Jomphe-Lepine and produced by Cirkut and Billboard. Written in the key of F♯ minor, "Ugly" has a tempo of 136 beats per minute. Lyrically, "Ugly" talks about a hookup gone wrong. Mike Wass from Idolator described the song as a "serious pop pedigree". During the chorus, she sings "As long as you love me, this could get ugly/ Yeah, baby, trust me, this could get ugly/ But it's fuckin' good, real fuckin' good/ It's fuckin' good, lovin' me like he should". On February 13, 2018 Genius released a video with the singer explaining the lyrics of the song, saying "When you're in a friends with benefits relationship, everything seems great. You only look at the things that you like, and it's a very sexual driven relationship. If you notice, it's not really talking about conversation and talking about heart-to-heart things. I'm talking about the physical attraction. That's really where it stems from."

== Music video ==
The music video for "Ugly" was directed by Wiissa. It was released on June 28, 2017, via Burns' VEVO channel. The visual was shot in Palm Springs, California on May 25, 2017. Burns said, "It was fun but also grueling to shoot in the desert sun in heels for hours." The music video starts with Burns dyeing her hair blue while a snippet of the song "Burn Slow" is playing. In the next scene, Burns is seen in a coin laundry stealing an elderly woman's pink furry coat and a Cadillac and escaping with the car in a desert street. She later arrives at a diner, but leaves without paying for her food. The video ends with Burns lighting a cannabis joint in the car.
