= Finabah =

Finabah is an Australian pop rock band. The band formed in high school (St Joseph's College) in Toowoomba, Queensland before moving to Brisbane in early 2008 to pursue their music.

The band's name refers to two Swedish slang terms; "fina" meaning cool, hip or fine and "bah" meaning "yeah?" Translated into English, it means "cool yeah?"

They have performed alongside The Used and Rise Against, to Wolfmother and Spiderbait

After the release of their most recent EP, Sugarcoat, Finabah's single "Everyone Jump (When They Tell You How High)" achieved commercial success winning the NA2R (New Artist to Radio) competition.

They have won 2 major radio contests including the 2009 'new artist to the radio' contest and more recently the Nova FM 'I am with the band' contest which earned them Air time on NOVA.
