= High Rollin =

Single by Jaira Burns
- Released: October 20, 2017
- Genre: Electro-R&B
- Length: 2:57
- Label: Interscope
- Songwriters: Alex Schwartz; Jaira Burns; Cara Salimando; Joe Khajadourian; Brett McLaughlin
- Producers: The Futuristics; Ryan Matthew Tedder (add.)

Jaira Burns singles chronology
| "Burn Slow" (2017) | "High Rollin" (2017) | "Okokok" (2018) |

"High Rollin" is a song recorded by American singer-songwriter Jaira Burns. It was released on October 20, 2017, by Interscope Records as a single. It was written by Alex Schwartz, Jaira Burns, Cara Salimando, Joe Khajadourian, Brett McLaughlin and it was produced by Ryan Matthew Tedder and The Futuristics. Lyrically, the song is about getting high. To promote the song, an accompanying music video for the track was released on December 6, 2017.

== Composition ==
"High Rollin" was written by Alex Schwartz, Jaira Burns, Cara Salimando, Joe Khajadourian, Brett McLaughlin and it was produced by Ryan Matthew Tedder and The Futuristics. Written in the key of E minor, "High Rollin" has a tempo of 96 beats per minute. It's an electro-R&B track. Lyrically, the song is about getting high. During the chorus, she sings "Soon as I get out of bed I/ Roll one and I smoke up/ Got to change my head/ Car wash, sittin' in my Benz/ I roll one and I smoke up/ Always keep it lit/ Cause we high rollin, high rollin".

== Music video ==
The video for "High Rollin" was directed by Matthew Dillon Cohen. It was released on December 6, 2017, via Burns' VEVO channel. The music video starts with Burns and her friends waking up after the party, they continue the same practice in the backyard during daytime.

== Credits and personnel ==
Credits adapted from Tidal.

- Jaira Burns − vocals, songwriter
- Alex Schwartz − songwriter, producer
- Cara Salimando − songwriter
- Joe Khajadourian − songwriter, producer
- Brett McLaughlin − songwriter
- Ryan Matthew Tedder − songwriter, producer
- Jaycen Joshua − mixer
