= Rage room =

Business where clients can destroy items in a room

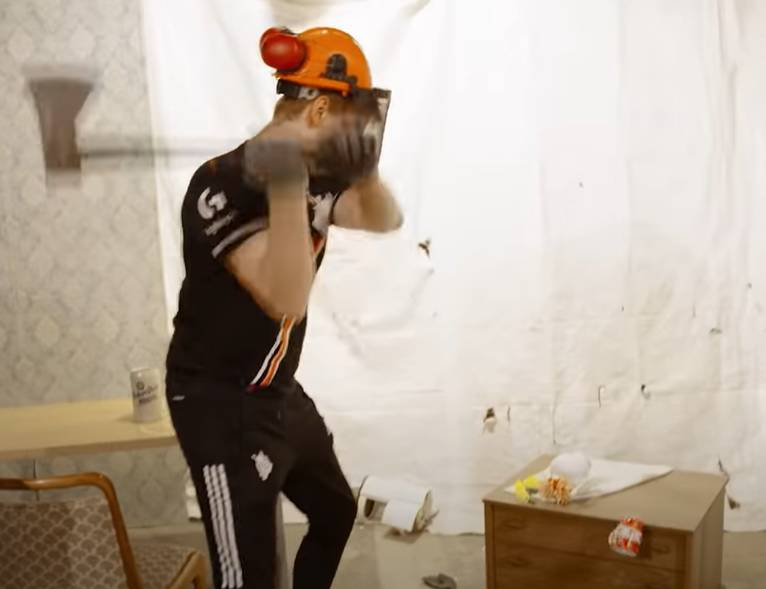
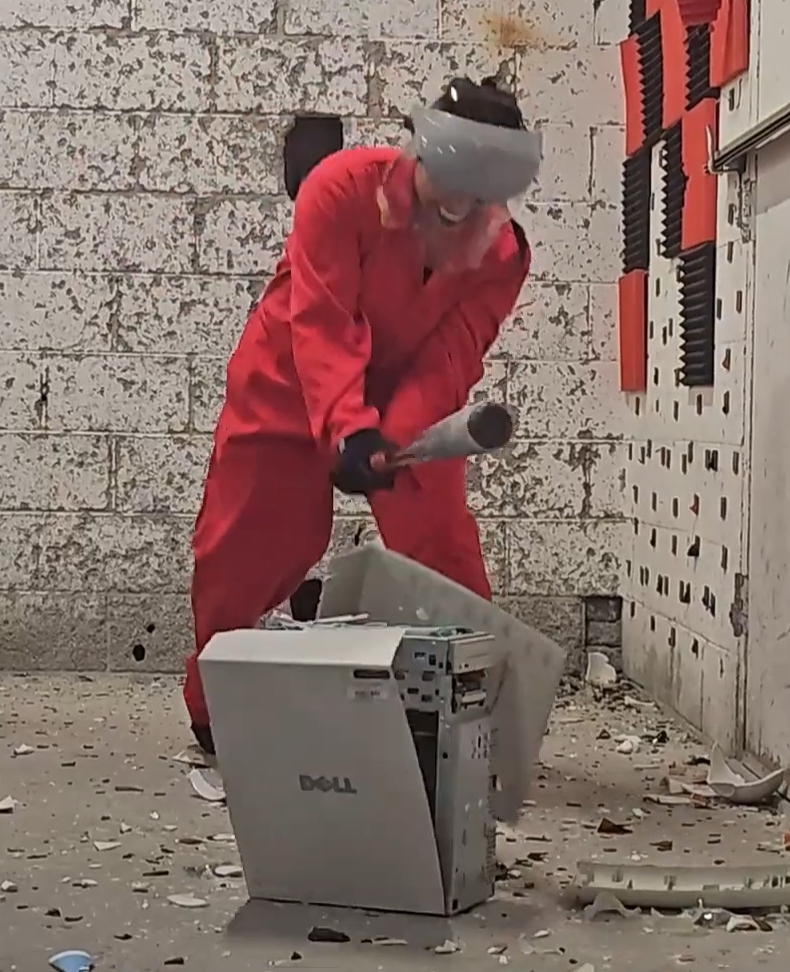
A man (left) swinging a hatchet at a cabinet and a woman beating a computer with a baseball bat

A rage room, also known as wreck room, smash room, or anger room, is a room where people can vent their rage by destroying objects. Firms offer access to such rooms on a rental basis.

Rage rooms may include living room and kitchen replicas with furnishings and items such as televisions, desks, small appliances and decorative items including earthenware and glassware. Clients may be allowed to bring their own possessions to destroy.

Rage rooms have spread across the world, beginning in 2009. They provide stress relief, with controversy over psychological effectiveness, and safety risks, requiring the use of protective gear.

== History ==
The first rage rooms were likely in Japan in 2008 or earlier. The concept has spread to other countries, such as Serbia, the United Kingdom, Austria, Argentina, Nigeria, and Canada. As of 2018, hundreds of rage rooms operated in cities across the United States.

Independently, Donna Alexander created an early rage room in her Dallas garage in 2008, using items abandoned on the street. She opened the Anger Room, a 1,000-square-foot Dallas warehouse in 2011. Alexander stated that she created the facility to combat violence by giving people a safe place to take out their aggressions.

In February 2021, Italian artist Colline di tristezza proposed to set up rage rooms and crying rooms in hospitals, nursing homes, and schools to decrease the risk of staff burnout.

== Effectiveness ==
Rage rooms hold controversy for their effectiveness within the psychology field. Some psychologists believe rage rooms give only a temporary fix with inadequate emotional management, and argue that they may lead to more aggression later on, such as encouraging violence outside the room and intensifying anger and violence within individuals, especially those with anger issues. Other psychologists believe that expressing anger in a rage room is healthy, giving short-term relief. For the most part, rage rooms are better at stress relief than at dealing with actual anger or rage violently. Some of the stress-relieving effect may be due to the physical exercise involved.

== Safety ==
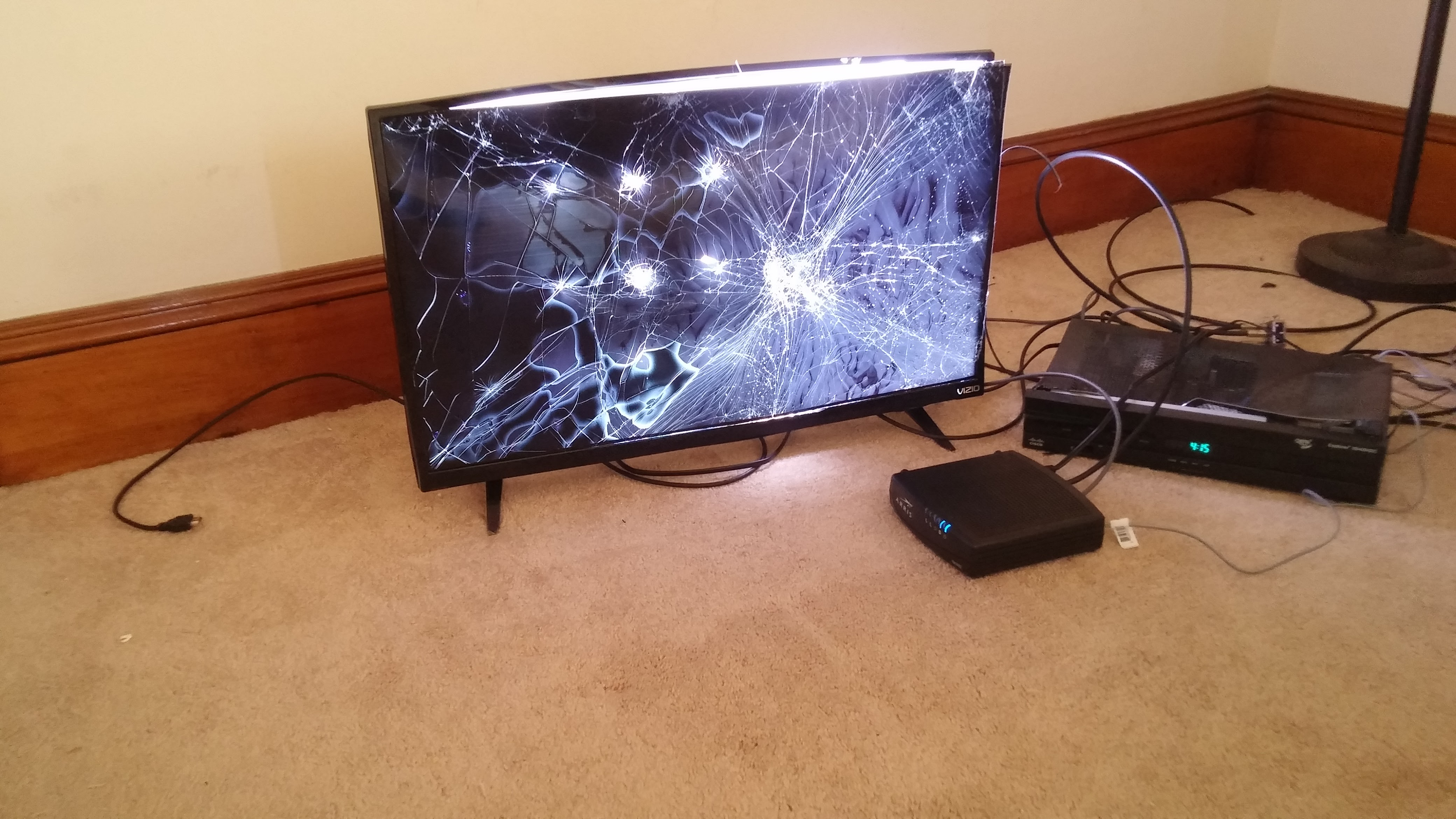
Smashing electronics can cause environmental damage and expose people to the toxic chemicals inside the device.

While rage rooms provide a relatively safe place for destroying things, risks include slipping and falling, flying debris from items being smashed, and emotional injury. Because of this, establishments require participants to wear safety gear such as eye protection, coveralls, and gloves, and to sign a liability waiver.

Depending upon the objects being destroyed, participants and especially the workers, who have all-day, everyday exposure to both airborne particles and contact from cleaning up the mess afterwards, may be exposed to toxic chemicals, such as the mercury in old electronics, lead in leaded glass, and lithium in lithium ion batteries. High-risk items include fluorescent light bulbs, batteries, and CRT screens (such as found in older televisions). These may cause effects on the environment, such as fires and explosions, if standard precautions are not followed.

As of 2023, local governments are beginning to prohibit the smashing of electronics in rage rooms to protect the environment, including Los Angeles.
