= Buzzkill (album) =

2025 studio album by Lyn Lapid

Studio album by Lyn Lapid
- Released: April 25, 2025
- Genre: Indie pop
- Length: 33:41
- Label: Mercury
- Producer: Hazey Eyes; LEXIM; Alex Goldblatt; Davin Kingston; Jason Suwito; Pom Pom; Peter Thomas; Starsmith; Ryan Marrone; Sam de Jong; Afterhrs; Oak; Dan Farber

Lyn Lapid chronology
Winter Wishes (2024)	Buzzkill (2025)

Alternative cover
- Buzzkill (Forever)

Singles from Buzzkill
- 1. "Buttons" Released: October 25, 2024; 2. "Coraline" Released: January 31, 2025; 3. "I'll Be Happy When" Released: February 28, 2025; 4. "Death Wish" Released: March 28, 2025

Buzzkill is the debut studio album by the American singer-songwriter Lyn Lapid, released on April 25, 2025 through Mercury. It follows her 2023 EP To Love in the 21st Century and was supported by four singles, "Buttons", "Coraline", "I'll Be Happy When", and "Death Wish". On September 19, 2025, she released a deluxe edition, Buzzkill (Forever).

== Background and recording ==
Lyn Lapid released her third EP, To Love in the 21st Century, in 2023. She was inspired to create Buzzkill after moving from her hometown in Maryland to Los Angeles, California. Lapid barely knew anyone there aside from her roommates, and it was hard for her to make friends at places such as parties. She described herself as a "buzzkill" because "it seemed like [she] had always brought the mood down." She later realized that she should not force herself into surface-level friendships and try to find meaningful connections. She wrote the album over a year and a half.

== Production and composition ==
=== Overview ===
The album is primarily an indie pop album. It details Lyn Lapid's feelings with loneliness, alienation, and her eventual self-acceptance. She also ventures more into different genres, with songs touching on alternative rock, jazz and R&B. In comparison to To Love in the 21st Century, her last major project, Buzzkill makes use of more piano elements than ukulele. Olivia Dean and Sarah Kinsley were an influence to Lapid on the album.

=== Songs ===
The opening track, "Buzzkill", is a bossa nova song set over guitar that details Lapid regretting showing up to a party. "Coraline" expresses the feeling of starting over in somewhere new, with an eerie feeling. "I'll Be Happy When" shows Lapid's longing for a deeper relationship over piano and a "glitchy beat". The closing track, "It Doesn't Kill Me Anymore", is a slow ballad that talks about healing after a breakup and loneliness.

== Release and promotion ==
Lyn Lapid released announced Buzzkill on February 28, 2025, concurrently releasing the third single from the album, "I'll Be Happy When". On March 4, she announced the Buzzkill World Tour in support of the album from May to June. On March 28, she released the fourth single, "Death Wish". Although the title track, "Buzzkill" was not a single, it did feature a music video.

On August 8, Lapid hinted at the album receiving a deluxe release after asking for title ideas on X. This would come to fruition on September 12, when Lapid announced the deluxe edition of the album, Buzzkill (Forever), which includes four additional tracks. It released on September 19.

== Track listing ==
Buzzkill track listing
No.	Title	Writer(s)	Producer(s)	Length
1.	"Buzzkill"	Grace Enger; Katelyn Lapid; Thomas Michel	Hazey Eyes	2:35
2.	"Coraline"	Alex Goldblatt; Christna Galligan; Lapid; Lucas Sim	LEXIM; Alex Goldblatt	2:49
3.	"Back Up Plan"	Annie Schindel; Davin Kingston; Lapid	Davin Kingston	2:54
4.	"I'll Be Happy When"	Em Beihold; Jason Suwito; Lapid; Nick Lopez	Jason Suwito	3:43
5.	"Floater Friend"	Schnidel; Lapid; Michel	Hazey Eyes	3:22
6.	"Forecast"	Cal Shapiro; Lapid; Kellen Pomeranz	Pom Pom	2:43
7.	"Death Wish"	Alisa Xayalith; Lapid; Peter Thomas	Peter Thomas	2:50
8.	"Buttons"	Finlay Dow-Smith; Steph Jones; Lapid	Starsmith	2:07
9.	"Fix"	Lapid; Lauren Aquilina; Ryan Marrone	Ryan Marrone	2:57
10.	"Who"	Lapid; Sam de Jong; Skyler Stonestreet	Sam de Jong	3:04
11.	"Take Me As I Am"	Andrew Haas; Deza; Ian Franzino; Lapid	Afterhrs	2:44
12.	"It Doesn't Kill Me Anymore"	Lapid; Oscar Linnander; Sarah Solovay; Warren Felder	Oak	2:39
Total length:				33:41

Buzzkill (Forever) track listing
No.	Title	Writer(s)	Producer(s)	Length
13.	"High Note"	Lapid; Galligan; Dan Farber	Dan Farber	2:59
14.	"White Flag"	Lapid; Lisa Scinta; Thomas	Peter Thomas	3:36
15.	"Settle"	Lapid; Khal; Sim	Lucas Sim; Alex Goldblatt	2:34
16.	"You"	Schindel; Pomeranz; Lapid	PomPom	3:19
Total length:				46:08

Notes

- All tracks are stylized in lowercase.
