= Lyn Lapid =

American singer-songwriter (born 2002)

- Born: Katelyn Lapid; October 24, 2002 (age 24)
- Occupations: Singer; songwriter; producer

TikTok information
- Page: lynlapid
- Followers: 4.8 million
- Musical career
- Genres: Pop; indie pop; bedroom pop; alternative R&B
- Instruments: Vocals; piano; violin; guitar; ukulele
- Years active: 2019–present
- Labels: Republic; Mercury
- Website: lynlapidmusic.com

Katelyn Lapid (born October 24, 2002), known professionally as Lyn Lapid, is a Filipino-American singer-songwriter. She was a member of vocal collective Earcandy. Her debut album, Buzzkill, was released on April 25, 2025. She plays the ukulele.

== Biography ==
=== Early life ===
Lapid is a second-generation Filipino-American born to naturalized American citizens who immigrated from the Philippines. She studied classical piano and played violin in an orchestra for seven years before starting to make covers. She attended Atholton High School in Columbia, Maryland.

=== Career ===
Lapid began releasing covers on YouTube and Instagram in 2018. She began writing original songs in February 2020.

In late 2020, Lapid gained popularity for her song "Producer Man", which is about her experience with a bad music producer. She released an a cappella version on TikTok, one verse at a time. She is signed to Republic Records. Her contract was transferred to Mercury Records, a split of Republic Records.

In January 2022, she was named as one of Shazam's top 5 artists to watch in 2022. She was featured in amplifyHER, a United Nations podcast. Throughout the 2020s, she gained more popularity through some of her other songs "In My Mind", "When She Loved Me" and "Poster Boy". Some of these songs were included on her extended plays In My Mind and The Outsider and to love in the 21st century in 2023; which later received a deluxe edition subtitled "the epilogue". It was supported by two tours.

Following another EP, Winter Wishes, Lapid began work on her debut studio album following her move to Los Angeles. The album, Buzzkill, released on 25 April 2025 to some success. It was supported by four singles and one promotional single, the two most successful ones being "Buttons" and "Coraline", the first two singles. The album later received a deluxe edition and was supported by a tour.

In March 2026, Lapid stated on X that she had been "lost at writing" since the production of Buzzkill, but her life had become eventful within the span of a fortnight, and she had enough material to fill up an album's worth of content. Throughout the rest of the year she had been teasing her demos on Instagram and letting fans vote for what tracks they wanted to hear on the finished project. She completed writing the project in June, and on 24 August 2026 she announced the lead single, "One Good Thing" out on 4 September.

== Influences ==
Lapid cites fellow Filipino artists Jessica Sanchez and 4th Impact as influences.

== Discography ==
=== Albums ===
- Buzzkill (2025)

=== EPs ===
- In My Mind (2021)
- Xmas 01 (2021)
- The Outsider (2022)
- to love in the 21st century (2023)
- to love in the 21st century: the epilogue (2023)
- Winter Wishes (2024)

=== Singles ===
==== As lead artist ====
List of singles
Title	Year	Album
"Producer Man	2020	Non-album singles
"Itsy Bitsy"	2021	Non-album singles
"When She Loved Me"	2021	Non-album singles
"Infinite"	2021	Non-album singles
"In My Mind"	2021	Non-album singles
"Messed Up on Christmas"	2021	Xmas 01
"Candy Cane Kisses"	2021	Xmas 01
"My Sunny Day" (with Ted Fresco)	2021	Non-album singles
"I Guess That Was Goodbye"	2022	The Outsider
"The Outsider"	2022	The Outsider
"My Sunny Day" (Kina Remix) (with Ted Fresco and Kina)	2022	Non-album singles
"Detached"	2022	Non-album singles
"Saturn"	2022	Non-album singles
"Do U Really?" (with Ruth B.)	2023	to love in the 21st century: the epilogue
"Poster Boy"	2023	to love in the 21st century: the epilogue
"Ok With It"	2023	to love in the 21st century: the epilogue
"East Side"	2023	to love in the 21st century: the epilogue
"Cruise Control" (with Whethan)	2024	Non-album singles
"Back from the Dead" (with Mxmtoon)	2024	Non-album singles
"Buttons"	2024	Buzzkill
"Coraline"	2025	Buzzkill
"I'll Be Happy When"	2025	Buzzkill
"Death Wish"	2025	Buzzkill
"Where Is My Mind?" (Cover Version)	2025	Non-album singles
"The Simlish Song"	2025	Non-album singles
"One Good Thing"	2026	Upcoming second album
"Casual Crime"	2026	Upcoming second album

==== As featured artist ====
Title	Year	Artist
"Wish I Didn't Care"	2024	Eric Nam

==== Collaborations ====
Title	Year	Album
”Room for You“ (with Grentperez)	2024	Non-album singles
