= Sizzy Rocket =

American singer

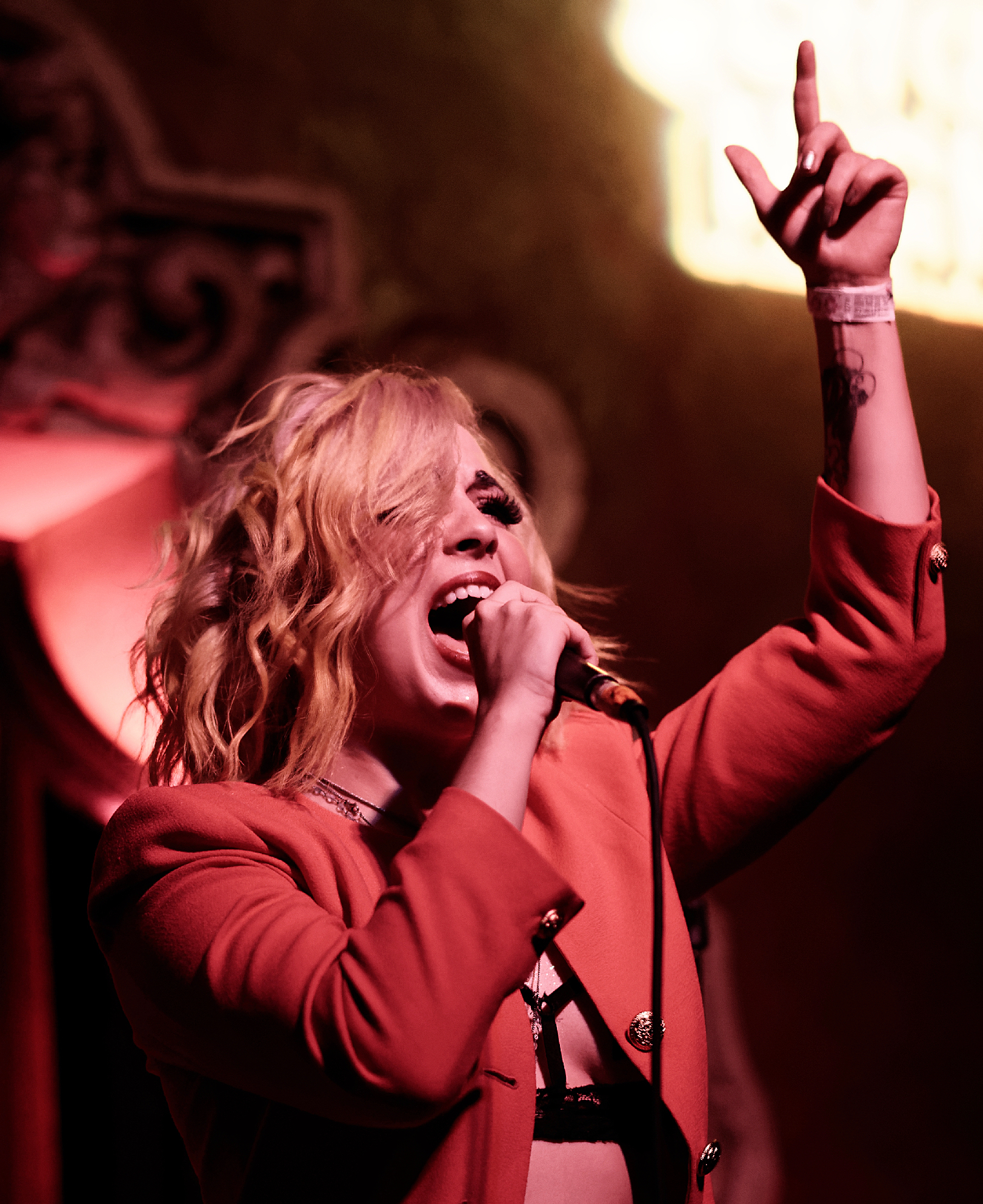
- Rocket in 2016

Background information
- Born: Sabrina Louise Bernstein; April 16, 1992 (age 34); Los Angeles, California, U.S.
- Genres: Pop; alternative; punk; indie
- Occupations: Singer; songwriter; producer
- Instruments: Vocals; piano; guitar
- Label: LOST CHRRRY Records
- Formerly of: Shiny Wet Machine
- Website: sizzyrocket.com

Sabrina Louise Bernstein, better known by her stage name Sizzy Rocket, is an American musician, singer, and songwriter. In 2016, she released her debut album, Thrills, and toured the record nationwide as direct support for Kitten. In the same year she started her first independent record label Diet Punk Records, now Lost Chrrry Records. On this new label, Rocket collaborated with The KickDrums to create a punk rock band called Shiny Wet Machine.

Rocket was raised in Las Vegas, Nevada. She attended Las Vegas Academy. While living in Las Vegas, she performed at the city's Bite of LV Festival, House of Blues, and opened for Imagine Dragons. She was also a semi-finalist on the NBC reality television show America's Got Talent.

After finishing high school, Rocket moved to New York to attend New York University's Clive Davis School of Music. She attended for three years before leaving the program. Her work with various producers lead to a publishing deal with Universal Music Group, where she has since written with artists including Noah Cyrus, Uffie, and Flosstradamus.

On June 14, 2019, Rocket independently released her second album Grrrl.

On September 25, 2020, Rocket released her third album ANARCHY.[7] On December 15, 2020, she performed hit track songs from the album, including Spill My Guts and Smells Like Sex during a live-streamed concert entitled "ANARCHY: Come To Life" presented in collaboration with Moment House.[8] In January 2022, the voyeuristic music video for single Smells Like Sex was awarded by Playboy and featured in their first ever NFT Exhibition, The Art of Gender and Sexuality.[9] On March 26, 2021, Rocket released The Bitch EP, which included collaborations with UPSAHL and Mothica.

On November 11, 2022, Rocket released a mixtape titled Live Laugh Love. On October 13th, 2023, Rocket released RAT, a 7-track EP.

== Discography ==
=== Albums ===
- Thrills (2016)
- Grrrl (2019)
- ANARCHY (2020)

=== Mixtapes ===
- Hot Summer (2017)
- Too Young To Die (2021)
- Live Laugh Love (2022)

=== Extended plays ===
- 30,000 ft (2011)
- Mulholland (2018)
- The Bitch EP (2021)
- RAT (2023)
- Rode Hard, Put Away Wet (2024)

=== Singles ===
- "Kingpin" (2015)
- "Queen" (Perfume Genius cover) (2015)
- "Dope" (2017)
- "Still" (2017)
- "Amphetamine" (2017)
- "Mulholland" (2018)
- "Real Life (Remix)" (2018)
- "High" (2018)
- "Harley" (2018)
- "Juicy Fruit" (2018)
- "SID VICIOUS" (2019)
- "DANG" (2019)
- "Grrrl: Punk Sessions - Single" (2019)
- "I KNOW WHAT U LIKE" (2019)
- "That Bitch" (2020)
- "Smells Like Sex" (2020)
- "Rollerskating" (2020)
- "Spill My Guts" (2020)
- "American Rage" (2021)
- "The World Is Burning" (2021)
- "Rebel Revolution" (2022)
- "Bubblegum" (2022)
- "MOMMY" (2023)
- "i'm just a grrrl" (2024)

=== Other projects ===
- Shiny Wet Machine (2016–present)
