= Jaira Burns =

American singer

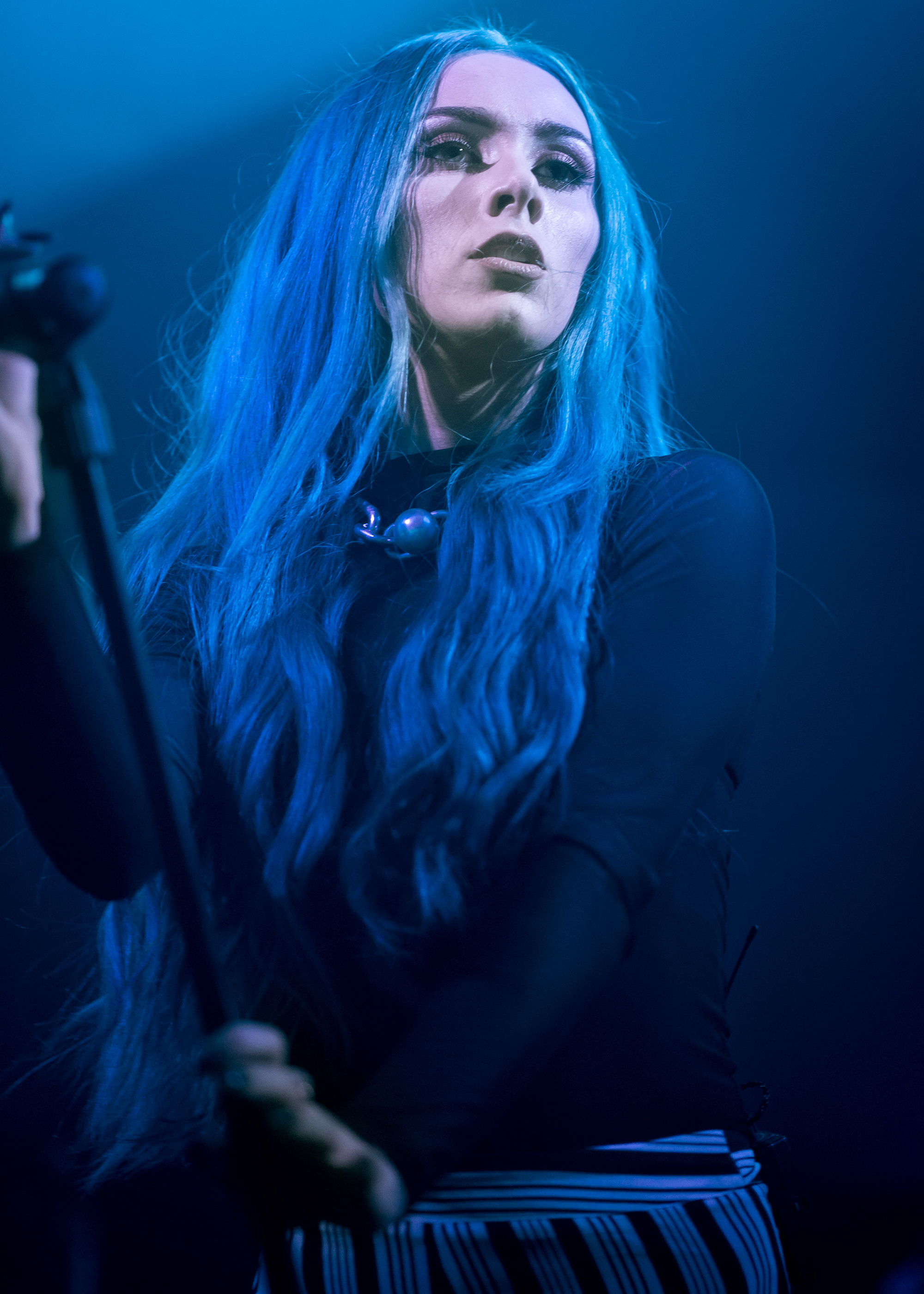
- Burns performing in 2017

Background information
- Born: January 14, 1997 (age 29); Vandergrift, Pennsylvania, U.S.
- Genres: Pop; reggae; hip hop; R&B
- Occupation: Singer
- Years active: 2015–present
- Labels: Interscope; Upscale
- Formerly of: K/DA
- Website: jairaburns.com

Jaira Burns (born January 14, 1997) is an American singer. She began her music career by uploading covers on YouTube. Burns made her debut in 2017 with the single "Ugly", which was featured in a commercial for Beats Electronics and Balmain headphone collaboration starring Kylie Jenner. She then released "Burn Slow" a few months later, which serves as the title track of her debut extended play, which was released in July 2018.

== Early life ==
Burns was born and grew up in Vandergrift, Pennsylvania, but later relocated to Los Angeles. She began singing at a young age, and learned guitar in her teenage years.

== Career ==
=== 2015: Career beginnings ===
Burns began her career by posting covers on YouTube, and booked her first meeting with a major record label in 2015.

=== 2017–2018: Debut and Burn Slow ===
Burns released her first single "Ugly" on June 16, 2017. The single received positive attention from critics, with Mike Wass of Idolator writing that Burns and the song had "serious pop pedigree." The single was featured in a commercial for Beats Electronics and Balmain headphone collaboration starring Kylie Jenner. She released her second single titled "Burn Slow" on August 11, 2017. It serves as the title track for Burn's debut extended play. She released "High Rollin" on October 20, 2017. The second single from Burn Slow, "Okokok", was released on March 9, 2018. "Sugarcoat" was released on May 11, 2018, as Burns's fifth single and the third from her debut extended play Burn Slow. The fourth and final single from Burn Slow, "Low Key In Love" was released on June 15, 2018. She released her first extended play, Burn Slow, on July 27, 2018. She featured on the single "Everyone Else" by Demo Taped, which was released on September 14, 2018. Burns collaborated with Soyeon and Miyeon from (G)I-DLE and Madison Beer as the virtual k-pop girl group K/DA for the single "Pop/Stars".

=== 2019–present: Upcoming debut studio album ===
Burns released the single "Numb" on January 10, 2019. She initially planned to release her debut studio album in 2019, though it remains unreleased. In 2019, she released the singles "Goddess", "Tip Back" and "Hard Liquor".

In 2020, she reprised her role as Kai'sa in K/DA for their EP All Out and she is featured on the song for the title track "More" along with the original lineup and Chinese singer Lexie Liu.

== Discography ==
=== Extended plays ===
Title	Details
Burn Slow	Released: July 27, 2018; Format: Digital download; Label: Interscope

=== Singles ===
==== As lead artist ====
Title	Year	Peak chart positions								Album
Title	Year	US Dig.	AUS Hit.	CAN Dig.	KOR	NZ Hot.	SCO	SWE Heat.	UK Down.	Album
"Ugly"	2017	—	—	—	—	—	—	—	—	Non-album single
"Burn Slow"	2017	—	—	—	—	—	—	—	—	Burn Slow
"High Rollin"	2017	—	—	—	—	—	—	—	—	Non-album single
"Okokok"	2018	—	—	—	—	—	—	—	—	Burn Slow
"Sugarcoat"	2018	—	—	—	—	—	—	—	—	Burn Slow
"Low Key in Love"	2018	—	—	—	—	—	—	—	—	Burn Slow
"Pop/Stars" (with (G)I-dle and Madison Beer as K/DA)	2018	30	2	30	39	6	82	4	75	Non-album singles
"Numb"	2019	—	—	—	—	—	—	—	—	Non-album singles
"Goddess"	2019	—	—	—	—	—	—	—	—	Non-album singles
"Hard Liquor"	2019	—	—	—	—	—	—	—	—	Non-album singles
"Tip It Back"	2019	—	—	—	—	—	—	—	—	Non-album singles
"More" (with (G)I-dle, Madison Beer, Lexie Liu and Seraphine as K/DA)	2020	—	—	48	96	9	—	—	—	All Out
"Tesla X"	2021	—	—	—	—	—	—	—	—	Non-album singles
"Avocados"	2021	—	—	—	—	—	—	—	—	Non-album singles
"Over You" [31]	2023	—								

==== As featured artist ====
Title	Year	Album
"Everyone Else" (Demo Taped featuring Jaira Burns)	2017	Non-album singles
"Shiver" (Whole Doubts featuring Jaira Burns)	2019	Non-album singles
