= Nessa Barrett discography =

- Barrett in 2023
- Studio albums: 3
- EPs: 3
- Live albums: 1
- Singles: 27
- Music videos: 27

American singer-songwriter Nessa Barrett has released three studio albums, three extended plays (EPs), 27 singles and 27 music videos. Barrett released her debut single "Pain" on July 31, 2020, and her debut extended play Pretty Poison on September 10, 2021. Her single "I Hope Ur Miserable Until Ur Dead" debuted at number 88 on the Billboard Hot 100, marking her first song to chart in the country. In October 2022, Barrett released her debut studio album Young Forever through Warner Records. Her second extented play Hell Is a Teenage Girl followed in July 2023. Her second studio album, Aftercare was released in November 2024.

On March 20, 2026, Barrett released her third extended play, Jesus Loves a Primadonna. In July of that same year, she announced her third studio album, Tough Love, which was released on September 25, 2026. It became her first top-10 album, peaking at number 7 on the Australian Albums Chart.

== Studio albums ==
List of studio albums, with selected chart positions shown
Title	Album details	Peak chart positions									
Title	Album details	US	US Rock	AUS	BEL (FL)	CAN	IRE	LTU	NZ	SCO	UK
Young Forever	Released: October 14, 2022; Label: Warner; Formats: CD, CS, LP, digital download, streaming	80	13	63	94	45	49	—	39	—	89
Aftercare	Released: November 15, 2024; Label: Warner; Formats: CD, LP, digital download, streaming	98	—	67	124	—	91	99	—	16	— (Note: Aftercare did not enter the UK Albums Chart, but peaked at number 25 on the UK Albums Sales chart.)
Tough Love	Released: September 25, 2026; Label: Warner; Formats: CD, LP, digital download, streaming	137	38	7	104	—	—	—	37	18	— (Note: Tough Love did not enter the UK Albums Chart, but peaked at number 22 on the UK Albums Sales chart.)
"—" denotes items which were not released in that country or failed to chart.

== Live albums ==
List of live albums
Title	Album details
Aftercare Tour (Live in Los Angeles)	Released: August 15, 2025; Label: Warner; Formats: Digital download, streaming

== EPs ==
List of EPs, with selected chart positions shown
Title	EP details	Peak chart positions		
Title	EP details	US Heat.	AUS	SCO
Pretty Poison	Released: September 10, 2021; Label: Warner; Formats: CD, CS, LP, digital download, streaming	4	—	—
Hell Is a Teenage Girl	Released: July 14, 2023; Label: Warner; Formats: Digital download, streaming	—	—	—
Jesus Loves a Primadonna	Released: March 20, 2026; Label: Warner; Formats: CD, LP, digital download, streaming	—	41	67
"—" denotes items which were not released in that country or failed to chart.

== Singles ==
List of singles as lead artist with selected chart positions
Title	Year	Peak chart positions										Certifications	Album or EP
Title	Year	US	US Rock	BLR Air.	CAN	CIS Air.	IRE	NZ Hot	RUS Air.	UK	WW	Certifications	Album or EP
"Pain"	2020	—	—	*	—	—	—	21	—	— (Note: "Pain" did not enter the UK Singles Chart, but peaked at number 81 on the UK Video Streaming Chart.)	—		Non-album singles
"If U Love Me"	2020	—	—	*	—	—	—	—	—	—	—		Non-album singles
"La Di Die" (featuring Jxdn)	2021	—	11	29	—	8	45	9	2	—	—	RIAA: Gold; MC: Gold	Non-album singles
"I'm Dead" (featuring Jxdn)	2021	—	—	*	—	—	—	—	—	—	—		Non-album singles
"Counting Crimes"	2021	—	46	*	—	—	—	—	—	—	—		Non-album singles
"I Hope Ur Miserable Until Ur Dead"	2021	88	11	*	53	—	38	5	—	75	120	RIAA: Gold; MC: Gold; RMNZ: Gold	Pretty Poison
"Dying on the Inside"	2022	—	23	30	—	5	—	14	3	—	—		Non-album single
"Die First"	2022	—	14	*	86	—	81	15	—	—	—	RIAA: Gold; MC: Gold	Young Forever
"Madhouse"	2022	—	—	*	—	—	—	—	—	—	—		Young Forever
"Tired of California"	2022	—	49	*	—	—	—	—	—	—	—		Young Forever
"American Jesus"	2023	—	48	—	—	—	—	16	—	—	—		Hell Is a Teenage Girl
"Lie"	2023	—	41	—	—	—	—	18	—	—	—		Hell Is a Teenage Girl
"Club Heaven"	2023	—	47	—	—	—	—	14	—	—	—		Non-album singles
"Girl in New York"	2023	—	—	—	—	—	—	19	—	—	—		Non-album singles
"Passenger Princess"	2024	—	46	—	—	—	—	17	—	—	—		Aftercare
"Dirty Little Secret"	2024	—	—	—	—	—	—	26	—	—	—		Aftercare
"Disco" (featuring Tommy Genesis)	2024	—	—	—	—	—	—	—	—	—	—		Aftercare
"Mustang Baby" (featuring Artemas)	2024	—	39	—	—	—	—	39	—	—	—		Aftercare
"Pornstar"	2025	—	—	—	—	—	—	10	—	—	—		Aftercare
"Does God Cry?"	2025	—	—	—	—	—	—	—	—	—	—		Aftercare
"Love Looks Pretty on You"	2025	—	—	—	—	—	—	11	—	—	—		Aftercare
"High on Heaven"	2026	—	—	—	—	—	—	30	—	—	—		Jesus Loves a Primadonna
"Stay with Me"	2026	—	—	—	—	—	—	—	—	—	—		Jesus Loves a Primadonna
"Buffalo 66"	2026	—	—	—	—	—	—	—	—	—	—		Jesus Loves a Primadonna
"Too Fast to Live, Too Young to Die"	2026	—	—	—	—	—	—	18	—	—	—		Tough Love
"Bad Girls Never Die”	2026	—	—	—	—	—	—	—	—	—	—		Tough Love
"Tough Love"	2026	—	—	—	—	—	—	—	—	—	—		Tough Love
"—" denotes items which were not released in that country or failed to chart. "*" denotes the chart did not exist at that time.

== Other charted songs ==
List of other charted songs with selected chart positions
Title	Year	Peak chart positions				Album or EP
Title	Year	BLR Air.	CIS Air.	NZ Hot	RUS Air.	Album or EP
"Keep Me Afraid"	2021	187	157	—	121	Pretty Poison
"Pins and Needles"	2024	—	—	40	—	Aftercare
"—" denotes items which were not released in that country or failed to chart.

== Music videos ==
List of music videos, showing year released and directors
Title	Year	Director(s)	Album
"Pain"	2020	Bree Shepherd & Nessa Barrett	Non-album singles
"If U Love Me" (Note: "If U Love Me" is no longer available to watch on YouTube, but is available on other platforms.)	2020	Emma Syndey Menzies	Non-album singles
"La Di Die" (featuring Jxdn)	2021	Andrew Sandler	Non-album singles
"Counting Crimes"	2021	Andrew Sandler	Non-album singles
"I Hope Ur Miserable Until Ur Dead"	2021	Hannah Lux Davis	Pretty Poison
"Keep Me Afraid"	2021	Lorenzo Diego Carrera & Alex Bordoni	Pretty Poison
"Pretty Poison"	2021	Lorenzo Diego Carrera & Alex Bordoni	Pretty Poison
"I Wanna Die"	2021	Lorenzo Diego Carrera & Alex Bordoni	Pretty Poison
"Sincerely"	2021	Lorenzo Diego Carrera & Alex Bordoni	Pretty Poison
"Dying on the Inside"	2022	JakeTheShooter & Hunter Moreno	Non-album single
"Die First"	2022	Loris Russier	Young Forever
"Tired of California"	2022	Loris Russier	Young Forever
"Bang Bang!"	2023	Hunter Lyon	Hell Is a Teenage Girl
"American Jesus"	2023	Loris Russier	Hell Is a Teenage Girl
"Lie"	2023	Loris Russier	Hell Is a Teenage Girl
"Hell Is a Teenage Girl"	2023	Andrew Donoho	Hell Is a Teenage Girl
"Sick of Myself" (featuring Whethan)	2023	John Rizkallah & Janelle Brosnan	Life of a Wallflower, Vol. 2
"Club Heaven"	2023	Loris Russier	Non-album single
"Passenger Princess"	2024	Aerin Moreno	Aftercare
"Dirty Little Secret"	2024	Aerin Moreno	Aftercare
"Disco" (featuring Tommy Genesis)	2024	Aerin Moreno	Aftercare
"Mustang Baby" (featuring Artemas)	2024	Nessa Barrett	Aftercare
"Stay with Me"	2026	Kristen Jan Wong & Nessa Barrett	Jesus Loves a Primadonna
"Buffalo 66" (featuring Jesse Rutherford)	2026	Claire Bishara	Jesus Loves a Primadonna
"Too Fast to Live, Too Young to Die"	2026	Claire Bishara	Tough Love
"Bad Girls Never Die"	2026	Claire Bishara	Tough Love
"Tough Love"	2026	Claire Bishara	Tough Love
