= Young Forever Tour =

2023 concert tour by Nessa Barret

- Tour by Nessa Barrett
- Promotional poster
- Location: North America; Europe
- Associated album: Young Forever
- Start date: February 23, 2023
- End date: May 23, 2023
- Legs: 2
- No. of shows: 25
- Supporting acts: Isabel LaRosa; Briskin
- Website: nessa-barrett.com

Nessa Barrett concert chronology
- Young Forever Tour (2023); Church Club for the Lonely Tour (2023)

The Young Forever Tour was the debut tour of singer-songwriter Nessa Barrett. The tour was announced on December 13, 2022 in support of her debut album Young Forever. It began on February 22, 2023 at the Crescent Ballroom in Phoenix, Arizona ended on May 23, 2023 at the Le Trabendo in Paris, France. The tour consisted of dates across the United States, Canada, Germany, the Netherlands, France, and the United Kingdom. Isabel LaRosa and Daniel Briskin served as supporting acts for the North American and European legs respectively. Barrett sang a mixture of songs off her extended play Pretty Poison and debut album Young Forever.

The Young Forever Tour spanned 25 dates across North America and Europe, including three sold out shows in Los Angeles, California. It was met with positive reviews from both fans and critics. Critics described the tour as very "intimate", with Tessa Bannister of Euphonic Magazine highlighting that during the performance of "Die First", everyone held up single roses in remembrance of Barrett's friend Cooper Noriega, who passed away in June 2022. Barrett dedicated a portion of her set to the "Burn Box" project, where she burnt notes that fans had written before the show of words they needed to get "off their chest".

== Critical reception ==
Overall, reviews by critics were positive on the "Young Forever" tour. Alessandra Guarneri of Celeb Mix said "Barrett effortlessly captured each attendee’s attention from the moment she stepped on stage". Alex West of The Aquarian said that Nessa's performance at Terminal 5 in New York City "radiated confidence, power, and raw emotion". Catherine Goodman of The Emory Wheel was "astonished by her grace, her gratitude, and above all, her talent," and declared she was "now, without shame, a full-fledged Nessa Barrett fan". Emma Hiebert of The PCM Outlook complimented Barret's transitions between songs.

== Tour dates ==
North American leg
Date (2023)	City	Country	Venue	Opening act
February 22	Phoenix	United States	Crescent Ballroom	Isabel LaRosa
February 23	Phoenix	United States	Crescent Ballroom	Isabel LaRosa
February 25	Houston	United States	Rise Rooftop	Isabel LaRosa
February 26	Dallas	United States	House of Blues	Isabel LaRosa
February 28	Atlanta	United States	The Eastern	Isabel LaRosa
March 2	Philadelphia	United States	The Fillmore	Isabel LaRosa
March 3	Washington	United States	The Anthem	Isabel LaRosa
March 5	New York City	United States	Terminal 5	Isabel LaRosa
March 6	Boston	United States	Roadrunner	Isabel LaRosa
March 8	New York City	United States	Irving Plaza	Isabel LaRosa
March 9	New York City	United States	Irving Plaza	Isabel LaRosa
March 11	Toronto	Canada	Phoenix Concert Theatre	Isabel LaRosa
March 13	Chicago	United States	Aragon Ballroom	Isabel LaRosa
March 14	St. Paul	United States	Palace Theatre	Isabel LaRosa
March 16	Denver	United States	Mission Ballroom	Isabel LaRosa
March 17	Salt Lake City	United States	The Great Saltair	Isabel LaRosa
March 19	San Francisco	United States	Masonic Auditorium	Isabel LaRosa
March 21	Los Angeles	United States	The Fonda Theatre	Isabel LaRosa
March 22	Los Angeles	United States	The Fonda Theatre	Isabel LaRosa
March 25	Los Angeles	United States	Hollywood Palladium	Isabel LaRosa

European leg
Date (2023)	City	Country	Venue	Opening act
May 16	London	United Kingdom	Heaven	Briskin
May 17	London	United Kingdom	Heaven	Briskin
May 18	Hamburg	Germany	Gruenspan	Briskin
May 22	Amsterdam	Netherlands	Melkweg	Briskin
May 23	Paris	France	Le Trabendo	Briskin

== Set list ==
Barrett performing at the Palace Theater in 2023

Nessa Barrett curated the setlist with the help of music director Asaf Rodeh. Barrett wanted to tell a story with the setlist and did so by transitioning songs together. Barrett said her favorite songs to perform are "Gaslight", "Lovebomb", and "Bang Bang!".

This set list is from the February 23, 2023 concert in Phoenix, Arizona. It is not representative of all dates.

1. "Madhouse"
2. "Talk to Myself"
3. "Decay"
4. "Too Hot to Cry"
5. "God's Favorite"
6. "Scare Myself"
7. "Dear God"
8. "Tired of California"
9. "Deathmatch"
10. "American Jesus"
11. "Lovebomb"
12. "Lucky Star"
13. "Do You Really Want to Hurt Me" (Club Culture cover)
14. "Gaslight"
15. "Die First"
16. "Bang Bang!"
  Encore
17. "Unnecessary Violence"
18. "I Hope Ur Miserable Until Ur Dead"

=== Alterations ===
- Starting at the first date in New York, "Unnecessary Violence" was removed from the setlist.
- Starting with the show in London, "Dying on the Inside" and "Noose" were added to the setlist and "Decay" was removed.
- Starting with the second show in London, "Deathmatch" was replaced with "505", an Arctic Monkeys cover.
