= Baby Doll (disambiguation) =

Baby Doll is a 1956 black comedy film directed by Elia Kazan.

Baby Doll(s) or Babydoll may also refer to:

== Fashion ==
- Babydoll, a style of dress originating from lingerie
- Baby Doll, an Yves Saint Laurent perfume that won a 2000 FiFi Award
- Babydoll, a trend in modelling inspired by supermodel Gemma Ward

== People ==
- Bebi Dol or Baby Doll (born 1962), Serbian and Yugoslav singer and songwriter
- Baby Doll (wrestler) (born 1962), ring name of professional wrestler Nickla Roberts
- Baby Doll, stage name of Indian model / performer Deepal Shaw
- Baby Doll, another name for Pussycat Doll Melody Thornton (born 1984)
- Malaysia Babydoll Foxx, American drag queen

== Film and television ==
- Baby Doll (1916 film)
- La bambolona or Baby Doll, a 1967 Italian comedy film
- "Baby Doll", a 1987 episode of the American comedy series Charles in Charge
- "Baby-Doll" (Batman: The Animated Series), a 1994 television episode
  - Baby-Doll (character), introduced in the episode
- "Baby Doll", a 2002 science fiction short story by Johanna Sinisalo
- Babydoll, the protagonist of the 2011 film Sucker Punch

== Music ==
- Babydoll (album), by Alisha Chinai
- Baby Dolls, a Filipino girl group
- "Baby Doll" (Girlicious song), 2008
- "Baby Doll" (Top Cats song), 2012
- "Baby Doll" (Kanika Kapoor song), 2014
- "Baby Doll" (Pat Green song), 2004
- "Babydoll" (Ari Abdul song), 2022
- "Babydoll" (Dominic Fike song), 2018
- "Babydoll" (Jamie Miller song), 2026
- "Baby Doll", a song from the 1952 film The Belle of New York
- "Baby Doll", a song by Cat Power from her 2003 album You Are Free
- "Baby Doll", a song by Devo from their 1988 album Total Devo
- "Babydoll", a song by The Fratellis from their 2008 album Here We Stand
- "Babydoll", a song by Hole from their 1991 album Pretty on the Inside
- "Babydoll", a song by Laurie Anderson from her 1989 album Strange Angels
- "Babydoll", a song by Mariah Carey from her 1997 album Butterfly
- "Baby Doll", a song by N.E.R.D. from their 2001 album In Search of...
- "Babydoll", a song by Nessa Barrett from her 2024 album Aftercare
- "Baby Doll", a song by Penny McLean from her 1975 album Lady Bump
- "Baby Doll", a song by Tony! Toni! Toné! from their 1988 album Who?
- "Oh Baby Doll", a 1957 song by Chuck Berry included on his 1958 album One Dozen Berrys

== Other uses ==
- Babydoll, a diminutive variety of the Southdown breed of sheep
