= Jesus Loves a Primadonna =

EP by Nessa Barrett
- Released: March 20, 2026
- Recorded: April 2025–2026
- Genre: Alternative pop
- Length: 27:34
- Label: Warner
- Producers: Arthur Besna; CJ Baran

Nessa Barrett chronology
Aftercare (2024)	Jesus Loves a Primadonna (2026)	Tough Love (2026)

Singles from Jesus Loves a Primadonna
- 1. "High on Heaven" Released: January 16, 2026; 2. "Stay with Me" Released: February 27, 2026; 3. "Buffalo 66" Released: March 20, 2026

Jesus Loves a Primadonna (stylized in sentence case) is the third extended play (EP) by American singer-songwriter Nessa Barrett. It was released on March 20, 2026 by Warner Records. The EP was inspired by the works of Portishead, Massive Attack, Mother Mother, and Pink Floyd. The songs include aspects of desert rock, trip-hop, and grunge. Speaking about the EP's themes, Barrett stated: "Jesus Loves a Primadonna is all about love. It's beauty and demise. The villain origin story of every woman who has loved until she can not love anymore."

== Critical reception ==
Jesus Loves a Primadonna opened to generally favorable reviews, with Jim Barber of Music Life Magazine characterizing the EP as "an immersive dive into toxic romance & staggering vulnerability". Writing for Euphoria magazine, Nmesoma Okechukwu noted that the listener should "prepare to get moody, unsure, happy, elevated, and insecure all at once". She also emphasized Barrett's writing skills and ear for a strong chorus. Danielle Holian for When the Horn Blows describes the EP as "both intimate and cinematic", writing that Jesus loves a primadonna is "a testament to Barrett's evolution from bedroom pop starlet to an artist of considerable emotional and sonic maturity". Holian highlights Barrett's ability to use a variety of emotional registers without losing cohesion and the consistent "tension" throughout the EP.

== Songs ==
Barrett released the lead single for the EP, "High on Heaven" on January 16, 2026. The song was originally planned to be titled "High On Heroin". Barrett's label Warner Records made her change the song title to be more appropriate. The song was first revealed in September 2025 on Barrett's TikTok account.

Both "Buffalo 66" and "Stay with Me" received music videos upon their release. The music video for Stay With Me was directed by Kristen Jan Wong and Nessa Barrett and was released on February 27, 2026. The video for Buffalo 66 features the lead singer to alternative rock band The Neighbourhood, Jesse Rutherford and was released along with the EP on March 20, 2026. The song was inspired by the film Buffalo '66. In a statement about the song, Barrett said: "This song ['Buffalo 66'] was inspired by the Stockholm syndrome in the film ... 'Buffalo 66' reflects on the emotional heartache of being naïve in a toxic relationship".

In an interview with Zach Sang for the Zach Sang Show, Barrett revealed that "Glamorous" from her third studio album Tough Love was originally intended for Jesus Loves a Primadonna, but was ultimately cut from its final track listing.

== Tour ==
Barrett announced the "Jesus Loves a Primadonna: An Evening with Nessa Barrett" on March 2, 2026, which included five dates across the United States and Canada. The shows began on April 3, 2026 in Los Angeles and concluded on April 11, 2026 in Toronto. During an interview with iHeartRadio Canada, Barrett described how she wanted the shows to feel more "intimate".

On May 14, 2026, Barrett was announced to be playing at the Calgary Stampede on the Coca-Cola stage along with headliner All Time Low on July 4, 2026.

=== Tour dates ===
Date	City	Country	Venue
April 3, 2026	Los Angeles	United States	The Masonic Lodge at Hollywood Forever
April 4, 2026	Los Angeles	United States	The Masonic Lodge at Hollywood Forever
April 7, 2026	Chicago	United States	Thalia Hall
April 9, 2026	Brooklyn	United States	St. Ann & the Holy Trinity Church
April 11, 2026	Toronto	Canada	Elgin and Winter Garden Theatres

=== Cancelled shows ===
Date	City	Country	Venue	Reason
July 4, 2026	Calgary	Canada	Coca-Cola Stage	Scheduling conflicts

== Track listing ==
Jesus Loves a Primadonna track listing
No.	Title	Writer(s)	Producer(s)	Length
1.	"West Coast Prayer"	Nessa Barrett; CJ Baran; Arthur Besna	Baran; Besna	3:30
2.	"'Til Death Do Us Part"	Barrett; Baran; Besna; Kayleigh O' Connor	Baran; Besna	3:10
3.	"Black Haired Madonna"	Barrett; Baran; Besna; Cara Salimando	Baran; Besna	3:32
4.	"Venom"	Barrett; Baran; Besna; Kristin Carpenter	Baran; Besna	3:03
5.	"Buffalo 66"	Barrett; Baran; Besna; Jessica Agombar	Baran; Besna	4:27
6.	"High on Heaven"	Barrett; Baran; Besna; Madison Yanofsky; Sean Kennedy	Baran; Besna	3:19
7.	"Special to You"	Barrett; Baran; Besna; Carpenter; Kennedy	Baran; Besna	2:41
8.	"Stay with Me"	Barrett; Baran; Besna	Baran; Besna	3:47
Total length:				27:34

== Charts ==
Chart performance for Jesus Loves a Primadonna
Chart (2026)	Peak position
Australian Albums (ARIA)	41
Scottish Albums (OCC)	67

== Release history ==
List of release dates and formats
Region	Date	Format(s)	Label	Ref.
Various	March 20, 2026	Digital download; streaming	Warner Records	
Various	April 24, 2026	Vinyl record; CD	Warner Records	
