= Aftercare World Tour =

2025 concert tour by Nessa Barret

- Tour by Nessa Barrett
- Promotional poster
- Location: North America; South America; Europe; Oceania; Asia
- Associated album: Aftercare
- Start date: February 7, 2025
- End date: December 16, 2025
- Legs: 3
- No. of shows: 56
- Supporting acts: Sombr; Ari Abdul; Thomas Day
- Website: nessa-barrett.com

Nessa Barrett concert chronology
- Church Club for the Lonely Tour (2023); Aftercare World Tour (2025); Jesus Loves a Primadonna: An Intimate Evening with Nessa Barrett (2026)

The Aftercare World Tour was the third headlining concert tour by singer-songwriter Nessa Barrett. The tour was announced on November 19, 2024 in support of her sophomore album Aftercare. It began on February 4, 2025 at the Fillmore in Minneapolis, Minnesota and ended on December 16, 2025 at the Fortitude Music Hall in Brisbane, Australia.

The tour consisted of dates across the United States, Canada, Ireland, England, Scotland, Denmark, Belgium, the Netherlands, Germany, Czechia, France, Japan, and Australia. Barrett also performed at Lollapalooza in South America. Sombr and Ari Abdul served as supporting acts for the North American and European legs respectively. She was joined by Thomas Day for the Australian leg of the tour.

== Critical reception ==
Critic reviews were generally positive, with Allison S. Park of The Harvard Crimson praising Barrett's sense of humanity as a performer, mentioning that her "music and artistry extend beyond the stage, offering a sense of healing and connection." Park wrote that it was a "very simple" setlist, noting how the environment let Barrett "shine". She added that the show was stopped several times due to "crowd disruptions", adding that Barrett's choreography was "simple" but kept audiences engaged. Sarah Peter for Melodic Magazine praised Barrett's vocals and visual performance, describing the tour as "captivating" and "electrifying". Peter further praised the concert's opening act Ari Abdul, writing that Abdul left fans "energized and ready" for Barrett's headlining performance. Allston Pudding's Vika Brennick wrote that Barrett had "truly connected with everyone in the crowd", mentioning how the tour felt "intimate" for being "such a large venue". Brennick complimented the tours visuals and choreography, calling them "stunning" and "sharp" respectively.

== Tour dates ==
First leg
Date (2025)	City	Country	Venue	Supporting Act
February 4	Minneapolis	United States	The Fillmore	Ari Abdul
February 6	Chicago	United States	The Salt Shed	Ari Abdul
February 7	Cincinnati	United States	Bogarts	Ari Abdul
February 8	Detroit	United States	The Fillmore Detroit	Ari Abdul
February 11	Philadelphia	United States	Philadelphia Opera House	Ari Abdul
February 13	Toronto	Canada	History	Ari Abdul
February 14	Montreal	Canada	Beanfield Theatre	Ari Abdul
February 17	Brooklyn	United States	Brooklyn Paramount	Ari Abdul
February 18	Brooklyn	United States	Brooklyn Paramount	Ari Abdul
February 20	Boston	United States	Roadrunner	Ari Abdul
February 21	Silver Spring	United States	The Fillmore Silver Spring	Ari Abdul
February 23	Atlanta	United States	Tabernacle	Ari Abdul
February 24	Orlando	United States	House of Blues	Ari Abdul
February 26	Nashville	United States	Marathon Music Works	Ari Abdul
February 28	Dallas	United States	House of Blues	Ari Abdul
March 1	Houston	United States	House of Blues	Ari Abdul
March 4	Salt Lake City	United States	The Complex	Ari Abdul
March 6	Seattle	United States	The Showbox	Ari Abdul
March 8	Austin	United States	Sips & Sounds Festival	—N/a
March 10	Sacramento	United States	Ace of Spaces	Ari Abdul
March 11	Oakland	United States	Fox Oakland Theater	Ari Abdul
March 13	Phoenix	United States	The Van Buren	Ari Abdul
March 15	Los Angeles	United States	The Wiltern	Ari Abdul
March 16	Los Angeles	United States	The Wiltern	Ari Abdul
March 21	Beunos Aires	Argentina	Lollapalooza	—N/a
March 22	Santiago	Chile	Lollapalooza	—N/a
March 28	São Paulo	Brazil	Lollapalooza	—N/a
March 30	Bogotá	Colombia	Festival Estéreo Picnic	—N/a

Second leg
Date (2025)	City	Country	Venue	Supporting Act
May 26	Dublin	Ireland	3Olympia Theatre	Sombr
May 27	Dublin	Ireland	3Olympia Theatre	Sombr
May 29	Glasglow	Scotland	Barrowland Ballroom	Sombr
May 30	Glasglow	Scotland	O2 Academy Glasgow	Sombr
May 31	Manchester	England	Manchester Academy	Sombr
June 3	London	England	O2 Forum Kentish Town	Sombr
June 4	London	England	O2 Forum Kentish Town	Sombr
June 7	Copenhagen	Denmark	Vega	Sombr
June 9	Brussels	Belgium	Belgique	Sombr
June 11	Utrecht	Netherlands	TivoliVredenburg	Sombr
June 13	Cologne	Germany	Carlswerk Victoria	Sombr
June 14	Cologne	Germany	Carlswerk Victoria	Sombr
June 15	Munich	Germany	Theaterfabrik	Sombr
June 17	Prague	Czechia	Roxy	Sombr
June 18	Berlin	Germany	Huxleys Neue Welt	Sombr
June 19	Hamburg	Germany	Große Freiheit 36	Sombr
June 22	Paris	France	Bataclan	Sombr
June 23	Paris	France	Bataclan	Sombr
August 9	Aspen	Colorado	Up In The Sky Festival	—N/a
August 16	Osaka	Japan	Summer Sonic Festival	—N/a
August 17	Tokyo	Japan	Summer Sonic Festival	—N/a

Third leg
Date (2025)	City	Country	Venue	Supporting Act
December 6	Ballarat	Australia	Spilt Milk Festival	—N/a
December 7	Perth	Australia	Spilt Milk Festival	—N/a
December 9	Melbourne	Australia	Margaret Court Arena	Thomas Day
December 10	Syndey	Australia	Hordern Pavillion	Thomas Day
December 13	Canberra	Australia	Spilt Milk Festival	—N/a
December 14	Gold Coast	Australia	Spilt Milk Festival	—N/a
December 16	Brisbane	Australia	Fortitude Music Hall	Thomas Day

== Set list ==
=== North American leg ===
This set list is from the February 6, 2025 concert in Chicago, Illinois. It is not representative of all dates.

1. "S.L.U.T."
2. "Babydoll"
3. "Heartbeat"
4. "Dirty Little Secret"
5. "Russian Roulette"
6. "Love Looks Pretty on You"
7. "Mustang Baby"
8. "Passenger Princess"
9. "Keep Your Eyes on Me Boy"
10. "Does God Cry?"
11. "Stay Alive"
12. "Given Enough"
13. "Edward Scissorhands"
14. "Heartbreak in the Hamptons"
15. "Disco"
16. "Gaslight"
17. "Glitter and Violence"
18. "Blue Valentine"
19. "Glory Box (Portishead cover)
20. "Pornstar"
  Encore
21. "Scare Myself"
22. "Pins and Needles"
23. "Aftercare"

=== European leg ===
This set list is from the May 26, 2025 concert in Dublin, Ireland. It is not representative of all dates.

1. "Dirty Little Secret"
2. "Disco"
3. "S.L.U.T."
4. "Babydoll"
5. "Heartbreak in the Hamptons"
6. "Heartbeat"
7. "Edward Scissorhands"
8. "Blue Valentine"
9. "Glitter and Violence"
10. "Pins and Needles"
11. "Mustang Baby"
12. "Given Enough"
13. "Love Looks Pretty on You"
14. "Russian Roulette"
15. "Keep Your Eyes on Me Boy"
16. "Gaslight"
17. "Dying on the Inside"
18. "Glory Box" (Portishead cover)
19. "Aftercare"
  Encore
20. "The One That Should've Got Away"
21. "Die First"
22. "Pornstar"

=== Alterations ===
- Starting at the show in Brooklyn, "American Beauty" and "Breakfast in Bed" were added to the setlist.
- Starting at the show in Sacramento, "Die First" and "Dying on the Inside" were added to the setlist and "American Beauty" was removed.
- During the shows in Los Angeles, Tommy Genesis joined Barrett onstage to perform "Disco".
