= Tough Love (Nessa Barrett album) =

Studio album by Nessa Barrett
- Released: September 25, 2026
- Recorded: 2026
- Genre: Pop rock
- Length: 34:09
- Label: Warner
- Producers: CJ Baran; Arthur Besna

Nessa Barrett chronology
Jesus Loves a Primadonna (2026)	Tough Love (2026)

Singles from Tough Love
- 1. "Too Fast to Live, Too Young to Die" Released: July 17, 2026; 2. "Bad Girls Never Die" Released: August 21, 2026; 3. "Tough Love" Released: September 25, 2026

Tough Love is the third studio album by American singer-songwriter Nessa Barrett. It was released on September 25, 2026, by Warner Records. The album was inspired by the works of Lana Del Rey, Portishead, the Eagles, Fleetwood Mac, and Alice in Chains. In support of the album, Barrett is set to embark on her fifth headlining concert tour, the Tough Love Tour. The dates span from March 2, 2027 in Dublin, Ireland to March 25, 2027 in Prague, Czech Republic. She also supported the album with an opening spot on the Neighbourhood's Wourld Tour, from August to December 2026. The album was produced by CJ Baran and Arthur Besna, incorporating elements of trip hop production with dark pop synths.

== Background and development ==
Tough Love was released just six months after her third EP Jesus Loves a Primadonna, which was released on March 20, 2026. Barrett described the album's central thesis by stating:

"Tough Love is about the darkest and toughest parts of love—songs for those who are themselves tough to love, and songs for love that's tough to find."

— Nessa Barrett

The lead single, "Too Fast to Live, Too Young to Die" was released on July 17, 2026. The pop-rock track is a mature love song about "the thrill that comes with falling in love". The song debuted at number 18 on the New Zealand Hot 40 chart on the week dated July 30, 2026.

Tough Love follows Barrett's second studio album Aftercare, which peaked at No. 98 on the Billboard 200 chart in 2025 and had received mixed reviews from critics, but many praised Barrett's writing and vocals. Barrett continues in this direction on her third album, evolving the desire and lust from Aftercare and the themes of Stockholm syndrome and other mental health issues covered on Jesus Loves a Primadonna. In an interview with Zach Sang for the Zach Sang Show in March 2026, Barrett explained how she feels "more connected" to her current music than she does her previous work, and that she wants to create lower energy music. The following month in an interview with Wired for the Autocomplete Interview, Barrett explained how her new music will be "different from the last" as she matures as a person. In this same interview she also revealed her then upcoming third album would be released that year, which was confirmed to be Tough Love releasing in September 2026.

In an interview with Vogue Portugal, Barrett said that the album was about "love in general" and her "love-hate relationship with Hollywood". She described the visual identity of Tough Love as "witchy" and "dark", adding that the darker parts of her life is what inspires her music.

== Writing and recording ==
In an October 2026 interview with Zach Sang for the Zach Sang Show, Barrett revealed that she wrote and recorded every track on Tough Love within five months following the release of her EP Jesus Loves a Primadonna. She added that "Glamorous" was the only exception, which had originally been written for the EP. While discussing the albums title, Barrett said that the name was chosen after she wrote the song “Tough Love”, using it as a title track.

In an interview with Glamour Australia after being asked about a deluxe edition of the album, Barrett said that she is “already [working] on it".

=== Songs ===
Barrett described "Fetish" as her "favorite" song on the album, adding that it contains her favorite lyric from Tough Love. She said that she initially wrote the song as a "jazzy" track before altering it to incorporate a more "rap"-influenced cadence. She described "Coming Home Again" as a "country-western" song, citing Fleetwood Mac and the Eagles as inspiration.

The albums lead single "Too Fast to Live, Too Young to Die" has been described as a "pop rock" track, incorporating strings and guitars produced by CJ Baran and Arthur Besna respectively.

== Critical reception ==
Emma Wilkes for Kerrang! wrote that the album was "cloaked in decadent escapism", praising tracks such as "Glamorous" and "Dracula" for their production and grit. Wilkes criticized the album's reliance on inspirations from other artists such as Lana Del Rey and Arctic Monkeys, but added that the album has a clear "vision". Nmesoma Okechukwu for Euphoria Magazine gave the album 3.5/5 stars, writing that it is one of her "most cohesive, yet experimental records to date". She praised the title track's lyrical content and production. Okechukwu wrote that "Tough Love is an outlet where experiences and fantasies blend together to tell us about the various shades of love", complimenting the album's storytelling and theme. She also praised the album's second single "Bad Girls Never Die", writing that the song has "carved Barrett her own sound outside of mainstream pop music", comparing the track to the likes of Del Rey's single "Summertime Sadness" and her 2012 album Born to Die.

Allyson Franzo for Melodic Magazine commended Barrett's ability to "embrace the less attractive sides of love", a central theme on Tough Love. She complimented the sonic landscape Barrett and her team created, praising tracks such as "Dracula" and "Glamorous", commenting that the latter was "one of the best examples of [the] transition to this dark side of fame and glamour". Franzo added that Tough Love shows how Barrett uses music to transform her romantic and fame-related troubles into theatrical art.

== Touring ==
In support of Tough Love and her 2026 EP Jesus Loves a Primadonna, Barrett was announced as an opening act for the Neighbourhood's seventh concert tour, the Wourld Tour, with dates in Europe and the United States from August 24, 2026 at Stockholm, Sweden's Avicii Arena to December 4, 2026 at the Kia Forum in Inglewood, California. She will be opening alongside LA-native artist Noise Dept.. Her show in Manchester at the Co-op Live arena will be the largest of Barrett's career, with a capacity of 23,500. Barrett has described how the Neighbourhood has been a major influence in her music. The lead singer of the band, Jesse Rutherford, featured in the music video for her track "Buffalo 66", which was released on March 20, 2026.

On September 29, 2026, Barrett announced her fifth headlining concert tour, the Tough Love Tour. The European dates begin on March 2, 2027 in Dublin, Ireland at the National Stadium and are set to conclude on March 25, 2027 in Prague, Czech Republic at the Lucerna Palace.

== Commercial performance ==
Tough Love debuted on the United Kingdom's Official Charts, including number 22 on the Albums Sales Chart and number 15 on the Albums Downloads Chart. The album also debuted at number 22 and 28 on the Vinyl and Physical Albums Chart respectively. Tough Love debuted at number 7 on the Australian Albums Chart, becoming her first top-10 album worldwide. The albums lead single "Too Fast to Live, Too Young to Die" debuted at number 18 on the New Zealand's Hot 40 chart.

In the United States, the album debuted on several Billboard charts, including at number 137 on the Billboard 200, number 14 on the Top Album Sales chart, number six on the Vinyl Albums chart, number five on the Indie Store Album Sales chart, and number 38 on the Top Rock/Alternative Albums chart.

Following the release of the album, Barrett re-entered the Billboard Emerging Artists chart at a new peak of number two. She also re-entered the Billboard Artist 100 chart at number 90.

== Track listing ==
Tough Love track listing
No.	Title	Writer(s)	Producer(s)	Length
1.	"Tough Love"	Nessa Barrett; Arthur Besna; CJ Baran; Sean Kennedy	Arthur Besna; CJ Baran	3:15
2.	"Too Fast to Live, Too Young to Die"	Barrett; Besna; Baran; Cara Salimando	Besna; Baran	3:21
3.	"Dracula"	Barrett; Besna; Baran	Besna; Baran	2:59
4.	"Fetish"	Barrett; Besna; Baran; Salimando	Besna; Baran	2:50
5.	"Only for You"	Barrett; Besna; Baran; Madison Yanosfky	Besna; Baran	3:22
6.	"Glamorous"	Barrett; Besna; Baran	Besna; Baran	3:16
7.	"Coming Home Again"	Barrett; Besna; Baran	Besna; Baran	2:50
8.	"Bunny"	Barrett; Besna; Baran; Salimando	Besna; Baran	3:05
9.	"Candy"	Barrett; Besna; Baran; Yanosfky	Besna; Baran	2:47
10.	"God Gave Me Expensive Taste"	Barrett; Besna; Baran	Besna; Baran	3:34
11.	"Bad Girls Never Die"	Barrett; Besna; Baran	Besna; Baran	2:46
Total length:				34:09

== Personnel ==
Musicians

- Nessa Barrett – lead vocals, guitar (track 9)
- CJ Baran – producer (all tracks), bass (tracks 1–5, 7, 10-11), drums (tracks 1-2, 4-5, 11), guitar (track 6), mellotron (tracks 1-5, 7, 10), string arrangement (tracks 1-5, 10-11), synthesizer (tracks 2, 4-6, 8, 10-11), piano (track 10)
- Arthur Besna – producer (all tracks), drums (tracks 1-5, 11), guitar (tracks 1-8, 9-11), mellotron (tracks 1, 7), string arrangement (tracks 1-5, 10-11), synthesizer (tracks 2, 4-6, 8, 10-11), piano (track 10)
- Sean Kennedy – guitar (track 1)
- Paul J Cartwright – cello ,(tracks 1-2, 5, 10-11), violin (tracks 2, 4-5, 10-11), viola (tracks 2, 4, 10-11)
- Max Nudi - drums (track 7)

Technical

- CJ Baran – engineer, recording (all tracks)
- Arthur Besna – engineer, recording (all tracks)
- Nick Trapani – engineer (all tracks)
- Nathan Danzler – mastering (all tracks)
- Harrison Tate – assistant mastering engineer (all tracks)
- Victor Verpillat – mixing (all tracks)

== Charts ==
Chart performance for Tough Love
Chart (2026)	Peak position
Australian Albums (ARIA)	7
Belgian Albums (Ultratop Flanders)	104
Belgian Albums (Ultratop Wallonia)	62
Dutch Albums (Album Top 100)	73
German Albums (Offizielle Top 100)	60
New Zealand Albums (RMNZ)	37
Portuguese Albums (AFP)	111
Scottish Albums (Official Charts)	18
UK Albums Sales (OCC)	22
US Billboard 200	137
US Billboard Top Rock & Alternative Albums	38

== Release history ==
List of release dates and formats
Region	Date	Format(s)	Label	Ref.
Various	September 25, 2026	CD; digital download; streaming; vinyl	Warner Records	
