= Let the World Burn =

Let the World Burn may refer to:

- Let the World Burn (EP), by Vio-lence, 2022
- "Let the World Burn" (song), by Chris Grey, 2024
