= Evan Blair =

Canadian songwriter and record producer

- Born: Evan Robert Elliot Blair; Toronto, Ontario, Canada
- Occupations: Songwriter, record producer
- Years active: 2013–present

Evan Robert Elliot Blair is a Canadian songwriter and record producer based in Los Angeles, United States. He has co-written and produced songs for artists including Nessa Barrett, Dove Cameron, Benson Boone, Rosé, and Aespa. Blair was included in Billboard's 2024 list of rising producers charting on the Billboard Hot 100 and received the SOCAN Songwriter of the Year (Non-Performer) award in 2025.

== Early life ==
Blair was born and raised in Toronto, Ontario, Canada. As a teenager, he played guitar and drums in various indie and rock bands. He later performed and released music under the stage name Charlie Darker in the electronic dance music (EDM) scene during the early 2010s.

== Career ==
Blair toured as a DJ for several years in the early 2010s. In 2014, he signed a publishing deal with Selector Songs.

In 2021, he served as executive producer and a primary co-writer on Nessa Barrett's debut EP Pretty Poison. He also co-wrote and produced her single "i hope ur miserable until ur dead", which marked her first entry on the Billboard Hot 100. He executive-produced her debut album Young Forever (2022).

In 2022, Blair co-wrote and produced Dove Cameron's single "Boyfriend", which peaked at number 16 on the Billboard Hot 100. He contributed to additional tracks on her projects, including "Breakfast", "Bad Idea", and "Girl Like Me".

Blair has collaborated extensively with Benson Boone. He co-wrote and produced Boone's 2024 single "Beautiful Things" (with Boone and Jack LaFrantz), which reached number 2 on the Billboard Hot 100, topped charts in multiple countries, and accumulated over two billion streams on Spotify. The song originated in their first writing session. Blair continued working with Boone on tracks from the albums Fireworks & Rollerblades and American Heart, including "Pretty Slowly", "Mystical Magical", "Mr. Electric Blue", "Young American Heart", "Take Me Home", and "Reminds Me of You".

Additional credits include co-writing and producing Rosé's "toxic till the end" from her debut solo album rosie, Aespa's "Dirty Work" from their single album Dirty Work, and multiple tracks on CIL's album don't hold me accountable (such as "hot shit", "rhythm of love", "forgot to be my lover", and "pretty years"). He has also worked with artists including Jazmin Bean, Maren Morris, Reneé Rapp, and Dasha.

Blair maintains a home studio in Encino, Los Angeles, and prefers analog equipment, including a Fender Telecaster guitar and a Prophet-6 synthesizer. He is signed to Sony Music Publishing.

== Awards and recognition ==
- 2024 – Included in Billboard's list of rising producers on the Hot 100.
- 2025 – SOCAN Songwriter of the Year (Non-Performer) and SOCAN No. 1 Song Award for "Beautiful Things".

== Selected discography ==
=== As co-writer and/or producer ===
- Nessa Barrett – Pretty Poison (2021; executive producer); "i hope ur miserable until ur dead" (2021); Young Forever (2022; executive producer)
- Dove Cameron – "Boyfriend" (2022); "Breakfast" (2022); "Bad Idea" (2022); "Girl Like Me" (2022); "Do the Math" (2026)
- Benson Boone – "Beautiful Things" (2024); "Pretty Slowly" (2024); tracks from Fireworks & Rollerblades and American Heart including "Mystical Magical", "Mr. Electric Blue", "Young American Heart", "Take Me Home", and "Reminds Me of You"
- Rosé – "toxic till the end" (2024)
- Aespa – "Dirty Work" (2025)
- CIL – tracks from don't hold me accountable including "hot shit", "rhythm of love", "forgot to be my lover", "pretty years"
- Jazmin Bean – "Best Junkie You Adore" from Traumatic Livelihood (2024)
