= Fallen Angel (Ari Abdul EP) =

EP by Ari Abdul
- Released: October 7, 2022
- Genre: Alternative pop
- Length: 17:06
- Label: Slumbo Labs/RCA
- Producers: Thomas LaRosa; Russel Chell; Lucas Sim

Ari Abdul chronology
| Fallen Angel (2022) | CCTV (2023) |

Singles from Fallen Angel
- 1. "Babydoll" Released: February 22, 2022; 2. "Stay" Released: April 29, 2022; 3. "Taste" Released: June 21, 2022

Fallen Angel is the debut extended play released by American singer-songwriter Ari Abdul on October 7, 2022, through RCA Records/Slumbo Labs.

== Critical reception ==
Zangba Thomson of Bong Mines Entertainment describes the EP as "dark and gloomy pop-noir work".

Justin Angle of the Daily Beat highlights how the EP uniquely blends in alternative pop and dark pop.

== Track list ==
Fallen Angel track listing
| No. | Title | Writer(s) | Producer(s) | Length |
|---|---|---|---|---|
| 1. | "Babydoll" | Ari Abdul; Isabel LaRosa; Thomas LaRosa | Thomas LaRosa | 3:16 |
| 2. | "Taste" | Ari Abdul; Isabel LaRosa; Thomas LaRosa | Thomas LaRosa | 3:06 |
| 3. | "Hush" | Ari Abdul; Thomas LaRosa; Justin Tranter; Skyler Stonestreet; Russel Chell | Thomas LaRosa; Russel Chell | 3:10 |
| 4. | "Stay" | Ari Abdul; Isabel LaRosa; Thomas LaRosa | Thomas LaRosa | 2:52 |
| 5. | "Cursed" | Ari Abdul; Thomas LaRosa | Thomas LaRosa | 2:22 |
| 6. | "Hellgirl" | Ari Abdul; Thomas LaRosa | Thomas LaRosa; Lucas Sim | 2:16 |
| Total length: | | | | 17:06 |
