= The Void (album) =

Studio album by Ari Abdul
- Released: November 13, 2026
- Length: 34:07
- Label: RCA
- Producers: Ella Boh; Stint; Digi

Ari Abdul chronology
CCTV (2023)	The Void (2026)

Singles from The Void
- 1. "Enamored" Released: June 12, 2026; 2. "Seductive" Released: August 21, 2026; 3. "FMTYLM" Released: September 25, 2026; 4. "Nobody's Hero" Released: October 30, 2026

The Void (styled in all caps) is the debut studio album by American singer-songwriter Ari Abdul. It was released on November 13, 2026, through RCA Records.

== Background ==
The Void is heavily inspired by the loneliness and the yearning for connection that's felt in films like Requiem for a Dream, Taxi Driver, and Fallen Angels.

— Ari Abdul,

After finishing her headlining tour, the Change Tour, on March 31, 2026, Abdul released various singles. In June, Abdul released "Enamored", a song about being lovesick after Abdul's partner was away on tour. In August, she released "Seductive", a dark sultry track about wanting to do anything to be accepted. In September, she released a third single, "FMTYLM", a song which Abdul described as "self-objectification, insecurity, and the desperate pursuit of external validation. Her debut album, titled The Void, was announced the same day. In October, she released a fourth single, "Nobody's Hero", a song which she described as recognising one's self-destructive behavior in others.

== Track listing ==
No.	Title	Writer(s)	Producer(s)	Length
1.	"Don't Know Me"	Ajay Bhattacharyya; Ari Abdul; Ella Boh	Stint; Ella Boh	2:18
2.	"Home"	Bhattacharyya; Abdul; Boh; Emma Rosen; Jamil Chammas; Willie Cobbs; Ellas McDaniel	Boh; Digi; Stint	2:53
3.	"Seductive"	Bhattacharyya; Abdul; Boh; Ilsey Juber	Boh; Stint	3:04
4.	"Enamored"	Bhattacharyya; Abdul; Trey Campbell; Boh; Salem Ilese	Stint	2:48
5.	"Touch Me"	Bhattacharyya; Abdul; Boh	Boh; Stint	2:55
6.	"The Void"	Bhattacharyya; Abdul; Boh	Boh; Stint
7.	"Nobody's Hero"	Abdul; Bhattacharyya; Rachel West	Stint; Boh	3:19
8.	"Dopesick"	Bhattacharyya; Abdul; Boh	Boh; Stint	2:22
9.	"FMTYLM"	Abdul; Bhattacharyya; Boh; Rosen; Chammas	Boh; Stint; Digi	3:01
10.	"Change"	Bhattacharyya; Abdul; Boh	Boh; Stint	3:13
11.	"Sorry"	Bhattacharyya; Abdul; Boh	Boh; Stint	1:55
12.	"Heaven"	Bhattacharyya; Abdul; Boh	Boh; Stint	3:25
Total length:				34:07
