= CCTV (EP) =

EP by Ari Abdul
- Released: October 13, 2023
- Genre: Alternative pop
- Length: 15:55
- Label: Slumbo Labs/RCA

Ari Abdul chronology
Fallen Angel (2022)	CCTV (2023)	The Void (2026)

Singles from CCTV
- 1. "Bury You" Released: September 15, 2023

CCTV is the second extended play released by American singer-songwriter Ari Abdul on October 13, 2023, through RCA Records/Slumbo Labs.

== Critical reception ==
Harriett Dolphin of Oculate UK described the EP as "a haunting blend of reverb-heavy swells and vibrant storytelling".

Robin Murray of Clash described the lyrics as replete with nods to horrorism.

Zero Nine Magazine described the EP as Abdul's "villain arc".

== Track listing ==
CCTV track listing
No.	Title	Writer(s)	Producer(s)	Length
1.	"You Belong to Me"	Ari Abdul; Thomas LaRosa; Lucas Sim	Thomas LaRosa; Lucas Sim	2:48
2.	"Who Were You With Last Night"	Abdul; Russel Chell; Lauren Frawley	Russ Chell	2:42
3.	"Bury You"	Abdul; Mikky Ekko; Wyatt Bernard	Wyatt Bernard	2:14
4.	"Bite Marks"	Abdul; LaRosa; Sim; Benjamin Katz; Oliver Cazier	LaRosa; Sim; Benny Bellson; Stacy Sinclair	2:41
5.	"Last Breath"	Abdul; Gregory Aldae Hein; Daniel Omelio; Lee Stashenko	Robopop	3:01
6.	"Slow Dancing"	Abdul; David Wilson; Ella Boh	Dwilly	2:25
Total length:				15:55
