= Aftercare (album) =

Studio album by Nessa Barrett
- Released: November 15, 2024
- Recorded: 2024
- Genres: Alternative pop; dark pop; electro-pop
- Length: 44:56
- Label: Warner
- Producers: Artemas; CJ Baran; Arthur Besna; Evan Blair; Aaron Shadrow; Kevin White

Nessa Barrett chronology
Hell Is a Teenage Girl (2023)	Aftercare (2024)	Jesus Loves a Primadonna (2026)

Singles from Aftercare
- 1. "Passenger Princess" Released: July 26, 2024; 2. "Dirty Little Secret" Released: September 20, 2024; 3. "Disco" Released: October 18, 2024; 4. "Mustang Baby" Released: November 15, 2024; 5. "Pornstar" Released: January 10, 2025

Singles from Aftercare (Deluxe edition)
- 1. "Does God Cry?" Released: January 24, 2025; 2. "Love Looks Pretty on You" Released: January 31, 2025

Aftercare (stylized in all uppercase) is the second studio album from American singer-songwriter Nessa Barrett. The album was released on November 15, 2024, by Warner Records. A deluxe edition featuring 6 bonus tracks was released on February 7, 2025. Barrett stated that Aftercare was inspired by exploring "love, sex and the aftermath" and was intended to empower listeners to feel "confident and comfortable with themselves and sex." Her main inspirations for the album include Tommy Genesis and Artemas who both feature the album, along with Lana Del Rey, Billie Eilish, Charli XCX, Melanie Martinez, and The Neighbourhood. Musically, Aftercare incorporates aspects of electro-pop, alt-pop, and dark-pop.

The album was released to mixed critical reception, with many publications praising Barrett's vocals, writing, and production. Songs like Dirty Little Secret, Glitter and Violence, and lead single Passenger Princess were especially praised for their production and grit. Barrett supported the album with the Aftercare World Tour, which began on February 4, 2025 in Minneapolis and concluded on December 16, 2025 in Brisbane. On August 15, 2025, Barrett released her first live album, Aftercare Tour (Live in Los Angeles), which includes eight live renditions of songs performed at her Los Angeles show at The Wiltern.

== Background ==
Aftercare is Barrett's fourth release as a recording artist, and her second full length studio album. The project follows Barrett's 2023 EP Hell Is a Teenage Girl and the two stand-alone singles "Club Heaven" and "Girl In New York" released at the end of 2023. Barrett revealed she wanted to title her sophomore album "Church Club For The Lonely", but struggled to create a full body of work with the themes that title presented. She would then pivot into the more dark-pop, sexual direction seen on "Aftercare".

The albums title, Aftercare was chosen because Barrett wanted to have songs about intimacy and sad songs on one record. Aftercare is "the physical and/or emotional care that happens after sexual activity."

In an interview with Zach Sang for the Zach Sang Show, Barrett revealed she began production on the album around March–April 2024 after the creation of "Mustang Baby". After the songs conception, she continued in that direction with "Pins and Needles" and "Given Enough" being created shortly after.

== Impact ==
Prior to its release, 'Love Looks Pretty on You' became a fan favorite after Barrett teased the song for over a year, generating more than 80,000 TikTok videos before its official release. The tracks "Pornstar" and "Pins and Needles" also received major attention on TikTok. The popularity of "Pornstar" online caused Barrett to release the track as a single to radio on January 10, 2025.

== Touring ==
Barrett announced the Aftercare World Tour in November 2024 with support acts from Sombr and Ari Abdul, starting in the United States and finishing in France. In May 2025, additional dates in Australia were added to the tour with support from Thomas Day.

Barrett completed 56 shows across North America, South America, Europe, Australia, and Japan throughout 2025.

== Track listing ==
Aftercare track listing
No.	Title	Writer(s)	Producer(s)	Length
1.	"Aftercare"	Nessa Barrett; Arthur Besnainou; CJ Baran	Arthur Besna; Baran	1:33
2.	"Pornstar"	Barrett; Besnainou; Baran; Jackson Morgan; Madi Yanofsky	Besna; Baran	2:29
3.	"Heartbeat"	Barrett; Besnainou; Baran; Morgan; Yanosfky	Besna; Baran	3:09
4.	"Disco" (featuring Tommy Genesis)	Barrett; Besnainou; Baran; Tommy Genesis; Yanofsky	Besna; Baran	3:17
5.	"Passenger Princess"	Barrett; Jesse Fink; Aaron Shadrow; Kevin White; Yanosfky	Shadrow; White	2:35
6.	"Mustang Baby" (featuring Artemas)	Barrett; Evan Blair; Artemas Diamandis; Morgan	Artemas; Blair	3:11
7.	"Russian Roulette"	Barrett; Blair; Sarah Solovay; Yanosfky	Besna; Baran	2:31
8.	"S.L.U.T."	Barrett; White; Yanosfky	White	2:28
9.	"Babydoll"	Barrett; Baran; Besnainou	Besna; Baran	3:39
10.	"Given Enough"	Barrett; Baran; Besnainou; Pixy Lua; Yanosfky	Besna; Baran	3:24
11.	"Edward Scissorhands"	Barrett; Baran; Yanofsky	Baran	3:31
12.	"Glitter and Violence"	Barrett; Baran; Besnainou; Elizabeth Boland; Yanosfky	Besna; Baran	3:04
13.	"Pins and Needles"	Barrett; Baran; Besnainou; JT Foley; Yanosfky	Besna; Baran	3:21
14.	"Stay Alive"	Barrett; Baran; Besnainou; Boland; Yanosfky	Besna; Baran	3:10
15.	"Dirty Little Secret"	Barrett; Baran; Besnainou; Yanosfky	Besna; Baran	3:34
Total length:				44:56

Aftercare deluxe edition bonus tracks
No.	Title	Writer(s)	Producer(s)	Length
16.	"Love Looks Pretty on You"	Barrett; Blair; Skyler Stonestreet; Kristin Carpenter	Blair	3:12
17.	"Does God Cry?"	Barrett; Hoskins; Morgan	Hoskins	3:38
18.	"Blue Valentine"	Barrett; Hoskins; Yanofsky; Morgan	Hoskins	2:30
19.	"Keep Your Eyes on Me Boy"	Barrett; Baran; Morgan; Brian Fennell	Baran	3:04
20.	"American Beauty"	Barrett; Feli Ferraro; Jason Evigan; Yanofsky; Mark Schick	Evigan; Schick	3:16
21.	"Breakfast in Bed"	Barrett; Baran; Besnainou; Yanosfky	Besna; Baran	3:08
Total length:				63:44

Notes

- All tracks are stylized in all uppercase.
- "S.L.U.T" is an abbreviation of "Sex, Lies, Ugly Truth".
- "Pornstar" became stylized as "P*rnstar" upon its release as a single.

== Personnel ==
Musicians

- Nessa Barrett – lead vocals
- CJ Baran – all instruments, programming (tracks 1–4, 7, 9–15)
- Arthur Besna – all instruments, programming (tracks 1–4, 7, 9, 10, 12–15)
- Kevin White – all instruments, programming (tracks 5, 8)
- Madi Yanofsky – background vocals (track 5)
- Aaron Shadrow – all instruments (track 5)
- Artemas – programming (track 6)
- Evan Blair – programming (track 6)

Technical

- Dale Becker – mastering
- Victor Verpillat – mixing (tracks 1–4, 7–10, 12–14)
- Kevin White – mixing (track 5), engineering (5, 8)
- Alex Ghenea – mixing (track 6)
- Daniel Anglister – mixing (track 11, 17–19, 21)
- Teezio – mixing (track 15)
- CJ Baran – engineering (tracks 1–4, 7, 9–15)
- Arthur Besna – engineering (tracks 1–4, 7, 9, 10, 12–15)
- Artemas – engineering (track 6)
- Evan Blair – engineering (track 6)
- Nick Trapani — engineering assistance (track 19)
- Brandon Hernandez – mastering assistance
- Katie Harvey – mastering assistance
- Nate Mingo – mastering assistance (tracks 1–4, 6–14)

== Charts ==
Chart performance for Aftercare
Chart (2024–2025)	Peak position
Australian Albums (ARIA)	67
Belgian Albums (Ultratop Flanders)	124
Irish Albums (IRMA)	91
Lithuanian Albums (AGATA)	99
Portuguese Albums (AFP)	170
Scottish Albums (Official Charts)	16
UK Albums Sales (OCC)	25
US Billboard 200	98
