= I Like the Way You Kiss Me =

2024 single by Artemas

Single by Artemas

from the album Yustyna
- Released: 19 March 2024
- Recorded: February 2024
- Genre: Alternative pop; dark wave
- Length: 2:22
- Label: Self-released
- Songwriters: Artemas Diamandis; Jesse Fink; Kevin White; Daintree
- Producers: Artemas; White; Daintree

Artemas singles chronology
"Ur Special to Me" (2024)	"I Like the Way You Kiss Me" (2024)	"Dirty Little Secret" (2024)

Music video
- "I Like the Way You Kiss Me" on YouTube

"I Like the Way You Kiss Me" is a song by English singer-songwriter Artemas. It was released independently on 19 March 2024, as the first single from his sophomore mixtape Yustyna (2024).

"I Like the Way You Kiss Me" peaked at number three on the UK Singles Chart. The song topped the charts in Austria, Belgium (Flanders), Germany, Latvia, Lithuania, Poland, Sweden, and Switzerland, peaked within the top ten of the charts in various countries including Australia, Canada, France, Ireland, New Zealand, and Norway, and the top 20 in Italy and the United States.

== Background ==
Following the release of his debut mixtape Pretty in February 2024 and having hosted two shows at The Lower Third in London, Artemas returned to the recording studio and created "I Like the Way You Kiss Me". Artemas announced the single on 15 March on his social media.

== Composition ==
Musically, "I Like the Way You Kiss Me" is a darkwave and alternative pop song, fueled by "moody 80s and pulsating synths" featuring a "dark, retro-futuristic sound collage". The song is 2 minutes and 23 seconds in common time and runs at a tempo of 152 beats per minute.

Artemas' "crooning, gloomy" vocals on the chorus serve as a counterpart to the "kinetic energy" of the whole track. For Allmusic, Marcy Donelson regarded the vocals as "shape-shifting" and "manipulated through either pitch-shifting or varied playback speed".

Lyrically, he presents a story of a strained relationship, being unsure of where he and his partner stand. Eventually, he confesses that he favours sex over feelings "by pushing harder for the physicality".

== Reception ==
=== Critical reception ===
New Wave Magazine praised the song: "...it’s evident that Artemas has honed his sound, delivering sharp and infectious vocal performances that leave a lasting impression." For Clash, Robin Murray was also laudatory: "Deeply catchy, ‘i like the way you kiss me’ bubbles with the coy thrills of attraction."

Daniel Dylan Wray of The Guardian called it "pulsating, icy synth-pop," describing the songwriting as "unabashed, unpolished lyricism".

=== Commercial performance ===
On 4 April 2024, "I Like the Way You Kiss Me" debuted on the UK Singles Chart at no. 13. On 25 April, the single peaked at no. 3 on the UK Singles Chart; as of the 8 August chart, the single has been on the UK Singles top 100 for 19 weeks.

In the US, "I Like the Way You Kiss Me" entered the Billboard Hot 100 chart at no. 70 on 6 April 2024. On 27 April, it peaked at no. 12.

By the end of April 2024, "I Like the Way You Kiss Me" had nearly 2.5 billion views on TikTok and topped the Spotify "Daily Top Songs Global" and Billboard Global Excl. US charts.

== Charts ==
=== Weekly charts ===
Weekly chart performance
Chart (2024)	Peak position
Australia (ARIA)	3
Austria (Ö3 Austria Top 40)	1
Belarus Airplay (TopHit)	1
Belgium (Ultratop 50 Flanders)	1
Belgium (Ultratop 50 Wallonia)	2
Bolivia (Billboard)	19
Brazil (Brasil Hot 100)	55
Bulgaria Airplay (PROPHON)	1
Canada (Canadian Hot 100)	6
Croatia (Billboard)	2
Croatia International Airplay (Top lista)	5
CIS Airplay (TopHit)	1
Czech Republic Airplay (ČNS IFPI)	1
Czech Republic Singles Digital (ČNS IFPI)	1
Denmark (Tracklisten)	2
Estonia Airplay (TopHit)	1
Finland (Suomen virallinen lista)	4
France (SNEP)	7
Germany (GfK)	1
Global 200 (Billboard)	2
Greece International (IFPI)	1
Hungary (Editors' Choice Top 40)	7
Hungary (Single Top 40)	1
Iceland (Tónlistinn)	3
India International (IMI)	6
Ireland (IRMA)	2
Israel (Mako Hitlist)	50
Italy (FIMI)	15
Kazakhstan Airplay (TopHit)	2
Latvia Airplay (LaIPA)	1
Latvia Streaming (LaIPA)	1
Lebanon (Lebanese Top 20)	4
Lithuania (AGATA)	1
Luxembourg (Billboard)	1
Malaysia International (RIM)	19
Middle East and North Africa (IFPI)	5
Moldova Airplay (TopHit)	1
Netherlands (Dutch Top 40)	12
Netherlands (Single Top 100)	4
New Zealand (Recorded Music NZ)	4
North Africa (IFPI)	18
Norway (VG-lista)	2
Peru (Billboard)	24
Poland (Polish Airplay Top 100)	1
Poland (Polish Streaming Top 100)	1
Portugal (AFP)	9
Romania (Billboard)	5
Romania Airplay (Media Forest)	1
Romania TV Airplay (Media Forest)	5
Russia Airplay (TopHit)	1
San Marino Airplay (SMRTV Top 50)	9
Saudi Arabia (IFPI)	5
Serbia Airplay (Radiomonitor)	5
Singapore (RIAS)	13
Slovakia Airplay (ČNS IFPI)	1
Slovakia Singles Digital (ČNS IFPI)	1
South Africa Streaming (TOSAC)	5
Spain (Promusicae)	21
Sweden (Sverigetopplistan)	1
Switzerland (Schweizer Hitparade)	1
Turkey International Airplay (Radiomonitor Türkiye)	7
Ukraine Airplay (TopHit)	2
United Arab Emirates (IFPI)	4
UK Singles (Official Charts)	3
US Billboard Hot 100	12
US Hot Rock & Alternative Songs (Billboard)	3
US Pop Airplay (Billboard)	36
Venezuela Airplay (Record Report)	65

=== Monthly charts ===
Monthly chart performance
Chart (2024)	Peak position
Belarus Airplay (TopHit)	1
CIS Airplay (TopHit)	1
Czech Republic (Rádio – Top 100)	2
Czech Republic (Singles Digitál – Top 100)	1
Estonia Airplay (TopHit)	3
Kazakhstan Airplay (TopHit)	8
Latvia Airplay (TopHit)	1
Lithuania Airplay (TopHit)	1
Moldova Airplay (TopHit)	2
Paraguay Airlay (SGP)	10
Romania Airplay (TopHit)	2
Russia Airplay (TopHit)	3
Slovakia (Rádio – Top 100)	2
Slovakia (Singles Digitál – Top 100)	1
Ukraine Airplay (TopHit)	4

=== Year-end charts ===
Year-end chart performance
Chart (2024)	Position
Australia (ARIA)	21
Austria (Ö3 Austria Top 40)	2
Belarus Airplay (TopHit)	5
Belgium (Ultratop 50 Flanders)	17
Belgium (Ultratop 50 Wallonia)	7
Bulgaria Airplay (PROPHON)	9
Canada (Canadian Hot 100)	43
CIS Airplay (TopHit)	4
Denmark (Tracklisten)	42
Estonia Airplay (TopHit)	8
France (SNEP)	39
Germany (GfK)	1
Global 200 (Billboard)	21
Hungary (Single Top 40)	24
Iceland (Tónlistinn)	10
Italy (FIMI)	49
Kazakhstan Airplay (TopHit)	43
Lithuania Airplay (TopHit)	3
Moldova Airplay (TopHit)	26
Netherlands (Dutch Top 40)	90
Netherlands (Single Top 100)	30
New Zealand (Recorded Music NZ)	30
Poland (Polish Airplay Top 100)	4
Poland (Polish Streaming Top 100)	3
Portugal (AFP)	43
Romania Airplay (TopHit)	11
Russia Airplay (TopHit)	19
Sweden (Sverigetopplistan)	13
Switzerland (Schweizer Hitparade)	4
UK Singles (OCC)	17
US Billboard Hot 100	63
US Hot Rock & Alternative Songs (Billboard)	9

Year-end chart performance
Chart (2025)	Position
Austria (Ö3 Austria Top 40)	62
Belarus Airplay (TopHit)	22
Belgium (Ultratop 50 Flanders)	160
Belgium (Ultratop 50 Wallonia)	122
CIS Airplay (TopHit)	43
Germany (GfK)	40
Global 200 (Billboard)	178
Lithuania Airplay (TopHit)	134
Moldova Airplay (TopHit)	13
Poland (Polish Airplay Top 100)	58
Romania Airplay (TopHit)	94
Russia Airplay (TopHit)	119

== Certifications ==
Certifications
Region	Certification	Certified units/sales
Australia (ARIA)	5× Platinum	350,000^{‡}
Austria (IFPI Austria)	2× Platinum	60,000^{‡}
Belgium (BRMA)	2× Platinum	80,000^{‡}
Canada (Music Canada)	2× Platinum	160,000^{‡}
Colombia (Promúsica)	Gold	
Denmark (IFPI Danmark)	Platinum	90,000^{‡}
France (SNEP)	Diamond	333,333^{‡}
Germany (BVMI)	3× Gold	900,000^{‡}
Italy (FIMI)	Platinum	100,000^{‡}
Mexico (AMPROFON)	Platinum	140,000^{‡}
Netherlands (NVPI)	Platinum	93,000^{‡}
New Zealand (RMNZ)	2× Platinum	60,000^{‡}
Norway (IFPI Norway)	Platinum	60,000^{‡}
Poland (ZPAV)	Diamond	250,000^{‡}
Portugal (AFP)	2× Platinum	20,000^{‡}
Spain (Promusicae)	Platinum	60,000^{‡}
Switzerland (IFPI Switzerland)	Platinum	30,000^{‡}
United Kingdom (BPI)	2× Platinum	1,200,000^{‡}
United States (RIAA)	3× Platinum	3,000,000^{‡}
Streaming
Sweden (GLF)	Platinum	12,000,000^{†}
^{‡} Sales+streaming figures based on certification alone.^{†} Streaming-only figures based on certification alone.
