= Ari Abdul =

American singer-songwriter (born 2001)

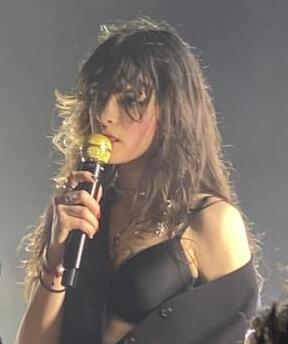
- Ari Abdul in 2026

Background information
- Born: Arianna Abdul; October 6, 2001 (age 25)
- Origin: Brooklyn, New York, U.S.
- Genres: Dark pop; alternative pop
- Occupation: Singer-songwriter
- Years active: 2022–present
- Labels: Slumbo Labs; RCA Records
- Website: ariabdul.com

Arianna Abdul (born October 6, 2001) is an American singer-songwriter from Brooklyn, New York. She has released two extended plays, 24 singles as a lead artist, and seven singles as a featured artist. She rose to prominence in 2022 following the release of her debut single "Babydoll". Abdul has embarked on four headlining concert tours and performed as an opening act for Nessa Barrett's Aftercare World Tour in 2025.

== Early life ==
Abdul was born and raised in Brooklyn, New York. Her father is Palestinian-Costa Rican and her mother is Ecuadorian.

Abdul was influenced by both Latin music from her mother and classic rock from her father. She also attributes Nirvana, Lana Del Rey, The Neighbourhood, Billie Eilish, and Arctic Monkeys as influencing her musical style.

== Career ==
=== 2022–2023: Career beginnings, EPs, singles ===
Abdul never considered a career as a musician until she released the song "Babydoll" in February 2022. She recorded the song in her bedroom and was convinced by a friend to put it on TikTok. The song went viral and landed her a deal with Slumbo Labs and RCA Records.

Abdul released her single "Taste" on June 21, 2022, which was described as a "bewitching piece of indie/electro-pop music" by Caesar Live N Loud. Three months later on September 7, Abdul released "Sinners", a duet with her and Thomas LaRosa. The following month on October 7, she released her debut extended play Fallen Angel, which features her singles "Babydoll", "Stay", and "Taste". The extended play was followed by a promotional tour in the United Kingdom and Europe which sold out.

On August 4, 2023, Abdul released "Make Me Cry", a collaborative song with Deadbeat Girl. That same month she toured in Europe and North America, including a performance at Lollapalooza Chicago. On October 13, 2023, Abdul followed up with her second EP, CCTV, which featured her single "Bury You" which was released a month prior. On December 15, 2023, Abdul and Two Feet released their single "Kill Anyone".

=== 2024–2025: Singles and live performances ===
On February 22, 2024, Abdul released "DFHMPU". In an interview with Fab UK, Abdul said that "'DFHMPU' is about self-worth. It describes being mistreated and recognizing you deserve better". She added that the song was written two years prior to its release date.

On April 3, 2024, Abdul performed with Isabel LaRosa and her brother Thomas LaRosa at the House of Blues in Dallas, Texas as a part of their co-headlining tour, the God’s Watching Tour. Ryn Taylor for RCA Records wrote that "Abdul's raspy vocals vibrated throughout the small venue", mentioning that both Isabel LaRosa and Abdul "entertained the crowd with their passion and pure connection with the fans".

From February 4, 2025, to March 6, 2025, Abdul appeared as the opening act for Nessa Barrett's second headlining concert tour Aftercare World Tour. Sarah Peter for Melodic Magazine wrote that Abdul left fans "energized and ready" for Barrett's headlining performance. Abdul performed songs such as "Bury You", "Worship", and "Haunt Your Dreams" during her opening set, closing off the show with a performance of "Babydoll".

Throughout 2025, Abdul released collaborations with Jutes, Chris Grey, Presley Regier, and Beach Weather in addition to her own singles. Shaun Quinn for WithGuitars magazine wrote that Abdul has "steadily evolved her sound while deepening her connection with fans". She continued to embark on her fourth headlining tour, the Change Tour, which ran from October 20, 2025, to March 31, 2026.

=== 2026–present: Singles, The Void ===
Abdul has released a sling of singles throughout 2026, including "Enamored", which "explores the overwhelming rush of wanting someone". In September 2026, she announced her debut album The Void, which includes her singles "Enamored", "Seductive", and "FMTYLM".

== Discography ==
=== Albums ===
List of Albums with selected details
Title	Details
The Void	Released: November 13, 2026; Label: RCA Records; Format: CD, digital download, streaming

=== EPs ===
List of EPs with selected details
Title	Details
Fallen Angel	Released: October 6, 2022; Label: RCA Records; Format: CD, digital download, streaming
CCTV	Released: October 13, 2023; Label: RCA Records; Format: CD, digital download, streaming

=== Singles ===
List of singles with selected details
Title	Year	Certification	Album
"Babydoll"	2022	RIAA: Gold	Fallen Angel
"Stay"	2022		Fallen Angel
"Taste"	2022		Fallen Angel
"Sinners" (featuring Thomas LaRosa)	2022		Non-album singles
"Bored"	2023		Non-album singles
"You"	2023		Non-album singles
"Haunt Your Dreams"	2023		Non-album singles
"Worship"	2023		Non-album singles
"Make Me Cry" (featuring Deadbeat Girl)	2023		Non-album singles
"Bury You"	2023		CCTV
"DFHMPU"	2024		Non-album singles
"Don't"	2024		Non-album singles
"Girls on the Internet"	2024		Non-album singles
"Sexy Spooky Skeleton" (featuring Ella Boh)	2024		Non-album singles
"Dreams"	2025		Non-album singles
"Alive"	2025		Non-album singles
"Leave Me Here"	2025		Non-album singles
"No Fair" (featuring Ella Boh)	2025		Non-album singles
"Mine"	2025		Non-album singles
"So Good"	2026		Non-album singles
"Ego"	2026		Non-album singles
"Enamored"	2026		The Void
"Seductive"	2026		The Void
"FMTYLM"	2026		The Void
"Nobody's Hero"	2026		The Void

==== As featured artist ====
List of singles as featured artist with selected details
Title	Year	Album
"Kill Anyone" (Two Feet featuring Ari Abdul)	2023	Non-album singles
"Let the World Burn" (Chris Grey featuring Ari Abdul and G-Eazy)	2024	Non-album singles
"Questions" (Presley Regier featuring Ari Abdul)	2024	Non-album singles
"Red Velvet" (Jutes featuring Ari Abdul)	2025	Non-album singles
"Hardcore Romance" (Beach Weather featuring Ari Abdul)	2025	Non-album singles
"Out Of Order" (Ella Boh featuring Ari Abdul)	2025	Milk & Honey
"Death Won't Do Us Part" (Chris Grey featuring Ari Abdul)	2025	Non-album singles
"Good Girl" (Magnolia Park featuring Ari Abdul}	2026	Non-album singles

== Tours ==
=== Headlining ===
- Hellgirl Tour (2023)
- CCTV Tour (2024)
- God's Watching Tour (with Isabel LaRosa) (2024)
- Change Tour (2025–2026)

=== Supporting ===
- Aftercare World Tour - (Nessa Barrett) (2025)
