= Hell Is a Teenage Girl =

EP by Nessa Barrett
- Released: July 14, 2023
- Recorded: 2022–2023
- Genres: Alternative pop; pop-rock
- Length: 25:31
- Label: Warner
- Producer: Evan Blair

Nessa Barrett chronology
Young Forever (2022)	Hell Is a Teenage Girl (2023)	Aftercare (2024)

Singles from Hell Is a Teenage Girl
- 1. "Bang Bang!" Released: February 17, 2023; 2. "American Jesus" Released: April 28, 2023; 3. "Lie" Released: June 23, 2023

Hell Is a Teenage Girl (stylized in all lowercase) is the second extended play (EP) by American singer-songwriter Nessa Barrett. It was released on July 14, 2023 by Warner Records. The project covers themes of borderline personality disorder, religion, heartbreak, slut-shaming and mental health. The title Hell Is a Teenage Girl came from the first line of the 2009 film Jennifer's Body.

== Critical reception ==
Hell Is a Teenage Girl received mixed reviews from critics. Tomás Mier of Rolling Stone praised "Bang Bang!" upon its release, noting Barrett's ability to effectively communicate themes of borderline personality disorder in her music. Jacob Uitti for American Songwriter compared the EP to the likes of Lana Del Rey and The Weeknd. Uitti praised Barrett's vulnerability and honesty in her songwriting, comparing the track list to messages in a bottle. He further characterized the EP as one that lyrically and sonically "pushes you with a bouncy, driving tune. So much so that you want more." He criticized the EP for "too closely [participating] in what's become generic pop music". Alessandra Rincon praised Barrett's songwriting and versatility in review for Ones to Watch. Rincon highlights the EP's themes of misogyny and sexism on the title track "Hell Is a Teenage Girl". Olivia McCormack for The Washington Post praised Barrett's growth from her 2021 single "I Hope Ur Miserable Until Ur Dead" and debut album Young Forever.

== Songs ==
"Bang Bang!" was released as the lead single for the EP on February 17, 2023. Nmesoma Okechukwu of Euphoria magazine compared the song to Olivia Rodrigo's 2021 track "Brutal". "Bang Bang!" was released along with a black & white music video directed by Hunter Lyon. The second single, "American Jesus" was released on April 28, 2023 accompanied by a music video directed by Loris Russier. The track was performed on Barrett's sold out Young Forever Tour before its official release. "Lie" was released on June 23, 2023 as the EPs third single along with a music video directed by Loris Russier. Barrett announced the track's release date via a mock wedding invitation posted on Instagram, correlating with the songs lyrical themes and music video. The title track, "Hell Is a Teenage Girl", was the EP's final single release, coinciding with the project's digital release on July 14, 2023. The song was a promotional single released alongside a music video directed by VMA Award winning director Andrew Donoho.

In May 2024, Barrett joined Lana Del Rey on stage to perform the EPs second single "American Jesus" at the Hangout Music Festival in Alabama. Barrett has cited Del Rey as a major influence in her career.

== Tour ==
Barrett announced her second headlining tour, the "Church Club for the Lonely Tour" in support of Hell Is a Teenage Girl on August 21, 2023 with dates across the United States. On September 18, 2023 she announced an Australian/New Zealand leg. The tour began on October 6, 2023 in Austin and concluded on December 19, 2023 in Auckland. The tour was supported by May-a and Oliver Cronin for the United States and Australia/New Zealand dates respectively.

Rolling Stone reported that the tour received positive reviews from concert-goers, with Unraveled Edit speaking on Barrett's performance: "Nessa Barrett didn't just deliver a concert; she created a night full of emotions, leaving a lasting imprint on the hearts of her Australian fans".

== Track listing ==
Hell Is a Teenage Girl track listing
No.	Title	Writer(s)	Producer(s)	Length
1.	"Hell Is a Teenage Girl"	Nessa Barrett; Evan Blair; Madi Yanofsky; Sarah Solovay	Evan Blair	3:15
2.	"The One That Should've Got Away"	Barrett; Blair; Yanofsky; Solovay; Sean Kennedy	Blair	3:34
3.	"Lie"	Barrett; Blair; Yanofsky	Blair	3:34
4.	"Plane to Paris"	Barrett; Blair; Yanofsky; Solovay	Blair	3:54
5.	"Heartbreak in the Hamptons"	Barrett; Blair; Yanofsky	Blair	2:35
6.	"American Jesus"	Barrett; Blair; Yanofsky; Solovay	Blair	2:48
7.	"Motel Whore"	Barrett	Blair	3:33
8.	"Bang Bang!"	Barrett; Blair; Yanofsky; Solovay	Blair	2:16
Total length:				25:31

Notes

- Tracks 1–7 are stylized in all lowercase.
- "Bang Bang!" is stylized in all uppercase.

== Release history ==
List of release dates and formats
Region	Date	Format(s)	Label	Ref.
Various	July 14, 2023	Digital download; streaming	Warner Records	
