= If U Think I'm Pretty =

2023 single by Artemas

Single by Artemas

from the album Pretty
- Released: 24 October 2023
- Genre: Alternative R&B; electronic
- Length: 2:08
- Label: Self-released
- Songwriters: Artemas Diamandis; Toby Daintree
- Producers: Artemas; White; Daintree

Artemas singles chronology
"Cross My Heart" (2023)	"If U Think I'm Pretty" (2023)	"Just Want U to Feel Something" (2023)

"If U Think I'm Pretty" is a song by English singer-songwriter Artemas. It was released independently on 24 October 2023 as the second single from his debut mixtape Pretty (2024).

Ian Hansen from Sheesh Media called the song "a mesmerising blend of dark R&B and electronic elements, featuring powerful basslines, groovy vibes and an anthemic atmosphere."

== Charts ==
Chart performance for "If U Think I'm Pretty"
Chart (2024)	Peak position
Australia (ARIA)	30
Austria (Ö3 Austria Top 40)	42
Canada (Canadian Hot 100)	74
Germany (GfK)	94
Global 200 (Billboard)	113
Greece International (IFPI)	46
Ireland (IRMA)	36
Latvia Streaming (LaIPA)	10
Lithuania Airplay (TopHit)	109
Poland (Polish Streaming Top 100)	59
Switzerland (Schweizer Hitparade)	92
UK Singles (Official Charts)	39
US Hot Rock & Alternative Songs (Billboard)	16

== Certifications ==
Certifications for "If U Think I'm Pretty"
Region	Certification	Certified units/sales
Australia (ARIA)	Platinum	70,000^{‡}
Canada (Music Canada)	Gold	40,000^{‡}
France (SNEP)	Gold	100,000^{‡}
New Zealand (RMNZ)	Platinum	30,000^{‡}
Poland (ZPAV)	Platinum	50,000^{‡}
United Kingdom (BPI)	Gold	400,000^{‡}
United States (RIAA)	Platinum	1,000,000^{‡}
^{‡} Sales+streaming figures based on certification alone.
