= Artemas (musician) =

English-Cypriot singer-songwriter (born 1999)

- Born: Artemas Diamandis; 23 September 1999 (age 27)
- Origin: Oxfordshire, England
- Genres: Alternative pop; alternative R&B; dark wave
- Occupations: Producer; singer; songwriter
- Instruments: Vocals; guitar; keyboards
- Years active: 2019–present
- Label: 10K Projects
- Website: www.artemas.uk

Artemas Diamandis (Greek: Αρτέμας Διαμαντής; born 23 September 1999), known mononymously as Artemas, is an English singer, songwriter and record producer. He is best known for his singles "If U Think I'm Pretty" and the viral "I Like the Way You Kiss Me". He is signed to the record label 10K Projects.

== Early life ==
Born on 23 September 1999, Artemas grew up in a village in Oxfordshire, England, and is of Greek Cypriot descent from his father's side. He had piano lessons aged six and developed an interest in singing. He was educated at Radley College. Watching a documentary about Kurt Cobain titled Kurt Cobain: Montage of Heck inspired him to begin writing songs at the age of 16. Artemas taught himself to play instruments and produce, and began experimenting with music styles. He moved to London to further his music career.

== Career ==
At the age of 17, Artemas made his first so-called "very bad rock song", which was played on local radio.

Artemas' first music release was the single "High 4 U" in November 2020. In 2022 he released the mixtape I'm Sorry I'm Like This, which remains available on Bandcamp. The same year his sound was compared to that of Rex Orange County "with a hint of R&B". On 24 October 2023 Artemas released the single "If U Think I'm Pretty" which went viral shortly after. By 2024, the song had reached the UK and other European countries as well as in Canada and Australia. The single led to the release of his debut mixtape Pretty in February 2024.

On 19 March 2024 he released the single "I Like the Way You Kiss Me", which reached number one in Austria, Belgium (Flanders), Germany, Poland, Sweden, Switzerland, Latvia and Lithuania, number three in the UK, and number twelve in the US, and peaked within the top ten of the charts in countries including Australia, New Zealand, Ireland, and Norway. Variety described it as one of the "most ubiquitous songs of 2024". The single led to the release of his sophomore mixtape Yustyna in July 2024.

Artemas' fourth mixtape Lovercore, was released on 24 October 2025.

Artemas' fifth mixtape Getting Up to No Good was released on 27 March 2026.

== Discography ==
=== Mixtapes ===
List of mixtapes, with selected details, and selected chart positions
Title	Details	Peak chart positions		
Title	Details	AUS Hit.	LTU	US
I'm Sorry I'm Like This	Released: 6 May 2022; Label: Artemas; Format: Digital download, streaming	—	—	—
Pretty	Released: 9 February 2024; Label: Artemas; Format: Digital download, streaming	18	9	—
Yustyna	Released: 11 July 2024; Label: Artemas; Format: Digital download, streaming	—	8	147
Lovercore	Released: 24 October 2025; Label: Artemas; Format: Digital download, streaming	—	88	—
Getting Up to No Good	Released: 27 March 2026; Label: Artemas; Format: Digital download, streaming	—	—	—
"—" denotes a recording that did not chart in that territory.

=== Singles ===
List of charted singles, with selected chart positions, certifications, and album name
Title	Year	Peak chart positions										Certifications	Album	
Title	Year	UK	AUS	AUT	CAN	GER	LAT Stream.	SWE	SWI	US	WW	Certifications	Album	
"If U Think I'm Pretty"	2023	39	30	42	74	94	10	— (Note: "If U Think I'm Pretty" did not enter the Swedish Singellista Chart, but peaked at number five on the Swedish Heatseeker Chart.)	92	— (Note: "If U Think I'm Pretty" did not enter the Billboard Hot 100, but peaked at number 14 on the Bubbling Under Hot 100 chart.)	113	BPI: Gold; ARIA: Platinum; MC: Gold; RIAA: Platinum	Pretty	
"cross my heart"	2023	—	—	—	—	—	—	—	—	—	—		Pretty	
"just want u to feel something"	2023	—	—	—	—	—	—	—	—	—	—		Pretty	
"Tattoos"	2023	—	—	—	—	—	—	—	—	—	—		Pretty	
"I Like the Way You Kiss Me"	2024	3	3	1	6	1	1	1	1	12	2	BPI: 2× Platinum; ARIA: 5× Platinum; BVMI: 3× Gold; GLF: Platinum; IFPI AUT: 2× Platinum; IFPI SWI: Platinum; MC: 2× Platinum; RIAA: 3× Platinum	Yustyna	
"how could u love somebody like me?"	2024		—	—	—	—	—	—	—	—	—	—		
"dirty little secret"	2024		—	—	—	—	—	—	—	—	—	—		Yustyna
"i always kinda knew you'd be the death of me"	2024		—	—	—	—	—	—	—	—	—	—		Yustyna
"wet dreams"	2024		—	—	—	—	—	—	—	—	—	—		Yustyna
"MUSTANG BABY" (with Nessa Barrett)	2024		—	—	—	—	—	—	—	—	—	—		AFTERCARE
"caroline"	2024		—	—	—	—	—	—	—	—	—	—		Yustyna
"southbound"	2025	—	—	—	—	—	—	—	—	—	—		LOVERCORE	
"time alone w u"	2025	—	—	—	—	—	—	—	—	—	—		getting up to no good	
"BRAIN" (with Diplo and d00mscrvll)	2025	—	—	—	—	—	—	—	—	—	—		getting up to no good	
"superstar"	2025	—	—	—	—	—	—	—	—	—	—			
"i kinda like how u know just how beautiful u are"	2026	—	—	—	—	—	—	—	—	—	—			
"more than just a little bit"	2026	—	—	—	—	—	—	—	—	—	—			
"—" denotes a recording that did not chart in that territory.
