= Young Forever (Nessa Barrett album) =

Studio album by Nessa Barrett
- Released: October 14, 2022
- Recorded: 2021–2022
- Genres: Alternative pop; pop rock; dark pop
- Length: 35:54
- Label: Warner
- Producer: Evan Blair

Nessa Barrett chronology
Pretty Poison (2021)	Young Forever (2022)	Hell Is a Teenage Girl (2023)

Singles from Young Forever
- 1. "Die First" Released: June 24, 2022; 2. "Madhouse" Released: September 9, 2022; 3. "Tired of California" Released: October 7, 2022

Young Forever is the debut studio album by American singer Nessa Barrett. The album was released on October 14, 2022, by Warner Records, with the extended edition being released digitally on November 18, 2022.

== Touring ==
In 2023, Barrett performed her first headlining tour dubbed the Young Forever Tour. The tour consisted of 25 dates across North America and Europe from February 22, 2023 to May 23, 2023. Isabel LaRosa and Daniel Briskin served as supporting acts for the North American and European legs respectively.

== Critical reception ==
Caitlin Conmy of The Bubble indicated that the work "presents a powerful commentary on mental health, in particular borderline personality disorder (BPD) which Nessa has openly spoken about struggling with".

Shannon Shumaker of Prelude Press stated that "Comprised of thirteen confessional, personal tracks, young forever finds the twenty year-old looking inward and dissecting the music scene while she balances growing up while being thrust into stardom".

== Track listing ==
Standard edition
No.	Title	Writer(s)	Producer(s)	Length
1.	"Tired of California"	Nessa Barrett; Evan Blair; Sarah Solovay; Sean Kennedy; Suzanne Vega; Victoria Zaro	Evan Blair	3:10
2.	"Gaslight"	Barrett; Blair; Jesse Fink; Skyler Stonestreet	Blair	3:16
3.	"Talk to Myself"	Barrett; Blair; Madi Yanofsky	Blair	2:45
4.	"Fuckmarrykill"	Barrett; Blair; Megan Bülow; Elizabeth Lowell Boland	Blair	3:33
5.	"Dear God"	Barrett; Blair; Simon Wilcox	Blair	2:12
6.	"Forgive the World"	Barrett; Blair; David Brook; Riley Biederer; Teal Douville	Blair	2:28
7.	"Too Hot to Cry"	Barrett; Blair; Yanofsky	Blair	3:08
8.	"Madhouse"	Barrett; Blair; Boland; Bülow	Blair	2:05
9.	"Unnecessary Violence"	Barrett; Blair; Yanofsky	Blair	3:15
10.	"Lovebomb"	Barrett; Blair; Yanofsky	Blair	3:09
11.	"Decay"	Barrett; Blair; Yanofsky; Pete Nappi; Elijah Noll	Blair	2:29
12.	"Die First"	Barrett; Blair; Yanofsky; Noll	Blair	2:57
13.	"Lucky Star"	Barrett; Blair	Blair	3:21
Total length:				35:54

Extended edition
No.	Title	Writer(s)	Producer(s)	Length
14.	"Deathmatch"	Barrett; Brandon Colbein; Blair; Asia Whiteacre	Blair	2:41
15.	"Do You Really Want to Hurt Me?"	Barrett; Blair; Culture Club	Blair	2:09
16.	"God's Favorite"	Barrett; Blair; Caroline Ailin	Blair	2:58
17.	"505"	Alex Turner	Blair	3:00
18.	"Noose"	Barrett; Collin Joseph Maguire; Tillis James Churchill III	Ship Wrek	2:20
Total length:				49:06

=== Notes ===
- All tracks are stylized in all lowercase.
- "Do You Really Want to Hurt Me?" contains an interpolation of Culture Club's "Do You Really Want to Hurt Me" (1982)
- "505" is a cover of the Arctic Monkeys 2007 song "505"
- "Fuckmarrykill" is not present on clean versions of the album.

== Charts ==
Chart (2022)	Peak position
Australian Albums (ARIA)	63
Belgian Albums (Ultratop Flanders)	94
Canadian Albums (Billboard)	45
Irish Albums (Official Charts)	49
New Zealand Albums (RMNZ)	39
UK Albums (Official Charts)	89
US Billboard 200	80
US Billboard Top Rock & Alternative Albums	15

== Release history ==
List of release dates and formats
Region	Date	Format(s)	Edition	Label	Ref.
Various	October 14, 2022	Digital download; streaming; Vinyl LP; CD	Standard	Warner Records	
Various	November 18, 2022	Streaming; digital download	Extended edition	Warner Records	
Various	October 14, 2026	Vinyl LP	Extended edition	Warner Records	
