= Babydoll (Ari Abdul song) =

Single by Ari Abdul

from the EP Fallen Angel
- Released: February 22, 2022
- Genre: Alternative pop
- Length: 3:16
- Songwriters: Ari Abdul; Isabel LaRosa; Thomas LaRosa
- Producer: Thomas LaRosa

Ari Abdul singles chronology
"Babydoll" (2022)	"Stay" (2022)

Music video
- "BABYDOLL" on YouTube

"Babydoll" (stylized in all caps) is the debut single by American singer-songwriter Ari Abdul. It was released on February 22, 2022. The song received a RIAA Gold certification, making it Ari's first RIAA certification. The song received more than 200 million streams on the sped up and normal versions of the song.

== Background ==
Ari first started recording Babydoll in 2021, when her best friend, Thomas LaRosa, asked her if she wanted to make a song. She reluctantly agreed, and recorded it. Later, they made the sped up version of Babydoll, which grew traction and blew up. Her co-writers, Isabel LaRosa, Thomas, and herself finished the song and released it in February 2022.

== Music videos ==
There are two videos released along with the song. One lyric video and one music video for the sped up version of the song.

== Certifications ==
Certifications for "Babydoll"
Region	Certification	Certified units/sales
France (SNEP)	Gold	100,000^{‡}
New Zealand (RMNZ)	Gold	15,000^{‡}
Poland (ZPAV)	Platinum	50,000^{‡}
United Kingdom (BPI)	Silver	200,000^{‡}
United States (RIAA)	Gold	500,000^{‡}
^{‡} Sales+streaming figures based on certification alone.
