= Let the World Burn (song) =

2024 single by Chris Grey

Single by Chris Grey

from the album The Castle Never Falls
- Released: March 8, 2024
- Genre: R&B
- Length: 2:43
- Label: Rebellion
- Songwriters: Christopher Graham; Allegra Maizels
- Producer: Chris Grey

Chris Grey singles chronology
"Prada & Versace" (2024)	"Let the World Burn" (2024)	"Haunted" (2024)

Music video
- "Let the World Burn" on YouTube

Remix cover
- Cover art of the official remix with G-Eazy and Ari Abdul.

"Let the World Burn" (stylized in all caps) is a song by Canadian singer Chris Grey, released on March 8, 2024 as the third single from his debut studio album, The Castle Never Falls (2024). Considered his breakout hit, it went viral in 2025 when it became widely used as a background track for social media clips. The song has received three official remixes: one with American rapper G-Eazy and American singer Ari Abdul on November 8, 2024, one with R3bel and Kryd, titled "Let the World Burn (Hoodtrap / Mylancore Remix)", on September 30, 2025., and one with R3bel and American rapper Lil Mabu released in early 2026, titled "Let the World Burn - Lil Mabu Remix".

== Charts ==
Chart performance for "Let the World Burn"
Chart (2026)	Peak position
Greece International (IFPI)	50
India International (IMI)	17

Chart performance for "Let the World Burn" (Remix with G-Eazy and Ari Abdul)
Chart (2025)	Peak position
Portugal (AFP)	92

Chart performance for "Let the World Burn" (Hoodtrap / Mylancore Remix)
Chart (2025–2026)	Peak position
Canada (Canadian Hot 100)	75
Global 200 (Billboard)	129
US Bubbling Under Hot 100 (Billboard)	4
US Hot Dance/Electronic Songs (Billboard)	3

== Certifications ==
Certifications and sales for "Let the World Burn"
Region	Certification	Certified units/sales
New Zealand (RMNZ)	Gold	15,000^{‡}
Portugal (AFP) Remix with G-Eazy and Ari Abdul	Gold	12,000^{‡}
Streaming
Greece (IFPI Greece)	Gold	1,000,000^{†}
^{‡} Sales+streaming figures based on certification alone.^{†} Streaming-only figures based on certification alone.
