= Desert rock =

Desert rock may refer to

== Music ==
- Palm Desert Scene, a Californian music culture that has been described as "desert rock"
- North African and Saharan desert blues or desert rock music
- Desert Rock, a musical project formed by British blues rock guitarist Ramon Goose
- Dubai Desert Rock Festival, an event celebrating various styles of rock and metal music on one stage in Dubai, United Arab Emirates

== Other uses ==
- Desert Rock exercises, a series of exercises conducted by the U.S. military in conjunction with atmospheric nuclear tests
  - Camp Desert Rock, a former staging base for troops participating in the Desert Rock exercises
- Desert Rock Airport, a private-use airport located near the central business district of Mercury, in Nye County, Nevada, United States
- Mt. Desert Rock, an island of Maine home to the Mount Desert Light lighthouse

== See also ==
- Desert § Physical geography
