= Pretty Poison (EP) =

EP by Nessa Barrett
- Released: September 10, 2021
- Genre: Punk-pop
- Length: 17:30
- Label: Warner
- Producers: Evan Blair; Tim Randolph; Marty Maro; Pete Nappi; Robbie Soukiasyan

Nessa Barrett chronology
Pretty Poison (2021)	Young Forever (2022)

Singles from Pretty Poison
- 1. "I Hope Ur Miserable Until Ur Dead" Released: August 6, 2021

Pretty Poison (stylized in all lowercase) is the debut extended play (EP) from American singer-songwriter Nessa Barrett. It was released on September 10, 2021, by Warner Records. Pretty Poison was released in honor of World Suicide Prevention Day, with Barrett citing the EP as her "therapy".

Pretty Poison has been described as a punk-pop extended play that covers themes of mental health and fame. The EPs lead single "I Hope Ur Miserable Until Ur Dead" debuted at number 88 on the Billboard Hot 100, becoming her first entry on the chart. Upon its radio impact, it was the most added song on the US Alternative Airplay chart.

== Background ==
Barrett was signed to Warner Records in 2020 after her singing videos on TikTok gained traction online. Her single "La Di Die" with Jaden Hossler had amassed over 200 million streams worldwide by the release of Pretty Poison, landing Barrett and Hossler television performances on Jimmy Kimmel Live! and the Ellen DeGeneres Show.

Barrett was named the "On the Rise" artist by Line of Best Fit in June 2021, citing Lana Del Rey, the Neighbourhood and Arctic Monkeys as influences for her upcoming EP; which was revealed to be Pretty Poison releasing September of that year.

== Critical reception ==
Jo Forrest of TotalNtertainment stated that "Illuminating the scope of her signature style, she leans into a lullaby melody on the darkly catchy ‘grave’, while ‘i wanna die’ feels tailormade for the closing credits of a classic nineties slasher flick".

Megan Armstrong of Billboard magazine stated "each single gradually built her up in a way that eventually made her confident enough to really go there across Pretty Poison’s seven tracks".

== Track listing ==
Standard edition
No.	Title	Writer(s)	Producer(s)	Length
1.	"Pretty Poison"	Nessa Barrett; Evan Blair; Kennedi Lykken; Tim Randolph	Evan Blair; Tim Randolph	2:17
2.	"Keep Me Afraid"	Barrett; Blair; Cara Salimando; Marty Rod	Blair; Marty Maro	2:44
3.	"I Hope Ur Miserable Until Ur Dead"	Barrett; Blair; Randolph; Madi Yanofsky; Samuel Mark Catalano	Blair	2:57
4.	"Grave"	Barrett; Blair; Randolph; Sean Kennedy; Asia Whiteacre	Blair	2:27
5.	"Scare Myself"	Barrett; Blair; Yanofsky; Pete Nappi; Danny Silberstein	Blair; Pete Nappi	3:13
6.	"I Wanna Die"	Barrett; Blair; Whiteacre; Robbie Soukiasyan	Blair; Robbie Soukiasyn	2:46
7.	"Sincerely"	Barrett; Blair	Blair	1:08
Total length:				17:30

== Release history ==
List of release dates and formats
Region	Date	Format(s)	Label	Ref.
Various	September 10, 2021	Digital download; streaming	Warner Records	
Various	November 19, 2021	CD	Warner Records	
Various	November 20, 2026	Vinyl LP	Warner Records	
