= Nessa Barrett =

American singer-songwriter and media personality (born 2002)

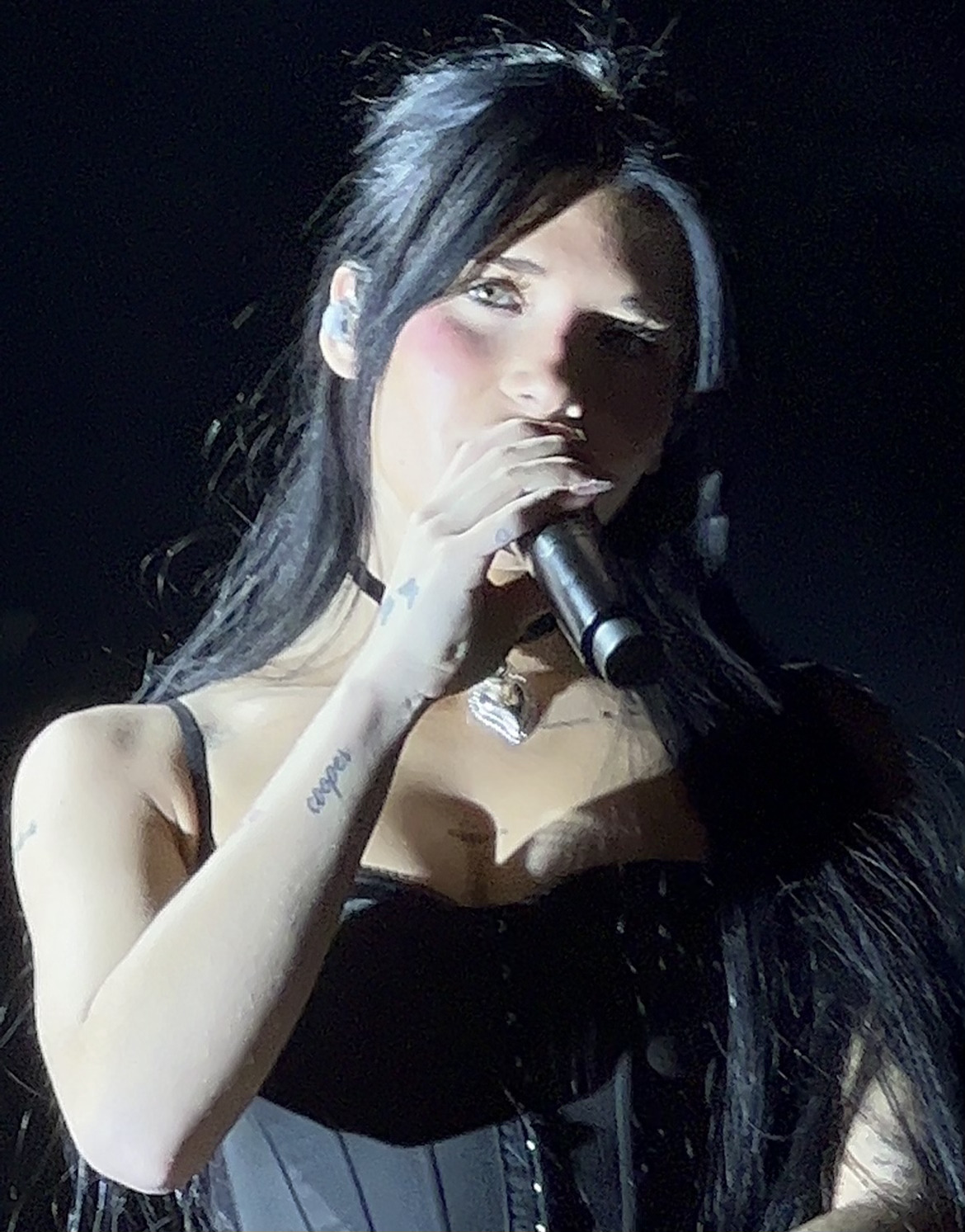
- Barrett in 2023

Background information
- Born: Janesa Jaida Barrett; August 6, 2002 (age 24); Galloway Township, New Jersey, U.S.
- Genres: Pop rock; dark pop; alternative pop
- Occupations: Singer; songwriter
- Instruments: Vocals; bass guitar
- Works: Discography
- Years active: 2019–present
- Label: Warner
- Website: nessa-barrett.com

TikTok information
- Page: nessaabarrett
- Followers: 19.4 million
- Last updated: September 18, 2026

Janesa Jaida "Nessa" Barrett (born August 6, 2002) is an American singer-songwriter and social media personality. She rose to prominence on TikTok and began uploading song covers as a teenager, which led her to sign a recording contract with Warner Records. She released her debut single, "Pain", in 2020. In 2021, she released her debut EP, Pretty Poison, which combined elements of alternative pop and pop-rock. She then released her debut album, Young Forever, the following year. In 2023, she released another EP, Hell Is a Teenage Girl, and in 2024, she released her second studio album, Aftercare, which incorporated electropop and synthpop. In 2026, Barrett released her EP, Jesus Loves a Primadonna. In July of that same year, she announced her third studio album Tough Love, which released on September 25, 2026.

== Early life ==
Barrett is of Puerto Rican descent. She was born and raised in Galloway Township, New Jersey. During adolescence, Barrett felt alienated due to being the only Puerto Rican and one of the few children being raised by a single mother, following the divorce of her parents. Barrett said she has been writing songs "since [she] could walk and talk".

== Career ==
=== 2019–2021: Career beginnings and Pretty Poison ===
In 2019, Barrett began posting videos on TikTok, which led to a recording contract with Warner Records. In July 2020, she released her piano‑based ballad debut single, "Pain".

In October 2020, she released her second single, "If U Love Me". In December 2020, Barrett released a dark interpretation of "Santa Baby". In February 2021, she released the track "La Di Die", which explores the downfalls of fame with Jxdn and was produced by Travis Barker. Barrett, Jxdn, and Barker performed the single live for the first time on the April 7, 2021 episode of Jimmy Kimmel Live! and again on The Ellen DeGeneres Show on April 12, 2021.

On June 25, 2021, Barrett released "Counting Crimes", a song she described as "about moving on from something toxic". In August 2021, her song "I Hope Ur Miserable Until Ur Dead" debuted at number 88 on the Billboard Hot 100, marking her first entry on the chart. Her debut EP, Pretty Poison, containing seven new tracks, was released on September 10, 2021, coinciding with World Suicide Prevention Day.

=== 2022–2023: Young Forever and Hell Is a Teenage Girl ===
Barrett released the single "Dying on the Inside" in February 2022.

In June 2022, she released "Die First" as the lead single from her debut studio album. The song is dedicated to her friend Cooper Noriega, who had recently died from an accidental drug overdose. In the track, Barrett sings about hoping to never experience the pain of losing her mother, expressing a desire to be the first to pass between the two of them.

On September 9, 2022, she released "Madhouse", the album’s second single. The song addresses mental health struggles, slut-shaming, and bullying. In October 2022, she released "Tired of California", the album’s third single, followed by the full release of Young Forever. In December 2022, she announced her Young Forever Tour featuring Isabel LaRosa, performing twenty shows beginning in February 2023.

In February 2023, she released the single "Bang Bang!" followed by "American Jesus" (previously performed acoustically on the Young Forever Tour) in April 2023 and "lie" in June 2023. All three singles were later included on her EP Hell Is a Teenage Girl, released on July 14, 2023. On September 8, 2023, she released the single "Sick of Myself" featuring Whethan. On October 6, 2023, she released another single dedicated to Cooper Noriega, titled "Club Heaven", accompanied by a music video. On December 8, 2023, she released the single "Girl in New York", which she had previously performed.

=== 2024–present: Aftercare, Jesus Loves a Primadonna and Tough Love ===
On January 18, 2024, she released "Club Heaven" (Live from Spotify Green Screen). Barrett’s second album, Aftercare, was released in November 2024. It was preceded by the lead single "Passenger Princess", released in July 2024. The album also included the singles "Disco" featuring Tommy Genesis and "Dirty Little Secret". A deluxe edition of Aftercare, containing six new tracks, was released on February 7, 2025.

On January 16, 2026, she released the single "High on Heaven", which she performed on Triple J on January 15, 2026. On February 27, 2026, she released "Stay with Me" and announced her next EP, Jesus Loves a Primadonna, which was released on March 20, 2026.

In 2026, it was announced that Barrett would be an opener for The Neighbourhood’s upcoming tour. The band has been cited as a major influence on her decision to pursue music.

In July 2026, Barrett announced her third studio album Tough Love, which released on September 25.

== Artistry ==
Barrett cites Arctic Monkeys, Lana Del Rey, Melanie Martinez, and The Neighbourhood as influences on both her sound and her aesthetic as a musician.

== Personal life ==
Barrett has been open about her mental health issues, including depression, borderline personality disorder (BPD), suicidal thoughts, and eating disorders such as anorexia and bulimia. She began therapy at the age of six and has spoken publicly about experiencing her first suicide attempt at fourteen, after which she was admitted to a psychiatric hospital. At seventeen, after initial objections from her parents, she moved to Los Angeles to pursue career opportunities. She was diagnosed with BPD at eighteen.

She has also discussed the emotional impact of the 2022 death of her best friend Cooper Noriega, a fellow TikTok creator who died of an accidental drug overdose. Following his passing, Barrett was hospitalized again, and she later dedicated her singles “Die First” and “Club Heaven” to him. She has said that "Die First" was originally written about her mother but was rededicated to Noriega after his death.

In an interview with Zach Sang, Barrett stated that her Christian faith played an important role in helping her cope with her mental health challenges and with Noriega’s death.

Barrett is bisexual. She began dating fellow social media star Josh Richards in November 2019; the two broke up in March 2021. She then dated Jaden Hossler (also known as Jxdn) and later addressed engagement rumors following their breakup in May 2022.

After her breakup with Hossler, Barrett was linked to model Harley Solomon, who is reported to be the nephew of the owners of the fashion brand Chrome Hearts. The two were photographed together, leading to public speculation about their relationship, though neither confirmed it publicly.

== Tours ==
=== Headlining ===
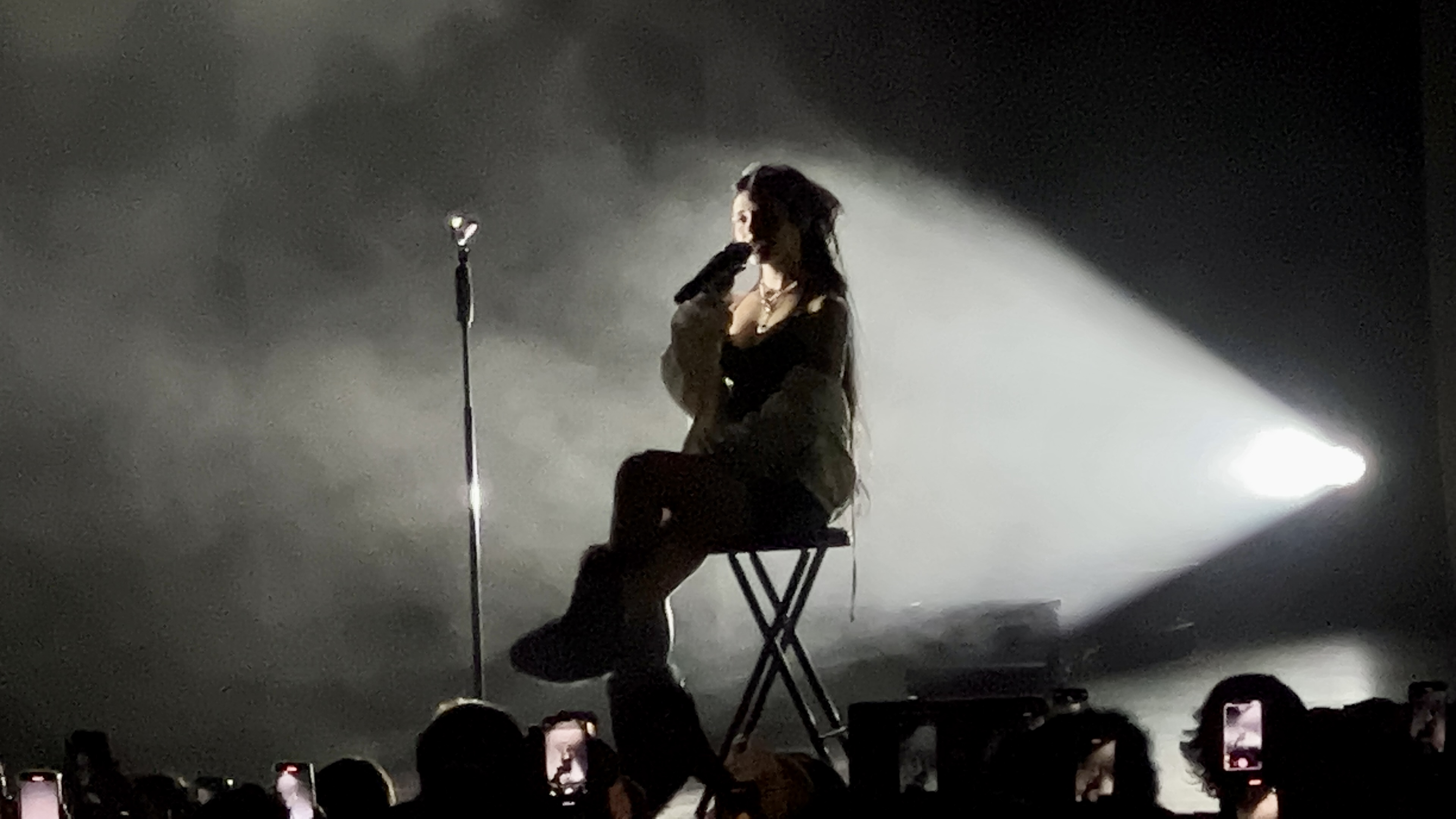
Barrett performing at the Palace Theater in 2023

- Young Forever Tour (2023)
- Church Club for the Lonely Tour (2023)
- Aftercare World Tour (2025)
- Jesus Loves a Primadonna: An Intimate Evening with Nessa Barrett (2026)
- Tough Love Tour (2027)

=== Supporting ===
- The Neighbourhood – Wourld Tour (2026)

== Discography ==
- Young Forever (2022)
- Aftercare (2024)
- Tough Love (2026)

== Awards and nominations ==
Barrett was named to Billboard's "21 Under 21" and was featured on Ones to Watch's list of "25 Artists to Watch in 2022", Uproxx's "Next Hitmakers List" and People's Emerging Artist List.

Year	Award	Category	Recipient(s) and nominee(s)	Result	Ref.
2021	iHeartRadio Music Awards	Social Star	Herself	Nominated	
2022	MTV Video Music Awards	Push Performance of the Year	"I Hope Ur Miserable Until Ur Dead"	Nominated	
2022	MTV Europe Music Awards	Best Push	Herself	Nominated	
2022	BreakTudo Awards	International Best New Artist	Herself	Won	
