= Zach Sang =

American radio personality

Zach Sang (born May 2, 1993) is an American radio personality, podcaster, and media producer, best known for his work as the host of The Zach Sang Show. He began his broadcasting career at the age of 14 from his parents' home in Wayne, New Jersey, where he developed an early interest in radio and news media. Sang gained prominence hosting Zach Sang & The Student Body on Goom Radio and went on to create Zang Radio, a popular teen-focused station.

Sang has interviewed a wide array of celebrities, including Justin Bieber, Miley Cyrus, BTS, Faouzia, and Ariana Grande. From 2012 to 2022, he hosted Zach Sang and The Gang, which rebranded as The Zach Sang Show, airing on over 70 stations across the U.S. and 13 in Canada. In 2022, Sang relaunched his show on Amazon's Amp platform, continuing to engage a primarily teen audience with celebrity interviews and interactive segments.

== Early life ==
Sang worked in a local grocery store when he began broadcasting from his parents' home in Wayne, New Jersey at 14 years old. Sang was interested in the local news and studied Al Roker and Bill Evans from ABC 7 in New York. He stated that the WPLJ radio station was one he loved and would listen to Scott & Todd every morning. Two stations would hold a summer softball game against each other that Sang would beg his mother to take him to so he could talk to the radio stars.

== Career ==
He quickly amassed an online following from his home studio. Sang hosted "Zach Sang & The Student Body" on Goom Radio, an online radio venture. He served as the creator, executive producer and music director of Zang Radio, one of the biggest teen radio stations at the time. Zach currently hosts a weekend countdown that airs nationally in Canada on Rogers Media's Kiss Radio stations.

Over the course of his career, he has interviewed hundreds of celebrities including Justin Bieber, Miley Cyrus, Olivia Rodrigo, Kylie Minogue, the Kid Laroi, Shawn Mendes, BTS, Dove Cameron and Ariana Grande; the last of whom who he has interviewed on several occasions including during his days on GOOM Radio. Sang's show aims to reach a mostly teen audience and encompasses games and interactive fun interviews with entertainers. Some games he has played with celebrities include "Hillary Clinton or Hilary Duff" when Hilary Duff was on the show, and "F, Marry or Kill" with actresses Maddison Brown and Liz Gillies. Sang looks up to Howard Stern and Elvis Duran for their skills on and off the air.

=== Zach Sang and The Gang/Zach Sang Show (2012–2022) ===
In 2012, Sang launched a terrestrial radio show called "Zach Sang and The Gang" with WYD Media and Westwood One alongside Dan Zolot, Heather "Heff" Connor, and Shelley Rome. It rebranded as the "Zach Sang Show" in March 2016, Shelley Rome left the show for Z100 and was replaced by Jill Gutowitz. The show was heard live every night on over 70 stations in The United States and 13 in Canada, and for its first years was based in the CBS Broadcast Center before moving to the Westwood One studios in Los Angeles. The show, which focused its audience towards 12-34-year olds, aired weekdays from 7pm-midnight, and a 4-hour weekend version of the show featuring a compilation of segments aired in the past week was available at one point. Years later Jill and Heather left, they would eventually be replaced by Ricki Sanchez and Bargain Blaire who would both leave the show in late 2020 and 2021. There were also YouTube and digital placements made of interviews that reach a wider audience. 95SX's Johnny O filled in for Sang for the first two weeks of 2022 before Westwood One ended Sang's show after ten years.

On March 1, 2022, Sang posted a new logo for his show and teased its revival on his Twitter account which was later reposted on the show's Twitter, Facebook, and Instagram accounts. The following week, Sang announced that his show would move to an Amazon-based audio service called Amp and that new celebrity interviews would still be posted on the show's YouTube account, the first of them being 5 Seconds of Summer.

== Personal life ==
Sang is a member of the LGBTQ community, first identifying as queer in 2020. In 2024, he labeled himself as a gay man in a conversation with NLE Choppa in his self-titled podcast.
