= I Hope Ur Miserable Until Ur Dead =

2021 single by Nessa Barrett

- Live from VEVO cover

Single by Nessa Barrett

from the EP Pretty Poison
- Released: August 6, 2021
- Genre: Pop-punk
- Length: 2:58
- Label: Warner
- Songwriters: Nessa Barrett; Evan Blair; Madi Yanofsky; Samuel Mark Catalano; Tim Randolph
- Producer: Blair

Nessa Barrett singles chronology
"Counting Crimes" (2021)	"I Hope Ur Miserable Until Ur Dead" (2021)	"Dying on the Inside" (2022)

Music video
- "I Hope Ur Miserable Until Ur Dead" on YouTube

"I Hope Ur Miserable Until Ur Dead" (stylized in all lowercase) is a song by American musician and social media personality Nessa Barrett released on August 6, 2021, as the lead single from her debut EP Pretty Poison. The song debuted at number 88 on the Billboard Hot 100, becoming her first entry on the chart.

== Commercial performance ==
In the United States, "I Hope Ur Miserable Until Ur Dead" debuted at number 88 on the Billboard Hot 100 and at number 66 on the Rolling Stone Top 100, becoming Barrett's first entry on both charts. Additionally, the song debuted at number 38 in Ireland.

== Music video ==
The song was released alongside a music video directed by Hannah Lux Davis.

== Personnel ==
Credits adapted from Tidal.

- Nessa Barrett – songwriting, vocals
- Evan Blair – production, songwriting, bass, drum programming, electric guitar, recording engineer
- Slush Puppy – acoustic guitar, electric guitar
- Anthony Vilchis – assistant mix engineer
- Chris Galland – assistant mix engineer
- Zach Pereyra – assistant mix engineer
- Tim Randolph – bass, electric guitar, songwriting
- John Greenham – mastering
- Manny Marroquin – mixing
- Jeremie Inhaber – mixing engineer
- Samuel C Harris – recording engineer
- Madi Yanofsky – songwriting
- Samuel Mark Catalano – songwriting

== Charts ==
=== Weekly charts ===
Weekly chart performance for "I Hope Ur Miserable Until Ur Dead"
Chart (2021)	Peak position
Australia (ARIA)	85
Canada (Canadian Hot 100)	53
Global 200 (Billboard)	120
Ireland (IRMA)	38
New Zealand Hot Singles (RMNZ)	5
UK Singles (Official Charts)	75
US Billboard Hot 100	88
US Hot Rock & Alternative Songs (Billboard)	11
US Pop Airplay (Billboard)	33
US Rock & Alternative Airplay (Billboard)	34
US Rolling Stone Top 100	66

=== Year-end charts ===
2021 year-end Chart performance for "I Hope Ur Miserable Until Ur Dead"
Chart (2021)	Position
US Hot Rock & Alternative Songs (Billboard)	52

2022 year-end Chart performance for "I Hope Ur Miserable Until Ur Dead"
Chart (2022)	Position
US Hot Rock & Alternative Songs (Billboard)	99

== Certifications ==
Region	Certification	Certified units/sales
Canada (Music Canada)	Gold	40,000^{‡}
New Zealand (RMNZ)	Gold	15,000^{‡}
United States (RIAA)	Gold	500,000^{‡}
^{‡} Sales+streaming figures based on certification alone.

== Release history ==
Release history for "I Hope Ur Miserable Until Ur Dead"
Country	Date	Format	Label	Ref.
Various	August 6, 2021	Digital download; streaming	Warner	
United States	August 17, 2021	Alternative radio	Warner	
