= Kylee Russell =

American actress

- Occupation: Actress
- Years active: 2005–present
- Notable credit: Eliza in Zombies
- Children: 2
- Relatives: Chelsea Tavares (sister)

Kylee Russell is an American actress known for her role as Eliza in the Zombies film franchise.

== Career ==
Russell portrayed the character of Karin Daniels in the 2007 film Jump In!. She then guest starred in Girl Meets World and Just Jordan. Russell is best known for her role in the Zombies franchise, where she plays Eliza, a zombie and the best friend of Zed (Milo Manheim). The makeup application for the character took approximately three hours each day. Russell did not want to dye her hair and was given a green wig instead. Her character plays a more minor role in Zombies 3, appearing in a robot body, as Eliza is away at a job internship. Russell was pregnant during this role, with remaining scenes being filmed after she recovered from childbirth. Russell used breaks to spend time with her daughter.

In 2020, Russell voiced the symbiote Scorn in the Spider-Man episode "Maximum Venom", with fellow Zombies actresses Meg Donnelly and Carla Jeffery voicing Scorn's sisters Scream and Mania, respectively.

== Personal life ==
Russell often watched Disney Channel as a child. She has two daughters. Russell plays in a band with her sisters Chelsea Tavares and Hallee Russell.

== Filmography ==
=== Film ===
Year	Title	Role	Notes
2007	South of Pico	Roxanne Chambers	
2008	Seven Pounds	Choir Kid	Uncredited role
2009	Mississippi Damned	Young Kari Peterson	
2009	Absolute Evil - Final Exit	Young Savannah Miller	
2015	Where Children Play	Ruby	
2016	Code Red	Andy	Short film
2016	Virtual High	Sophia	Short film
2017	The Sub	Penny Petzinger	Short film
2019	Adventures of Dally & Spanky	Hazel	
2022	Crushed	Hannah	
2023	#TBF	Trinity	

=== Television ===
Year	Title	Role	Notes
2005	Eve	Young Shelly Williams	Episode: "Shelly And?"
2005	ER	Lola	Episode: "Wake Up"
2006	Still Standing	Trudy	Episode: "Still Coaching"
2007	Jump In!	Karin Daniels	Television film
2008	Just Jordan	Hannah	Episode: "Let Sleeping Dogs Lie"
2012	Family Time	Briana	Episode: "There Goes the Neighborhood"
2015	Chasing Life	Mariah	Episode: "As Long as We Both Shall Live"
2016	Girl Meets World	Renee	Episode: "Girl Meets True Maya"
2016	Modern Family	Party Girl #3	Episode: "Halloween 4: The Revenge of Rod Skyhook"
2016	Hank Zipzer's Christmas Catastrophe	Hayden Chase	Television film
2016	Forever Boys	Jaiden	Television film
2018	Zombies	Eliza	Television film
2020	Zombies 2	Eliza	Television film
2020	Girls Room	Minnie	Episode: "Low on Fuel"
2020	Spider-Man	Scorn (voice)	Episode: "Maximum Venom"
2022	Zombies 3	Eliza	Main role
2024	Zombies: The Re-Animated Series	Eliza (voice)	Main role
2025	Zombies 4: Dawn of the Vampires	Eliza	Television film; Main role
