= Zombies (2018 film) =

American musical television film

- Promotional poster
- Genre: Musical; Zombie
- Written by: David Light & Joseph Raso
- Directed by: Paul Hoen
- Starring: Milo Manheim; Meg Donnelly; Trevor Tordjman; Kylee Russell; Carla Jeffery; James Godfrey
- Composer: George S. Clinton
- Country of origin: United States
- Original language: English

Production
- Executive producers: Effie Brown; Paul Hoen
- Producer: Mary Pantelidis
- Cinematography: Robert Drinkmann
- Editor: Lisa Jane Robison
- Running time: 94 minutes
- Production companies: Princessa Productions, LTD

Original release
- Network: Disney Channel
- Release: February 16, 2018

Related
- Zombies 2 (2020); Zombies 3 (2022); Zombies: The Re-Animated Series (2024); Zombies 4: Dawn of the Vampires (2025); Zombies 5: Secrets of the Sea (2027)

Zombies (Note: Sometimes stylized with hyphens as Z-O-M-B-I-E-S.) is a 2018 American teen musical film that premiered on Disney Channel on February 16, 2018 as a Disney Channel Original Movie. The film stars Milo Manheim and Meg Donnelly, playing zombie football player Zed Necrodopolis and human cheerleader Addison Wells who meet and fall in love, and who must lead their respective groups to coexist with each other.

The film takes some concepts, plot elements, and namesakes from an unaired 2011 Disney Channel pilot, titled Zombies & Cheerleaders by David Light and Joseph Raso. Critically, Zombies received mixed reviews with praise directed towards the positive messages and songs but criticism towards the plot's predictability.

Zombies was a success upon its premiere; the movie received just over two and a half million views during its initial February 2018 premiere., the franchise that has spawned from the film resulted in the release of a sequel, Zombies 2, which premiered on Disney Channel on February 14, 2020. A third movie, Zombies 3, premiered on Disney+ on July 15, 2022, before airing on Disney Channel on August 12, 2022. A fourth film, Zombies 4: Dawn of the Vampires, premiered on Disney Channel on July 10, 2025 and July 11, 2025 on Disney+.

== Plot ==
Fifty years ago in the conformist planned community of Seabrook, an accident at the Seabrook Power Plant resulted in an explosion that caused half the population of Seabrook to turn into brain-eating, mindless zombies. Those that weren't affected constructed a wall to quarantine the zombies from the rest of Seabrook in a territory called Zombietown. The government later created bracelets for zombies, called Z-Bands, that deliver electromagnetic pulses to keep zombies from craving brains. In the present day, zombie students from Zombietown transfer to the human high school, Seabrook High, where suburban life is filled with uniformity, traditions, and pep rallies. The zombies in the school are patrolled by Dale, whose daughter Addison and nephew Bucky are on the school's cheerleading team.

Addison begins a relationship with a zombie student named Zed, who is a player on the school's football team due to his Z-Band being hacked by Eliza, one of his zombie friends. Addison and Zed's relationship is initially unknown to all of the students and staff except two of Zed's zombie friends, Eliza and Bonzo. Bucky, who leads the cheerleading team, is jealous of Zed's popularity and makes sure Addison is not able to meet him. Addison is invited by Zed to attend the zombie party in Zombietown. She attends and has a private moment with Zed in the "zombie park". Just before the pair can kiss, however, the Zombie Patrol crashes the party and takes away Addison. At home, Dale and his wife Missy, the mayor of Seabrook, find out that she has a new crush and advise her not to do any cheering until they know who it is, not knowing that the crush is a zombie. The next day, Zed shows up on Addison's doorstep looking human. He and Addison leave her house and go on a date, where he admits he's been messing with his Z-band. Addison tells him that it is the others that have to change, not him.

On the day of the homecoming game, Bucky finds out about Zed's Z-Band hack and has his followers Stacey, Tracey, and Lacey steal Eliza's laptop to hack the Z-Bands. They succeed, resulting in Zed, Eliza, and Bonzo turning into "full zombies" and being taken away by the Zombie Patrol.

Most of the cheerleaders, including Addison and Bree, show their sympathy for the zombies at the game. Addison calls out the crowd for seeing Zed and the other zombies as monsters, which led him to transform into a full zombie to win the game. She then rips off her wig exposing her naturally white hair, which she had hidden due to the residents of Seabrook being against anything different, angering her parents.

Bucky kicks out all of the zombie-supporting cheerleaders following the incident. When the cheerleader competition nears, Addison and Bree find Zed and Bonzo trying to stop Eliza from sabotaging the competition as revenge for Bucky's decision, after Eliza talks with her friends, she realizes that doing so is not the right thing to do. Bucky's team starts to fail because they do not have enough members, so Zoey, Zed's little sister, tries to get in and help him. At first, Zoey is booed by the crowd, but with help from Addison and Zed, the zombies and cheerleaders come together to make a cheer routine during the Cheer competition. Zed and Addison tell each other they love each other in Zombie-Tongue.

The zombies and humans reunite with each other via a block party in Zombietown.

== Cast ==
- Milo Manheim as Zed Necrodopolis, a zombie who wishes to be on the football team.
- Meg Donnelly as Addison Wells, a teenage cheerleader who wears a blonde wig to cover her naturally white hair.
- Trevor Tordjman as Bucky Buchanan, Addison's self-centered cousin who leads the Seabrook High School's cheerleading team.
- Kylee Russell as Eliza Zambi, a zombie who is friends with Zed and is looking to improve zombies’ rights.
- Carla Jeffery as Bree Prattle, an aspiring cheerleader who becomes Addison's friend.
- Kingston Foster as Zoey Necrodopolis, Zed's little sister who wants to have a dog even though zombies are forbidden to have pets.
- James Godfrey as Bonzo, a zombie who is friends with Zed and mostly speaks zombie language that has to be translated by Zed and/or Eliza.
- Naomi Snieckus as Ms. Lee, the principal of Seabrook High School.
- Jonathan Langdon as Coach, the unnamed coach of the Seabrook High School's football team.
- Paul Hopkins as Dale, Addison's father who is the Chief of the Zombie Patrol.
- Marie Ward as Missy, Addison's mother who is the mayor of Seabrook.
- Tony Nappo as Zevon, Zed and Zoey's father.
- Emilia McCarthy as Lacey, a female cheerleader who is friends with Bucky and a member of the Aceys.
- Mickeey Nguyen as Tracey, a male cheerleader who is friends with Bucky and a member of the Aceys.
- Jasmine Renee Thomas as Stacey, a female cheerleader who is friends with Bucky and a member of the Aceys.

== Production ==
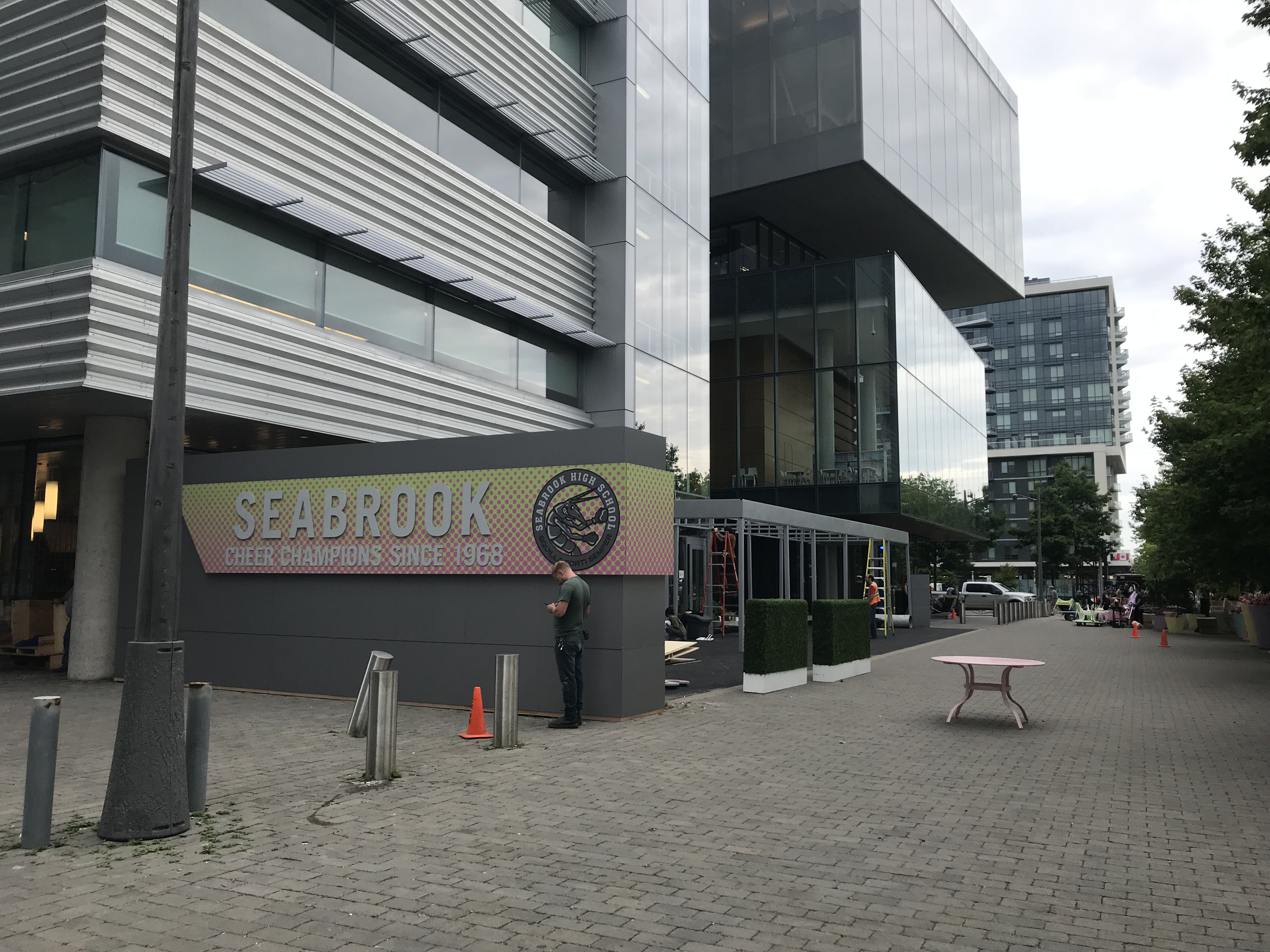
The set of Seabrook High School in Toronto, Ontario

Production on the film began in May 2017. The film was shot in Toronto over 10 weeks.

== Reception ==
=== Critical response ===
Emily Ashby of Common Sense Media rated the movie 3 out of 5 stars, praising the positive message and role models, stating, "There's stereotyping on both sides of the divide for most of the story, as well as some mean-spirited exchanges between humans and zombies, often driven by adults. But the relationship that develops between a human girl (Meg Donnelly) and a zombie boy (Milo Manheim) has a big impact, inspiring their peers to set aside misconceptions and befriend each other. [...] Addison's struggle to let her true self show, and kids will love the catchy soundtrack and dance scenes." Rachel Wagner of Rotoscopers.com rated the movie 4 out of 5 stars, stating, "If you are a fan of the recent Disney Channel musicals then you will definitely love Zombies. It is one of the better entries of late with a sweet message, likable cast and energetic musical numbers." Kyle Burbank of Laughing Place gave the film 3.5 out of 5, writing, "While it may seem strange to single out, perhaps my favorite part of Zombies was the production design. Sticking to a color palette of mostly pinks and greens ranging from neon to pastel might sound nauseating but actually works quite well. [...] With a fresh look, fun characters, and a serviceable soundtrack, this is one DCOM I might actually recommend."

According to Billboard, the soundtrack of the movie placed No. 4 on Billboard's list of top-selling children's music titles.

=== Ratings ===
During its premiere in the 8:00 PM time slot, Zombies attracted a total of 2.57 million viewers with a 0.46 rating for people aged 18–49. Over its premiere weekend, the movie reached nearly 13 million viewers, four million of which were children, over 10 telecasts, and was the number one movie on DisneyNow for over three weeks.

=== Accolades ===
Year	Award	Category	Nominee(s)	Result	Ref.
2019	Canadian Cinema Editors Awards	Best Editing in Family, Television Movie or Series	Lisa Robison	Nominated	
2019	Humanitas Prize	Children's Teleplay	David Light, Joseph Raso	Nominated	

== Sequels ==
In February 2019, it was announced that a Zombies sequel was going into production with returning stars, director, and writers; filming took place in spring 2019. Production began on the sequel in May 2019, with Pearce Joza, Chandler Kinney, and Ariel Martin joining the cast of the film. Zombies 2 premiered on February 14, 2020. A third film, titled Zombies 3, was announced on March 22, 2021, and was filmed in Toronto in spring. In May 2022, it was announced that the film would premiere on July 15, 2022 on Disney+ as an original film of the service, and that its Disney Channel premiere would be on August 12.
