= Paul Hoen =

American film and television director

- Born: Paul B. Hoen; December 28, 1961 (age 64); Los Angeles, California, United States
- Occupations: Film director, producer

Paul B. Hoen (born December 28, 1961) is an American film director and producer. He is best known for his directorial work with Nickelodeon and Disney Channel, especially his direction of Disney Channel Original Movies. He has directed and produced projects such as The Cheetah Girls: One World (2008), Camp Rock 2: The Final Jam (2010), Zombies (2018), Zombies 2 (2020), Zombies 3 (2022) and Zombies 4: Dawn of the Vampires (2025).

== Biography ==
Hoen studied drama, film and television at the University of Santa Clara. He was admitted to the Directors Guild of America (DGA) in 1987. Since then he has directed several television films such as Jump In!, Read It and Weep, Eddie's Million Dollar Cook-Off, You Wish!, Tru Confessions starring Shia LaBeouf and the comedy The Luck of the Irish starring Ryan Merriman. Jump In! broke a viewership record for a Disney Channel premiere.

Hoen won his first DGA awards for the film Jump In in 2007.

He was also nominated for three other DGA awards for the films Camp Rock 2: The Final Jam; "Take My Sister... Please", an episode from the series Even Stevens; and the ABC Family movie Searching for David's Heart. At the 26th Young Artist Awards, Searching for David's Heart was nominated for a Young Artist Award for Best Family Television Movie or Special. The film was also the 2005 recipient of the Humanitas Prize for Children's Live Action Television. You Wish! and Jump In! were also nominated for Humanitas Prizes.

Other series directed by Hoen include Roundhouse, The Secret World of Alex Mack; Sabrina, the Teenage Witch; Cousin Skeeter; The Jersey, for which he is also credited as producer; Just for Kicks; Ned's Declassified School Survival Guide; Just Jordan; Beyond the Break, a series on The N; and South of Nowhere, which was nominated for a GLADD Award for Best Teen Drama. Hoen has also directed two pilot episodes for Nickelodeon, The Journey of Allen Strange and 100 Deeds for Eddie McDowd. He was also a director and an executive producer of the Disney Channel series, Jonas, starring the Jonas Brothers.

In 2011, Hoen was the executive producer and director of the pilot for Madison High, a planned spin-off of the High School Musical francise that was not picked up.

In 2012, he won his second DGA award for the movie Let It Shine featuring Coco Jones and Tyler James Williams. He also directed The Mistle-Tones, an ABC Family Christmas movie starring Tia Mowry and Tori Spelling.

He has also directed the Disney Channel Original Movies Cloud 9 starring Luke Benward and Dove Cameron; How to Build a Better Boy starring China Anne McClain, Kelli Berglund and Invisible Sister starring Rowan Blanchard. He was the main director for Andi Mack, a Disney Channel show about a young girl who discovers her sister is actually her mother.
