= Zombies 2 =

2020 Disney Channel film directed by Paul Hoen

- Based on: Characters created by David Light & Joseph Raso
- Written by: David Light & Joseph Raso
- Directed by: Paul Hoen
- Starring: Milo Manheim; Meg Donnelly
- Composers: George S. Clinton & Amit May Cohen
- Country of origin: United States
- Original language: English

Production
- Executive producers: David Light & Joseph Raso; Paul Hoen; Anna Gerb
- Producer: Mary Pantelidis
- Production location: Toronto, Ontario, Canada
- Cinematography: Rudolf Blahacek
- Editor: Lisa Binkley
- Running time: 84 minutes
- Production company: Bloor Street Productions

Original release
- Network: Disney Channel
- Release: February 14, 2020

Related
- Zombies (2018); Zombies 3 (2022); Zombies: The Re-Animated Series (2024); Zombies 4: Dawn of the Vampires (2025); Zombies 5: Secrets of the Sea (2027)

Zombies 2 (Note: The movie is stylized with hyphens as Z-O-M-B-I-E-S 2 on most Disney websites) is a 2020 American musical comedy werewolf film that premiered on Disney Channel on February 14, 2020 as a Disney Channel Original Movie. A sequel to the 2018 Disney Channel Original Movie Zombies, the film stars Milo Manheim and Meg Donnelly, and features Trevor Tordjman, Kylee Russell, and Carla Jeffery reprising their roles from the first movie, with Chandler Kinney, Pearce Joza, and Baby Ariel joining the cast. The film shows the zombies and cheerleaders, who have mostly since reconciled from the events of the first film, attempting to coexist and assimilate werewolves into the town of Seabrook.

A sequel, Zombies 3, was released in July 2022.

== Plot ==
A flashback sequence details prior events to the founding of Seabrook, where settlers fight off a group of werewolves for control over a supernaturally-charged energy artifact, later known as the moonstone.

In the present, after the events of the first film, the zombies have reunited with and assimilated into the rest of Seabrook. Zed plans to ask Addison to Prawn, the Seabrook equivalent of their high school prom, as she captains a group of new recruits to compete against veteran cheerleaders coached by Bucky. Soon after, Bucky announces his candidacy for class president, and in turn, leaving the seat of cheer captain open; Addison hoping to receive the title.

As the bus carrying the cheerleaders enters the nearby forbidden forest, Addison and her colleagues spot werewolves, which upon report to the local government, causes the mayor to reinstate anti-monster laws. As a result, zombies are banned from Prawn, and in protest of the laws, Zed decides to run for class president to go to Prawn with Addison.

Meanwhile, the local werewolves' power-granting moonstone necklaces are losing their power. Werewolf prophecy states that a girl with white hair known as the Great Alpha will lead them to this moonstone, so the werewolves enroll at Seabrook to contact Addison. Zed attempts to gain their vote for him by offering them advice on how to assimilate into Seabrook, which the werewolves ignore in favor of embracing their werewolf traits.

Noticing Addison's white hair, Wyatt, a high-ranking werewolf, invites her to their den, where they tell her the prophecy and give her a fully charged moonstone necklace, which they have saved for the Great Alpha. If she is truly a werewolf, wearing it will cause her to transform. The werewolves give her one day to decide, and reveal that the imminent demolition of the Seabrook Power Plant will cause the destruction of the moonstone buried underneath the land. The next day, Addison shows Zed the necklace, and out of jealousy, Zed steals it from her. Zed wins his presidential debate against Bucky, but when his Z-Band shorts out due to the moonstone, Zed becomes a full zombie, losing the election.

The werewolves head to Seabrook Power and face off against the demolition crew. The werewolves are arrested at the demolition site, but Addison, alerted by a siren at school, arrives with the cheerleaders and zombies, who get the adults to stop the demolition. After the demolition is postponed, Zed reveals to Addison that he took the necklace from her. Angry, she puts on the necklace, but finds out that she's not a werewolf. The device controlling the demolition shorts out, and Seabrook Power is wrecked despite the town's efforts.

Prawn night arrives and Zed, as well as the rest of the non-humans, show up to crash Prawn. Zed and Addison make up, however, the ground starts shaking and splits open, revealing a blue glow coming from inside the sinkhole. The werewolves realize that the moonstone is not destroyed and enter the concavity to find it. As the humans and zombies follow to help, they find the moonstone, but cannot reach it as a boulder blocks their way. Zed removes his Z-Band and uses his zombie strength to lift the boulder and allow the others to bring the moonstone out safely. After the newfound friends return to Prawn, Zed and Addison share their first kiss.

In the final scene, a glowing blue meteor falls from the moon, waking Addison and causing her hair to glow, though she is oblivious and doesn't notice her strange new power.

== Cast ==
- Milo Manheim as Zed, a zombie
- Meg Donnelly as Addison, a white-haired teen girl
- Trevor Tordjman as Bucky, Addison's self-centered xenophobic cousin who leads the Seabrook High School cheerleading team
- Kylee Russell as Eliza, Zed's zombie friend who fights for equality
- Carla Jeffery as Bree, Addison's cheerleader friend
- Chandler Kinney as Willa, the leader of the Forbidden Forest's werewolf pack & Wyatt's sister
- Pearce Joza as Wyatt, Willa's werewolf brother
- Ariel Martin as Wynter, an over-eager werewolf. She seems mean, but she's actually cute and energetic.
- Kingston Foster as Zoey, Zed's younger sister
- James Godfrey as Bonzo, Zed's zombie friend who mostly speaks zombie language that has to be translated by Zed and/or Eliza
- Naomi Snieckus as Ms. Lee, the principal of Seabrook High School
- Tony Nappo as Zevon, Zed and Zoey's father
- Jasmine Renée Thomas as Stacey, a cheerleader who is friends with Bucky and a member of the Aceys
- Emilia McCarthy as Lacey, a cheerleader who is friends with Bucky and a member of the Aceys
- Noah Zulfikar as Kevin, the latest member of the Aceys
- Paul Hopkins as Dale, Addison's father who's the Chief of the Zombie Patrol
- Marie Ward as Missy, Addison's mom and Seabrook's mayor
- Jonathan Langdon as Coach, the unnamed coach of the Seabrook High School football team, who has now started a froyo side-business

== Production ==
In early 2019, a sequel to Zombies was in production, with returning stars, directors, and writers. Pearce Joza, Chandler Kinney, and Ariel Martin joined the cast with Kylee Russell, Trevor Tordjman, Carla Jeffery, James Godfrey, and Kingston Foster reprising their roles from the first film. The film is written by David Light and Joseph Raso, directed by Paul Hoen, and executive produced by Anna Gerb, Paul Hoen, and Joseph Raso. Production on the film began on May 27, 2019, and wrapped in Toronto on July 15, 2019. Scenes were also shot at Rockwood Conservation Area and the University of Toronto Mississauga. Mary Pantelidis served as producer.

== Release ==
Zombies 2 was released on DVD format on May 19, 2020; the DVD release also featured the music video of "The New Kid In Town" performed by Baby Ariel.

== Reception ==
=== Critical response ===
On the review aggregator website Rotten Tomatoes, 100% of 5 critics' reviews are positive, with an average rating of 7.50/10.

Emily Ashby of Common Sense Media rated the movie four out of five stars, praised the film for the depiction of tolerance and understanding as positive messages, found the characters portrayed by Milo Manheim and Meg Donnelly to be positive role model, and complimented the educational value for the film's approach on social-emotional themes such as body positivity. Rachel Wagner of Rotoscopers gave the film a 3 out of 5 stars rating, praised the performances of the cast and the chemistry between Milo Manheim and Meg Donnelly, while complimenting the musical performances.

=== Ratings ===
During its premiere on February 14, 2020, in the 8:00 PM time slot, Zombies 2 attracted a total of 2.46 million viewers, with a 0.52 rating for people aged 18–49. The sequel performed better than the original among young adults between 18 and 49 years old.

=== Accolades ===
Year	Award	Category	Nominee(s)	Result	Ref.
2021	Canadian Cinema Editors Awards	Best Editing in Television Movie or Mini-Series	Lisa Binkley	Nominated	
2021	Leo Awards	Best Picture Editing in a Television Movie	Lisa Binkley	Nominated	
2021	Canadian Alliance for Film and Television Costume Arts and Design Awards	Best Costume Design in Film Sci-Fi/Fantasy	Zombies 2	Won	

== Sequel ==
A third film, Zombies 3, was announced on March 22, 2021. Filming took place in Toronto, beginning on May 31, 2021. The film premiered on Disney+ on July 15, 2022, and was followed by an extended version premiering on Disney Channel on August 12, 2022. The third film involves an alien invasion. On May 20, 2022, RuPaul was announced to have joined the cast as the voice of "The Mothership", described in the official synopsis as "a comedically passive-aggressive UFO".
