= Emilia McCarthy =

Canadian actress, dancer and writer

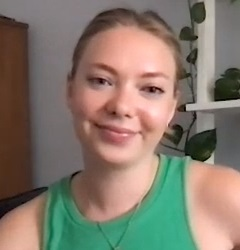
- McCarthy in 2022
- Born: August 28, 1997 (age 29); London, Ontario, Canada
- Occupations: Actress; dancer; writer
- Years active: 2006–present
- Known for: Zombies; Zapped; Max & Shred

Emilia McCarthy (born August 28, 1997) is a Canadian actress, dancer and writer. She plays the role of Abby Ackerman on Max & Shred, her first main role in a television series. It is produced by YTV and also aired on Nickelodeon. She played one of Sheriff Sworn's twin daughters, Alyssa Sworn, in the Netflix television series Hemlock Grove. McCarthy also played Taylor Dean in the Disney Channel Original Movie Zapped. In 2018, she portrayed the role of Lacey in the Disney Channel Original Movie Zombies and reprised the role in Zombies 2 and Zombies 3.

In July 2013, she began working on the film Maps to the Stars playing Kayla. The film premiered on April 14, 2014, at various festivals and generated positive reviews.

== Early life ==
McCarthy was born on August 28, 1997, in London, Ontario, where she was raised. She is the daughter of Margarita De Antuñano, Director of the Canada-Mexico Cultural Exchange Centre and a Spanish teacher and Barry McCarthy a retired Vice-principal. McCarthy has Mexican and Irish ancestry; her mother is Mexican Canadian and father of Irish origin.

McCarthy took acting classes at Armstrong Acting Studios, in Toronto. She stated in a 2013 interview that:

"I was about seven and literally woke up one day and said, Mom, Dad, I want to be an actress".

Then in 2006 she landed her first role as Elle Fanning's photo double in the film Babel starring Brad Pitt and Cate Blanchett. The movie was directed by Oscar winner, Alejandro Gonzalez Iñarritu.

== Career ==
=== 2007–2012: Early career ===
At eight years-old, McCarthy had the opportunity to perform with Cate Blanchett and Gael García Bernal as daughter Cate—a role she shared with Elle Fanning—in the Golden Globe-winning film Babel.

In 2007, at the age of nine, McCarthy landed the role of Laura Westover for the TV movie Booky & the Secret Santa. In 2009, at age 11, she was hired again to resume the role of Laura Westover in the movie Booky's Crush being the last film in the series.

McCarthy made a special appearance in the episode "All In" on the CW-Ranked Beauty & the Beast as Cena. The episode was released on October 25, 2012.

McCarthy has performed in several theatre productions like Hairspray and Tarantella Cabaret, also made stage appearances in works such as Aida and Seussical Jr.

=== 2013–present: Movies and Max & Shred ===
McCarthy auditioned in Toronto for Eli Roth, director / producer of the series. In April, Netflix premiered the series Hemlock Grove of 13 episodes. Emilia appeared in 9 episodes as Alyssa Sworn in the series.

McCarthy was the star of the web series Unlikely Heroes and Kid's Town in 2013. That same year McCarthy landed the female lead role in the film Bunks, a film original Disney XD. Where Lauren plays a camp counselor who wants the rules followed by the campers.

McCarthy was part of the main cast of the film Zapped, she plays Taylor Dean, the antagonist of Zendaya's character. The film premiered on June 27, 2014, in the United States and United Kingdom and America premiered on August 10, 2014.

The July 15, 2013, it was confirmed that McCarthy would be part of the cast of the film Maps to the Stars. She played the character of Kayla. Production began in July 2013. EOne introduced the film with his other films in state post-production in 2013 at the Toronto Film Festival. On April 14, 2014, the first preview of the film that was released. The film premiered at the 2014 Cannes Film Festival and the performances of the cast were praised.

McCarthy plays the role of Abby Ackerman in the new YTV series Max & Shred, which also will be transmitted by Nickelodeon. The series had a release date of October 6, 2014, in the United States.

== Personal life ==
In 2014, McCarthy graduated from Westdale Secondary School. In 2015, she began attending Ryerson University (now Toronto Metropolitan University) in parallel with her acting career, majoring in film studies and minoring in psychology.

== Filmography ==
=== Film ===
Year	Title	Role	Notes
2014	Maps to the Stars	Kayla	
2016	Jane	N/A	Cinematographer and editor
2016	Wilt	N/A	Director
2016	Sadie's Last Days on Earth	Robin	
2017	Love Coinky Dink	Sharon Phelp	Short film
2019	Dance Together	Tia	
2020	Retrograde	N/A	Producer
2021	Honey!	Melissa	Short film
2021	Kaira	N/A	Producer
2022	Zombies 3	Lacey	
2023	Founders Day	Lilly Gladwell	

=== Television ===
Year	Title	Role	Notes
2007	Booky and the Secret Santa	Laura Westover	Television film
2009	Booky's Crush	Laura Westover	Television film
2012	Beauty and the Beast	Cena	Episode: "All In"
2013–2016	Wild Kratts	Yi / Nina / Patricia	3 episodes
2013	Hemlock Grove	Alyssa Sworn	Recurring role, 9 episodes
2013	Bunks	Lauren	Television film
2014	Zapped	Taylor Dean	Television film
2014–2016	Max & Shred	Abby Ackerman	Main role
2017	Dark Haven High	N/A	Main role
2018	Zombies	Lacey	Television film
2018	Let's Go Luna!	Silvia (voice)	Episode: "The Big Dig/Amazing Man"
2020	October Faction	Heather	Recurring role
2020	Zombies 2	Lacey	Television film
2022–2025	SkyMed	Madison Van Camp	Main role

=== Web ===
Year	Title	Role	Notes
2013	Kid's Town	Beth Pilly	Main role
2013	Unlikely Heroes	Cheryllyn	Main role

== Bibliography ==
- Baby's Wish (2006)

== Awards and nominations ==
Year	Award	Work	Category	Result	Ref.
2015	Young Artist Award	Zapped	Best Performance in a TV Movie, Miniseries, Special or Pilot - Young Actress	Won	
2015	Young Artist Award	Max & Shred	Best Performance in a TV Series - Leading Young Actress	Nominated	
2015	The Joey Awards	Max & Shred	Best Actress in a TV Comedy or Action Leading Role Age 16-21	Nominated	
2015	The Joey Awards	Max & Shred	Best Young Ensemble in a TV Series (shared with Jonny Gray, Saara Chaudry and Jake Goodman)	Nominated	
2016	Young Artist Award	Max & Shred	Best Performance In a TV Series Leading Young Actress (14 – 21)	Nominated	
2016	The Joey Awards	Max & Shred	Best Young Actress in a Comedy TV Series Leading Role 16-21 Years	Won	
2017	Young Artist Award	Max & Shred	Best Performance In a TV Series Leading Teen Actress	Nominated	

== See also ==
- Hemlock Grove
