= Bixler High Private Eye =

2019 television film by Leslie Kolins Small

- Genre: Action; Comedy
- Written by: Christopher Baldi; Danny Kallis; Michele J. Wolff
- Directed by: Leslie Kolins Small
- Starring: Jace Norman; Ariel Martin; Ed Begley Jr.; Samiyah Womack; David Clayton Rogers
- Music by: Michael Sempert
- Country of origin: United States
- Original language: English

Production
- Producers: Tobin Armbrust; Jace Norman; Michael Sammaciccia
- Cinematography: Robert Brinkmann
- Editor: Anita Brandt-Burgoyne
- Running time: 66 minutes (Exc. Adverts); 90 minutes (Inc. Adverts)
- Production companies: GHS Productions; Nickelodeon Productions; Virgin Produced

Original release
- Network: Nickelodeon
- Release: January 21, 2019

Bixler High Private Eye is an American comedy television film that aired on January 21, 2019. The film stars Jace Norman, Baby Ariel, Samiyah Womack and Ed Begley Jr. and was directed by Leslie Kolins Small.

== Plot ==
Xander DeWitt (Jace Norman) is an inquisitive teenager with a knack for solving mysteries. His sleuthing skills get put to the test when his dad Russell (Rick Peters) leaves for work one day and vanishes without a trace. Frustrated by his attempts to find his dad – with the latest one getting him in trouble with the police – Xander's mom Ellen (Terryn Westbrook) sends him to go live with his grandfather Charlie (Ed Begley Jr.), a retired private investigator in his dad's hometown, Bixler Valley. During his stay, Xander finds a surprising lead in the case and teams up with a school newspaper reporter and classmate, Kenzie Messina (Ariel Martin).

With the help of Kenzie and his grandpa, Xander eventually finds his dad who was kidnapped by an old friend in order to raze the town.

== Cast ==
- Jace Norman as Xander Dewitt
- Ariel Martin as Kenzie Messina
- David Rogers as Jack Finn
- Samiyah Womack as Cara Jean
- Ed Begley Jr. as Charlie Dewitt
- Mike C. Nelson as Sheriff Mundy
- Terryn Westbrook as Ellen Dewitt
- Rick Peters as Russell Dewitt
  - Matt Mitchell as young Russel Dewitt

== Reception ==
Bixler High Private Eye was positively reviewed by Kidsday reporters for Newsday.com, which gave it a "5 out of 5 smile rating."
