= Naomi Snieckus =

Canadian actress

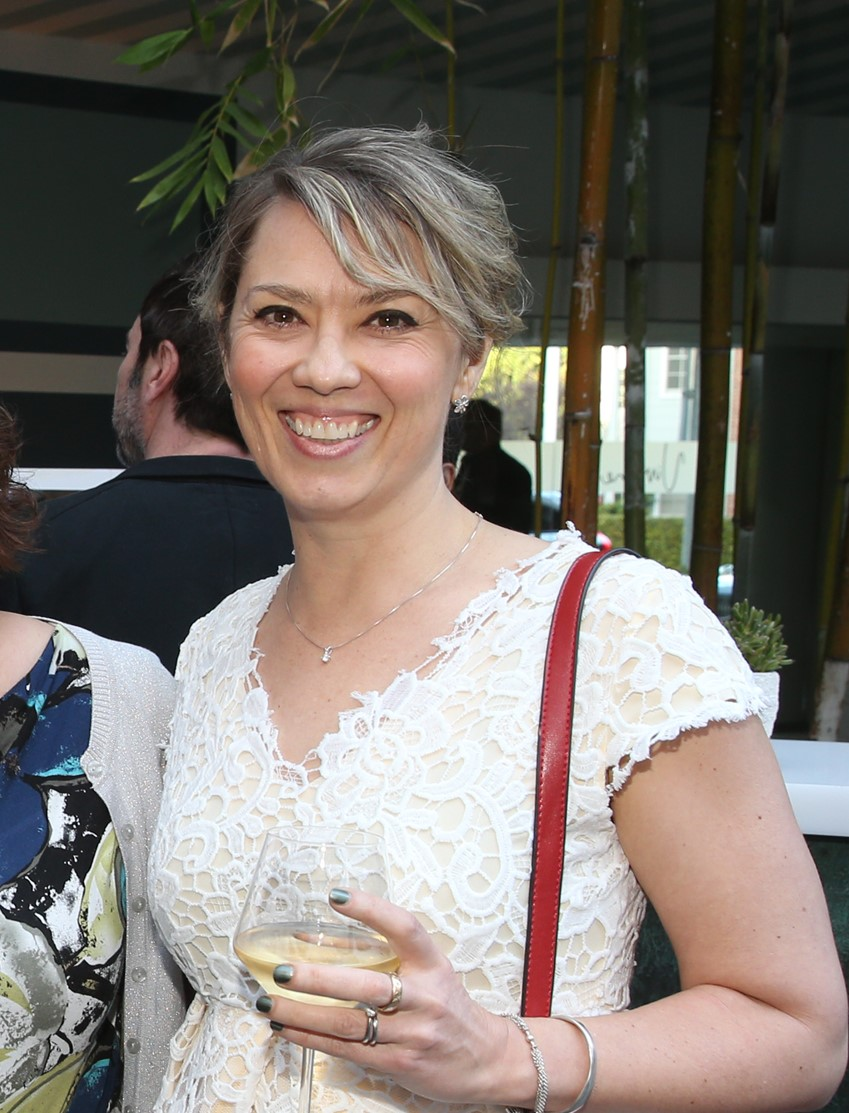
- Snieckus in 2017
- Born: February 24, 1974 (age 52); Toronto, Ontario, Canada
- Occupation: Actress
- Known for: Mr. D Saw 3D; Zombies franchise

Naomi Snieckus (born February 24, 1974) is a Canadian actress, best known for her regular television role as Bobbi in Mr. D and her appearance as Nina in Saw 3D. She is also a podcast host.

== Career ==
An alumna of the Second City's Toronto company, she later formed the improvisational comedy troupes National Theatre of the World with Ron Pederson and Matt Baram, and Impromptu Splendor with Pederson, Baram and Kayla Lorette. She also acted extensively in guest appearances on television series, as well as extensive work in commercials, until her roles in Saw 3D and Mr. D.

From 2011 to 2014 she co-produced a webseries called The Casting Room.

In 2014, she appeared as a lead character in the film Two 4 One. In 2015, she and Baram, to whom she is now married, created an improv duo show called Baram & Snieckus: You & Me.

Snieckus is also the host of a podcast entitled Firecracker Department, in which she interviews female and non-binary artists, working across a variety of media. Subsequently, an international online community has been developed, which she also leads, in which members empower each other to take creative action through education and positive support.

== Filmography ==
=== Film ===
Year	Title	Role	Notes
1994	1994	Weather Girl	
2010	Saw 3D	Nina	
2012	The Samaritan	Waitress	Uncredited
2012	Cold Blooded	Dispatcher	Voice
2012	The Barrens	Monica	
2014	Two 4 One	Miriam	
2015	The Steps	Ellen	
2017	Kiss and Cry	Sophie Wexner	
2017	Love of My Life	Lorna	
2019	Canadian Strain	Judy	
2020	Work It	Maria Ackerman	

=== Television ===
Year	Title	Role	Notes
2001	The Immortal	Thelma	Episode: "The Asylum"
2002	The Dead Zone	Melanie Romano	Episode: "The Siege"
2003	Train 48	Victoria	Episode: "1.13"
2005	ReGenesis	Angela Webb	Episode: "The Source"
2006	Cradle of Lies	Betty	Television film
2006	The Road to Christmas	Rose	Television film
2007	Love You to Death	Nurse	Episode: "The Clown Case"
2007–2009	Da Kink in My Hair	—N/a	2 episodes
2008	Degrassi: The Next Generation	Store Manager	Episode: "Got My Mind Set On You"
2008	The Border	Receptionist	Episode: "Got My Mind Set On You"
2009	The Jon Dore Television Show	Woman	Episode: "Jon Fights Violence"
2009	Being Erica	Vair	Episode: "What Goes Up Must Come Down"
2009–2010	The Ron James Show	—N/a	6 episodes
2010	Little Mosque on the Prairie	Dance Teacher	Episode: "A Lease Too Far"
2010	Lost Girl	Talent Agent	Episode: "Fae Day"
2010	The Dating Guy	Amanda (voice)	Episode: "Weekend at Booyah's"
2010–2013	Wingin' It	Mildred Stern	7 episodes
2011	Skins	Mary	Episode: "Chris"
2016	The Swap	Coach Carol	Television film
2018	Zombies	Principal Lee	Television film
2020	Zombies 2	Principal Lee	Television film
2020	Locked in Love	Andrea	Episode: "Chapter One"
2020	Ollie's Pack	June	recurring role
2021	Day Players	Casting Associate	Episode: "Audition Preparation"
2022	Zombies 3	Principal Lee	Television film
2024	Zombies: The Re-Animated Series	Principal Lee (voice)	Recurring cast
2024	My Dead Mom	Ryan	
2025	The Handmaid's Tale	Abigail	Episode: "Exile"

== Awards ==
Year	Title	Result
2010	Canadian Comedy Award for Best Female Improviser	Won
2012	Canadian Comedy Award for Best Performance by a Female – Television	Nominated
2012	Canadian Comedy Award for Best Web Series	Won
2013	Canadian Comedy Award for Best Performance by a Female – Television	Won
2013	ACTRA Award for Outstanding Performance – Female	Nominated
2015	ACTRA Award for Best Performance by an Actress in a Featured Supporting Role or Guest Role in a Comedic Series	Nominated
2016	ACTRA Award for Best Performance by an Actress in a Featured Supporting Role or Guest Role in a Comedic Series	Nominated
2017	ACTRA Award for Best Performance by an Actress in a Featured Supporting Role or Guest Role in a Comedic Series	Nominated
2018	ACTRA Award for Best Performance by an Actress in a Featured Supporting Role or Guest Role in a Comedic Series	Nominated
