= Meg Donnelly =

American actress (born 2000)

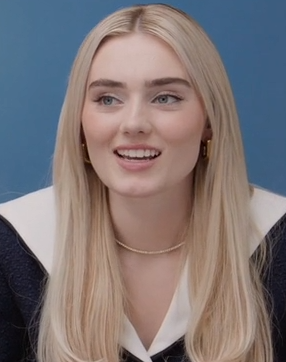
- Donnelly in 2025
- Born: Meg Elizabeth Donnelly; July 25, 2000 (age 26); New York City, New York, U.S.
- Occupations: Actress; singer; dancer
- Years active: 2013–present
- Website: megdonnelly.com

Meg Elizabeth Donnelly (born July 25, 2000) is an American actress and singer. She played Taylor Otto in the ABC sitcom American Housewife (2016–2021), Addison Wells in the Disney Channel film series Zombies (2018–2025), and Mary Campbell in the CW television series The Winchesters (2022–2023).

== Early life ==
Donnelly was born in New York City and grew up in Peapack-Gladstone, New Jersey. She is an only child. She began training in voice, dance and acting at the Annie's Playhouse School of Performing Arts in Far Hills, New Jersey at the age of six. She has appeared as a featured vocalist in several Kids of the Arts, Broadway Kids and Time To Shine productions in New York City. While in New York, to better communicate with Japanese exchange students at her high school, she began learning their language, later releasing one of her singles in Japanese.

== Career ==
Donnelly co-starred as Ash in the 2013 Netflix series Team Toon. She was the American face of Clean and Clear's 2015 Awkward to Awesome campaign, and was the understudy for the role of Louisa von Trapp in the NBC television special The Sound of Music Live!. She starred in the 2015 Nickelodeon pilot Future Shock, but it was not sold.

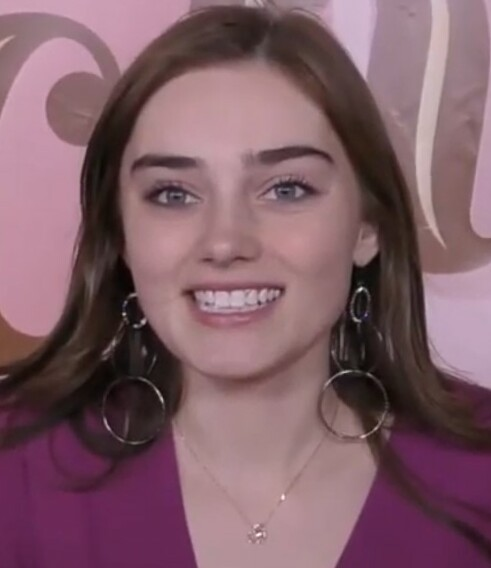
Donnelly in 2016

Donnelly played the starring role of Taylor Otto in the ABC sitcom American Housewife from 2016 to 2021. She replaced actress Johnny Sequoyah who played the character in the series' pilot. Critics cited this as Donnelly's breakout role. She then appeared in the independent film The Broken Ones, which premiered at the 2017 SOHO International Film Festival.

Donnelly stars as Addison in the Disney Channel Original Movie musical Zombies, which premiered on February 16, 2018. She then released her debut single, "Smile", on August 5, 2018. On March 1, 2019, she released her second single, "Digital Love". She reprised the role of Addison in the sequels Zombies 2, which premiered on Disney Channel on February 14, 2020; Zombies 3, which was released in July and August 2022 on Disney+ and Disney Channel, respectively; and Zombies 4: Dawn of the Vampires, which premiered on Disney Channel in July 2025.

In 2022, Donnelly was cast as Mary Campbell, the future mother of Dean and Sam Winchester, in the Supernatural spin-off The Winchesters, which was picked up to series by The CW in May and cancelled after one season. Also in 2022, she played the recurring role of Val in the Disney+ original series High School Musical: The Musical: The Series.

In 2023, she voiced Kara Zor-El / Supergirl in the film Legion of Super-Heroes, a role she reprised the following year in the Justice League: Crisis on Infinite Earths trilogy. Donnelly subsequently was among the finalists to play Supergirl in the live action film Supergirl, though the part was ultimately given to Milly Alcock.

In 2025, Donnelly competed in season thirteen of The Masked Singer as "Coral". She finished in 3rd place. At age 24, she was the youngest finalist in the show. Following her appearance on the series, she announced the release of an extended play, Dying Art. It was released on June 20, 2025.

She made her Broadway debut as Satine in Moulin Rouge! The Musical which ran from November 11, 2025 to March 1, 2026.

== Personal life ==
On February 24, 2024, Donnelly confirmed she was in a relationship with American actor and The Winchesters co-star, Drake Rodger.

== Filmography ==
=== Film ===
Year	Title	Role	Notes
2017	The Broken Ones	Lilly Kelly	Independent film
2023	Legion of Super-Heroes	Kara Zor-El / Supergirl	Voice role
2024	Justice League: Crisis on Infinite Earths	Kara Zor-El / Supergirl	Voice role

=== Television ===
Year	Title	Role	Notes
2013	Celebrity Ghost Stories	Young Jacklyn	1 episode
2013	Team Toon	Ash	Main role
2015	Future Shock	Annie	Unsold pilot
2015–2016	What Would You Do?	Various	3 episodes
2016–2021	American Housewife	Taylor Otto	Main role
2018	Zombies	Addison Wells	Television film
2020	Zombies 2	Addison Wells	Television film
2020	Spider-Man	Scream	Voice role; episode: "Maximum Venom"
2020–2021	Zombies: Addison's Monster Mystery	Addison Wells	Voice role
2021	Bunk'd	Priscilla Preston	Episode: "Frien'ds Forever"
2022	Zombies 3	Addison Wells	Television film; also co-producer
2022	High School Musical: The Musical: The Series	Val	Recurring role
2022–2023	The Winchesters	Mary Campbell	Main role
2023–2024	Zombies: The Re-Animated Series	Addison Wells	Voice role
2025	Chibiverse	Addison Wells	Voice role; episode: "Cheer Up Chibis"
2025	The Masked Singer	Herself/Coral	Season 13 Contestant
2025	Zombies 4: Dawn of the Vampires	Addison Wells	Television film; also executive producer

=== Theater ===
Year	Production	Role	Venue
2025–2026	Moulin Rouge! The Musical	Satine	Al Hirschfeld Theatre
