= Milo Manheim =

American actor (born 2001)

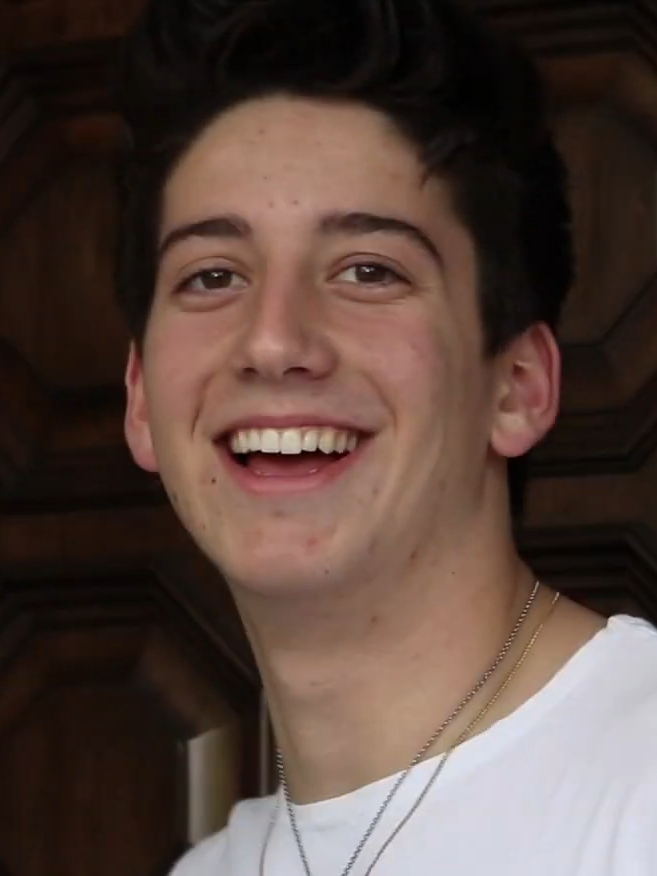
- Manheim in 2019
- Born: Milo Jacob Manheim; March 6, 2001 (age 25); Venice, California, U.S.
- Occupation: Actor
- Years active: 2007–present
- Mother: Camryn Manheim
- Website: milomanheim.com

Milo Jacob Manheim (born March 6, 2001) is an American actor. He is best known for his starring role as Zed in the Disney Channel film franchise Zombies and as Joseph in the 2023 Christmas musical, Journey to Bethlehem. In 2018, he finished in second place on season 27 of Dancing with the Stars. Manheim currently stars in the Paramount+ original School Spirits. Manheim was announced to be playing Flynn Rider in Walt Disney Pictures' upcoming live-action adaptation of Tangled, joining Teagan Croft in the lead cast.

== Early life ==
Manheim was born and raised in Venice, Los Angeles, in California. He is the son of actress Camryn Manheim and former model Jeffrey Brezovar.

== Career ==
Manheim's acting career began at a local after-school program in Culver City. Since 2008, he starred in 20 different musicals with Liza Monjauze Productions. In 2017, he won "Outstanding Performance in a Leading Role" at the 2017 New York Musical Theatre Festival for his role in the musical "Generation Me".

Manheim followed this up by being cast in a lead role in the Disney Channel television movie Zombies, which premiered on February 16, 2018. Manheim reprised his role as Zed in the sequel films, Zombies 2, which premiered on February 14, 2020, Zombies 3, which was released on Disney+ on July 15, 2022 and Zombies 4: Dawn of the Vampires , which was released on Disney+ on July 10, 2025.

On September 11, 2018, Manheim was announced as one of the celebrities to compete on season 27 of Dancing with the Stars. He was paired with professional dancer Witney Carson. On November 19, 2018, Manheim and Carson finished the competition in second place, losing to radio personality Bobby Bones.

In August 2022, Manheim was cast in a lead role, opposite Peyton List, in a Paramount+ series called School Spirits.

In February 2025, Manheim began starring as Seymour in the off-Broadway revival of Little Shop of Horrors. In January 2026, Manheim was cast as Flynn Rider in a live-action film adaptation of Tangled.

== Personal life ==
Manheim is Jewish. He explored a topic he called "Activism at Any Age" during his bar mitzvah studies with the Sholem Community, a nontheist, secular Jewish organization in Los Angeles, California. Manheim plays guitar, drums, piano, and ukulele, as well as various wind instruments.

== Filmography ==
=== Film ===
Year	Title	Role	Notes
2023	Journey to Bethlehem	Joseph	
2023	Thanksgiving	Ryan	
2028	Tangled	Flynn Rider	Filming

=== Television ===
Year	Title	Role	Notes
2009	Ghost Whisperer	Riley	Episode: "Dead Listing"
2017	Disney Parks Magical Christmas Celebration	Himself	Television special
2018	Zombies	Zed	Television film
2018	Dancing with the Stars	Himself	Contestant (season 27)
2018–2019	American Housewife	Pierce	4 episodes
2019	Hell's Kitchen	Himself	Uncredited guest diner; Episode: "Poor Trev"
2019	Celebrity Family Feud	Himself	1 episode
2020	Zombies 2	Zed	Television film
2021	The Conners	Josh	3 episodes
2022	Zombies 3	Zed	Television film; also co-producer
2023–present	School Spirits	Wally	Main role; 16 episodes
2023	Prom Pact	Ben Plunkett	Television film
2023	Doogie Kameāloha, M.D.	Nico	Recurring role; 6 episodes
2024	Zombies: The Re-Animated Series	Zed (voice)	Main cast
2025	Zombies 4: Dawn of the Vampires	Zed	Television film; also executive producer
2025	Platonic	Mason Grand, playing Young Darcy	Season 2, episode 8
2026	Camp Rock 3	Calvin Rhodes	Television film

=== Theatre ===
Year	Title	Role	Notes
2017	Generation Me	Milo Reynolds	Off-Broadway
2024	American Idiot	Voice of Johnny	Mark Taper Forum; Deaf production
2025	Little Shop of Horrors	Seymour Krelborn	Off-Broadway
2025	Jesus Christ Superstar	Peter	Hollywood Bowl

=== Music videos ===
Year	Title	Artist	Notes
2023	"Feather"	Sabrina Carpenter	
2026	"Homewrecker"	sombr	

== Awards and nominations ==
Year	Award	Category	Nominated work	Result	Ref.
2017	New York Musical Theatre Festival	Outstanding Performance in a Leading Role	Generation Me	Won	
