= Kingston Foster =

American actress (born 2010)

- Born: Kingston Muse Foster; July 26, 2010 (age 16)
- Occupation: Actress
- Years active: 2016–present

Kingston Muse Foster (born July 26, 2010) is an American actress. Her first acting role was in Criminal Minds: Beyond Borders (2016) as Abby Wagner. She also had roles in Fuller House (2016), Bitch (2017), Days of our lives (2016-2019) and Good Girls (2018). She also portrayed Zoey in Zombies (2018), Zombies 2 (2020), Zombies 3 (2022), and Zombies: The Re-Animated Series (2024–2026).

== Career ==
Foster began acting at the age of 5 in Criminal Minds: Beyond Borders (2016) as Abby Wagner. Later, she appeared in Fuller House (2016) as Joan Gladstone and in Days of our lives (2016-2019) as Heather. In 2019, Foster returned to the series as Arianna Horton, with which was nominated to best young actress in a daytime series from the Young Entertainer Awards in 2020.

Her first onscreen role was in Bitch (2017) as Cindy Hart. Foster made her acting debut in Zombies (2018) as Zoey. She reprised the role in the sequels, Zombies 2 (2020) and Zombies 3 (2022). Foster also voiced Zoey on the animated series, Zombies: The Re-Animated Series (2024–2026).

Foster appeared in Emerson Heights (2020) as Emerson. In 2023, Foster played Edda in Rebel Moon - Part One: A Child of Fire. She reprised the role in the sequel Rebel Moon – Part Two: The Scargiver (2024).

== Filmography ==
=== Film ===
Year	Title	Role	Notes
2017	Bitch	Cindy Hart	
2018	Zombies	Zoey	Television film
2020	Zombies 2	Zoey	Television film
2020	Emerson Heights	Emerson	
2022	Zombies 3	Zoey	Television film
2023	Rebel Moon - Part One: A Child of Fire	Edda	
2024	Rebel Moon – Part Two: The Scargiver	Edda	

=== Television ===
Year	Title	Role	Notes
2016	Criminal Minds: Beyond Borders	Abby Wagner	Episode: "Paper Orphans"
2016–2017	Fuller House	Joan Gladstone	2 episodes
2016–2019	Days of our lives	Heather	2 episodes
2016–2019	Days of our lives	Arianna Horton	2 episodes
2017	Great News	Young Katherine "Katie" Wendelson	4 episodes
2018	Good Girls	Emma Boland	Episode: "Pilot"
2018	American Horror Story	Angelic Girl	Episode: "Sojourn"
2018	Shortcomings	Willow Davis	Episode: "Pilot Pitch Presentation"
2019	Fresh Off the Boat	Powerpuff Girl #1	Episode: "Hal-Lou-Ween"
2019–2020	Just Roll with It	Tex	3 episodes
2024–2026	Zombies: The Re-Animated Series	Zoey (voice)	6 episodes

== Nominations ==
Year	Award	Category	Work	Result	Ref.
2020	Young Entertainer Awards	Best Young Actress - Daytime series	Days of our lives	Nominated	
