= Two 4 One =

- Film poster
- Directed by: Mo Bradley
- Written by: Mo Bradley
- Produced by: Daniel Hogg; Mo Bradley; Glen Wood
- Starring: Gavin Crawford; Naomi Snieckus; Gabrielle Rose; Andrea Menard
- Cinematography: Amy Belling
- Music by: David Parfit; Marc Junker
- Release date: 21 September 2014 (CIFF)
- Running time: 77 minutes
- Country: Canada
- Language: English

Two 4 One is a 2014 Canadian comedy-drama film that marks the debut of Victoria, British Columbia filmmaker Maureen Bradley. The film stars Gavin Crawford as Adam, a trans man who agrees to have a one-night stand with his ex-girlfriend Miriam (Naomi Snieckus) during which he uses a mail order at-home pregnancy kit to artificially inseminate her with donated sperm. However, an accident during the encounter leaves both Adam and Miriam pregnant, forcing Adam, who has not yet completed the surgical phase of his gender transition, to confront the ways in which the pregnancy will influence his sense of gender identity.

After premiering on September 21, 2014 at the Calgary International Film Festival., the film gained traction among the LGBT community and extended its screenings to queer and LGBT film festivals across North America and the UK. It received multiple nominations for the 2015 Leo Awards and won three best film awards that same year.

== Cast ==
- Gavin Crawford as Adam/Melanie
- Naomi Snieckus as Miriam
- Gabrielle Rose as Franny, Adam's mother
- Andrea Menard as Julia
- Matt Baram as Brian
- Chris Mackie as Fitch
- Matt Hamilton as Duncan
- Dean Wray as Sylvain
- Demelza Randall as Sarah
- Christine Willes as Dr. Sharp
- Karen Brelsford as Dr. Beck

== Production ==
=== Development ===
Two 4 One is loosely inspired by the real-life pregnancy of Thomas Beatie, a trans man who gave birth to three children between 2008-2010 in place of his infertile wife. After undergoing sex reassignment surgery on his chest region, but keeping his internal reproductive organs intact, Beatie and his wife used artificial insemination and donated sperm to impregnate Beatie in 2007. Bradley used Beatie's pregnancy as a scientific basis from which to build the fictional plot of Two 4 One, adding in the element of an accidental pregnancy to contrast the film's theme of sexual identity.

=== Filming ===
Financial backing for the film was contributed by Telefilm Canada, National Screen Institute, and the BC Arts Council, as well as a crowdfunding campaign on Indiegogo. Due to a limited budget and 15-day filming window, Bradley's choice to film in her hometown was both inevitable and serendipitous, with Victoria's coastal backdrop being a key feature to the film's theme of existential questioning.

== Reception ==
=== Critical response ===
The film received mixed reviews, with some praising Bradley for creating an honest and dynamic portray of the struggles faced by the transgender community, and others criticising her use of humor as a vehicle for discussing serious transgender issues.

Writing for the National Post, Rebecca Tucker states that by placing the focus of the film on Adam and Miriam's love story, rather than Adam's sexual reassignment surgery, is "what makes the film work ... The habit [of film] to focus specifically on transition –on treating the bodies’ of trans people as physical curiosities open for discussion –is wickedly dehumanizing." Bradley’s highlighting of a transgender character within "the greater context of humane experience, not just trans experience, is important particularly as a means of garnering greater acceptance, understanding, and tolerance: simply put, it communicates rather bluntly that trans people are people, too." Brad Wheeler of The Globe and Mail also gave the film a three out of four stars rating, stating that while "the acting is uniformly unforced and the tone is gentle throughout the turns" there is fault in how the "highly awkward situations are resolved with an efficiency that is more wishful thinking than reality."

Susan G. Cole, a feminist writer for NOW Magazine, describes the film as having issues with tone, stating: "this is supposed to be a comedy, but the struggles of transgendered people are very real and not funny. And writer/director Bradley gives us an easy ending that makes it look like transphobia doesn’t exist."

=== Accolades ===
At the 2015 Leo Awards, Two 4 One received 5 nominations, including: Best Motion Picture, Best Director (for Bradley), Best Screenplay (for Bradley), Best Casting, and Best Costume Design. At the 2015 Available Light Film Festival, Victoria Film Festival, and Vancouver International Film Festival, the film won Best Feature/Canadian Fiction Film. Additional awards include Outstanding Performance, Male Category, for Gavin Crawford at the ACTRA Toronto Awards, and a nomination for Best Emerging BC Filmmaker for Maureen Bradely at the Vancouver International Film Festival.

The film gained international recognition through screenings across North America and the UK, garnering award nominations and wins at: Pittsburgh LGBT Film Festival (Audience Award for Best Comedy), Chicago International LGBTQ+ Film Festival (Special Jury Prize), and Translations: The Seattle Transgender Film Festival (Audience Award for Best Feature Film).

== See also ==
- List of LGBT films directed by women
