= Zombies 3 =

2022 musical television film

- Official Disney+ release poster
- Based on: Characters created by David Light & Joseph Raso
- Written by: David Light and Joseph Raso
- Directed by: Paul Hoen
- Starring: Meg Donnelly; Milo Manheim; Trevor Tordjman; Kylee Russell; Carla Jeffery; Chandler Kinney; Pearce Joza; Ariel Martin; Terry Hu; Matt Cornett; Kyra Tantao; Kingston Foster; James Godfrey; RuPaul
- Composers: George S. Clinton and Amit May Cohen
- Country of origin: United States
- Original language: English

Production
- Executive producers: David Light; Joseph Raso; Paul Hoen; Suzanne Farwell
- Producer: Mary Pantelidis
- Production location: Toronto, Ontario, Canada
- Cinematography: Christian Herrera
- Editor: Lisa Binkley
- Running time: 90 minutes
- Production companies: Disney Branded Television; Disney Channel; Bloor Street Productions; Resonate Entertainment
- Budget: $40 million

Original release
- Network: Disney+
- Release: July 15, 2022

Related
- Zombies (2018); Zombies 2 (2020); Zombies: The Re-Animated Series (2024); Zombies 4: Dawn of the Vampires (2025); Zombies 5: Secrets of the Sea (2027)

Zombies 3 (Note: The film's title is sometimes stylized with hyphens as Z-O-M-B-I-E-S 3. Occasionally, some media outlets abbreviate the film to "Z3") is a 2022 American science fiction musical comedy-drama film that premiered on Disney+ on July 15, 2022, and Disney Channel on August 12, 2022. A sequel to the 2018 film Zombies and the 2020 film Zombies 2, it stars Meg Donnelly and Milo Manheim reprising their lead roles as Addison and Zed, respectively. Most of the main supporting cast from the first two Zombies films also return. The film follows the town of Seabrook, which now hosts zombies, humans, and werewolves all coexisting in harmony, as they attempt to repel an alien invasion.

== Plot ==
In the town of Seabrook, werewolves, humans and zombies live in peace. It is their senior and last year at Seabrook High and Addison has been accepted into Mountain College. Zed is pursuing an athletic scholarship at Mountain College and is hoping to join Addison there. During the night before a highly anticipated football game, where, should they win, Seabrook will have their first zombie/monster recruited into college, bringing down a barrier for all other monsters, a UFO arrives and causes mass panic. The alien leaders, called "A-Lan, A-Li and A-Spen", teleport down from their ship. The aliens are in search of an interstellar map to Utopia, a new home for their species, which can only be found in "the most precious thing in Seabrook". To cover up their real purpose, they claim to be here to compete in the National Cheer Off, which Addison previously had organized. While being interrogated by Z-Patrol, A-Spen finds a loophole so Zed can get into college by having an exceptional scholarship from improving his grades.

Willa, Wyatt and Wynter, the three leaders of the werewolves, are extremely distrustful of the aliens, as they think they are there to take what is theirs. The aliens settle into Seabrook temporarily. The aliens interrogate the werewolves and scan their minds with their Luma Lenses to find what is the most precious thing in Seabrook. Eliza, who is currently interning at Z-Corp, the maker of the Z-bands, helps Zed with his scholarship. However, the aliens beat Zed's records, both athletic and academic, lowering his chances of entering college. Zed, in return for the aliens altering his report card, helps the aliens identify the moonstone, which they scan for coordinates and discover is lethal to them. A-Spen meets Addison, whom they reveal to that they are in love with Zed. At cheer practice, the cheer team is threatened after witnessing the aliens practice. The aliens are almost caught by the werewolves and head to their Mothership where Zed helps them with his knowledge of Seabrook, whereas Addison is mistakenly beamed up to the Mothership. A-Spen, A-Li and A-Lan reveal their true reasons for arriving in Seabrook. After fixing and watching the Scout's logs, they discover that the scout is none other than Addison's maternal grandmother, Angie. (Bucky, Addison's cousin, is not related to Angie, as he is related to Addison on her father's side.)

Zed is nervous for his home college interview, which is the last thing he needs to overcome before finding out if he has been accepted in Mountain College. Addison's alien powers cause him to "zombie out" during his interview, causing his interviewer, Ms. Crabtree, to leave. Addison questions her identity as an alien, asking her mom about her grandma. The trio of aliens suspect that the Seabrook Cup, which is the trophy Angie created and now awarded to the winning team of the Cheer Off, which is crafted with materials from their home world, is their map home. Addison discovers this same thing soon after and realizes either the aliens win it or she does. The werewolves discover the aliens' mission and alert the Z-Patrol. Zed, after learning he was accepted into college, discovers the Z-Patrol's orders and tries to stop the aliens from competing in the Cheer-Off. The extraterrestrial team is disqualified, leaving Addison as their only chance of finding Utopia. The Seabrook Mighty Shrimp are victorious at the competition and win.

The werewolves crash into the cheer pavilion and reveal the aliens' plans. The aliens, Addison and Zed escape before Addison reveals to the town her alien heritage. Zed reveals his college news and the aliens realize that the coordinates to Utopia lie in Addison's DNA. Unfortunately, their map is dynamic, meaning they must take Addison to their new home. A conflicted Addison agrees to go. Zed offers to go with her, but it's impossible as he would be killed by their stardust energy within minutes. The day the aliens and Addison are set to leave for Utopia, the aliens' ship is critically damaged, so the werewolves offer their moonstone and Eliza states that they could charge the ship by filtering the moonstone's energy through their Z-Bands. Zed risks his life by interfering with the power of the aliens and the moonstone, though he survives. As the others race to exit the ship before it releases into space, Addison and Zed share one last kiss before he is beamed back to Earth and the spaceship disappears into hyperspace.

A few days later, in a world without Addison, the group celebrates their graduation as the aliens decrypt Addison's DNA as the map coordinates. Addison realizes that her grandma Angie wanted her species to live on Earth, just as the map is decoded into revealing that Earth was Utopia the entire time, confirming Addison's beliefs. The aliens then return to Seabrook, as a joyful Zed, Bree, Willa, Wynter, Wyatt, Bonzo, Bucky and the Aceys celebrate their return. Afterwards, the aliens fully move in to Seabrook, along with several other monsters and creatures including vampires and merfolk.

During the credits, Bucky is shown boarding Mothership and activating it for launch, aiming to "bring cheer to the farthest reaches of the galaxy".

== Cast ==
- Meg Donnelly as Addison Wells, and Zed’s girlfriend
- Milo Manheim as Zed Necrodopolis, a zombie and Addison’s boyfriend
- Trevor Tordjman as Bucky, Addison’s cousin
- Kylee Russell as Eliza
- Carla Jeffery (Note: This was Jeffery's final film role before her death in September 2026.)as Bree, Addison’s best friend
- Chandler Kinney as Willa
- Pearce Joza as Wyatt
- Baby Ariel as Wynter
- Terry Hu as A-Spen
- Matt Cornett as A-Lan
- Kyra Tantao as A-Li
- Kingston Foster as Zoey
- James Godfrey as Bonzo
- RuPaul as the voice of the Mothership
- Emilia McCarthy as Lacey
- Noah Zulfikar as Jacey
- Jasmine Renée Thomas as Stacey
- Naomi Snieckus as Principal Lee
- Paul Hopkins as Dale-Addison father
- Marie Ward as Missy-Addison mother
- Sheila McCarthy as Angie
- Jonathan Langdon as Coach
- Tony Nappo as Zevon
- Daniel Ryan-Astley as Alien

== Production ==
=== Casting ===
On March 22, 2021, a third film, titled Zombies 3, was announced, with filming set to take place in the spring in Toronto, Canada, and the University of Toronto Mississauga. Milo Manheim and Meg Donnelly reprised their respective roles of Zed and Addison. Paul Hoen served as the director, while Bloor Street Productions served as the production company. David Light, Joseph Raso, Suzanne Farwell, and Resonate Entertainment served as executive producers. On May 19, 2021, it was announced that Matt Cornett, Kyra Tantao, Terry Hu were cast in the film in the respective roles of A-Lan, A-Li, and A-Spen. Chandler Kinney, Pearce Joza, Baby Ariel, Trevor Tordjman, Carla Jeffery, Kylee Russell, James Godfrey, and Kingston Foster also returned in their respective roles. Production on the film began on May 31, 2021, and wrapped in July 2021. The music video for the song "What Is This Feeling" was filmed in Los Angeles in September 2021. On May 20, 2022, RuPaul was announced to have joined the cast as the voice of "The Mothership", described in the official synopsis as "a comedically passive-aggressive UFO".

Due to her pregnancy, Kylee Russell was unable to film with the rest of the cast; her scenes were accomplished through only showing her torso-up in shots and interacts with the rest of the cast through a robot body.

== Soundtrack ==
The soundtrack was released on July 15, 2022. It consists of 11 original songs.

Chart performance for Zombies 3 (Original Soundtrack)
Chart (2022)	Peak position
UK Album Downloads (OCC)	58
UK Soundtrack Albums (OCC)	27
US Billboard 200	79
US Kid Albums (Billboard)	1
US Top Soundtracks (Billboard)	3

== Release ==
Zombies 3 was released on July 15, 2022, on Disney+. The film also aired on Disney Channel on August 12, billed as a "Lost Song edition". The scene where A-spen reveals to Addison that they are in love with Zed, Bree, Addison, Willa, Wynter and A-spen sing about the feeling of being in love, the song being titled as "What Is This Feeling?"

== Reception ==
=== Viewership ===
Whip Media, which tracks viewership data for the more than 21 million worldwide users of its TV Time app, reported that Zombies 3 was the fourth most-streamed film in the U.S. during the week of July 15, 2022. Nielsen Media Research, which records streaming viewership on certain U.S. television screens, calculated that Zombies 3 was the seventh most-streamed film with 332 million minutes viewed from July 11–17, 2022.

=== Critical response ===
On the review aggregator website Rotten Tomatoes, 75% of 8 critics' reviews are positive, with an average rating of 6.30/10.

Sourav Chakraborty of Sportskeeda found Zombies 3 to be a solid finale in the Zombies franchise, praised the film for its depiction of love, acceptance, and equality, applauded the soundtrack of the film across its songs and the chemistry between the characters, and complimented the premise involving extraterrestrial characters. John Serba of Decider praised the music and the choreography, stating the songs manage to be appealing, and complimented the film's message dealing with acceptance and inclusion, while finding the film colorful, garish, and sometimes nonsensical. Jennifer Green of Common Sense Media rated the film 3 out of 5 stars, praised the presence of positive messages and role models, citing diversity, equality, and inclusion, and complimented the diverse representations.

Lena Wilson of The New York Times wrote that the film is much more than "90 minutes of silliness" and praised its tone, but criticized how Zombies 3 portrayed socio-cultural differences, specifically Terry Hu's queer character. Brian Lowry of CNN found the film energic and progressive, but wrote that the film was "dead on arrival" and "hard to get fired up for," voicing concern at the use of aliens (which he found clichéd) after the first two films had depicted zombies and werewolves, and found the songs to be of mediocre quality, except "I'm Finally Me" and the reprise of "Someday."

=== Accolades ===
Year	Award	Category	Nominee(s)	Result	Ref.
2023	GLAAD Media Awards	Outstanding Kids and Family Programming - Live Action	Zombies 3	Nominated	
2023	CAFTCAD Awards	Excellence in Crafts - Illustrations	Zombies 3	Nominated	
2023	Canadian Cinema Editors Awards	Best Editing in a Live Action Family Series or MOW	Lisa Binkley	Nominated	
2023	Children's and Family Emmy Awards	Outstanding Sound Mixing and Sound Editing for a Live Action Program	Zombies 3	Nominated	

== Sequel ==
On February 10, 2024, Disney Branded Television greenlit a fourth film, titled Zombies 4: Dawn of the Vampires. Production began in March 2024 in New Zealand, and the film premiered on Disney Channel on July 10, 2025, with a release on Disney+ the following day.
