= Zombies: The Re-Animated Series =

- Genre: Musical; Comedy horror
- Based on: Zombies by; David Light; Joseph Raso
- Developed by: Aliki Theofilopoulos; Jack Ferraiolo
- Directed by: Justin Lovell Steve Rolston Eden Riegel (dialogue director)
- Voices of: Meg Donnelly; Milo Manheim; Ariel Martin; Chandler Kinney; Pearce Joza; Carla Jeffery; Trevor Tordjman; James Godfrey; Kylee Russell; Terry Hu
- Theme music composer: Matt Wong; Jack Kugell; Hanna Jones
- Opening theme: "My Year (The Re-Animated Remix)"
- Composer: Amit May Cohen
- Countries of origin: Canada; United States
- Original language: English
- No. of seasons: 2
- No. of episodes: 30

Production
- Executive producers: Aliki Theofilopoulos; Jack Ferraiolo; Gary Marsh; David Light; Joseph Raso
- Producer: Melanie Pal
- Running time: 22 minutes (11 minutes per segment)
- Production companies: Atomic Cartoons; Disney Television Animation

Original release
- Network: Disney Channel
- Release: June 28, 2024 – October 27, 2026

Related
- Zombies; Zombies 2 Zombies 3 Zombies 4: Dawn of the Vampires; Zombies 5: Secrets of the Sea

Zombies: The Re-Animated Series is an animated musical television series based on the Disney franchise Zombies. It is produced by Disney Television Animation and animated by Atomic Cartoons. The show brings back most of the original cast from the first three films. Zombies: The Re-Animated Series premiered on June 28, 2024 at Disney Channel. A second and final season premiered on October 27, 2026.

== Premise ==
Taking place after Zombies 3 and before Zombies 4: Dawn of the Vampires, following graduation day at Seabrook High School, A-Spen does a time warp that enables everyone to redo senior year together as they engage in various misadventures in Seabrook.

== Characters ==
=== Main ===
- Addison Wells (voiced by Meg Donnelly) – The head cheerleader, who is a human/alien hybrid.
- Zed Necrodopolis (voiced by Milo Manheim) – A zombie and star football player who is Addison's boyfriend.
- Wynter Barkowitz (voiced by Ariel Martin) – An overeager werewolf.
- Willa Lykensen (voiced by Chandler Kinney) – A werewolf who is the leader of her group.
- Wyatt Lykensen (voiced by Pearce Joza) – A werewolf who is Willa's brother and Eliza's love interest.
- Bree (voiced by Carla Jeffery) – A human cheerleader who is Addison's best friend. This was Jeffery's final television role before her death on September 1, 2026.
- Bucky Buchanan (voiced by Trevor Tordjman) – Addison's self-absorbed human cousin and the former head cheerleader.
- Bonzo (voiced by James Godfrey) – A zombie who is Zed's friend and Bree's boyfriend. He only speaks zombie language, which the other characters understand.
- Eliza Zambi (voiced by Kylee Russell) – A genius zombie and friend of Zed, who is dating Wyatt.
- A-Spen (voiced by Terry Hu) – An alien who enabled the time warp to happen so that everyone could re-do their senior year.

=== Others ===
- Principal Lee (voiced by Naomi Snieckus) – The human principal of Seabrook High School.
- Coach (voiced by Jonathan Langdon) – The unnamed human gym teacher and football coach of Seabrook High School.
- Razzy (voiced by Eden Riegel) – A demon cat that was adopted by the coach.
- Dae (voiced by Kahyun Kim) – A witch who is a new student at Seabrook High School.
  - Bartleby – Dae's armadillo familiar.
  - Ashley (voiced by Margaret Cho) – Dae's aunt.
- Zoey Necrodopolis (voiced by Kingston Foster) – A zombie who is Zed's younger sister.
- Motherboard (voiced by Jackée Harry) – The A.I. of the aliens' UFO. It was previously voiced by RuPaul in Zombies 3.
- Sasquatch (voiced by Chris Diamantopoulos) – A sasquatch that lives near Seabrook whose kind have been old enemies of the werewolves.
- Fiona (voiced by Wé Ani) - A fairy who loves to pull pranks, especially on Bucky.

== Episodes ==
=== Series overview ===
Season	Episodes	Originally released	
Season	Episodes	First released	Last released
Shorts	12	July 21, 2023	December 31, 2023
1	20	June 28, 2024	December 7, 2024
2	10	October 27, 2026	

=== Zombies: The Re-Animated Series Shorts (2023) ===
No.	Title	Original release date
1	"Endless Summer"	July 21, 2023
2	"Solstice Slasher"	July 28, 2023
3	"Grill or Be Grilled"	August 4, 2023
4	"Cabin in the House"	August 11, 2023
5	"ZOMBIES Summer Mini Bites"	August 28, 2023
6	"Suddenly Seabrook"	September 2, 2023
7	"I Think We're a Clone Now"	September 9, 2023
8	"Coach's Cat"	September 16, 2023
9	"Robot Space Bear"	September 23, 2023
10	"Wynter Transport"	September 30, 2023
11	"ZOMBIES Halloween Mini Bites"	October 28, 2023
12	"ZOMBIES Mini Bites"	December 31, 2023

=== Season 1 (2024) ===
No. overall	No. in season	Title	Directed by	Written by	Storyboarded by	Original release date	Prod. code
1	1	"Re-Senior Year"	Justin Lovell	Aliki Theofilopoulos; Jack Ferraiolo	Rebecca Champagne; Stephanie Gonzaga	June 28, 2024	101
1	1	"I Scream Zoda"	Steve Rolston	Rachel McNevin	Gemma; Nick Nason	June 28, 2024	101
2	2	"Rage Against the Vending Machine"	Justin Lovell	Joey Manderino	Rachel Colucci	June 28, 2024	102
2	2	"Young, Wild, and Free Period"	Steve Rolston	Mike Yank	Ammie Lieu-Dang; Rebecca Champagne	June 28, 2024	102
3	3	"These Boots Were Made for Willa"	Justin Lovell	Joan Ford	River Minho Kim; Rebecca Champagne	July 6, 2024 (Note: This episode was first released on Disney+ on June 29, 2024.)	103
3	3	"Double Troubled"	Steve Rolston	Elliott Maya	Alison Jensen Tsui; Nick Nason	July 6, 2024	103
4	4	"Alien vs. Shredator"	Justin Lovell	Mike Yank	Rebecca Champagne	July 6, 2024	104
4	4	"A Wyatt Place"	Steve Rolston	Joey Manderino	Shawn Pedralba; Gemma	July 6, 2024	104
5	5	"Invasion of the Bucky Snatchers"	Steve Rolston	Joan Ford	Gemma	July 13, 2024	105
5	5	"The Dining"	Justin Lovell	Jack Ferraiolo; Rachel McNevin	Yoshiko Aurelie Agresta	July 13, 2024	105
6	6	"Training Dae"	Steve Rolston	Jack Ferraiolo; Rachel McNevin	Ammie Lieu-Dang; Riccardo Durante	July 13, 2024	106
6	6	"Youngins & Dragons"	Justin Lovell	Elliott Maya	Rachel Colucci	July 13, 2024	106
7	7	"Foul Play"	Justin Lovell	Joey Manderino	Alison Jensen Tsui	July 20, 2024	107
7	7	"Catch Meat If You Can"	Steve Rolston	Mike Yank	Jeremy Bondy	July 20, 2024	107
8	8	"When Bucky Met Barky"	Justin Lovell	Joan Ford	Jon Affolter	July 20, 2024	108
8	8	"The More, The Burier"	Steve Rolston	Elliott Maya	Shawn Pedralba; Gemma	July 20, 2024	108
9	9	"No Woman BFF'd Behind"	Justin Lovell	Teresa Kale	Yoshiko Aurelie Agresta	July 27, 2024	109
9	9	"Pet Peeves"	Steve Rolston	Joey Manderino	Christos Rousakos	July 27, 2024	109
10	10	"Something to Tok About"	Justin Lovell	Mike Yank	Rachel Colucci	July 27, 2024	110
10	10	"Last Fan Standing"	Steve Rolston	Joan Ford	Brian-Rey Ejar	July 27, 2024	110
11	11	"Reality Check, Please!"	Justin Lovell	Elliott Maya	Oliver Hine	August 3, 2024	111
11	11	"Their Guy Sasquatch"	Steve Rolston	Roma Murphy	Christopher Johnson	August 3, 2024	111
12	12	"Screambrook"	Justin Lovell	Rachel McNevin; Mike Yank	Jon Affolter; Jeremy Bondy	October 5, 2024	112
13	13	"The Return of the Living Zed"	Steve Rolston	Joey Manderino	Yoshiko Aurelie Agresta	October 12, 2024 (Note: This episode was first released on Disney+ on October 9, 2024.)	113
13	13	"Paint It Blech"	Justin Lovell	Joan Ford	Christos Rousakos	October 12, 2024	113
14	14	"The Dark Side of the Moonies"	Steve Rolston	Teresa Kale	Brian-Rey Ejar	October 19, 2024	114
14	14	"AWOOtiful Mind"	Justin Lovell	Mike Yank	Rachel Colucci	October 19, 2024	114
15	15	"Teeny Witch"	Steve Rolston	Joey Manderino	Oliver Hine	October 26, 2024	115
15	15	"The Hunter Games"	Justin Lovell	Mike Yank	Christopher Johnson	October 26, 2024	115
16	16	"A Fridge Too Far"	Steve Rolston	Elliott Maya	Jon Affolter	November 2, 2024	116
16	16	"The Ter-meh-nator"	Justin Lovell	Roma Murphy; Rachel McNevin	Jeremy Bondy	November 2, 2024	116
17	17	"Waved and Confused"	Justin Lovell	Rachel McNevin	Riccardo Durante	November 9, 2024	120
17	17	"Abandon Zip"	Steve Rolston	Joey Manderino	Rachel Colucci	November 9, 2024	120
18	18	"Crazy, Stupid, Crush"	Justin Lovell	Elliot Maya	Oliver Hine	November 16, 2024	118
18	18	"Ready Player Wynter"	Steve Rolston	Joan Ford	Christopher Johnson	November 16, 2024	118
19	19	"I Wanna Dance with SomeZombie"	Justin Lovell	Rachel McNevin; Mike Yank	Jon Affolter; Jeremy Bondy	November 23, 2024	119
20	20	"Santler Claws is Comin' to Town"	Steve Rolston	Joan Ford	Yoshiko Aurelie Agresta; James Q. Nguyen	December 7, 2024	117

=== Season 2 (2026) ===
No. overall	No. in season	Title	Directed by	Written by	Storyboarded by	Original release date	Prod. code
21	1	"Fiends in High Places"	Steve Rolston	Rachel McNevin	Rachel Colucci	October 27, 2026	TBA
21	1	"GET OUT (please)"	Justin Lovell	Joey Manderino	Jeremy Bondy	October 27, 2026	TBA
22	2	"Impractical Magic"	Justin Lovell	Joan Ford	Colin Shi	October 27, 2026	TBA
22	2	"Bond Over Backwards"	Steve Rolston	Roxy Simmons	Tess Eneli Reid	October 27, 2026	TBA
23	3	"The Fairy Prankster"	Justin Lovell	Jack Ferraiolo; Rachel McNevin	Colin Shi	October 27, 2026	TBA
23	3	"Swarmed and Dangerous"	Steve Rolston	Mikki Crisostomo	Tess Eneli Reid	October 27, 2026	TBA
24	4	"Buckventures in Babysitting"	Steve Rolston; Sebastian Brodin	Joey Manderino	Stephanie Blakey; Rodrigo Villarreal; Jessie Xiang	October 27, 2026	TBA
24	4	"Werecity Blues"	Justin Lovell	Mike Yank	Chris Johnson	October 27, 2026	TBA
25	5	"Girl, Wynterrupted"	Sebastian Brodin; Justin Lovell	Mike Yank	Rachel Colucci; Jeremy Bondy	October 27, 2026	TBA
25	5	"Bunny Games"	Steve Rolston	Joan Ford	Shiyeon Cho	October 27, 2026	TBA
26	6	"Pandora's Prawx"	Steve Rolston	Joey Manderino	Rachel Colucci	October 27, 2026	TBA
26	6	"Game Fright"	Justin Lovell	Brendan Hay	Jeremy Bondy	October 27, 2026	TBA
27	7	"Untrue Detective"	Steve Rolston; Sebastian Brodin	Mike Yank	Michael Kodderitzsch	October 27, 2026	TBA
27	7	"Room for Improv-ment"	Justin Lovell	Brendan Hay	Colin Shi	October 27, 2026	TBA
28	8	"Sk8er Wolf"	Steve Rolston	Joan Ford	Hadas Rosen	October 27, 2026	TBA
28	8	"Friend-day the 13th"	Sebastian Brodin; Justin Lovell	Claire Jia; Lisa Deng	Chris Johnson	October 27, 2026	TBA
29	9	"Spookiest Dae of the Year"	Steve Rolston	Joey Manderino	Rachel Colucci; Sebastian Brodin	October 27, 2026	TBA
30	10	"Bree-Cast News"	Steve Rolston	Joan Ford	Tess Eneli Reid; Jeremy Bondy	October 27, 2026	TBA
30	10	"The Z-O-M-B-I-E-S: The Re-Animated Series Karaoke Singalong Spectacular"	Justin Lovell	Mike Yank	Rachel Colucci; Hadas Rosen	October 27, 2026	TBA

== Production ==
=== Development ===
In 2022, Descendants: Wicked World creator Aliki Theofilopoulos, and Amphibia story editor Jack Ferraiolo were approached by Disney executives to develop an animated series based on Disney Channel's Zombies franchise, which they agreed to do due to the franchise's high school setting providing multiple storytelling opportunities, having liked the Zombie films, and wanting to work together on a project.

On June 15, 2022, during the Annecy Film Festival, Disney Television Animation announced development on animated series based on the Zombies franchise, titled Zombies: The Re-Animated Series, on Disney+. Writers Joseph Raso and David Light were set to return from the original trilogy as executive producers, alongside Gary Marsh, Theofilopoulos, and Ferraiolo. Theofilopoulos and Ferraiolo also serve as showrunners for the series.

=== Writing ===
The producers wanted to use the series' animated format as "[an] opportunity to push ideas conceptually and visually" within the franchise. They also wanted the show to have a strong focus on its ensemble cast, drawing inspiration from shows such as New Girl and Freaks and Geeks, as well as teen comedies Ferraiolo watched in his youth, wanting to "juxtapose dumb ideas with achieving a goal" much like in the latter. The writers wanted the series to explore issues relatable to teenagers and "blow it out of proportion" while keeping the story grounded in "the emotional truth of being a teenager".

=== Casting ===
On August 12, 2022, Meg Donnelly and Milo Manheim were confirmed to be reprising their roles as Addison and Zed from the original trilogy. On November 18, 2022, Theofilopoulos confirmed that Carla Jeffery would reprise her role as Bree in the series. Voice recordings for the series had already began by that point. In June 2023, Ariel Martin, Chandler Kinney, Pearce Joza, Trevor Tordjman, Jonathan Langdon, James Godfrey, Kylee Russell, and Terry Hu were confirmed to be reprising their roles in the series. In May 2024, it was announced that Kahyun Kim would be voicing a new character named Dae.

=== Animation ===
Animation services are provided by Atomic Cartoons. Matt Doering serves as art director for the series. The artists designed the characters so that they could be reminiscent of their appearance in the movies while also fitting an animated format.

=== Music ===
The series features a musical number per episode, performed by its voice cast. Several songwriters from the films returned to work on the series. Theofilopoulos drew inspiration from her experience in Phineas and Ferb for the show's songs, wanting to combine the humorous tone of the Phineas and Ferb songs with the musical style from the Zombies films. She also drew inspiration from her experience in Descendants: Wicked World.

The song "My Year" from the first film serves as the series' opening theme, with new lyrics to fit the plot of the series. The songwriters originally conceived several original songs to be used as the opening theme; the songs were ultimately used as musical numbers within the series.

== Release ==
In 2023, Zombies: The Re-Animated Series Shorts premiered on July 21, on Disney Channel, Disney Channel's YouTube, and DisneyNOW, and later on Disney+. In May 2024, the trailer of Zombies: The Re-Animated Series was released. The television series premiered on June 28 on Disney Channel, and became available to stream the following day on Disney+.

== Reception ==
=== Critical response ===
Ashley Moulton of Common Sense Media gave Zombies: The Re-Animated Series a score of three out of five stars, said the series depicts positive messages and role models, citing environmentalism and the character of Addison Wells, and suggested that tweens who admire high school life can enjoy the series without encountering the more problematic aspects often associated with teenage characters in other shows. John Schwarz of Bubbleblabber rated the first episode of Zombies: The Re-Animated Series 6 out of 10, appreciated the inclusion of some of the characters, and called the aesthetic of the series "fine." However, Schwarz said the show struggles to justify its existence, arguing that 2024 is an era dominated by social content appealing to younger audiences. He also found that the songs in the premiere episodes were unimpressive and that the episode premises were clichéd and rudimentary. Lee Brown of The Review Geek rated Zombies: The Re-Animated Series 5.5 out of 10 and found it to be bright and silly, describing it appealing mainly to children who are already fans of the franchise, as it contains few jokes or themes that would resonate with older teens or grown-ups, though saying the series may not be particularly memorable. They stated that while the show offers occasional chuckles, it might not hold much appeal for those unfamiliar with or uninterested in the Zombies universe. However, Brown asserted that the series does provide positive messages that parents might appreciate discussing with their children.

=== Ratings ===
On April 28, Zombies: The Re-Animated Series drew 162,000 total viewers (P2+) with a 0.05% rating, including 65,900 viewers aged 18–49 (0.05% rating). A later broadcast on August 3, 2024, recorded 123,000 viewers (0.04% rating) and 48,000 in the 18–49 demographic (0.04% rating). As of December 7, 2024, the series was viewed by 105,000 people (0.03% rating), including 26,500 viewers aged 18–49 (0.02% rating), representing a 15% decrease from the August 3 broadcast.

=== Accolades ===
Zombies: The Re-Animated Series was nominated for Kids Digital – Best Web/App Series—Branded at the 2025 Kidscreen Awards. It also received nominations for Best Direction in an Animation Series and Best Art Direction in an Animation Series at the 2025 Leo Awards.
