= Mo Bradley =

Canadian filmmaker, professor, media artist, and curato

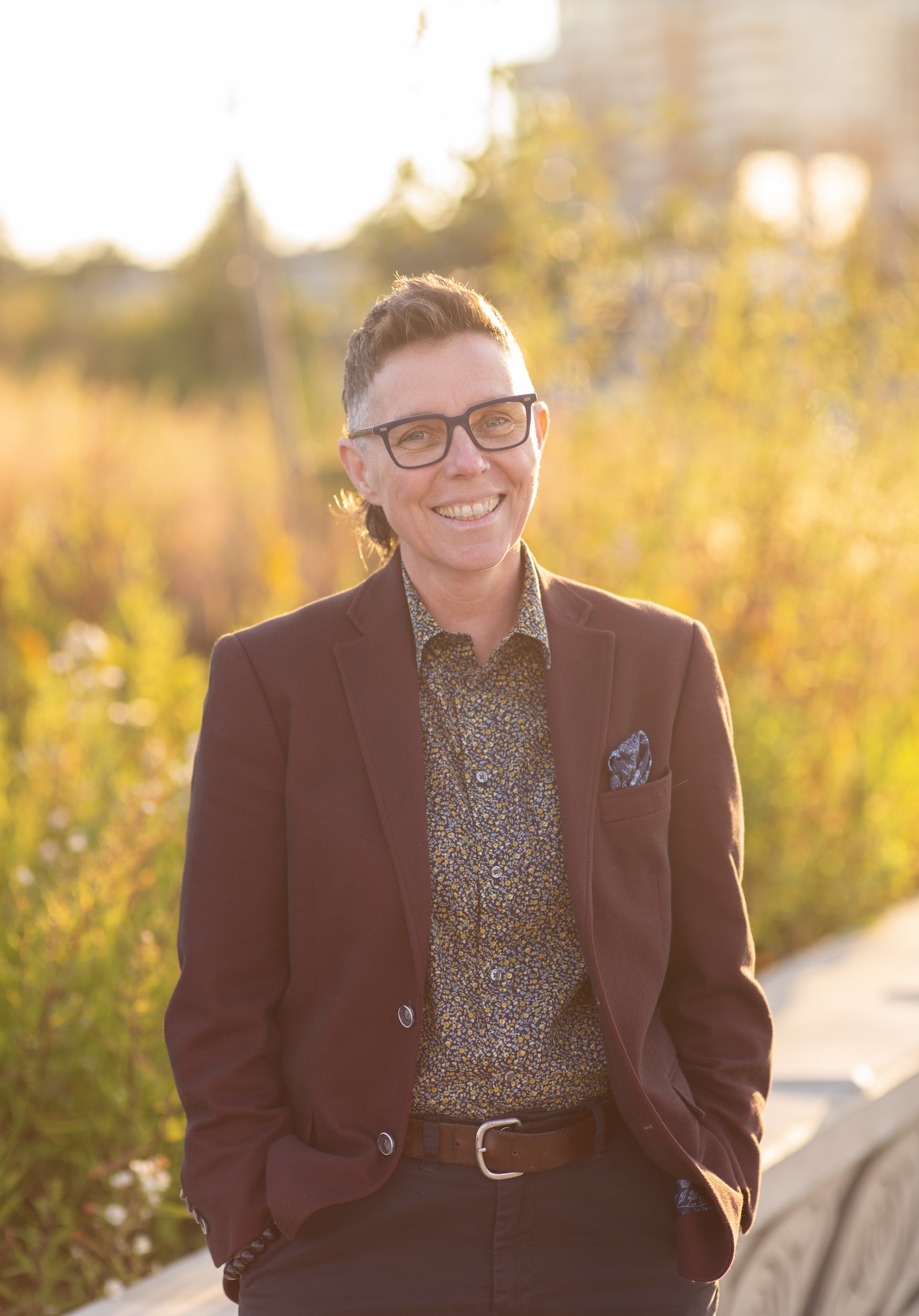
- Born: c. 1967 (age 58–59); Montreal, Quebec, Canada
- Education: Concordia University
- Occupations: filmmaker, professor, media artist, and curator

Mo Bradley (formerly Maureen Bradley; born c. 1967) is a Canadian film director, producer, screenwriter, media artist, professor, and curator. They have produced over fifty short films and their work has been recognized internationally.

== Early life and education ==
Bradley was born and raised in Montreal, Quebec. They grew up with a love of music and sound, and in their early years, pursued this love as a bassist in the underground music scene in Montréal, in the band "Sons of the Desert". Later, Bradley discovered their interest in editing, film, and media art. Since then, Bradley has played an active role in the Canadian independent film community. Their work has been featured in major venues, including the New Gallery and the Museum of Modern Art.

Bradley attended Concordia University for Communications and Media Studies. Upon their relocation to Vancouver, they furthered their education at the University of British Columbia. There, Bradley received a Master of Fine Arts degree in Film Production.

== Career ==
During their career as a Montréal-based bassist, Bradley received a VideoFACT production grant to create a music video. From there, Bradley became interested in filmmaking and media studies and later became an assistant professor of film production at the University of Regina. During their time in Regina, they were the Saskatchewan District Council of the Directors Guild of Canada's first female director in 2002. Bradley then returned to British Columbia and became an associate professor at the University of Victoria's Writing Department. In 2017, they became a full professor at the University of Victoria, where they continue to teach film and video. Using a grant they received from the Canada Foundation for Innovation, Bradley brought the Hi-Def Story Incubator Lab to life at the University of Victoria.

Bradley has been active in the film community across Canada since 1988. Their work in the Canadian film scene has been focused on challenging typical gender norms and binaries. While directing and appearing in the series Road Movies in 1992, Bradley became one of the first people ever to publicly come out on a network Canadian television series.

Bradley has contributed to various film associations within Canada, including Queer City Cinema, Video In, and the Independent Media Arts Alliance of Canada. They are also the former president of the Board of Directors of CineVic Society of Independent Filmmakers.

== Personal life ==
Bradley is queer. They reside in Victoria, British Columbia.

Growing up, Bradley most identified with the label androgynous, finding that they did not fit into the typical categories of male or female. In their 20s, Bradley identified as third gender, as that was the current term to describe people outside of the gender binary. In Queer Across Canada (1993), Bradley depicted how different regions of Canada use conflicting language to describe Bradley's gender identity and sexual orientation, becoming the first person to come out as queer on Canadian network TV.

Since 2015, Bradley has used they/them pronouns.

== Filmography ==
| Year | Title | Credit listing |
|---|---|---|
| 2001 | Last Wedding | Location production assistant |
| 2002 | The Chosen Family (Short) | Director, writer |
| 2003 | Blindspot (Short) | Director |
| 2004 | You Fake (Short) | Director, writer |
| 2005 | What Remains Human (Short) | Director, writer |
| 2009 | Freshman's Wharf (TV Mini-Series) | Producer |
| 2012 | Stuck (Short) | Executive producer |
| 2012 | Bardo Light (Short) | Executive producer |
| 2013 | Floodplain (Short) | Associate producer |
| 2014 | Godhead | Executive producer |
| 2014 | Two 4 One | Executive producer, director, writer, editor |
| 2014 | Jackhammer | Associate producer |
| 2014 | 'Til Death (Short) | Producer |
| 2026 | The Bryce Lee Story | Cowriter |

=== Additional works ===
- We're Here, We're Queer, We're Fabulous (1990)
- Briser lâisolement: le SIA et les femmes au Québec (1990)
- Safe Sex is Hot Sex (1991)
- Road Movies (1992)
- Defiance (1993)
- Queer Across Canada (1993)
- She Thrills Me (1993)
- Not Like That (1994)
- The Weight of Women's Eyes (1994)
- Reframing the Montreal Massacre: A Media Interrogation (1995)
- Losing It (1995)
- HER (1996)
- Forever (1996)
- Tainted: Christopher Lefler and the Queer Censorship Chill (1997)
- Forever (1997)
- Go Dyke! Go! (1998)
- What I Remember (1998)
- Erased (1999)
- My Heart the Historian (2001)
- Birthday Suit Management: a 21C Homage to Lisa Steele (2001)
- Stranded (2004)
- sisyphus (2005)
- Self-storage (2006)
- Gullible (2008)
- Pants on Fire (2009)
- Beyond the Pale (2010)
- Burning Down My House (2013)
- Waylaid (2013)

== Awards and nominations ==
Bradley has received recognition for their work in the film industry in numerous film festivals. Their web series, Freshman's Wharf, received a Leo Award in 2011. Bradley's short film, Pants on Fire, was featured at the Worldfest/Houston International Film Festival and received a Golden Remi Award for Short Film Directing. Bradley has also been recognized at the Philadelphia Gay and Lesbian Film Festival, Austin Gay and Lesbian Film Festival, Reelings Festival, Chicago, and the Santa Barbara Gay and Lesbian Film Festival.

Bradley's debut film Two 4 One has received numerous awards and nominations. Bradley was personally nominated for three Leo Awards for this film, including Best Motion Picture, Best Direction in a Motion Picture, and Best Screenwriting in a Motion Picture. They were also nominated for two awards at the Vancouver International Film Festival. Lead actor Gavin Crawford received the ACTRA Award for Outstanding Performance by a Male Actor, and Gabrielle Rose won a Leo Award for Best Supporting Performance by a Female in a Motion Picture.

Additionally, artistic retrospectives based on Bradley's work have been created in cities across Canada. These retrospectives include Making Scenes (1999) and Out on Screen (1998), hosted respectively by Ottawa's Gay and Lesbian Film Festival and Vancouver's Queer Film and Video Festival.

== See also ==
- List of lesbian filmmakers
