= Baby Ariel =

American social media personality

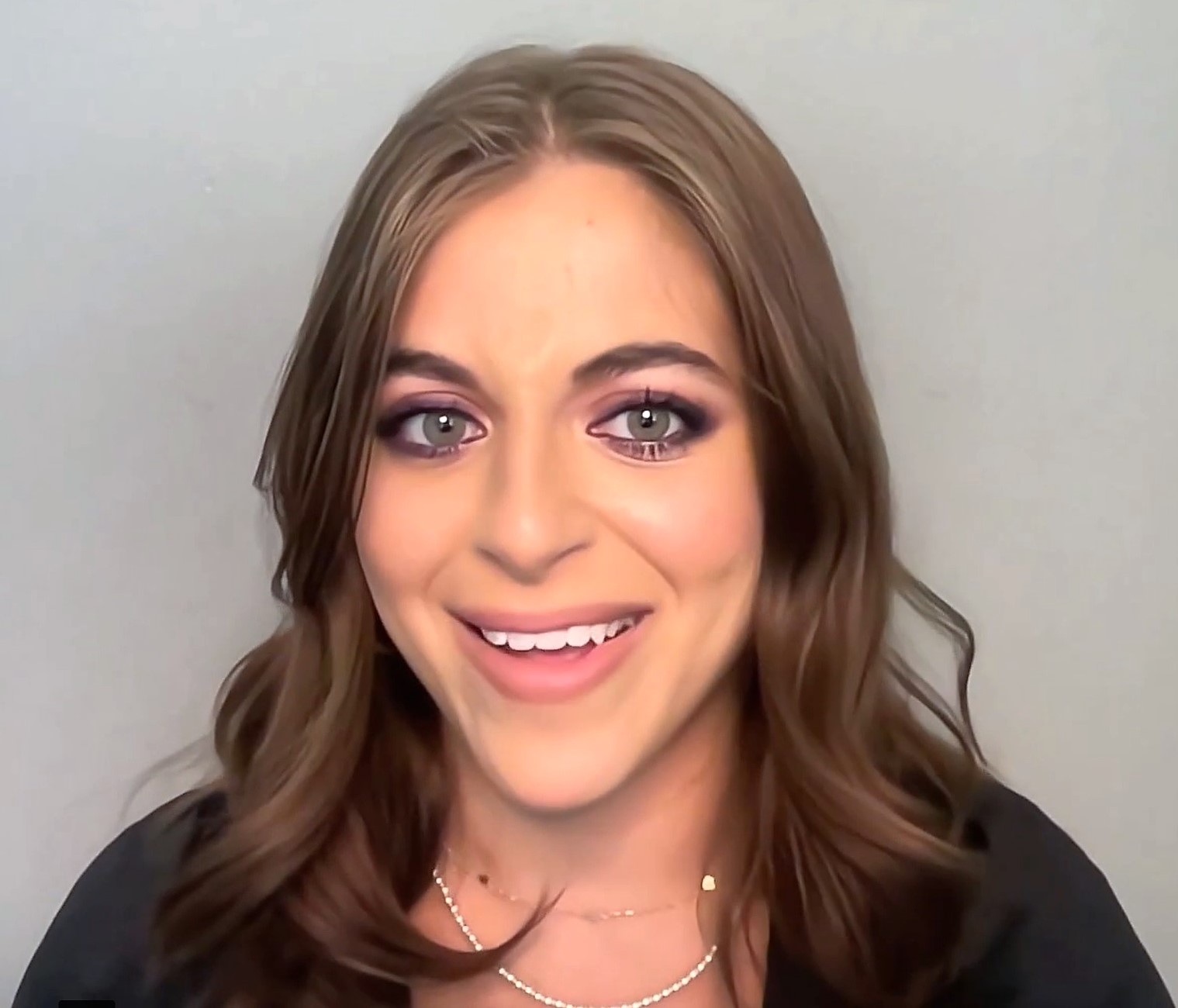
- Martin in 2022
- Born: Ariel Rebecca Martin; November 22, 2000 (age 25); Pembroke Pines, Florida, U.S.
- Occupations: Social media personality; actress; singer
- Years active: 2015–present

TikTok information
- Page: babyariel
- Followers: 36.6 million
- Last updated: March 12, 2026
- Website: babyariel.com

Ariel Rebecca Martin (born November 22, 2000), known professionally as Baby Ariel, is an American social media personality, actress and singer-songwriter who rose to fame after posting lip-syncing videos on the defunct video sharing app Musical.ly (now TikTok). She was recognized as one of the most influential people on the Internet by Time magazine in 2017, and she was featured on Forbes 2017 list of top entertainment influencers. She is known for her social media content, particularly her work on the social media platform TikTok, and for starring as Wynter Barkowitz in the Disney Channel Original Movie Zombies 2. She won the Teen Choice Award for "Choice Muser" in 2016 and 2017.

== Career ==
Ariel Rebecca Martin was born on November 22, 2000. She began her career as a creator on musical.ly in 2015, downloading the app out of boredom. In 2015, Ariel launched an anti-bullying campaign called #ArielMovement, described by BlackBook as one of her most important endeavors. People magazine recognized her for her support in the #HackHarassment initiative to stop Internet trolls and negativity on the Internet.

In 2016, Ariel was featured on the cover of Billboard magazine alongside fellow Musical.ly personality Jacob Sartorius. She has appeared on 60 Minutes and Good Morning America, and has been cited as a top influencer by Forbes, People, and USA Today. Ariel signed with Creative Artists Agency in September 2016 and released her debut single "Aww" on December 1, 2017. She released her second single "Perf" on January 17, 2018.

On March 30, 2018, Ariel released the song "Say It" with Daniel Skye. She collaborated with EA Games for The Sims 4, appearing as a Sim in the expansion pack The Sims 4: Get Famous, released in November 2018. In late 2018, Ariel starred in Baby Doll Records, a mini-series on Brat. In 2019, she starred in Bixler High Private Eye, a Nickelodeon television film. Later that year, it was announced that she would be appearing in the Disney Channel film Zombies 2, and would portray the role of Wynter.

Ariel was profiled in Fast Company, Business Insider, and Seventeen Magazine. Other mentions include CNN, Rolling Stone, Huffington Post, Tubefilter, Paper Magazine, RAW, and Wonderwall.

Ariel released her debut extended play (EP), Blue, on July 9, 2021.

== Personal life ==
Martin is Jewish and was born in Pembroke Pines, Florida, to a Panamanian father and Cuban-Israeli mother.

== Discography ==
=== Singles ===
List of singles, showing year released and album name
| Year | Title | Peak chart positions | Album |
| Year | Title | JPN OVS | Album |
|---|---|---|---|
| 2017 | "Aww" | 10 | Non-album singles |
| 2018 | "Perf" | — | Non-album singles |
| 2018 | "Say It" (featuring Daniel Skye) | — | Non-album singles |
| 2018 | "Gucci on My Body" | — | Non-album singles |
| 2018 | "8 Letters" | — | Non-album singles |
| 2019 | "I Heart You" | — | Non-album singles |
| 2019 | "Wildside" | — | Non-album singles |
| 2020 | "The New Kid in Town" | — | Zombies 2 Soundtrack |
| | "—" denotes a recording that did not chart or was not released in that territory. | | |

=== EP ===
- Blue (2021)

== Filmography ==
Television

| Year | Title | Role | Notes |
|---|---|---|---|
| 2017 | Bizaardvark | Tiffany | Episode: "A Killer Robot Christmas" |
| 2018 | Chicken Girls | Dru | Main role (season 2) |
| 2018 | Baby Doll Records | Dru | Main role |
| 2018 | Henry Danger | Patina | Episode: "Great Cactus Con" |
| 2019 | Double Dare | Herself | Episode: "Halloween Week Game 2" |
| 2020 | The Substitute | Herself | Episode: "Baby Ariel" |
| 2020 | Disney Fam Jam | Herself | Television special |
| 2020 | Group Chat with Annie & Jayden | Herself | Episode: "There's a Cockroach in My Room" |
| 2021 | Family Reunion | Jinji Starr | Episode: "Remember the False Idol?" |
| 2024 | Zombies: The Re-Animated Series | Wynter Barkowitz | Main role |
| 2025 | Vampirina: Teenage Vampire | Emily Eisenberg / Millie Eyelash | Guest star; 2 episodes |

Film

| Year | Title | Role | Notes |
|---|---|---|---|
| 2019 | Bixler High Private Eye | Kenzie Messina | |
| 2020 | Zombies 2 | Wynter | |
| 2022 | Zombies 3 | Wynter | |
| 2023 | Oracle | Jasmine | Credited as Ariel Rebecca Martin |
| 2024 | Suncoast | Megan Kaminski | |

=== Music videos ===
| Year | Song | Artist(s) | Director(s) |
|---|---|---|---|
| 2017 | "Personal" | Hrvy | Ivanna Borin |
| 2020 | "Cake" | Loren Gray | Nikko LaMere |

== Awards and nominations ==
Ariel won the Teen Choice Award for "Choice Muser" in 2016 and 2017. She was also nominated for "Breakout Creator" and "Entertainer of the Year" at the 2016 Streamy Awards. In 2017, she was nominated for "Favorite Social Media Star" at the People's Choice Awards, "Social Star Award" at the iHeartRadio Music Awards, "Muser of the Year" at the Shorty Awards, and "Favorite Influencer" at the Premios Tu Mundo.

| Year | Award show | Category | Result | Ref. |
|---|---|---|---|---|
| 2016 | Teen Choice Award | Choice Muser | Won | |
| 2016 | Streamy Awards | Breakout Creator | Nominated | |
| 2016 | Streamy Awards | Entertainer of the Year | Nominated | |
| 2017 | Teen Choice Award | Choice Muser | Won | |
| 2017 | People's Choice Awards | Favorite Social Media Star | Nominated | |
| 2017 | iHeartRadio Music Awards | Social Star Award | Nominated | |
| 2017 | Shorty Awards | Muser of the Year | Nominated | |
| 2017 | Premios Tu Mundo | Favorite Influencer | Nominated | |
