= Paul Hopkins (actor) =

Canadian actor

- Born: July 12, 1968 (age 56); Ottawa, Ontario, Canada
- Years active: 1994–present

Paul Hopkins (born July 12, 1968) is a Canadian actor. He is also a theatre producer and director.

== Career ==
As an actor, he is known for his portrayal of Michael "Mouse" Tolliver in the TV miniseries More Tales of the City (1998) and its follow-up Further Tales of the City (2001). These miniseries were sequels to Tales of the City (1993), which starred Marcus D'Amico in the role of Mouse. Paul is also known for his portrayal of Karl in the Canadian TV series Vampire High (2001–2002) and Jim Bouchard on 19-2.

Between 2004 and 2005, Hopkins spent two seasons with the Stratford Festival of Canada, where he was a member of the Birmingham Conservatory of Classical Theatre Training.

In 2007, he became the artistic director and producer of Repercussion Theatre, Montreal's touring Shakespeare-in-the-Park company, a position he held until 2015. During his tenure he oversaw over 200 presentations seen by over 70,000 people throughout Greater Montreal and the province of Quebec. These presentations included seven Shakespeare-in-the-Park tours, two co-productions with the Montreal Baroque Festival (Macbeth in Hell: A Cabaret! and Henry Purcell's The Fairy Queen), Shakespeare Unplugged, and, in collaboration with Centaur Theatre's Wildside Festival, Repercussion Theatre presented Raoul Bhaneja's Hamlet Solo and Teaching Hamlet by Keir Cutler.

While at Repercussion Theatre, Hopkins conceived innovative ways to create strong community ties and loyal audiences. Since 2010, approximately 100 local youth were featured in cameo roles in the summer productions and children's workshops were added, resulting in pre-show vignettes performed by the young participants that were introduced to Shakespeare and live theatre in a fun, interactive way. Repercussion Theatre also became a research partner in a five-year project called Early Modern Conversions, Religions, Cultures, Cognitive Ecologies led by McGill University’s Institute for the Public Life of Arts and Ideas (IPLAI).

In 2013, Hopkins' efforts were recognized when he was named one of three finalists for the Christopher Plummer Award of Excellence in Classical Theatre by the Shakespeare Globe Centre of Canada.

== Filmography ==
Title	Year	Episode	Character
Are You Afraid of the Dark?	1994	The Tale of Long Ago Locket (1994)	Lt. William
Highlander III: The Sorcerer	1994		Tommy
War at Sea: The Black Pit	1995		Ken Lunny
Snowboard Academy	1996		Paul Barry
For Love Alone: the Ivana Trump Story	1996		
A Young Connecticut Yankee in King Arthur's Court	1996		Sir Galahad
Captive	1998		Paul Summers
The Hunger	1998–2000	Hidebound (1998) – I'm Very Dangerous Tonight (2000)	Colin King / Henry Seecam
More Tales of the City	1998		Michael "Mouse" Tolliver
Who Gets the House?	1999		Hoss' Son
The Legend of Sleepy Hollow (TV movie)	1999		Knickerbocker
The Great Gatsby (2000 film)	2000		Police Detective
Are You Afraid of the Dark?	2000	The Tale of the Last Dance	Lurker
Nuremberg (2000 film)	2000		Capt. Kiley
Island of the Dead	2000		Rodger Mackloe
The Art of War	2000		Ray, FBI Agent
Big Wolf on Campus	1999–2001	Stormy Weather (2001); The Wolf is Out There (1999)	Chris Cutler / Stormfront
Vampire High	2001–2002		Karl Todman
Further Tales of the City	2001		Michael "Mouse" Tolliver
Aftermath (2002 film)	2002		Agent Burton
Bliss (TV series)	2002	In Praise of Drunkenness and Fornication	John
Tracker (TV series)	2002	Remember When; Back into the Breach; Breach	Ramel / Wes Furley / Kres
Mambo Italiano (film)	2003		Hunky Pilot
Alien Tracker (video)	2003		
My First Wedding (2006 film)	2006		Andre
The Covenant	2006		Fireman
Thrill of the Kill	2006		Hank
Still Life	2007		Henry Lemon
Stephen King's Dead Zone	2007	Outcome	Andrew
The Perfect Assistant	2008		John Price
The Double Life of Eleanor Kendall	2008		McGuire – Dave
Die	2010		Cop #1
Being Human	2011	Some Thing to Watch Over Me	Officer Garrity'
Jack of Diamonds	2011		Vance Vartan
Nanny's revenge	2012		Mark Wright
Assassin's Creed III	2012		Benedict Arnold (voice)
Shockwave	2013		Paul
Red 2	2013		Funeral Director
Charming Christmas	2015		Daniel Botchwick
19-2	2015–2016	Recurring Role	Jim Bouchard
Zombies	2018	Disney Channel Original Movie	Dale
