= Prom Pact =

2023 television film by Anya Adams

- Official release poster
- Genre: Romantic comedy
- Written by: Anthony Lombardo
- Directed by: Anya Adams
- Starring: Peyton Elizabeth Lee; Milo Manheim; Blake Draper; Monique Green; Arica Himmel; Jason Sakaki; David S. Jung; Wendi McLendon-Covey; Margaret Cho
- Music by: The Newton Brothers
- Country of origin: United States
- Original language: English

Production
- Executive producers: Julie Bowen; Melvin Mar; Jake Kasdan; Rachael Field; Anya Adams
- Running time: 98 minutes
- Production companies: Bowen and Sons; The Detective Agency; Bear Claw Productions, Ltd; Disney Channel; Reel One Entertainment

Original release
- Network: Disney Channel
- Release: March 30, 2023

Prom Pact is an American romantic comedy television film directed by Anya Adams. The film stars Peyton Elizabeth Lee, Milo Manheim, Margaret Cho, Blake Draper, Monique Green, Arica Himmel, Jason Sakaki, David S. Jung, and Wendi McLendon-Covey. Initially intended to be a Disney+ exclusive, the film premiered March 30, 2023, on Disney Channel, due to the network loving the film and its final version. It received generally positive reviews from critics. The movie received a nomination for Outstanding Fiction Special at the Children's and Family Emmy Awards.

== Plot ==
Mandy Yang is a high school senior who is obsessed with going to Harvard to achieve her dream, something which the school counselor, Ms. Chen, hears ad nauseam. Her best friend is Ben Plunkett whom everyone at school knows as "No Nuts" Plunkett due to a childhood peanut allergy incident. When it is announced that the upcoming prom will be an 80s themed bash, Ben is visibly interested in going while Mandy, not wanting to conform to typical high school rituals, is disdainful towards it, especially since it will be attended to by "Everests", a term for people who have reached their peak. Mandy ultimately gives in and makes a prom pact with Ben to attend.

When Mandy's acceptance to Harvard is put on waitlist, she goes to Ms. Chen for advice. She is reminded of her popular classmate Graham Lansing, who is the son of Senator Lansing, a Harvard alum. Mandy tells Ben her plan to get close to Graham so that she can get into Harvard and, with the help of their friends, Charles and Zenobia, finds out that Graham is doing poorly in psych and offers to tutor him. Though Graham suspects that she wants something out of it, he gives in and accepts her as a tutor. Meanwhile, Ben learns that LaToya Reynolds, a popular girl he has a crush on, actually knows him better than the rest of his classmates, much to his pleasure.

Mandy manages to break through with Graham, getting him to pass his psych class, while Graham in turn teaches her about basketball. The two of them grow close with Mandy learning that Graham is pressured by his father to make grand achievements and performs non-profits acts on the side. Mandy is eventually invited to Graham's house and even though his father is not there, Graham's mother happily promises her that she can get her to talk to her husband about Harvard at a dinner party next week. Mandy starts to put off her usual hangout time with Ben, who is initially upset, but a fortuitous night has him meeting up with LaToya who shares many of his interests.

Both Mandy and Ben continue their respective plans until Ben reminds Mandy that his birthday is coming up on Saturday, the same day as the dinner. Mandy convinces Ben to invite LaToya, who happily accepts and together have a wonderful night. At the dinner party, Mandy realizes that she has fallen in love with Graham and the two kiss. She runs into Senator Lansing and upon seeing firsthand his low opinion of his son, turns down his Harvard offer. However, she overhears Graham's brothers talking about inviting another girl while seeing Mandy on the side and she leaves the party crying. She calls Ben for help, who leaves a visibly angered LaToya as he goes to pick up Mandy. The two promise to go to prom together.

The next day at school, Mandy refuses to talk to Graham, while Ben tries to talk to a still angry LaToya. LaToya finally forgives Ben on the condition they go to prom together. Back inside, Graham makes a grand prom proposal to Mandy (she realizes the other girl he was seeing was teaching him to dance for the proposal) and she happily accepts. Upon meeting with Ben outside, she learns that Ben turned down LaToya and he snaps at her for not sticking to the pact. Students film their argument where Ben announces that Mandy was just using Graham to get a letter of recommendation to Harvard. The video is seen by Graham who gives Mandy a letter and then breaks up with her.

Mandy becomes a pariah at school and while speaking with Ms. Chen reveals that she did not turn in the letter. Realizing that she no longer cares about Harvard, she gives the letter back to Graham and then asks Ben to prom. Breaking down from her comical display, he accepts. The two get dressed and Mandy makes it up to Ben by taking him around town to fulfill their usual hangout rituals.

The two finally arrive at prom, where it is humorously revealed that besides them, no one actually dressed like it was the 80s, but they still have a good time. Mandy avoids Graham as the prom queen and king are announced as LaToya and Ben, with Ben's voted having been fixed by Ms. Chen. Not wanting to pass on the opportunity, Ben declares his love to LaToya and embraces being prom king. Ben and LaToya convince Mandy to check her Harvard status again and is surprised to see that she has been accepted. Ms. Chen reveals that she sent a letter of recommendation herself and was surprised that it actually worked.

Graduation Day arrives and Mandy makes a Salutatorian speech (she got a 94 in P.E.) that is inspired by her time with Graham, showing that she truly appreciated her time with him. Afterwards, Mandy and Ben promise to hang out when they get the chance to as Ben is happy to finally have LaToya as a girlfriend. Mandy has one final talk with Graham who reveals that he is attending UT, based on his dad's expectations. The two of them amicably part ways. Later, Mandy is at Harvard when she suddenly runs into Graham, who turned down UT and decided to take a year off to do inner city non profit work. The two of them kiss and renew their relationship.

== Cast ==
- Peyton Elizabeth Lee as Mandy Yang, a high school senior who is determined to get into Harvard.
- Milo Manheim as Ben Plunkett, Mandy's best friend.
- Blake Draper as Graham Lansing, a popular jock whose father is a senator and a Harvard alum.
- Monique Green as LaToya Reynolds, a popular cheerleader and Ben's love interest.
- Arica Himmel as Zenobia, a junior and one of Mandy's close friends.
- Jason Sakaki as Charles, a junior and one of Mandy's close friends.
- Chelah Horsdal as Mrs. Lansing, Graham's mother.
- David S. Jung as Tom Yang, Mandy's father.
- Wendi McLendon-Covey as Alyssa Yang, Mandy's mother.
- Margaret Cho as Ms. Chen, the school counselor.

== Production ==
=== Development ===
On February 6, 2022, it was announced that Disney Branded Television was developing a teen rom com film for Disney+, titled Prom Pact, starring Peyton Elizabeth Lee and Milo Manheim. Anya Adams was set to direct the film, with Anthony Lombardo serving as the writer. Julie Bowen, Melvin Mar, Jake Kasdan, Rachael Field, and Anya Adams were set to be executive producers for the film. According to Bowen, the film was originally slated to go exclusively to Disney+ but Disney Channel liked the film that they shot so much, they decided to have the world premiere air on their network on March 30.

=== Casting ===
On March 23, 2022, Margaret Cho joined the cast of the film, along with Blake Draper, Monique Green, Arica Himmel, Jason Sakaki, and David S. Jung rounding out the cast. On March 29, 2022, Wendi McLendon-Covey joined the cast as Alyssa Yang, Mandy's mother.

=== Filming ===
Filming began in Vancouver, Canada on March 14, 2022, and wrapped on April 21, 2022.

=== CGI background actors ===
A brief shot in the film included portions of a crowd, which would normally be populated with background actors, created through computer-generated imagery (CGI). Following the film's release, it was criticized on social media for the quality of the effects, and also mistakenly for being created through scanning the likenesses of background actors to train a generative artificial intelligence, which was seen as controversial because the film came out close to the 2023 SAG-AFTRA strike, in which the topic was a point of issue in contract negotiations. However, the crowd was made through standard computer-generated imagery, and no generative artificial intelligence was involved.

== Release ==
Prom Pact premiered on the Disney Channel on March 30, 2023, and was released on Disney+ on March 31, 2023. While minor bits of suggestive dialogue and language were edited out of the Disney Channel version, they were retained in the Disney+ version. Both versions maintain approximately the same runtime.

== Reception ==
=== Audience viewership ===
According to Whip Media's TV Time, which tracks viewership data for the more than 25 million worldwide users of its TV Time app, Prom Pact was the fifth most-watched film across all platforms in the United States during the week of April 2, and ranked tenth during the week of April 10, 2023.

=== Critical response ===
On the review aggregator website Rotten Tomatoes, 89% of 9 critics' reviews are positive, with an average rating of 7.20/10.

Michael Nordine of Variety described Prom Pact as a refreshing interpretation of the high school prom genre. They noted that the film stands out as a model of its genre, respecting its predecessors while also addressing and improving upon their notable shortcomings. Nordine also commended Peyton Elizabeth Lee’s performance, suggesting that it would be fitting of the legacy of Molly Ringwald. Erick Massoto of Collider awarded Prom Pact a B+ rating, highlighting it as an ideal choice for viewers seeking a light and enjoyable film. They found the cast to be excellent, the humor natural and unforced, and the story a genuine celebration of friendship and the importance of not disappointing those close to you, as well as the value of making amends if you do. Massoto suggested that the film would make John Hughes proud.

Alex Reif of LaughingPlace.com rated Prom Pact three and a half out of five. They highlighted the film for its affectionate take on the coming-of-age comedy genre, avoiding clichés like opposite-sex friends falling for each other. However, they noted that the film’s attempt to maintain Disney's family-friendly tone led it to sidestep edgier themes, making it feel tame compared to typical teen comedies. Reif suggested that the film might have been more impactful on platforms like Freeform or Hulu, where it could have embraced more genuine teenage experiences. Polly Conway of Common Sense Media rated Prom Pact three out of five stars. She praised the film for its positive messages and role models, noting its emphasis on communication in relationships and self-motivation. Conway described the film as a charming example of an edgier-than-usual Disney romcom.

=== Accolades ===
Prom Pact was nominated for Outstanding Fiction Special at the 2nd Children's and Family Emmy Awards. It was also nominated for Outstanding Directorial Achievement – Movies for Television and Mini-Series. It won Tweens/Teens Programming – Best One-Off, Special, or TV Movie at the 2024 Kidscreen Awards.
