= List of Disney Channel original films =

Since its launch on April 18, 1983, American cable and satellite television channel Disney Channel has released a number of original television films. These were named Disney Channel Premiere Films until October 1997, when the current Disney Channel Original Movie (DCOM) branding was introduced. For a period from March 2023 to August 2024 the Disney Original Movie moniker was used, before the network reverted to the earlier branding.

Most of these films were subsequently released on home video formats such as VHS, DVD, or more recently, Blu-ray, while others were not. Beginning with Princess Protection Program in 2009, releases of DCOMs on DVD months following their television premieres got reduced to a week after television premieres. The 2009 television film also became the first DCOM to appear in high-definition widescreen, although DCOMs have been produced in such a format since the release of Go Figure on June 10, 2005.

The highest-rated premiere for the banner/brand came in August 2007, when High School Musical 2 set a record for basic cable with 17.2 million viewers. The second highest-rated premiere is held by Wizards of Waverly Place: The Movie, which premiered with 11.4 million viewers. DCOMs include sequels-turned-franchises such as Under Wraps, Halloweentown, Zenon, Twitches, The Cheetah Girls, High School Musical, Camp Rock, Teen Beach, Descendants and Zombies.

During the Memorial Day holiday weekend of 2016, Disney Channel began to air many older DCOMs in a specialized marathon programming block in celebration of its 100th film, Adventures in Babysitting, starting off with the 51 most popular films airing over the four-day weekend from May 27, 2016 and concluding on June 24, 2016 with the premiere of the aforementioned 100th Disney Channel Original Movie.

From April 5 to May 24, 2021, Disney Channel hosted an eight-week event called "DCOM & Dessert", where a Disney Channel Original Movie would air every Monday night at 7:00 PM. Zombies 2 stars Ariel Martin and Chandler Kinney hosted this event and had their own baking segments where they would make interactive dessert recipes that families could make at home.

Disney previously made many of these films available for streaming on Disney+. However, in 2024 the company removed 20 DCOMs from the EMEA (Europe, Middle East and Africa) regional library.

== Disney Channel Premiere Films (1983–1997) ==
The Disney Channel Original Movie branding was not established until 1997. Prior to this the channel used the label "Disney Channel Premiere Films"; this was applied to the following 44 films.

Year	Film	Premiere date	Ref(s)
1983	Tiger Town	October 9, 1983	
1984	Gone Are the Dayes	May 1984	
1984	Love Leads the Way	October 7, 1984	
1985	Black Arrow	January 6, 1985	
1985	Lots of Luck	February 3, 1985	
1985	The Undergrads	May 5, 1985	
1985	The Blue Yonder	November 17, 1985	
1986	The Parent Trap II	July 26, 1986	
1986	Spot Marks the X	October 18, 1986	
1986	Down the Long Hills	November 15, 1986	
1987	Strange Companions	February 28, 1987 (Note: First aired in Canada on December 4, 1983.)	
1987	Anne of Avonlea: The Continuing Story of Anne of Green Gables	May 19, 1987	
1987	Not Quite Human	June 19, 1987	
1987	The Christmas Visitor (Note: Released in Australia as Bushfire Moon)	December 5, 1987	
1988	Save the Dog	March 19, 1988	
1988	The Night Train to Kathmandu	June 5, 1988	
1988	Ollie Hopnoodle's Haven of Bliss	August 6, 1988	
1988	A Friendship in Vienna	August 27, 1988	
1988	Good Old Boy	November 11, 1988	
1988	Goodbye, Miss 4th of July	December 3, 1988	
1989	Not Quite Human 2	September 23, 1989	
1990	Lantern Hill	January 27, 1990	
1990	Chips, the War Dog	March 24, 1990	
1990	Mother Goose Rock 'n' Rhyme	May 19, 1990	
1990	Back Home	June 7, 1990	
1990	The Little Kidnappers	August 17, 1990	
1990	Back to Hannibal: The Return of Tom Sawyer and Huckleberry Finn	October 21, 1990	
1991	Bejewelled	January 20, 1991	
1991	Perfect Harmony	March 31, 1991	
1991	Mark Twain and Me	November 22, 1991	
1992	Still Not Quite Human	May 31, 1992	
1993	The Ernest Green Story	January 17, 1993	
1993	Spies	March 7, 1993	
1993	Heidi	July 18, 1993	
1994	On Promised Land	April 17, 1994	
1994	The Whipping Boy	July 31, 1994	
1995	The Old Curiosity Shop	March 19, 1995	
1995	The Four Diamonds	August 12, 1995	
1996	The Little Riders	March 24, 1996	
1996	Nightjohn	June 1, 1996	
1996	Susie Q	October 3, 1996	
1996	Wish Upon a Star	November 12, 1996	
1997	The Paper Brigade	February 25, 1997	
1997	Northern Lights (Note: While some sources identify the 1997 film Northern Lights as the first Disney Channel Original Movie, it was not included in Disney Channel's 100 Original Movies celebration that aired in May–June 2016, and Disney Channel considers 1997's Under Wraps to be the first official Disney Channel Original Movie.)	August 23, 1997	

== Disney Channel Original Movies (1997–2022; 2025–present) ==
The following films were released during the original use of the label - starting with the channel rebrand in 1997, and running until its brief retirement in 2022. The network returned to the earlier label amid a general rebranding of the channel in 2025.

Year	Film	Premiere date	Ratings (millions)	Ref(s)
1997	Under Wraps	October 25, 1997	N/A	
1998	You Lucky Dog	June 27, 1998	N/A	
1998	Brink!	August 29, 1998	N/A	
1998	Halloweentown	October 17, 1998	3.4	
1999	Zenon: Girl of the 21st Century	January 23, 1999	N/A	
1999	Can of Worms	April 10, 1999	N/A	
1999	The Thirteenth Year	May 15, 1999	N/A	
1999	Smart House	June 26, 1999	N/A	
1999	Johnny Tsunami	July 24, 1999	N/A	
1999	Genius	August 21, 1999	N/A	
1999	Don't Look Under the Bed	October 9, 1999	N/A	
1999	Horse Sense	November 20, 1999	3.2	
2000	Up, Up, and Away	January 22, 2000	N/A	
2000	The Color of Friendship	February 5, 2000	N/A	
2000	Alley Cats Strike	March 18, 2000	N/A	
2000	Rip Girls	April 22, 2000	N/A	
2000	Miracle in Lane 2	May 13, 2000	N/A	
2000	Stepsister from Planet Weird	June 17, 2000	N/A	
2000	Ready to Run	July 14, 2000	N/A	
2000	Quints	August 18, 2000	N/A	
2000	The Other Me	September 8, 2000	N/A	
2000	Mom's Got a Date with a Vampire	October 13, 2000	N/A	
2000	Phantom of the Megaplex	November 10, 2000	N/A	
2000	The Ultimate Christmas Present	December 1, 2000	N/A	
2001	Zenon: The Zequel	January 12, 2001	3.7	
2001	Motocrossed	February 16, 2001	3.5	
2001	The Luck of the Irish	March 9, 2001	5.2	
2001	Hounded	April 13, 2001	3.6	
2001	Jett Jackson: The Movie	June 8, 2001	N/A	
2001	The Jennie Project	July 13, 2001	N/A	
2001	Jumping Ship	August 17, 2001	N/A	
2001	The Poof Point	September 14, 2001	N/A	
2001	Halloweentown II: Kalabar's Revenge	October 12, 2001	6.1	
2001	'Twas the Night	December 7, 2001	N/A	
2002	Double Teamed	January 18, 2002	5.0	
2002	Cadet Kelly	March 8, 2002	7.8	
2002	Tru Confessions	April 5, 2002	N/A	
2002	Get a Clue	June 28, 2002	3.2	
2002	Gotta Kick It Up!	July 26, 2002	N/A	
2002	A Ring of Endless Light	August 23, 2002	N/A	
2002	The Scream Team	October 4, 2002	N/A	
2003	You Wish!	January 10, 2003	N/A	
2003	Right on Track	March 21, 2003	N/A	
2003	The Even Stevens Movie	June 13, 2003	5.1	
2003	Eddie's Million Dollar Cook-Off	July 18, 2003	3.7	
2003	The Cheetah Girls	August 15, 2003	6.5	
2003	Full-Court Miracle	November 21, 2003	4.4	
2004	Pixel Perfect	January 16, 2004	3.9	
2004	Going to the Mat	March 19, 2004	3.9	
2004	Zenon: Z3	June 11, 2004	4.1	
2004	Stuck in the Suburbs	July 16, 2004	3.7	
2004	Tiger Cruise	August 6, 2004	3.8	
2004	Halloweentown High	October 8, 2004	6.1	
2005	Now You See It...	January 14, 2005	4.3	
2005	Buffalo Dreams	March 11, 2005	N/A	
2005	Kim Possible Movie: So the Drama	April 8, 2005	4.4	
2005	Go Figure	June 10, 2005	3.5	
2005	Life Is Ruff	July 15, 2005	4.3	
2005	The Proud Family Movie	August 19, 2005	4.8	
2005	Twitches	October 14, 2005	7.0	
2006	High School Musical	January 20, 2006	7.7	
2006	Cow Belles	March 24, 2006	5.8	
2006	Wendy Wu: Homecoming Warrior	June 16, 2006	5.7	
2006	Read It and Weep	July 21, 2006	5.6	
2006	The Cheetah Girls 2	August 25, 2006	7.8	
2006	Return to Halloweentown	October 20, 2006	7.5	
2007	Jump In!	January 12, 2007	8.2	
2007	Johnny Kapahala: Back on Board	June 8, 2007	1.8	
2007	High School Musical 2	August 17, 2007	17.2	
2007	Twitches Too	October 12, 2007	6.9	
2008	Minutemen	January 25, 2008	6.5	
2008	Camp Rock	June 20, 2008	8.9	
2008	The Cheetah Girls: One World	August 22, 2008	6.2	
2009	Dadnapped	February 16, 2009	4.6	
2009	Hatching Pete	April 24, 2009	4.1	
2009	Princess Protection Program	June 26, 2009	8.5	
2009	Wizards of Waverly Place: The Movie	August 28, 2009	11.4	
2010	Starstruck	February 14, 2010	6.0	
2010	Den Brother	August 13, 2010	3.7	
2010	Camp Rock 2: The Final Jam	September 3, 2010	7.9	
2010	Avalon High	November 12, 2010	3.8	
2011	The Suite Life Movie	March 25, 2011	5.2	
2011	Lemonade Mouth	April 15, 2011	7.1	
2011	Sharpay's Fabulous Adventure (Note: Sharpay's Fabulous Adventure was released on home video on April 19, 2011, but it aired on Disney Channel on May 22, 2011 as a Disney-branded "Disney Channel Original Movie".)	May 22, 2011	4.9	
2011	Phineas and Ferb the Movie: Across the 2nd Dimension	August 5, 2011	7.6	
2011	Geek Charming	November 11, 2011	4.9	
2011	Good Luck Charlie, It's Christmas!	December 2, 2011	6.9	
2012	Frenemies	January 13, 2012	4.2	
2012	Radio Rebel	February 17, 2012	4.3	
2012	Let It Shine	June 15, 2012	5.7	
2012	Girl vs. Monster	October 12, 2012	4.9	
2013	Teen Beach Movie	July 19, 2013	8.4	
2014	Cloud 9	January 17, 2014	5.0	
2014	Zapped	June 27, 2014	5.7	
2014	How to Build a Better Boy	August 15, 2014	4.6	
2015	Bad Hair Day	February 13, 2015	4.0	
2015	Teen Beach 2	June 26, 2015	5.8	
2015	Descendants	July 31, 2015	6.6	
2015	Invisible Sister	October 9, 2015	4.0	
2016	Adventures in Babysitting	June 24, 2016	3.4	
2016	The Swap	October 7, 2016	2.6	
2017	Tangled: Before Ever After (Note: While Tangled: Before Ever After effectively serves as the one-hour pilot to Tangled: The Series, it was advertised as a "Disney Channel Original Movie" by Disney Channel.)	March 10, 2017	2.9	
2017	Descendants 2	July 21, 2017	5.8	
2018	Zombies	February 16, 2018	2.6	
2018	Freaky Friday	August 10, 2018	1.6	
2019	Kim Possible	February 15, 2019	1.2	
2019	Descendants 3	August 2, 2019	4.6	
2020	Zombies 2	February 14, 2020	2.5	
2020	Upside-Down Magic	July 31, 2020	1.3	
2021	Spin	August 13, 2021	0.5	
2021	Under Wraps	October 1, 2021	0.4	
2021	Christmas...Again?!	December 3, 2021	0.5	
2022	Zombies 3 (Note: Zombies 3 was first released on Disney+ on July 15, 2022, but it aired on Disney Channel on August 12, 2022 as a "Lost Song" edition, while maintaining the "Disney Channel Original Movie" label.)	August 12, 2022	0.3	
2022	Under Wraps 2	September 25, 2022	0.3	
2025	Zombies 4: Dawn of the Vampires	July 10, 2025	0.6	
2026	Descendants: Wicked Wonderland	July 16, 2026	0.3	
2026	Camp Rock 3	August 13, 2026	TBA	

=== Upcoming films ===
Year	Film	Projected premiere	Ref(s)
2027	The Cheetah Girls: Next Gen	2027	
2027	Hidden Heroes: A Descendants Story	2027	
2027	Zombies 5: Secrets of the Sea	2027	
TBA	Untitled Phineas and Ferb film	TBA	
TBA	Halloweentown 5	TBA	

== Disney Original Movies (2023–2024) ==
A brief rebrand was in effect during this period, amid the rise of Disney+ and declining viewership of the channel. The DCOM moniker was set aside in favour of the "Disney Original Movie" label.

Year	Film	Premiere date	Ratings (millions)	Ref(s)
2023	Prom Pact (Note: Prom Pact was originally announced as a Disney+ original film, but it premiered on Disney Channel on March 30, 2023, under the "Disney Original Movie" branding.)	March 30, 2023	0.2	
2023	The Slumber Party	July 27, 2023	N/A	
2023	The Naughty Nine	November 22, 2023	0.3	
2024	Big City Greens the Movie: Spacecation	June 6, 2024	0.2	
2024	Descendants: The Rise of Red (Note: Descendants: The Rise of Red was first released on Disney+ on July 12, 2024, but it aired on Disney Channel on August 9, 2024, under the "Disney Original Movie" branding.)	August 9, 2024	N/A	

== Related films ==
The branding has at times been inconsistently applied in promotional material; this section lists some of those edge cases.

Films that did not originally premiere under the "Disney Channel Original Movie" label, but were later promoted as such:

- Harriet the Spy: Blog Wars (March 26, 2010)
- 16 Wishes (June 25, 2010)
- Back of the Net (June 15, 2019)
- The Curious Case of Dolphin Bay (June 11, 2022)

Films that were produced by Disney Channel, but premiered on Disney+ without the branding:

- Phineas and Ferb the Movie: Candace Against the Universe (August 28, 2020; premiered on Disney Channel on April 8, 2023)
- Secret Society of Second-Born Royals (September 25, 2020; premiered on Disney Channel on February 26, 2023)
- Sneakerella (May 13, 2022; premiered on Disney Channel on August 13, 2022)

Films based on Disney Channel shows or Disney Channel Original Movies, but premiered theatrically. Some later aired on the Disney Channel:

- The Lizzie McGuire Movie (May 2, 2003; premiered on Disney Channel on November 26, 2005)
- Hannah Montana and Miley Cyrus: Best of Both Worlds Concert (February 1, 2008; premiered on Disney Channel on July 26, 2008)
- High School Musical 3: Senior Year (October 24, 2008; premiered on Disney Channel on April 4, 2010)
- Hannah Montana: The Movie (April 10, 2009; premiered on Disney Channel on November 19, 2010)

Films that were not considered Disney Channel Original Movies in the United States but have been labeled as such elsewhere; often originating with the channel's international versions:

- Ice Princess (premiered theatrically on March 18, 2005)
- High School Musical: El desafío (Argentina) (premiered in Argentine theaters on July 17, 2008)
- High School Musical: El desafío (Mexico) (premiered in Mexico on September 5, 2008)
- Luck Luck Ki Baat (premiered on Disney Channel India on September 30, 2012)
- Bunks (broadcast on October 27, 2013, premiered on Disney XD on June 16, 2014)
- Pants on Fire (premiered on Disney XD on November 9, 2014)
- Mère et Fille: California Dream (premiered on Disney Channel France on February 5, 2016)

== Highest-rated Disney Channel Original Movie premieres ==
=== Top 10 ===
No.	Movie	Viewers (millions)	Year	Ref(s)
1	High School Musical 2	17.2	2007	
2	Wizards of Waverly Place: The Movie	11.4	2009	
3	Camp Rock	8.9	2008	
4	Princess Protection Program	8.5	2009	
5	Teen Beach Movie	8.4	2013	
6	Jump In!	8.2	2007	
7	Camp Rock 2: The Final Jam	7.9	2010	
8	Cadet Kelly	7.8	2002	
8	The Cheetah Girls 2	7.8	2006	
9	High School Musical	7.7	2006	
10	Phineas and Ferb the Movie: Across the 2nd Dimension	7.6	2011	

=== By calendar year ===
Year	Movie	Viewers (millions)	Ref(s)
2001	Halloweentown II: Kalabar's Revenge	6.1	
2002	Cadet Kelly	7.8	
2003	The Cheetah Girls	6.5	
2004	Halloweentown High	6.1	
2005	Twitches	7.0	
2006	The Cheetah Girls 2	7.8	
2007	High School Musical 2	17.2	
2008	Camp Rock	8.9	
2009	Wizards of Waverly Place: The Movie	11.4	
2010	Camp Rock 2: The Final Jam	7.9	
2011	Phineas and Ferb the Movie: Across the 2nd Dimension	7.6	
2012	Let It Shine	5.7	
2013	Teen Beach Movie	8.4	
2014	Zapped	5.7	
2015	Descendants	6.6	
2016	Adventures in Babysitting	3.4	
2017	Descendants 2	5.8	
2018	Zombies	2.6	
2019	Descendants 3	4.6	
2020	Zombies 2	2.5	
2021	Spin	0.5	
2022	Zombies 3	0.3	
2023	The Naughty Nine	0.3	
2024	Big City Greens the Movie: Spacecation	0.2	
2025	Zombies 4: Dawn of the Vampires	0.6	

== See also ==
- Disney Channel
- Disney XD
- Disney+
- List of Disney novelizations
- List of programs broadcast by Disney Channel
- List of programs broadcast by Disney XD
- List of Disney+ original films
