= Chandler Kinney =

American actress (born 2000)

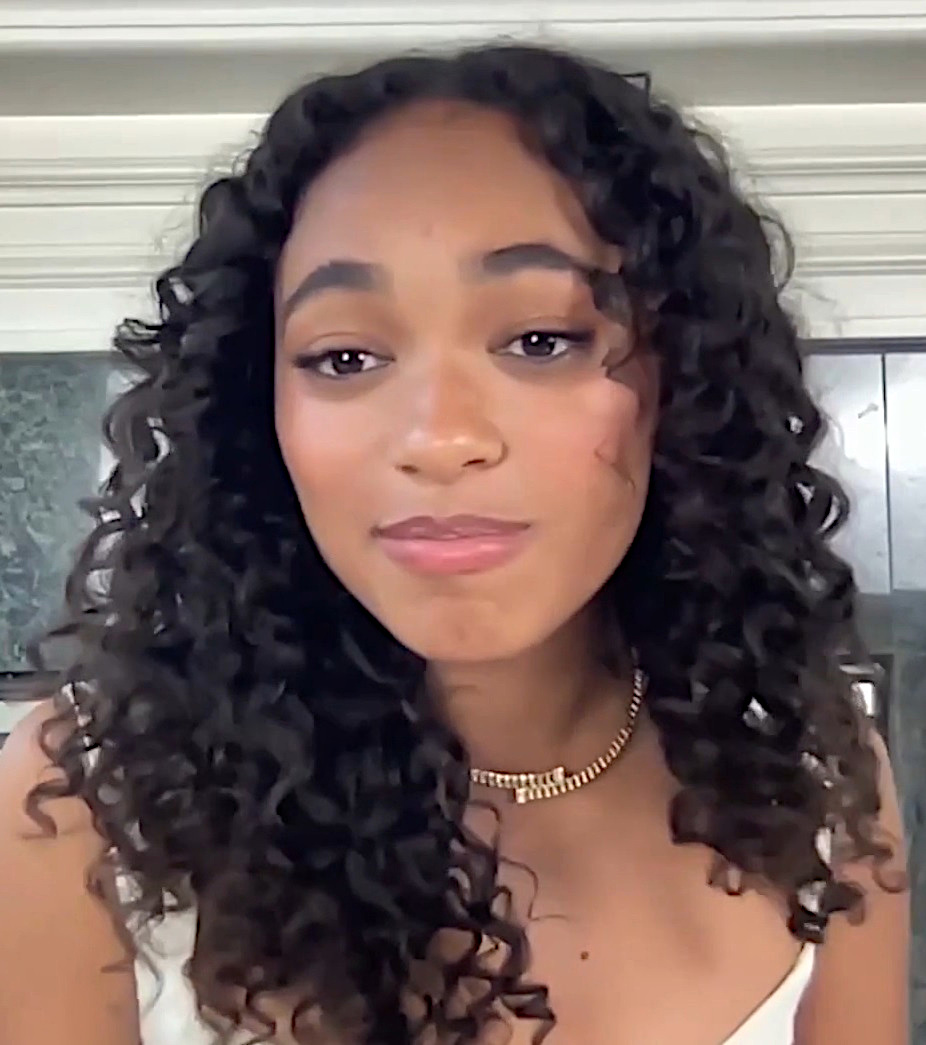
- Kinney in 2022
- Born: August 3, 2000 (age 26); Sacramento, California, U.S.
- Occupation: Actress
- Years active: 2012–present

Chandler Kinney (born August 3, 2000) is an American actress and singer. She gained recognition for her leading role as Willa in three films and other media for Disney's Zombies franchise (2020–2025). This breakthrough led to her competing in the 33rd season of Dancing with the Stars, in which she finished third.

Kinney played the lead role of teenaged cinephile Tabby Haworthe in the HBO Max horror series Pretty Little Liars (2022–2024), a spinoff of the eponymous original series, and starred in the Amazon Prime Video comedy drama series Elle (2026).

== Early life and education ==
Kinney was born on August 3, 2000, in Sacramento, California. She started dancing when she was three, and is trained in tap, jazz and hip-hop. She studied dance at the Debbie Allen Dance Academy. She began acting at age nine. She also has a black belt in martial arts.

Kinney and her mother founded the organization Chandler's Friends, which helps disadvantaged youths. She was homeschooled, and took a gap year before she studied at UCLA. She majored in psychology at UCLA, but left school to film Pretty Little Liars.

== Career ==
Throughout her early acting career, she had guest roles on the Disney Channel shows Girl Meets World and K.C. Undercover, and the Nickelodeon show The Haunted Hathaways. Her first major role was as Catherine Dillman in Gortimer Gibbon's Life on Normal Street. She then went on to star as Riana Murtaugh in Lethal Weapon. In 2020, she joined the Zombies franchise as Willa, a werewolf who first appears in Zombies 2.

In July 2021, Kinney was announced to be starring in Pretty Little Liars, a 2022 spinoff of the 2010 television series of the same name. It was announced she would be playing Tabby, an aspiring director and horror movie buff.

=== Dancing with the Stars ===
On September 4, 2024, Kinney was announced as a contestant on season 33 of Dancing with the Stars. She was partnered with professional dancer Brandon Armstrong. Earning both the highest cumulative points based on judges' scores and the first perfect score of the season, Kinney and Armstrong are the first Black partnership in Dancing with the Stars history to advance to the finale. Their freestyle routine was the show's first performance to feature an ensemble cast of all-Black dancers.

Week #	Dance / Song	Judges' scores					Result
Week #	Dance / Song	Inaba	Hough	Tonioli	Guest	Total	Result
1	Tango / "Hot to Go!"	8	7	8		23	No elimination
2	Rumba / "What Was I Made For?"	8	8	8		24	Safe
3	Cha-cha-cha / "It's Tricky"	9	9	9	9	36	No elimination
3	Jive / "We're Not Gonna Take It"	8	8	8	9	33	Safe
4	Contemporary / "I Hope You Dance"	8	8	8	8	32	Safe
5	Paso doble / "We Own the Night"; Team Freestyle / "I 2 I"	9; 9	9; 9	9; 9		27; 27	Safe
6	Viennese waltz / "Secret"	9	10	10		29	Safe
7	Argentine tango / "Para Te"; Instant Cha-cha-cha / "Apple"	10; 10	10; 10	10; 10		30; 30	Safe
8	Salsa / "Spicy Margarita"; Foxtrot / "Too Sweet"	10; 9	9; 10	10; 10		29; 29	No elimination
9	Jive / "APT"; Freestyle / "Hellzapoppin" & "Move On Up"	10; 10	10; 10	10; 10		30; 30	3rd place

Kinney and Armstrong ultimately finished in third place on November 26, 2024, behind runners-up Ilona Maher and her partner Alan Bersten, and winners Joey Graziadei and his partner Jenna Johnson.

== Filmography ==
=== Film ===
Year	Title	Role	Notes
2012	Battlefield America	Chantel	
2013	Company Town	Ally McKinley	Television movie
2020	Zombies 2	Willa Lykensen	Television movie
2022	Zombies 3	Willa Lykensen	Television movie
2025	Zombies 4: Dawn of the Vampires	Willa Lykensen	Television movie
TBD	Hidden Secrets 4: Back in Time	Mariah	Television movie, in production

=== Short films ===
Year	Title	Role	Notes
2020	Zombies 2: Wolf Tales	Willa Lykensen	Voice role
2020	Addison's Moonstone Mystery	Willa Lykensen	Voice role
2021	Zombies: Addison's Monster Mystery	Willa Lykensen	Voice role
2023	Zombies: The Re-Animated Series Shorts	Willa Lykensen	Voice role

=== Television ===
Year	Title	Role	Notes
2013	American Horror Story: Asylum	Older Julia	Episode: "Madness Ends"
2013	90210	Olivia	Episode: "You Can't Win Em All"
2014	The Haunted Hathaways	Mirabelle	6 episodes
2014–2016	Gortimer Gibbon's Life on Normal Street	Catherine Dillman	Main role
2015	Girl Meets World	Vanessa	Episode: "Girl Meets Texas: Part 2"
2016–2019	Lethal Weapon	Riana Murtaugh	Main role
2017	K.C. Undercover	Monique	2 episodes
2021	The Ghost and Molly McGee	Tammy Myers (voice)	Episode: "Howlin' Harriet/The (Un)natural"
2022	Robot Chicken	Buttercup, MJ, Animal Adoption Woman (voice)	Episode: "May Cause a Squeakquel"
2022–2024	Pretty Little Liars	Tabitha "Tabby" Haworthe	Main role
2024	Dancing with the Stars	Herself	3rd Place on season 33
2024	Zombies: The Re-Animated Series	Willa (voice)	Main role
2026	Elle	Kimberly	
TBD	Off Campus	Sabrina James	Season 3 beginning star (confirmation by production script)
