= Freya Skye discography =

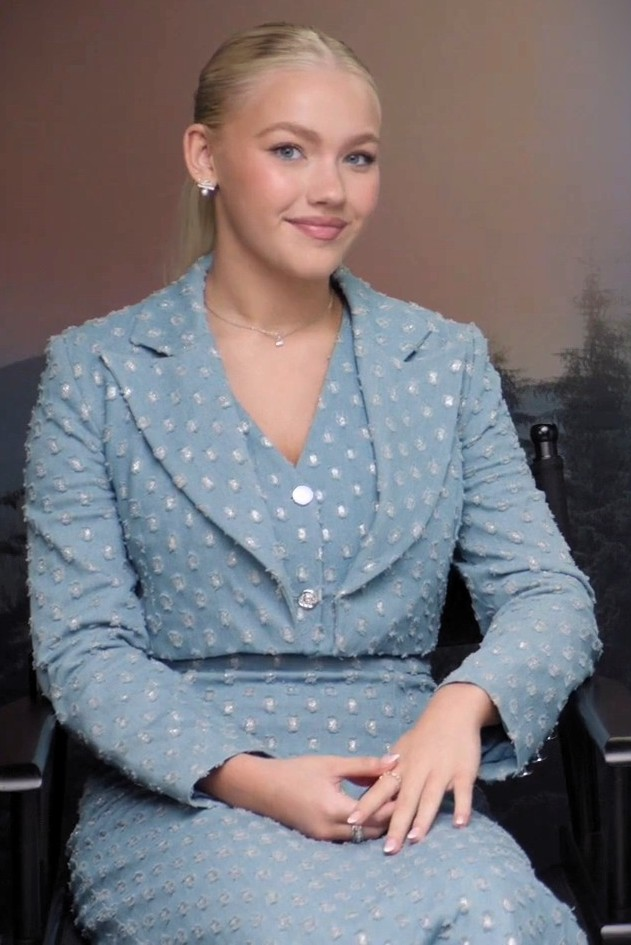
- Skye in 2025
- EPs: 1
- Soundtrack albums: 1
- Live albums: 1
- Compilation albums: 2
- Singles: 14
- Promotional singles: 5
- Music videos: 18

English singer and actress Freya Skye has released one extended play (EP), fourteen singles as lead artist, eighteen music videos, and has contributed to one live album, two compilation albums and one soundtrack album. She debuted in 2020 with the now-deleted single "Show Some Love" and represented the United Kingdom in Junior Eurovision Song Contest 2022, performing the song "Lose My Head" and placing fifth overall. She played Nova Bright in Zombies 4: Dawn of the Vampires and was featured on the soundtrack album of the name, also releasing three promotional singles for the album. In 2025 she embarked on the Descendants/Zombies: Worlds Collide Tour after recording the song "Worlds Collide" in collaboration with the other artists on that tour. Later that year she released her most successful song to date, "Silent Treatment", which was her first song to chart on the Billboard Hot 100, entering at number 88. In 2026, she released her first EP Stardust, and embarked on the Stars Align Tour.

== Albums ==
=== Soundtrack albums ===
- Zombies 4: Dawn of the Vampires

=== Live albums ===
- Disney Descendants/Zombies: Worlds Collide Tour - The Live Album

=== Compilation albums ===
- Junior Eurovision Song Contestant Yerevan 2022 (2022)
- Descendants/Zombies Worlds Collide Tour Official Playlist (2025)

== Extended plays ==
List of extended plays
Title	Details	Peak chart positions				
Title	Details	UK	AUS	BEL (FL)	SCO	US
Stardust	Released: 4 February 2026; Label: Hollywood; Format: CD, digital download, streaming, vinyl record	35	21	179	6	74

== Charted songs ==
List of charted songs, with selected chart positions, showing year released and album name
Title	Year	Peak chart positions												EP
Title	Year	UK	BEL (FL)	CAN CHR Top 40	CAN Hot AC	DEN Air.	GER Air.	NZ Hot	PRT Air.	US	US Adult Pop	US Pop	VEN Ang. Air.	EP
"Gold's Gone"	2025	— (Note: "Gold's Gone" did not enter the UK Singles Chart, but peaked at number 69 on the UK Singles Sales Chart.)	—	—	—	—	—	—	—	—	—	—	—	Non-album single
"Silent Treatment"	2025	—	19	18	37	7	—	21	37	88	32	14	9	Stardust
"London"	2026	—	—	—	—	—	—	31	—	—	—	—	—	Stardust (Bonus Track Edition)
"Bad Taste"	2026	73	—	—	—	—	78	19	28	—	—	—	—	Non-album singles
"—" denotes a recording that did not chart or was not released in that territory.														Non-album singles

== Singles ==
As lead artist
Year	Title	Album	Writer(s)	Producer(s)
2020	"Show Some Love"	Non-album singles	Unknown	Unknown
2021	"Famous"	Non-album singles	Unknown	Unknown
2021	"I Love the Way"	Non-album singles	Unknown	Unknown
2022	"Lose My Head"	Junior Eurovision Song Contest Yerevan 2022	Amber Van Day, Jack Hawitt, Falco Van Den Aker	Deepend
2024	"Who Says"	Non-album singles	Emanuel Kiriakou, Priscilla Hamilton	Lucky West
2024	"Walk Over"	Non-album singles	Priscilla Hamilton, Anne Preven, Scott Cutler	Simon Oscroft
2024	"Someone to Love"	Non-album singles	Ella Boh	Ella Boh
2024	"Winter Dream"	Non-album singles	Stephanie Jones, Andy Dodd	Lucky West
2025	"Can't Fake It"	Non-album singles	Freya Skye, Jacob Hazell, Katelyn Tarver, Svante Halldin	Jack & Coke
2025	"Who I Thought I Knew"	Non-album singles	Davin Kingston, Ella Boh, Freya Skye, Violet Skies	Ella Boh, Davin Kingston
2025	"Gold's Gone"	Non-album singles	Annie Schindel, Lucky West, Michelle Zarlenga	Lucky West
2025	"Gold's Gone (Descendants/Zombies: Worlds Collide Tour Version)"	Non-album singles	Annie Schindel, Lucky West, Michelle Zarlenga	Lucky West
2025	"Silent Treatment"	Stardust	Sophie Alexandra Tweed-Simmons, Freya Skye, Max Margolis	Max Margolis, J Moon
2026	"Bad Taste"	TBA	Annie Schindel, Andre Davidson, Bill Maybury, Sean Davidson, Freya Skye	The Monarch
2026	"Crushed"	TBA	TBA	TBA

== Promotional singles ==
Year	Title	Album	Label
2025	" The Place to Be "	Zombies 4: Dawn of the Vampires (Original Soundtrack)	Walt Disney Records
2025	"Don't Mess With Us"	Zombies 4: Dawn of the Vampires (Original Soundtrack)	Walt Disney Records
2025	"Worlds Collide"	Descendants/Zombies Worlds Collide Tour Official Playlist	Walt Disney Records
2025	"Snow Angels"	Non-album single	Walt Disney Records
2026	"2000 Miles" – Spotify Singles Holiday	Non-album single	Hollywood Records

== Other songs ==
Non-singles
Year	Title	Album(s)	Label(s)
2025	"Dream Come True (Intro)"	Zombies 4: Dawn of the Vampires (Original Soundtrack)	Walt Disney Records
2025	"Dream Come True"	Zombies 4: Dawn of the Vampires (Original Soundtrack)	Walt Disney Records
2025	"Kerosene"	Zombies 4: Dawn of the Vampires (Original Soundtrack)	Walt Disney Records
2025	"My Own Way"	Zombies 4: Dawn of the Vampires (Original Soundtrack)	Walt Disney Records
2025	"Possible"	Zombies 4: Dawn of the Vampires (Original Soundtrack)	Walt Disney Records
2025	"Show The World"	Zombies 4: Dawn of the Vampires (Original Soundtrack)	Walt Disney Records
2025	"Together As One"	Zombies 4: Dawn of the Vampires (Original Soundtrack)	Walt Disney Records
2026	"Petty"	Stardust	Hollywood Records
2026	"Golden Boy"	Stardust	Hollywood Records
2026	"Maybe Tomorrow"	Stardust	Hollywood Records
2026	"Why'd You Have to Call"	Stardust	Hollywood Records
2026	"London"	Stardust- Bonus Track Edition	Hollywood Records

== Videography ==
=== Music videos ===
As lead artist
Year	Title	Director	Notes
2022	Lose My Head	Sam Picone	For Junior Eurovision Song Contest 2022
2024	Walk Over	Lewis Cater	
2024	Someone to Love	Lewis Cater	
2024	Winter Dream	Lewis Cater	
2025	Can't Fake It	Boni Mata	
2025	Who I Thought I Knew	Boni Mata	
2025	Gold's Gone	Boni Mata	
2025	Gold's Gone (Descendants/Zombies:World's Collide Tour Version)	Unknown	A montage of live performances and behind-the-scenes footage.
2025	Snow Angels	Unknown	With Malachi Barton in promotion for Zombies 4
2025	Silent Treatment (tour diary)	Unknown	A montage of live performances and behind-the-scenes footage.
2026	silent treatment (Stars Align Tour: Live from London)	Jack Lightfoot	Recorded live performance.
2026	petty (Stars Align Tour: Live from London)	Jack Lightfoot	Recorded live performance.
2026	golden boy (Stars Align Tour: Live from London)	Jack Lightfoot	Recorded live performance.
2026	maybe tomorrow (Stars Align Tour: Live from London)	Jack Lightfoot	Recorded live performance.
2026	why'd you have to call (Stars Align Tour: Live from London)	Jack Lightfoot	Recorded live performance.
2026	london (Stars Align Tour: Live from London)	Jack Lightfoot	Recorded live performance.
2026	Bad Taste (Stars Align Tour: Live from Melbourne)	Jack Lightfoot	Recorded live performance.
2026	Bad Taste	Sophie Hall-Mochkatel	
