= Worlds Collide Concert Tour =

Disney movie franchise music concert tour

- Concert tours: 2
- Television specials: 1

The Worlds Collide Concert Tour is a series of touring concerts produced by Disney Concerts, a division of Disney Music Group, which is owned by The Walt Disney Company.

Launched in 2025, the shows feature various songs from Disney Channel films franchises, including Descendants, Zombies, and Camp Rock, performed by cast members from each franchises.

== Timeline of cast members ==
Cast members	Tours		Franchises
Cast members	Descendants/Zombies (2025)	Descendants/Zombies/Camp Rock (2026-27)	Franchises
Malachi Barton	Main	Main	Zombies / Camp Rock
Mekonnen Knife	Main	Main	Zombies
Dara Reneé	Main	Main	Descendants
Kylie Cantrall	Main		Descendants
Malia Baker	Main		Descendants
Joshua Colley	Main		Descendants
Freya Skye	Main		Zombies
Liamani	Guest (Note: Liamani was a guest performer during the show at the Honda Center in Anaheim, California, on July 22, 2025.)	Main	Descendants / Camp Rock
Swayam Bhatia		Main	Zombies
Hudson Stone		Main	Camp Rock
Kiara Romero		Main	Descendants
Alexandro Byrd		Main	Descendants

== Descendants/Zombies (2025) ==
Descendants/Zombies: Worlds Collide Tour
- Tour by Worlds Collide Concert Tour
- Promotional poster
- Location: North America
- Associated albums: Descendants: The Rise of Red; Zombies 4: Dawn of the Vampires
- Start date: July 17, 2025
- End date: September 16, 2025
- Legs: 1
- No. of shows: 43

The Descendants/Zombies: Worlds Collide Tour was the series first concert tour. Led by AEG Presents, the tour began on July 17, 2025, at the Pechanga Arena in San Diego, California, and concluded on September 16, 2025 at the Dickies Arena in Fort Worth, Texas, visiting cities in the United States and Canada throughout 43 dates. The dances were created by Chris Czunys.

A television special documenting the tour aired on February 19, 2026 on Disney Channel, while a live album was released the day after by Walt Disney Records.

=== Background ===
At the Disney Entertainment Showcase on August 9, 2024, held during the D23 Expo, Disney Branded Television, Disney Concerts, Disney Music Group, and AEG announced the Descendants/Zombies: Worlds Collide Tour, set for summer 2025. The tour brought together actors from both the Descendants and Zombies franchises, with appearances by the Descendants: The Rise of Red and Zombies 4: Dawn of the Vampires stars Kylie Cantrall, Malia Baker, Dara Reneé, Joshua Colley, Freya Skye, Malachi Barton, and Mekonnen Knife.

The tour was held in arenas across the United States and Canada, running from July 17 to September 16, 2025. On June 27, 2025, the cast of the tour released the single "Worlds Collide", with vocals from the cast.

=== Set list ===
Act I

1. "Worlds Collide" - Cast
2. "Red" - Kylie Cantrall
3. "The Place to Be" - Freya Skye & Malachi Barton
4. "Fired Up" / "Did I Mention" - Malachi Barton, Mekonnen Knife & Joshua Colley
5. "Rotten to the Core" / "BAMM" - Kylie Cantrall, Malia Baker, Joshua Colley, Malachi Barton, Mekonnen Knife & Freya Skye
6. "Perfect Revenge" / "What's My Name" - Dara Reneé & Joshua Colley
7. "Life Is Sweeter" - Cast
8. "Like the Zombies Do" / "Chillin' Like a Villain" - Cast
9. "Someday" / "Dream Come True" - Freya Skye & Malachi Barton
10. "Good to Be Bad" - Malia Baker & Mekonnen Knife
11. "Love Ain’t It" - Kylie Cantrall
12. "Flesh & Bone" / "It's Goin' Down" - Cast
13. "Imma Do It" - Dara Reneé
14. "B.O.Y." set (contains "See You Tonight", "Boy For A Day", "Denim" & "Goodie Bag") - Kylie Cantrall

Act II

1. "Gold’s Gone" - Freya Skye
2. "We Own the Night" - Dara Reneé
3. "Call to the Wild" - Dara Reneé, Joshua Colley & Mekonnen Knife
4. "Don't Mess With Us" - Freya Skye & Malachi Barton
5. "Ways to Be Wicked" - Kylie Cantrall, Joshua Colley, Malia Baker & Mekonnen Knife
6. "Queen of Mean" - Dara Reneé
7. "Alien Invasion" - Cast
8. "If Only" - Malia Baker
9. "Space Between" - Kylie Cantrall & Malia Baker
10. "Night Falls" - Cast
11. "My Own Way" - Freya Skye
12. "Shuffle of Love" - Malachi Barton, Joshua Colley & Mekonnen Knife
13. "I’m Gonna Remember This" - Joshua Colley
14. "Legends in the Making" - Cast
15. "Set It Off" - Cast

==== Special guests ====
- July 22, 2025 (Honda Center, Anaheim, California): Liamani performed "One Kiss" during the concert, while Rita Ora joined Kylie Cantrall to perform "Love Ain't It" during the "VIP experience".
- August 21, 2025 (Madison Square Garden, Manhattan, New York): Chandler Kinney joined Kylie Cantrall to introduce "We Own the Night".
- August 23, 2025 (UBS Arena, Elmont, New York) : Milo Manheim and Meg Donnelly joined Freya Skye and Malachi Barton to perform "Someday".

=== Shows ===
List of 2025 concerts
Date (2025)	City	Country	Venue
July 17	San Diego	United States	Pechanga Arena
July 19	San Jose	United States	SAP Center
July 20	Sacramento	United States	Golden 1 Center
July 22	Anaheim	United States	Honda Center
July 23	Los Angeles	United States	Crypto.com Arena
July 25	Phoenix	United States	PHX Arena
July 26	Paradise (Note: Labelled as Las Vegas in promotional material)	United States	T-Mobile Arena
July 28	Denver	United States	Ball Arena
July 30	Oklahoma City	United States	Paycom Center
August 1	Kansas City	United States	T-Mobile Center
August 2	St. Louis	United States	Enterprise Center
August 4	Minneapolis	United States	Target Center
August 5	Milwaukee	United States	Fiserv Forum
August 6	Rosemont	United States	Allstate Arena
August 8	Indianapolis	United States	Gainbridge Fieldhouse
August 9	Louisville	United States	KFC Yum! Center
August 10	Cincinnati	United States	Heritage Bank Center
August 12	Columbus	United States	Schottenstein Center
August 13	Cleveland	United States	Rocket Arena
August 14	Pittsburgh	United States	PPG Paints Arena
August 16	Toronto	Canada	Scotiabank Arena
August 17	Detroit	United States	Little Caesars Arena
August 19	Buffalo	United States	KeyBank Center
August 20	Philadelphia	United States	Xfinity Mobile Arena
August 21	New York City	United States	Madison Square Garden
August 23	Elmont (Note: Labelled as Belmont Park in promotional material)	United States	UBS Arena
August 24	Newark	United States	Prudential Center
August 25	Boston	United States	TD Garden
August 27	Baltimore	United States	CFG Bank Arena
August 29	Charlottesville	United States	John Paul Jones Arena
August 30	Greensboro	United States	First Horizon Coliseum
August 31	Raleigh	United States	Lenovo Center
September 2	Atlanta	United States	State Farm Arena
September 3	Nashville	United States	Bridgestone Arena
September 5	Tampa	United States	Benchmark International Arena
September 6	Sunrise	United States	Amerant Bank Arena
September 7	Orlando	United States	Kia Center
September 9	Jacksonville	United States	VyStar Veterans Memorial Arena
September 11	Birmingham	United States	Legacy Arena
September 12	New Orleans	United States	Smoothie King Center
September 14	Houston	United States	Toyota Center
September 15	Austin	United States	Moody Center
September 16	Fort Worth	United States	Dickies Arena

== Descendants/Zombies/Camp Rock (2026-27) ==
Descendants/Zombies/Camp Rock: Worlds Collide Concert Tour
- Tour by Worlds Collide Concert Tour
- Promotional poster
- Location: North America; Europe
- Associated albums: Descendants: Wicked Wonderland; Camp Rock 3
- Start date: September 25, 2026
- End date: February 24, 2027
- Legs: 2
- No. of shows: 56

The Descendants/Zombies/Camp Rock: Worlds Collide Concert Tour is the series second concert tour. Led by AEG Presents, the tour began on September 25, 2026, at the Acrisure Arena in Palm Desert, California, and is set to conclude on February 24, 2027 at the Movistar Arena in Madrid, Spain, visiting cities in North America and Europe throughout 56 dates.

=== Background ===
On March 18, 2026, AEG and Disney announced tour dates for a new Worlds Collide Concert Tour, which will began on September 25, 2026, at Acrisure Arena in Palm Desert, California, and was set to finish at the Moody Center in Austin on December 4, 2026, at a total of 45 arenas across North America. In addition to Descendants and Zombies, the 2026 tour include Camp Rock. The lineup includes Malachi Barton, Dara Reneé and Mekonnen Knife, who were all a part of the 2025 tour, as well as Liamani Segura, Hudson Stone, Swayam Bhatia, Kiara Romero, and Alexandro Byrd. On June 9, 2026, 11 additional tour dates in the UK and Europe were announced, beginning in Dublin on February 6, 2027.

==== Special guests ====
- September 28, 2026 (Crypto.com Arena, Los Angeles, California): The cast of Coven Academy (Jordan Leftwich, Ora Duplass, Louis Thresher, Malina Weissman, Devon Sawa, and Nathaniel Logan McIntyre) joined Malachi Barton & Swayam Bhatia to introduce "Queen of Mean".
- November 7, 2026 (Barclays Center, Brooklyn, New York): Trevor Tordjman joined Mekonnen Knife as Shrimpy during "Fired Up".

=== Shows ===
List of 2026 concerts
Date (2026)	City	Country	Venue
September 25	Palm Desert	United States	Acrisure Arena
September 26	Phoenix	United States	Mortgage Matchup Center
September 28	Los Angeles	United States	Crypto.com Arena
September 30	Inglewood (Note: Labelled as Los Angeles in promotional material)	United States	Kia Forum
October 1	Anaheim	United States	Honda Center
October 3	San Francisco	United States	Chase Center
October 4	Sacramento	United States	Golden 1 Center
October 6	Portland	United States	Moda Center
October 8	Vancouver	Canada	Rogers Arena
October 10	Tacoma (Note: Labelled as Seattle in promotional material)	United States	Tacoma Dome
October 11	Spokane	United States	Numerica Veterans Arena
October 13	Boise	United States	ExtraMile Arena
October 14	Salt Lake City	United States	Delta Center
October 15	Denver	United States	Ball Arena
October 17	Kansas City	United States	T-Mobile Center
October 18	Minneapolis	United States	Target Center
October 19	Chicago	United States	United Center
October 21	Rosemont (Note: Labelled as Chicago in promotional material)	United States	Allstate Arena
October 22	Cincinnati	United States	Heritage Bank Center
October 23	Detroit	United States	Little Caesars Arena
October 25	Cleveland	United States	Rocket Arena
October 27	Indianapolis	United States	Gainbridge Fieldhouse
October 28	Pittsburgh	United States	PPG Paints Arena
October 30	Ottawa	Canada	Canadian Tire Centre
November 1	Toronto	Canada	Scotiabank Arena
November 3	Boston	United States	TD Garden
November 4	Worcester	United States	DCU Center
November 6	Hartford	United States	PeoplesBank Arena
November 7	New York City (Note: Labelled as Brooklyn in promotional material)	United States	Barclays Center
November 8	Elmont (Note: Labelled as Belmont Park in promotional material)	United States	UBS Arena
November 10	Newark	United States	Prudential Center
November 11	Newark	United States	Prudential Center
November 13	Philadelphia	United States	Xfinity Mobile Arena
November 14	Baltimore	United States	CFG Bank Arena
November 16	Charlottesville	United States	John Paul Jones Arena
November 17	Washington, D.C.	United States	Capital One Arena
November 19	Charlotte	United States	Spectrum Center
November 20	Greensboro	United States	First Horizon Coliseum
November 22	Nashville	United States	Bridgestone Arena
November 24	Sunrise	United States	Amerant Bank Arena
November 25	Orlando	United States	Kia Center
November 28	Tampa	United States	Benchmark International Arena
November 30	Atlanta	United States	State Farm Arena
December 2	Houston	United States	Toyota Center
December 3	Dallas	United States	American Airlines Center
December 4	Austin	United States	Moody Center

List of 2027 concerts
Date (2027)	City	Country	Venue
February 6	Dublin	Ireland	3Arena
February 9	Glasgow	Scotland	OVO Hydro
February 10	Manchester	England	AO Arena
February 12	Birmingham	England	bp pulse LIVE
February 13	Liverpool	England	M&S Bank Arena
February 15	London	England	The O_{2} Arena
February 16	London	England	The O_{2} Arena
February 18	Cologne	Germany	Lanxess Arena
February 19	Amsterdam	Netherlands	Ziggo Dome
February 21	Paris	France	Accor Arena
February 24	Madrid	Spain	Movistar Arena

=== Cancelled shows ===
List of cancelled concerts, showing date, city, country, venue, reason for cancellation and reference
Date	City	Country	Venue	Reason	Ref.
October 31, 2026	Hamilton	Canada	TD Coliseum	Low ticket sales	
December 8, 2026	Monterrey	Mexico	Arena Monterrey	Low ticket sales	
December 11, 2026	Guadalajara	Mexico	Arena Guadalajara	Low ticket sales	
December 13, 2026	Mexico City	Mexico	Arena CDMX	Low ticket sales	

== See also ==
- Descendants (franchise)
- Zombies (franchise)
- Camp Rock 3
