= Alex Sampson =

Canadian singer-songwriter (born 2004)

- Born: January 20, 2004 (age 22); Atikokan, Ontario, Canada
- Genre: Pop
- Years active: 2019–present
- Label: Warner
- Website: www.alexsampsonmusic.com

Alex Darren Sampson (born 20 January 2004) is a Canadian singer and songwriter, best known for finishing as a semi-finalist on the 19th season of America's Got Talent. His sophomore EP Hopeless Romantic (2024) was released by Warner Music Group, and featured his single "Pretty Baby". He was featured on People magazine's "Emerging Artists" list in 2023.

== Career ==
=== Breakout and Warner Records ===
In 2023, Sampson signed with Warner Records, which released several singles. One was "Want You!", the lead single from his first EP, Blurry Vision, which Warner released on January 19, 2024. He also signed a publishing deal with Sony ATV.

Sampson then appeared in summer 2024 on the 19th season of America's Got Talent where he performed original songs including his doo-wop-inspired ballad "Pretty Baby" as well as "If You Were My Girl" and "Wallflower", reaching the semifinals. He became known at this time for a retro-pop style that harked back to the 1950s and '60s. AGT judge Howie Mandel called him "a cross between Shawn Mendes and Chris Isaak." Sampson later focused on a more contemporary pop style.

Warner Records released Sampson's second EP, Hopeless Romantic, in September 2024.

=== 2024–present ===
In November and December 2024, Sampson toured North America opening for Alexander Stewart, and in 2025 supporting Jamie Miller in North America and Europe.

His first headlining tour, titled Thank You for Loving Me, took place in early 2026 supported by opening act Maryjo Young.

Sampson starred in Silver Jeans Co.'s spring 2026 fashion campaign.

== Discography ==
=== Extended plays ===
List of EPs, with selected details
Title	Details
Hopeless Romantic	Released: September 27, 2024; Label: Warner Records; Format: digital
Growing Pains	Released: June 5, 2026; Label: Warner Records; Format: digital

=== Charted singles ===
List of charted singles, with selected chart positions, showing year released and album name
Title	Year	Peak chart positions	Album
Title	Year	CAN	Album
"Misery"	2026	51	Growing Pains

== Tours ==
=== Headlining ===
- Nonstop Flight Tour (2027)

=== Opening act ===
- Freya Skye – Stars Align Tour (2026)
