= Zombies 4: Dawn of the Vampires (soundtrack) =

Soundtrack album by Zombies cast
- Released: July 11, 2025
- Recorded: 2024
- Genre: Pop
- Length: 36:37
- Label: Walt Disney

Zombies soundtracks chronology
Zombies 3 (2022)	Zombies 4: Dawn of the Vampires (2025)

Singles from Zombies 4: Dawn of the Vampires
- 1. "The Place to Be" Released: May 2, 2025; 2. "Don't Mess with Us" Released: June 13, 2025

Zombies 4: Dawn of the Vampires is a soundtrack album by the cast of the film of the same name, that released on July 11, 2025, by Walt Disney Records. The soundtrack was announced on May 2, 2025, with the release of the lead single "The Place to Be". Another single, "Don't Mess with Us" was released on June 13, 2025.

== Background ==
The soundtrack was released on July 11, 2025, to coincide with the release of its parent film. The soundtrack consists of 13 songs, with 11 of them originating from the film. It includes new renditions of "Someday" from Zombies and "Ain't No Doubt About It" from Zombies 3.

== Singles ==
"The Place to Be", performed by Milo Manheim, Meg Donnelly, Freya Skye, Malachi Barton, Swayam Bhatia, Julian Lerner, and Mekonnen Knife was released as a single on May 2, 2025, along with the pre-order of the soundtrack. "Don't Mess with Us", performed by Manheim, Donnelly, Skye, Barton, Bhatia, Lerner, and Knife was released as a single on June 13, 2025.

== Commercial performance ==
Luminate, which tracks streaming performance in the US, reported that in the week ending July 17, the Zombies 4: Dawn of the Vampires soundtrack earned nearly 12,500 equivalent album units in the United States, with streaming accounting for the majority of activity. The album garnered 15.17 million on-demand official streams, ranking as the third-most-streamed soundtrack of the week. Within ten days of release, it accumulated 30 million global audio streams—20 million on Spotify, 9 million on Apple Music, and 11 million on Amazon Music—totaling over 15 million hours of music streamed. On YouTube, listeners consumed more than 900,000 hours of videos related to the soundtrack. The album also debuted at No. 1 on the Billboard Kid Albums chart, No. 3 on the Soundtracks chart, and No. 90 on the overall Billboard 200.

== Track listing ==
No.	Title	Writer(s)	Performer(s)	Length
1.	"Legends in the Making"	Doug Rockwell; Tova Litvin	Milo Manheim; Meg Donnelly; Chandler Kinney; Kylee Russell	2:59
2.	"The Place to Be"	Mitch Allan; Chantry Johnson; Michelle Zarlenga	Manheim; Donnelly; Freya Skye; Malachi Barton; Swayam Bhatia; Julian Lerner; Mekonnen Knife	3:24
3.	"Dream Come True" (Intro)	Jaheem King Toombs; Matthew Edward Martinez	Skye; Barton	0:34
4.	"Don't Mess with Us"	Allan; Johnson; Zarlenga	Manheim; Donnelly; Kinney; Russell; Skye; Barton; Bhatia; Lerner; Knife	3:33
5.	"Dream Come True"	Toombs; Martinez	Skye; Barton	3:18
6.	"Kerosene"	Antonina Armato; Tim James Price; Adam Schmalholz; Thomas Armato Sturges	Manheim; Donnelly; Kinney; Russell; Skye; Barton; Bhatia; Lerner; Knife	3:21
7.	"My Own Way"	Josh Cumbee; Jordan Powers	Skye	3:11
8.	"Possible"	Armato; James Price; Schmalholz; Armato Sturges	Manheim; Donnelly; Kinney; Russell; Skye; Barton; Bhatia; Lerner; Knife	3:46
9.	"Someday" (Reprise)	Dustin Burnett; Paula Winger	Manheim; Donnelly	0:42
10.	"Show the World"	Matthew Tishler; Shridhar Solanki	Manheim; Donnelly; Kinney; Russell; Skye; Barton; Bhatia; Lerner; Knife	2:58
11.	"Ain't No Doubt About It" (Reprise)	Cumbee; Powers	Manheim; Donnelly	1:26
12.	"Together as One"	Mohamed Alitou; Tim Boonsma; Mila Branger; Gustavo Branger; Louis Knight-Surie	Donnelly; Kinney; Russell; Skye; Barton; Bhatia; Lerner; Knife	2:22
13.	"Score Suite"	Tom Howe	Tom Howe	5:05

== Charts ==
Chart performance for Zombies 4: Dawn of the Vampires
Chart (2025)	Peak position
Australian Albums (ARIA)	74
Belgian Albums (Ultratop Flanders)	98
UK Compilation Albums (Official Charts)	5
UK Soundtrack Albums (Official Charts)	26
US Billboard 200	90
US Independent Albums (Billboard)	16
US Top Soundtracks (Billboard)	3
US Kid Albums (Billboard)	1

Year-end chart performance for Zombies 4: Dawn of the Vampires
Chart (2025)	Peak position
US Top Soundtracks (Billboard)	24
US Kid Albums (Billboard)	12
