= Stardust (EP) =

EP by Freya Skye
- Released: 4 February 2026
- Length: 15:42
- Label: Hollywood

Singles from Stardust
- 1. "Silent Treatment" Released: 2 December 2025

Stardust is the debut extended play by English singer-songwriter and actress Freya Skye. The single, "Silent Treatment", was released on the 2 of December 2025.

== Background ==
Previously Skye had participated in Junior Eurovision 2022 representing the United Kingdom. She won the public vote and finished fifth overall.

In the summer, Zombies 4: Dawn of the Vampires was released and Skye starred in the Descendants/Zombies: Worlds Collide Tour, part of the Descendants and Zombies franchises, running from 17 July to 16 September.

In 2025, Skye released the singles "Can't Fake It", "Who I Thought I Knew" and "Gold's Gone". In October 2025, Skye announced her first solo set of shows, Freya Skye: The Acoustic Shows, with four shows across Los Angeles, New York and London, that took place from December 2025 to January 2026.

On 27 January 2026, Skye announced her first EP, Stardust, which was released on 4 February 2026.

== Writing and recording ==
Skye worked on Stardust with songwriters and producers including Julia Michaels, Mattman & Robin, and Johan Carlsson. On the EP's title Skye commented, "The meaning just came to it being the songs on the EP are the 'stardust.' They're a bit broken when they're separated and they're a bit messy, very honest, but then when you put it together, it tells the full story. It just felt perfect."

== Music and lyrics ==
"Silent Treatment" is the first track, being described as combining an "up-tempo acoustic guitar with glossy pop synths" like the style of pop icons like Taylor Swift. Tracks like "Petty" have contemporary pop hooks and energetic production reminiscent of Charli XCX, while "Golden Boy" is seen as a pop rock ballad with a cathartic chorus. Overall, the EP has been described as mainstream pop with acoustic and synth pop influences.

== Promotion and release ==
The EP was officially released on 4 February 2026. It was available on digital download and streaming. On 15 May 2026 it was released as a CD and a vinyl record.

=== Singles ===
In December 2025, "Silent Treatment" was released as the EP's lead single. All the songs on the EP had a music video which was recorded live and were directed by Jack Lightfoot. The lead single "Silent Treatment" charted in multiple countries notably in the US, Canada, and New Zealand. Its best chart position was number 7 in Denmark.

A special edition vinyl was also put on sale, which included another single called "London". "London" charted in New Zealand.

=== Marketing ===
Freya Skye performed "Silent Treatment" on The Kelly Clarkson Show on 27 February 2026. Multiple clothing articles and accessories related to the EP were put on sale on her website. The EP was also released as a vinyl and a CD on her website.

=== Tour ===
To promote the EP Skye announced the Stars Align Tour. She announced the first fifteen dates of the tour via social media on 8 December 2025. The tour commenced on 6 February 2026 in Portland, Oregon, United States, and will conclude on 28 November 2026 in Lisbon, Portugal.

== Commercial performance ==
=== Oceania ===
The singles "Silent Treatment" and "London" reached number 21 and 31 respectively in New Zealand. The EP itself reached number 21 on the Australian ARIA Albums Chart.

=== United States ===
"Silent treatment", the EP's lead single, appeared in multiple charts including the US Billboard Hot 100, her first and only song to date to appear on the chart. The EP itself reached number 74 on the US Billboard 200, and reached number 11 on the US Billboard Independent Albums.

=== Europe ===
In Europe the EP appeared on multiple charts and saw moderate success but better than its performance in the US. It reached number 77 on the UK Album Downloads Chart, number 35 on the UK Albums Chart,, number 179 on the Belgian Ultratop albums chart, and its best position on any chart to date, number 6 on the Scottish Albums Chart.

== Track listing ==
Stardust track listing
No.	Title	Writer(s)	Producers	Length
1.	"Silent Treatment"	Freya Skye; Sophie Alexandra Tweed-Simmons; Max Margolis	Margolis; J Moon	2:22
2.	"Petty"	Skye; Jay Mooncie; Bava	Moon	2:53
3.	"Golden Boy"	Skye; Nick Lopez; Emily Beihold; Jason Suwito	Suwito	3:17
4.	"Maybe Tomorrow"	Skye; Mooncie; Lopez; Beihold	Moon	2:56
5.	"Why'd You Have to Call"	Skye; Julia Michaels; Mattias Larsson; Robin Fredriksson	Mattman & Robin	4:14
Total length:				15:42

Physical release and digital special edition bonus track
No.	Title	Writer(s)	Producers	Length
6.	"London"	Skye; Tweed-Simmons; Johan Carlsson; Ross Golan	Carlsson	3:20
Total length:				19:02

=== Notes ===
- All the tracks are stylised in lowercase.

== Charts ==
Chart performance for Stardust
Chart (2026)	Peak position
Australian Albums (ARIA)	21
Belgian Albums (Ultratop Flanders)	179
Scottish Albums (Official Charts)	6
UK Albums (Official Charts)	35
US Billboard 200	74
US Independent Albums (Billboard)	11

== Release history ==
Stardust release dates and formats
Region	Date	Formats	Edition	Label	Ref.
Various	4 February 2026	Digital download; streaming	Standard	Hollywood	
Various	15 May 2026	CD; vinyl record	Special	Hollywood	
Various	29 May 2026	Digital download; streaming	Special	Hollywood	
