= Stars Align Tour =

2026–2027 concert tour by Freya Skye

- Tour by Freya Skye
- Location: Europe; North America; Oceania; South America; Asia
- Associated album: Stardust
- Start date: 6 February 2026
- End date: 22 February 2027
- No. of shows: 73
- Supporting acts: Adrian Lyles; Alex Sampson; Jack Gray

Freya Skye concert chronology
- The Acoustic Shows (2025–2026); Stars Align Tour (2026–2027)

Stars Align Tour is the debut solo headlining concert tour by the English singer Freya Skye, in support of her debut EP, Stardust (2026). The tour commenced on 6 February 2026 in Portland, United States, and will conclude on 22 February 2027 in New Taipei City, Taiwan.

== Background ==
Following the success of her acoustic shows selling out, Skye announced the first fifteen dates of the tour via social media on 8 December 2025 with the caption, "I'M GOING ON TOUR!!!". On 15 January 2026 she announced the first set of UK dates. On 25 January 2026, she announced Adrian Lyles as her opening act for Leg 1. On 4 February 2026, Skye released her debut extended play Stardust. On 19 February, she announced Oceania, Europe and more dates in the UK and North America. During the presale, Skye added seven more Europe dates and upgraded some of her Australian venues. On 2 June 2026, it was announced that Jack Gray would be the opener for Leg 2 and Alex Sampson for Leg 3. In September 2026, the Latin American and Asian legs of the tour was announced for early 2027.

== Set list ==
The following set list was performed during the 6 March 2026 show at O_{2} Forum Kentish Town in London, England, during the tour's first leg. It is not representative of all tour dates.

1. "Can't Fake It"
2. "Petty"
3. "Walk Over"
4. "Why'd You Have to Call?"
5. "Bad Taste"
6. "Who I Thought I Knew"
7. "London"
8. "Maybe Tomorrow"
9. "Someone to Love"
10. "Golden Boy"
11. "Lose My Head"
12. "My Own Way"
13. "Silent Treatment"
  Encore
14. "Gold's Gone"

== Tour dates ==
List of 2026 concerts
Date (2026)	City	Country	Venue	Supporting acts
6 February	Portland	United States	Roseland Theater	Adrian Lyles
7 February	Seattle	United States	Paramount Theatre	Adrian Lyles
10 February	Los Angeles	United States	The Wiltern	Adrian Lyles
11 February	Anaheim	United States	House of Blues	Adrian Lyles
12 February	Oakland	United States	Fox Westwood Village Theater	Adrian Lyles
14 February	Salt Lake City	United States	The Complex	Adrian Lyles
15 February	Denver	United States	Mission Ballroom	Adrian Lyles
17 February	Minneapolis	United States	The Fillmore	Adrian Lyles
18 February	Chicago	United States	The Salt Shed	Adrian Lyles
20 February	Washington, D.C.	United States	The Anthem	Adrian Lyles
21 February	Philadelphia	United States	The Fillmore	Adrian Lyles
24 February	Detroit	United States	The Fillmore Detroit	Adrian Lyles
25 February	Toronto	Canada	Massey Hall	Adrian Lyles
27 February	Boston	United States	House of Blues	Adrian Lyles
28 February	New York City	United States	Hammerstein Ballroom	Adrian Lyles
3 March	Birmingham	England	O_{2} Academy	Adrian Lyles
5 March	London	England	O_{2} Forum Kentish Town	Adrian Lyles
6 March	London	England	O_{2} Forum Kentish Town	Adrian Lyles
8 March	Manchester	England	O_{2} Victoria Warehouse	Adrian Lyles
7 June	Brisbane	Australia	Fortitude Music Hall	Jack Gray
9 June	Sydney	Australia	Hordern Pavilion	Jack Gray
11 June	Melbourne	Australia	Margaret Court Arena	Jack Gray
14 June	Auckland	New Zealand	Kiri Te Kanawa Theatre	Jack Gray
19 September	Santa Barbara	United States	Santa Barbara Bowl	Alex Sampson
20 September	San Diego	United States	Cal Coast Credit Union Open Air Theatre	Alex Sampson
22 September	Phoenix	United States	Arizona Financial Theatre	Alex Sampson
24 September	Austin	United States	Moody Amphitheater	Alex Sampson
26 September	Houston	United States	713 Music Hall	Alex Sampson
27 September	Irving	United States	The Pavilion at Toyota Music Factory	Alex Sampson
29 September	Kansas City	United States	Midland Theatre	Alex Sampson
30 September	Milwaukee	United States	Landmark Credit Union Live	Alex Sampson
2 October	St. Louis	United States	The Factory	Alex Sampson
3 October	Cincinnati	United States	Andrew J. Brady Music Center	Alex Sampson
5 October	Nashville	United States	The Truth	Alex Sampson
6 October	Columbus	United States	KEMBA Live!	Alex Sampson
7 October	Pittsburgh	United States	Citizens Live	Alex Sampson
9 October	Bridgeport	United States	Hartford HealthCare Amphitheater	Alex Sampson
10 October	Montclair	United States	Wellmont Theater	Alex Sampson
12 October	Cumberland (Note: Labelled as Atlanta in promotional material.)	United States	Coca-Cola Roxy	Alex Sampson
13 October	Orlando	United States	House of Blues	Alex Sampson
14 October	Hollywood	United States	Hard Rock Live	Alex Sampson
25 October	Dublin	Ireland	3Olympia	Alex Sampson
26 October	Dublin	Ireland	3Olympia	Alex Sampson
29 October	Manchester	England	Aviva Studios	Alex Sampson
30 October	Manchester	England	Aviva Studios	Alex Sampson
1 November	Wolverhampton	England	Wolverhampton Civic Hall	Alex Sampson
2 November	Wolverhampton	England	Wolverhampton Civic Hall	Alex Sampson
4 November	Leeds	England	O_{2} Academy Leeds	Alex Sampson
5 November	Glasgow	Scotland	O_{2} Academy Glasgow	Alex Sampson
6 November	Cardiff	Wales	University Great Hall	Alex Sampson
8 November	London	England	O_{2} Brixton Academy	Alex Sampson
9 November	London	England	O_{2} Brixton Academy	Alex Sampson
13 November	Paris	France	Salle Pleyel	Alex Sampson
14 November	Amsterdam	Netherlands	Gashouder	Alex Sampson
16 November	Antwerp	Belgium	Trix	Alex Sampson
18 November	Brussels	Belgium	La Madeleine	Alex Sampson
19 November	Berlin	Germany	Uber Eats Music Hall	Alex Sampson
22 November	Cologne	Germany	Carlswerk Victoria	Alex Sampson
23 November	Cologne	Germany	Carlswerk Victoria	Alex Sampson
25 November	Milan	Italy	Fabrique	Alex Sampson
27 November	Madrid	Spain	Las Ventas	Alex Sampson
28 November	Lisbon	Portugal	Sala Tejo	Alex Sampson

List of 2027 concerts
Date (2027)	City	Country	Venue	Supporting acts
18 January	Mexico City	Mexico	Auditorio BB	—N/a
21 January	Bogotá	Colombia	Teatro Royal Center	—N/a
23 January	Santiago	Chile	Teatro Coliseo	—N/a
25 January	Buenos Aires	Argentina	C Art Media	—N/a
27 January	São Paulo	Brazil	Audio	—N/a
12 February	Bangkok	Thailand	Samyan Mitrtown Hall	—N/a
14 February	Singapore		Capitol Theatre	—N/a
16 February	Quezon City (Note: Labelled as Manila in promotional material.)	Philippines	New Frontier Theater	—N/a
18 February	Tokyo	Japan	The Garden Hall	—N/a
20 February	Seoul	South Korea	Myunghwa Live Hall	—N/a
22 February	New Taipei City (Note: Labelled as Taipei in promotional material.)	Taiwan	Zepp New Taipei	—N/a
