= Zombies 5: Secrets of the Sea =

Upcoming 2027 film

- Based on: Characters created by David Light & Joseph Raso
- Written by: Chris Hazzard; Michael Fontana; Eydie Faye
- Directed by: Paul Hoen
- Starring: Malachi Barton; Freya Skye; Trevor Tordjman; Julian Lerner; Swayam Bhatia; Mekonnen Knife; Diaana Babnicova; Taylor Oliver; Olive Mortimer; Emily Costtrici
- Composer: Tom Howe
- Country of origin: United States
- Original language: English

Production
- Executive producers: David Light & Joseph Raso; Meg Donnelly; Milo Manheim; Paul Hoen
- Producer: Skot Bright
- Production location: Auckland, New Zealand
- Production companies: Bloor Street Productions; Court Five; Night Zone Productions; Disney Kids & Family

Original release
- Network: Disney Channel; Disney+

Related
- Zombies; Zombies 2 Zombies 3 Zombies: The Re-Animated Series; Zombies 4: Dawn of the Vampires

Zombies 5: Secrets of the Sea (Note: Stylized with hyphens as Z-O-M-B-I-E-S 5: Secrets of the Sea) is an upcoming 2027 American musical fantasy film directed by Paul Hoen and written by Chris Hazzard, Michael Fontana and Eydie Faye. Produced by Disney Channel, it is the sequel to the 2025 film Zombies 4: Dawn of the Vampires, and the fifth installment in the Zombies film series.

Malachi Barton and Freya Skye reprise their roles, starring as Victor and Nova, respectively. Trevor Tordjman reprises his role as Bucky from the first three Zombies films.

It is scheduled to be released on Disney Channel and Disney+ in summer 2027.

== Cast ==
- Malachi Barton as Victor, a vampire and Nova's boyfriend
- Freya Skye as Nova Bright, a daywalker and Victor's girlfriend
- Trevor Tordjman as Bucky Buchanan
- Julian Lerner as Ray, a daywalker
- Swayam Bhatia as Vera, a vampire
- Mekonnen Knife as Vargas, a vampire
- Diaana Babnicova as Pearl, a mermaid
- Taylor Oliver as Fin
- Olive Mortimer as Sandy, a mermaid
- Emily Costtrici as Izzy, Zed's zombie cousin and new transfer student
- Mia Chandler Altera as Shelly, Pearl's little sister

== Production ==
=== Development ===
On December 4, 2025, Production Weekly revealed that a fifth Zombies film was in-development. In February 2026, Craig Erwich, president of the Disney Television Group, confirmed the existence of the film. The film was officially greenlit on March 2, 2026, with franchise stars Milo Manheim and Meg Donnelly set to return to executive produce. DGA Award-winner Paul Hoen, director and executive producer of the entire Zombies franchise, will return for this latest installment. Also returning are executive producers Jane Fleming, Mark Ordesky, Joseph Raso and David Light and producer Skot Bright, alongside Manheim and Donnelly. The movie features next-level dance sequences, choreographed by Dondraico Johnson, and an original score composed by Tom Howe. Joining the creative team are writers Chris Hazzard, Michael Fontana and Eydie Faye.

=== Casting ===
Freya Skye and Malachi Barton reprise their leading roles as Nova and Victor, respectively. Trevor Tordjman also reprises his character as Bucky, from the previous films, with Swayam Bhatia, Julian Lerner and Mekonnen Knife returning to their respective roles. The new additions to the cast include the trio of mermaids played by Diaana Babnicova as Pearl, Taylor Oliver as Fin and Olive Mortimer as Sandy and the zombie Izzy played by Emily Costtrici.

=== Filming ===
Production began in April 2026 in Auckland, New Zealand.
