= Bradley Center =

Former arena in downtown Milwaukee, Wisconsin

- The B.C. The Fortress on 4th Street

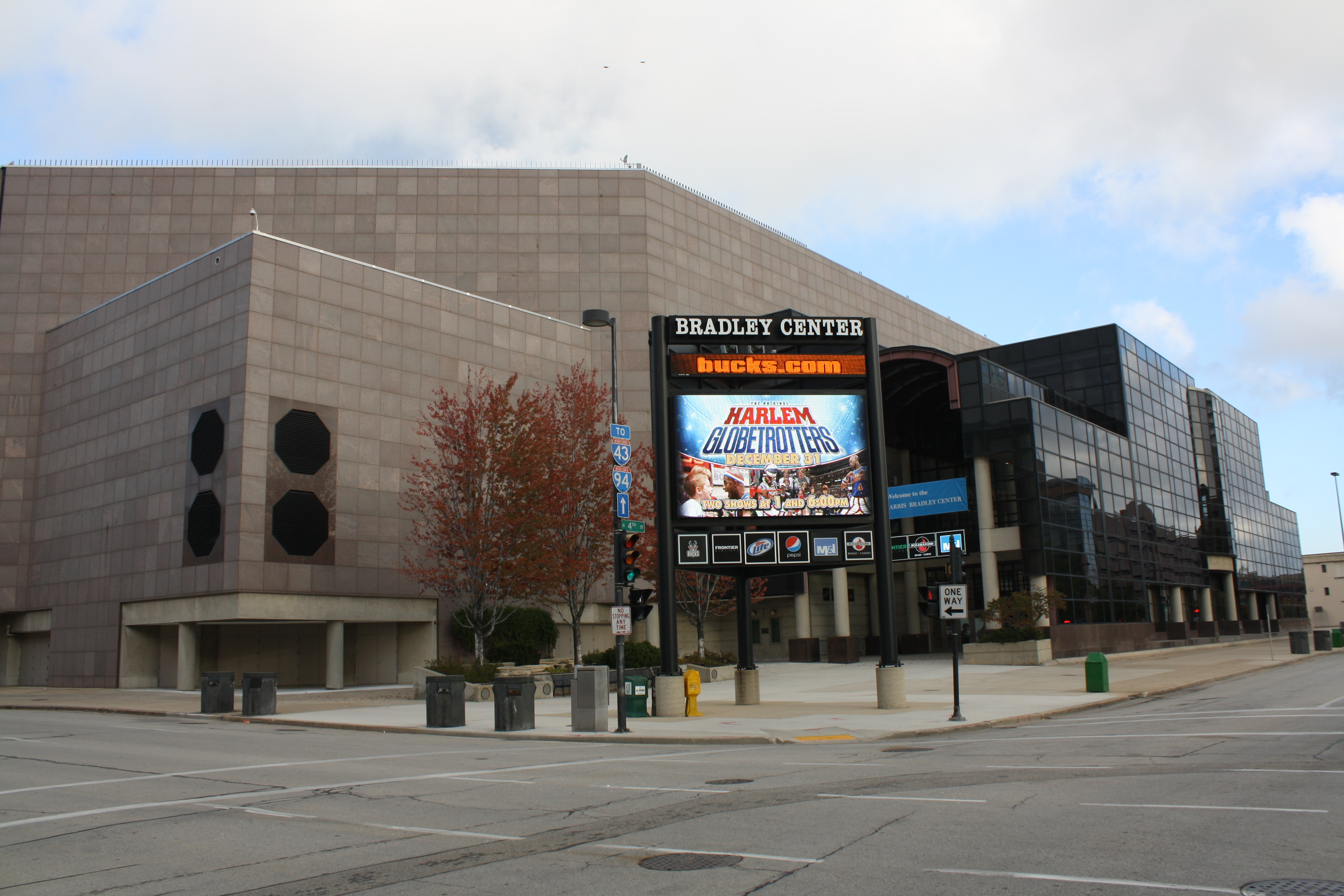
- Interactive map of Bradley Center
- Address: 1001 N. Vel R. Phillips Ave.
- Location: Milwaukee, Wisconsin
- Coordinates: 43°2′37″N 87°55′1″W
- Owner: Bradley Center Sports and Entertainment Corporation
- Capacity: Wrestling: 18,800; Concerts: 20,000; College basketball: 18,850; Basketball: 18,633 (1988–97); 18,717 (1997–2018); Ice hockey: 17,845; Indoor soccer: 17,800
- Scoreboard: White Way

Construction
- Groundbreaking: October 20, 1986
- Opened: October 1, 1988
- Closed: July 25, 2018
- Demolished: January–May 2019
- Cost: $91 million ($267 million in 2025 dollars)
- Architects: HOK Sport; Kahler Slater; Torphy Architects; Venture Architects
- Structural engineer: Thornton Tomasetti
- Services engineer: M-E Engineers
- General contractor: Huber, Hunt & Nichols

Tenants
- Milwaukee Bucks (NBA) 1988–2018; Milwaukee Admirals (IHL/AHL) 1988–2016; Marquette Golden Eagles (NCAA) 1988–2018; Milwaukee Wave (NPSL/MISL) 1988–2003; Milwaukee Mustangs (AFL) 1994–2001; Milwaukee Iron/Mustangs (AF2/AFL) 2009–2012

The Bradley Center (also known as the BMO Harris Bradley Center under sponsorship agreements) was a multi-purpose arena located on the northwest corner of North Vel R. Phillips Ave. and West State Streets in downtown Milwaukee, Wisconsin, United States.

It was home to the Milwaukee Bucks of the NBA and the Marquette University men's basketball team. It was also the home of the Milwaukee Wave of the MISL, from 1988 to 2003, the original Milwaukee Mustangs of the AFL from 1994 to 2001, along with the second incarnation of the team from 2009 to 2012, the Badger Hockey Showdown from 1989 to 2002, and the Milwaukee Admirals of the AHL (and formerly of the IHL) from 1988 to 2016.

The arena employed about 50 full-time employees, mostly tradespeople, and about 700 part-time employees to help during events.

Following the opening of the new Fiserv Forum in late August 2018, the Bradley Center was demolished to make way for future development. Assets from the arena, including display boards, scoreboards, equipment and sports and concert memorabilia were auctioned off.

== History ==
The arena opened on October 1, 1988, with an exhibition hockey game between the Chicago Blackhawks and the Edmonton Oilers. At $90 million, it was meant to be a modern replacement of its current cross-street neighbor, The MECCA (now the UW–Milwaukee Panther Arena), built in 1950. The arena was built as an attempt to attract an expansion franchise for the National Hockey League, though this never occurred, and the International Hockey League's Milwaukee Admirals (later moving to the American Hockey League) used the arena for the majority of its existence. The MECCA, during much of its time operating as an NBA facility, had the league's smallest seating capacity, holding just over 11,000 people. Funds to build the Center were donated as a gift to the State of Wisconsin by broadcaster/Admirals owner Lloyd Pettit and his wife, Jane Bradley Pettit, in memory of Jane's late father, Harry Lynde Bradley of the Allen-Bradley company; the latter was noted upon the arena's exterior with subtle decorative outlines, hinting of its trademark octagonal logo.

Despite being one of the premier NBA facilities when completed in 1988, it was one of the oldest active NBA arenas by the end of the Bucks' tenancy in 2018, only behind Madison Square Garden in New York City, and Oakland Arena, although both had been extensively renovated during the Bradley Center's lifetime, and the latter was replaced by the Chase Center in San Francisco in 2019. The donation from the Pettits did not include provisions for the building's long-term capital needs or annual operating expenses. While the facility was self-sufficient, its tenants had been at a disadvantage compared with other NBA teams due to the arrangement in the arena's later years.

For several years, former Bucks owner and former U.S. Senator Herb Kohl proposed constructing a new, state-of-the-art downtown arena, but the community reaction to the idea of a publicly funded arena was mostly negative. In 2009, Wisconsin Governor Jim Doyle included a provision in the state's capital budget seeking $5 million in state bonding support to renovate the Bradley Center. The Bradley Center's board of directors told state officials that the building needs $23 million in renovations, so they reportedly agreed to raise the remaining $18 million on their own.

During the summer of 2010, the arena's longtime Sony Jumbotron scoreboard was replaced with a new 3.5-million-pixel LED unit manufactured by TS Sports and Lighthouse Technologies, and was put into service in October 2010 at the start of the Admirals season. Unlike many other NBA and NHL scoreboards, the bottom panel also has an LED screen, allowing display of many images above the floor itself rather than a static image of a sponsor or team logo.

On May 21, 2012, the Bucks' then-owner Herb Kohl and representatives from BMO Harris Bank announced that the bank had officially purchased the naming rights for the Bradley Center, and it would now be called the BMO Harris Bradley Center. The last game at the Bradley Center was an NBA playoff game won by the Bucks over the Celtics, 97–86, on April 26, 2018.

The arena's final public event was a Bon Jovi concert on April 29, 2018, while the arena's final overall event was the annual meeting of Northwestern Mutual Life's agents and beneficiaries from July 20 through July 24, 2018, concluding with a private concert by the Zac Brown Band.

=== Replacement and demolition ===
On September 18, 2013, then-deputy NBA commissioner Adam Silver toured the arena and found it unbefitting of an NBA team. Silver said that the building was a few thousand square feet short of NBA standards, and also lacked numerous amenities. The NBA issued a mandate requiring the Bucks to relocate, or be close to completion of a new facility by 2017.

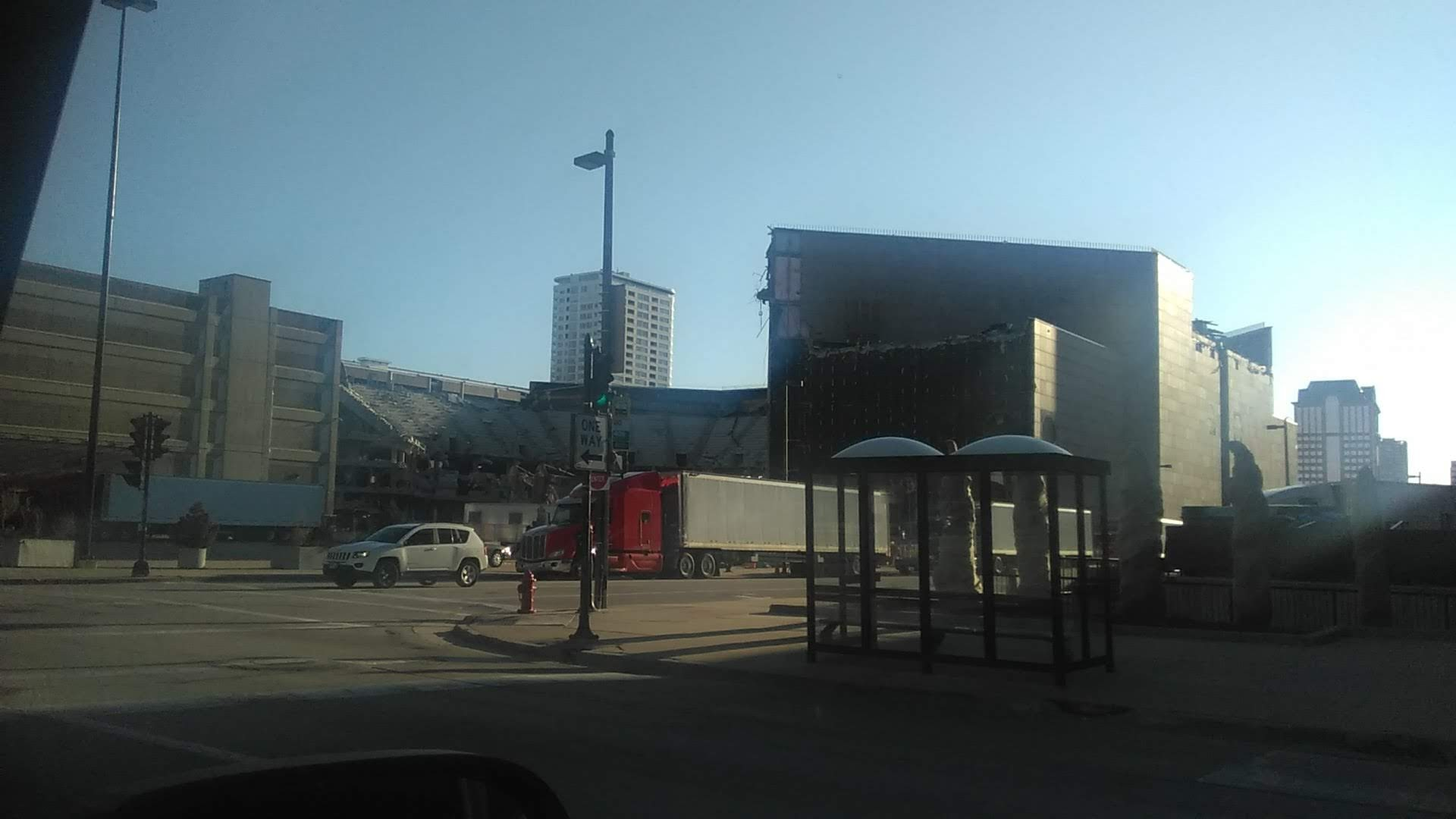
The BMO Harris Bradley Center during demolition on March 31, 2019.

On April 16, 2014, Bucks' owner Herb Kohl announced an agreement to sell the franchise to New York City hedge-fund investors Marc Lasry and Wesley Edens. The deal included provisions for $100 million each from Kohl and the new ownership group, for a total of $200 million, toward the construction of a new downtown arena.

On July 15, 2015, the Wisconsin Senate approved funding for the new Fiserv Forum by a 21-10 margin, and on July 28, 2015, the Wisconsin State Assembly approved funding by a 52-34 margin. On August 12, 2015, Governor Scott Walker signed the arena spending plan at Wisconsin State Fair Park in West Allis, Wisconsin.

During the summer of 2016, the Admirals moved to the Panther Arena and the Bradley Center was modified to allow normal operation for two years while making space for the construction of the new arena to the north. The arena's icemaking plant and HVAC buildings were demolished and the arena's cooling facilities moved to a smaller facility away from the construction site. With the arena hosting no further hockey games, portable icemaking equipment was used for its last two ice events, the 2017 and 2018 runs of Disney on Ice. Other modifications included a temporary loading dock and trash disposal facilities on the east side of the building.

Over $1 million in electrical equipment, luxury suite furniture, and bathroom fixtures from the Bradley Center was donated to the Local 494 of the International Brotherhood of Electrical Workers, the Milwaukee chapter of Habitat for Humanity, and Milwaukee Public Schools. Due to the arena's close proximity to adjacent buildings, including the Fiserv Forum and the historic Turner Hall, the arena was deconstructed over a period of nine months. The Bucks still own the Bradley Center site for future development. Exterior demolition of the arena began in the spring of 2019, starting at the northwest corner of the structure. Demolition contractors used explosives to cut the steel structure, but not enough to trigger an implosion of the entire arena due to the nearby presences of Turner Hall and the Journal Sentinel building. On January 13, 2019 the roof of the Bradley Center was imploded. The final standing part of the Bradley Center was felled on May 31, 2019. Bucks officials state that redevelopment of the Bradley Center site would not start until after the 2020 Democratic National Convention takes place. In May 2024, construction began on Landmark Credit Union Live, an indoor concert venue, and it opened on February 27, 2026.

During the Bucks' run to the NBA Finals in 2021, the Bradley Center site was used as part of the viewing parties in the Deer District for the Bucks' playoff games. For the Bucks' game 6 victory in the Eastern Conference Finals, the Fiserv Forum's plaza and the Bradley Center site had over 65,000 fans in total watching the game.

Landmark Credit Union Live, built on the northeast corner of the former Bradley Center site, opened in 2026.

== Notable events ==
=== College sports ===
The arena hosted the NCAA men's Frozen Four finals in 1993, 1997 and 2006 and the Great Midwest Conference men's basketball tournament in 1995.

The Bradley Center was a host site for second and third-round games in the NCAA Division I men's basketball tournament in 1992, 1996, 1999, 2004, 2010, 2014, 2017.

=== MMA and professional wrestling ===
The Bradley Center was host to World Wrestling Entertainment events since February 1989 (then WWF) when it hosted The Main Event II, where the Mega Powers of Macho Man Randy Savage and Hulk Hogan disbanded, setting up a match between the two stars at WrestleMania V. Shortly thereafter, WWE's ratings fell and they began using the smaller MECCA for shows.

In the early 2000s, WWE returned to the Bradley Center for pay-per-views No Way Out (2002), which saw the debut of the NWO, Taboo Tuesday (2004), Elimination Chamber (2012), and Fastlane (2017). The Bradley Center also regularly hosted episodes of Raw and SmackDown.

The BMO Harris Bradley Center also played host to the first UFC event in Wisconsin: UFC Live: Hardy vs. Lytle on August 14, 2011. UFC 164 was also held at the arena on August 31, 2013.

=== Other events ===
The Jerry Garcia Band played the Bradley Center on November 28, 1991, a show that was later released as Garcia Live Volume Eight. Early auditions for the tenth season of American Idol were held at the arena on July 21, 2010 with 10,000 people auditioning.

== Images ==
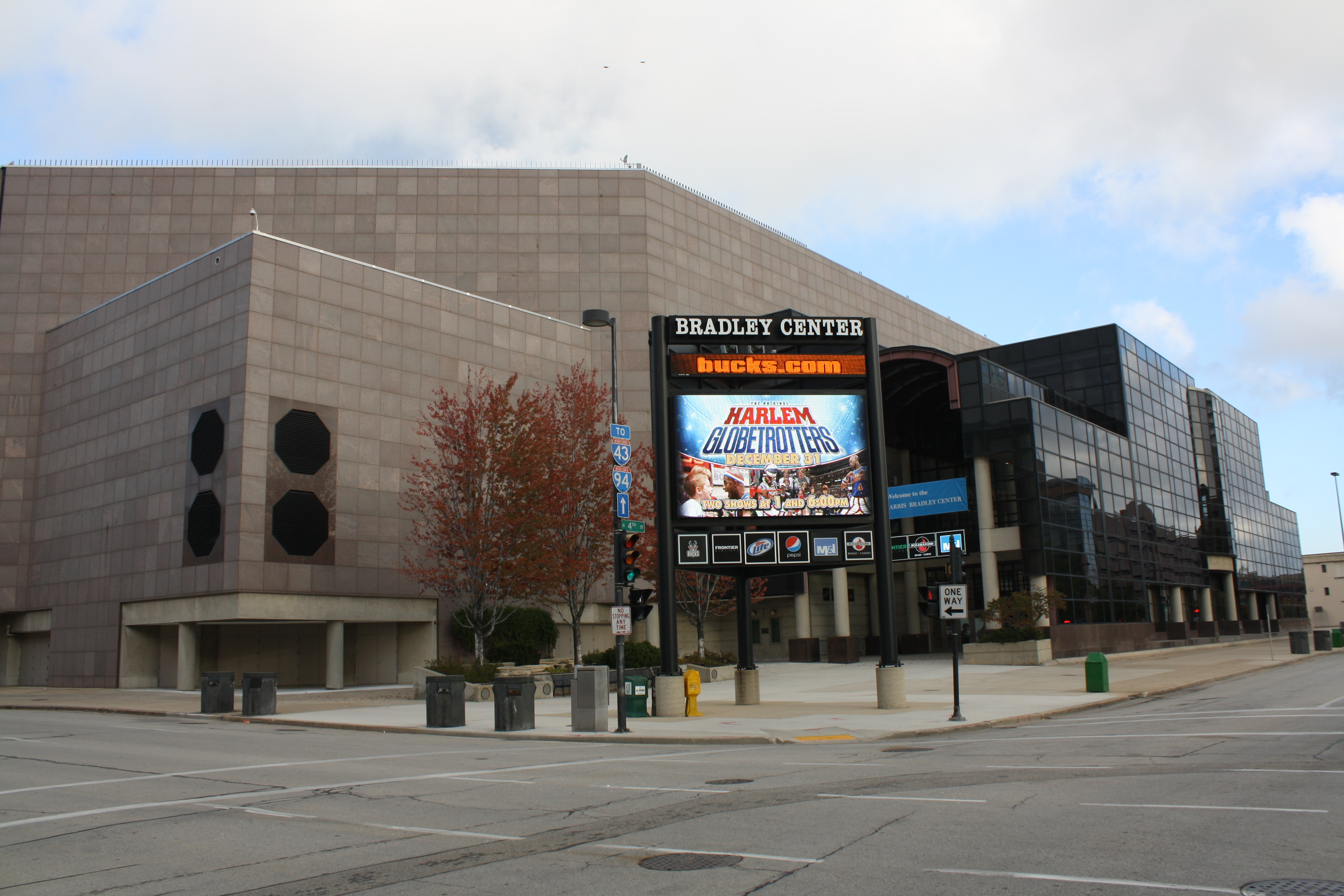
Southeast entrance in 2012.

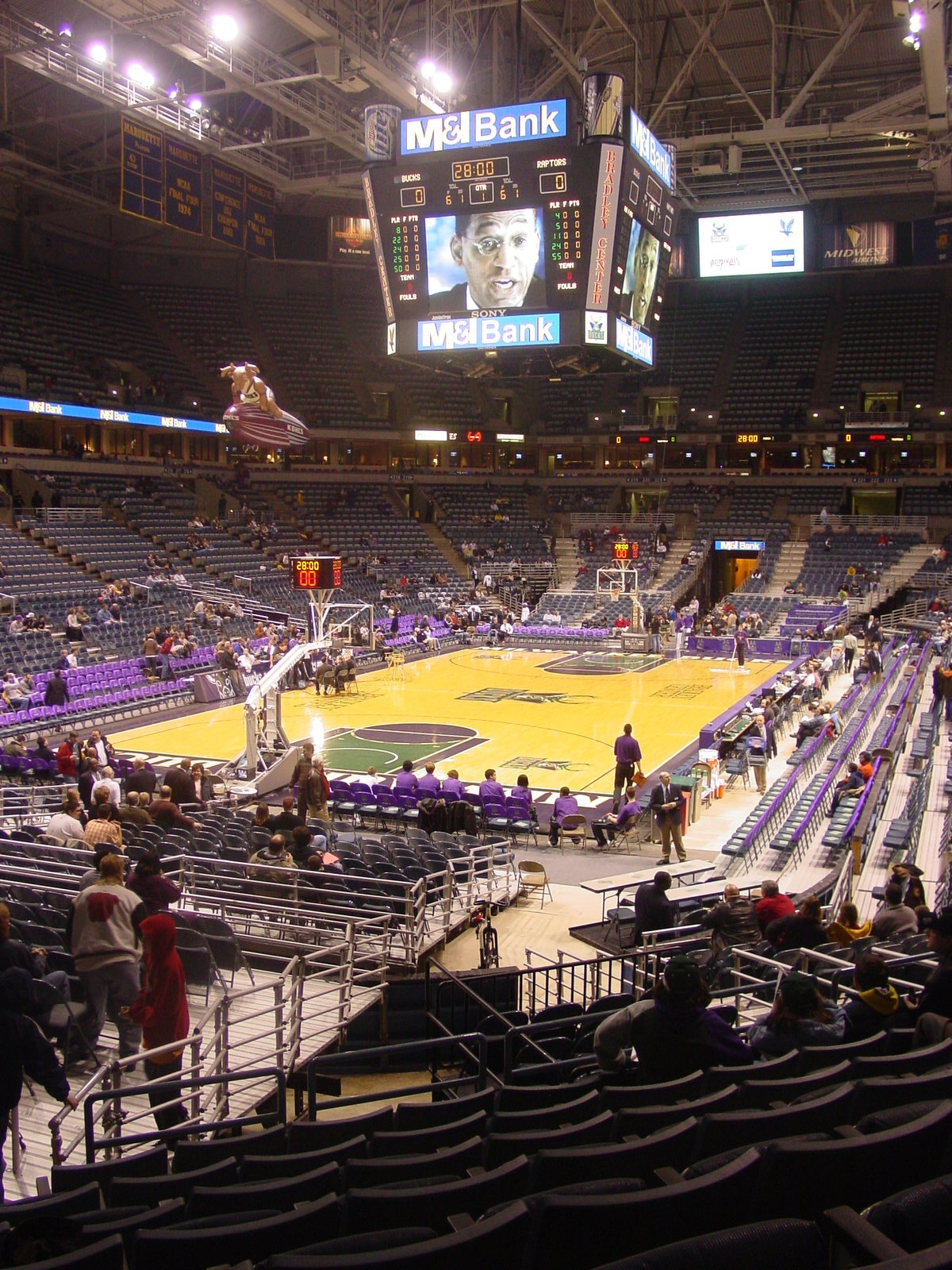
The arena set up for a Milwaukee Bucks game in 2005.

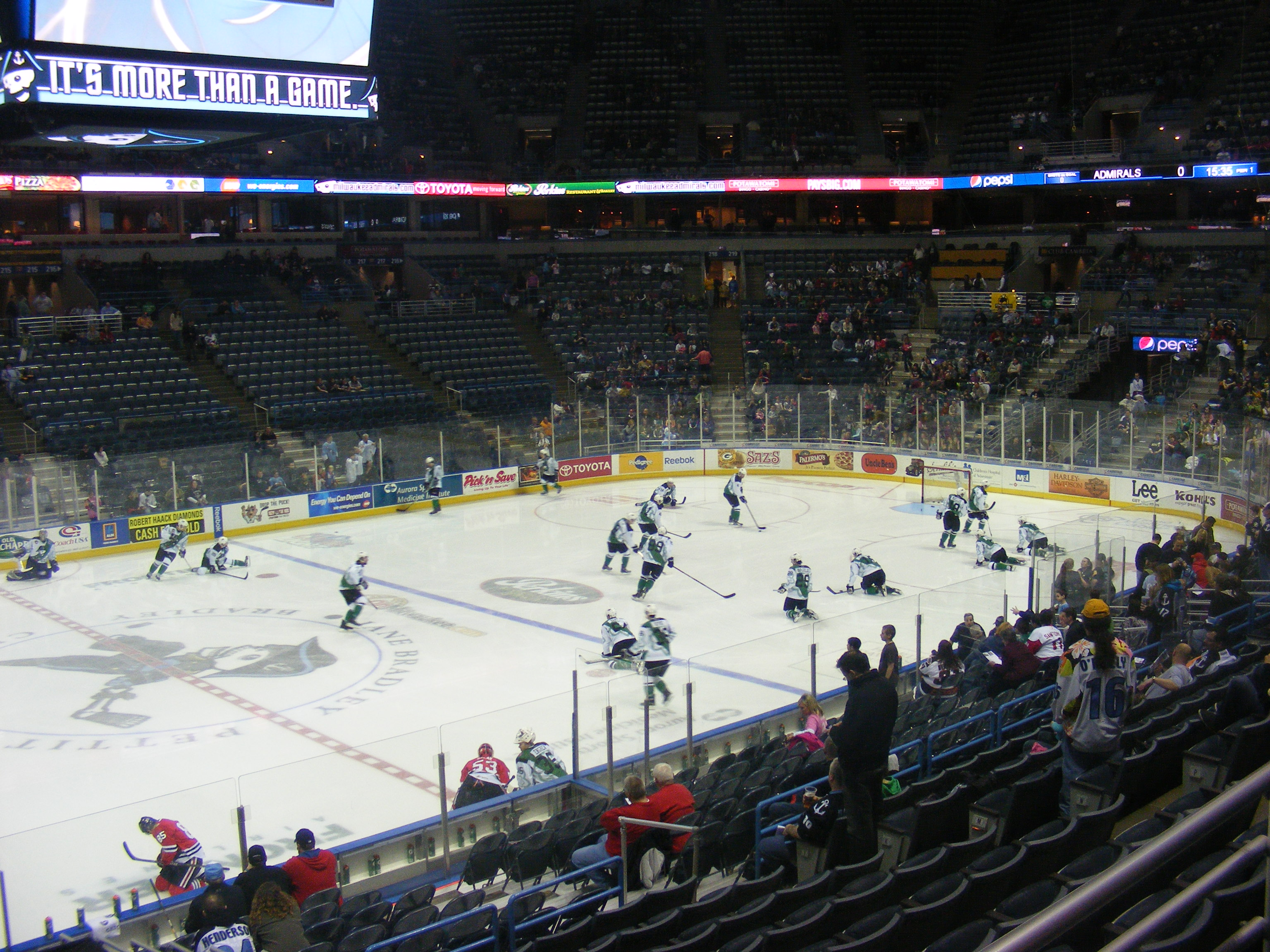
The arena set up for a Milwaukee Admirals game in 2011.

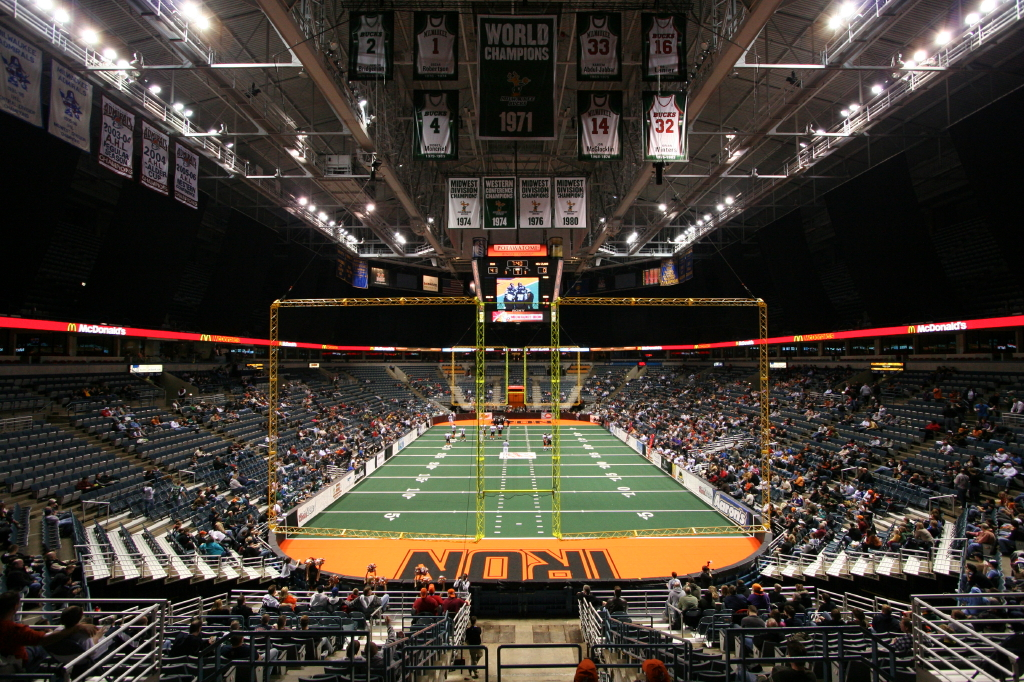
The arena set up for a Milwaukee Iron game in 2009.

== See also ==
- List of NCAA Division I basketball arenas

Events and tenants
Preceded by MECCA Arena	Home of the Milwaukee Bucks; 1988–2018	Succeeded by Fiserv Forum
Preceded by Knickerbocker Arena; Albany, New York	Host of the men's Frozen Four; 1993	Succeeded by Saint Paul Civic Center; St. Paul, Minnesota
Preceded by Riverfront Coliseum; Cincinnati	Host of the men's Frozen Four; 1997	Succeeded by FleetCenter; Boston
Preceded by Value City Arena; Columbus, Ohio	Host of the men's Frozen Four; 2006	Succeeded by Scottrade Center; St. Louis, Missouri
