= Zombies (franchise) =

American musical media franchise

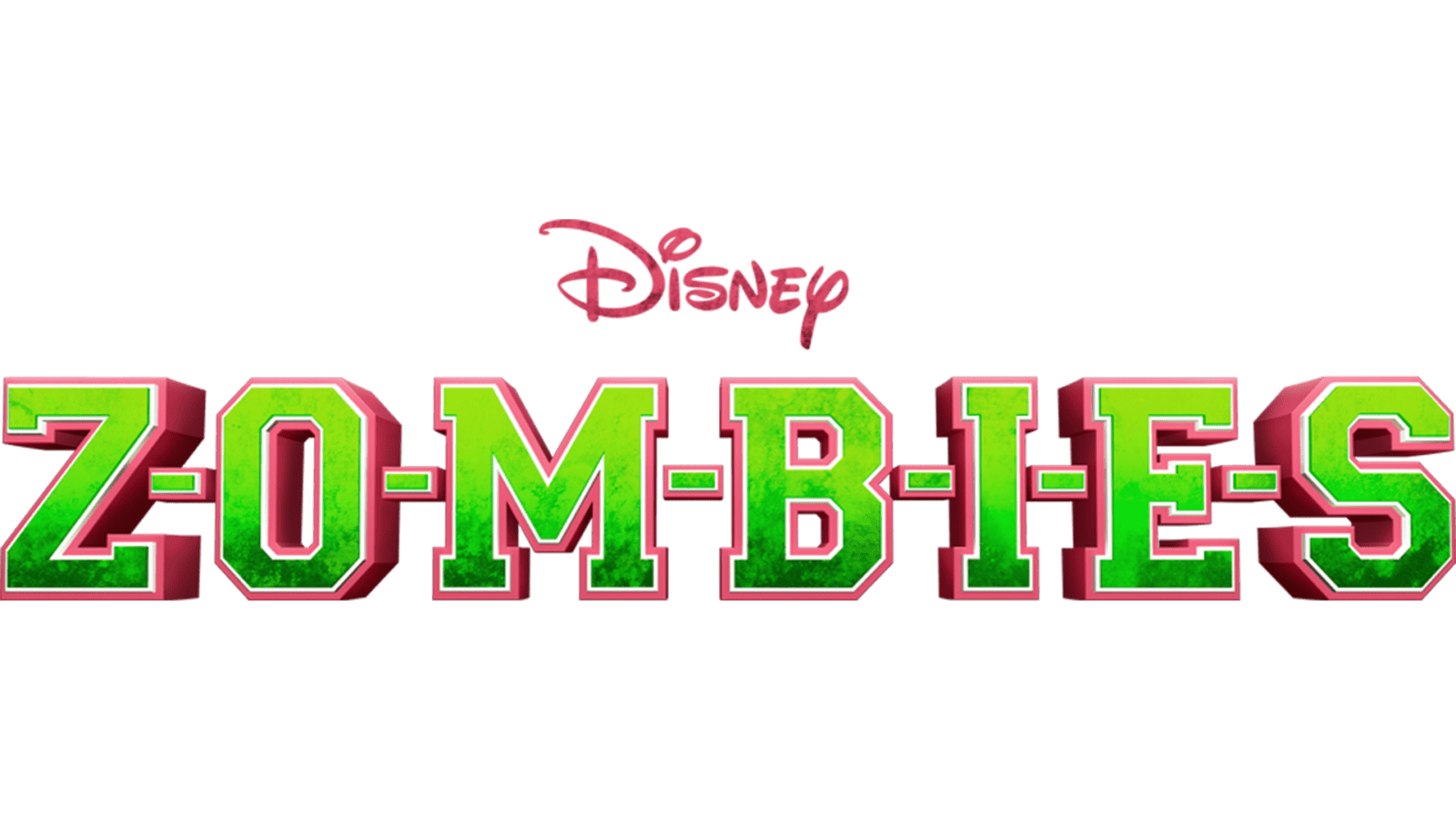
- Logo of the Zombies franchise.
- Created by: David Light; Joseph Raso
- Original work: Zombies (2018)
- Owners: Disney Channel; Disney Branded Television
- Years: 2018–present
- Based on: Zombies and Cheerleaders by David Light & Joseph Raso

Films and television
- Animated series: Zombies: The Re-Animated Series (2024)
- Television short: Zombies: Addison's Moonstone Mystery (2020–2021)
- Television films: Zombies (2018); Zombies 2 (2020); Zombies 3 (2022); Zombies 4: Dawn of the Vampires (2025); Zombies 5: Secrets of the Sea (2027)

Theatrical presentations
- Musicals: Descendants/Zombies: Worlds Collide Tour (2025); Descendants/Zombies/Camp Rock: Worlds Collide Concert Tour (2026-2027)

Miscellaneous
- Directed by: Paul Hoen
- Produced by: Mary Pantelidis (1–3); Skot Bright (4)
- Written by: David Light; Joseph Raso; Josh Cagan (4)
- Music by: George S. Clinton (1–3); Amit May Cohen (2–3); Tom Howe (4)
- Starring: Meg Donnelly (1–4); Milo Manheim (1–4); Freya Skye (4–present); Malachi Barton (4–present)
- Cinematography: Robert Drinkmann (1); Rudolf Blahacek (2); Christian Herrera (3); Carlos González (4)
- Edited by: Lisa Jane Robison (1); Lisa Binkley (2–4)

The Zombies franchise consists of five musical adventure-comedy films directed by Paul Hoen, three Disney Channel Original Movies and two films that premiered on Disney+ before airing on Disney Channel. Created by David Light and Joseph Raso, the series consists of Zombies (2018), Zombies 2 (2020), Zombies 3 (2022), Zombies 4 (2025), and Zombies 5 (2027). The franchise stars Milo Manheim as Zed & Meg Donnelly as Addison while Malachi Barton as Victor & Freya Skye as Nova Bright star in the fourth film and onward. Zombies premiered on Disney Channel on February 16, 2018, Zombies 2 premiered on Disney Channel on February 14, 2020, and Zombies 3 premiered on Disney+ on July 15, 2022 before airing on Disney Channel on August 12, 2022. Zombies 4: Dawn of the Vampires premiered on Disney Channel on July 10, 2025. It was originally meant to be a television series titled Zombies and Cheerleaders, but it was never developed and was instead remade as the film Zombies.

== Film series ==
=== Zombies (2018) ===
Students from Zombietown transfer to Seabrook High, a school whose suburban town is filled with uniformity, traditions and pep rallies. When Zombie football player Zed and human cheerleader Addison fall in love, chaos ensues, and the two must lead their groups' to coexistence with each other.

In May 2017, Zombies was reported to have begun production. Its trailer was released on January 5, 2018. Zombies was released on February 16, 2018. The film was watched by 2.6 million viewers on its premiere night.

=== Zombies 2 (2020) ===
Zed and Addison have continued to steer both their school and community toward unity. However, the arrival of the werewolves complicates their relationship.

In early 2019, a sequel to Zombies was in production, with the actors, director and writer returning. Pearce Joza, Chandler Kinney, and Ariel Martin joined the cast with Kylee Russell, Trevor Tordjman, Carla Jeffery, James Godfrey, and Kingston Foster reprising their roles from the first film. The film was released on February 14, 2020, watched by 2.5 million viewers and received positive reviews.

=== Zombies 3 (2022) ===
Seabrook's humans, zombies, and werewolves coexist. Being this is senior year at Seabrook's high school for Zed and Addison, the former is looking to become the first zombie admitted into higher education with a football scholarship, and the latter is in the final stages of preparing to open a new cheerleading pavilion and host a competition consisting of cheer teams from around the world. Meanwhile, aliens arrive at Seabrook, whose leaders A-Spen, A-Li, and A-Lan initially claiming they are interested in spectating the cheer competition Addison organized.

In late-March 2021, Disney Channel green-lit Zombies 3 with Meg Donnelly and Milo Manheim returning to star. Paul Hoen was also reported to be returning as director as well as David Light and Joseph Raso as writers. Light, Raso and Suzanne Farwell will executive produce. On May 19, 2021, Matt Cornett, Kyra Tantao and Terry Hu joined the cast as A-Lan, A-Li and A-Spen. Chandler Kinney, Pearce Joza, Ariel Martin, Trevor Tordjman, Carla Jeffery, Kylee Russell, James Godfrey and Kingston Foster were reported to be reprising their roles. Production began on May 31, 2021. In May 2022, it was announced that RuPaul would be voicing the mothership. It was also announced that the film would premiere on July 15, 2022 on Disney+ as an original film, with an extended version premiering on Disney Channel on August 12.

=== Zombies 4: Dawn of the Vampires (2025) ===
In February 2024, Disney Branded Television greenlit Zombies 4, with Meg Donnelly and Milo Manheim reprising their roles and are also set to executive produce the film. Chandler Kinney and Kylee Russell were also set to return for the film. Additionally, Freya Skye and Malachi Barton join the cast as new characters, Nova and Victor, respectively. Paul Hoen returns to direct, with David Light, Joseph Raso, and Josh Cagan writing the film. Hoen, Light, Raso, Jane Fleming, and Mark Ordesky will also serve as executive producers. Mahita P. Simpson will co-executive produce the film. Production for the film began in March 2024 in New Zealand. In March 2024, Swayam Bhatia, Julian Lerner, Mekonnen Knife, Lisa Chappell, and Jonno Roberts joined the cast. Zombies 4: Dawn of the Vampires premiered on Disney Channel on July 10, 2025.

=== Zombies 5: Secrets of The Sea (2027) ===
In February 2026, Disney Television Studios president Craig Erwich announced that a fifth film was in production at Disney Branded Television hinting a potential Summer 2027 release. The film was officially greenlit on March 2 with production due to begin in New Zealand that spring. Meg Donnelly and Milo Manheim will not reprise their roles, but will return to executive produce the film. In May 2026, the film was given an official title Zombies 5: Secrets Of The Sea.

== Television series ==
=== Zombies: Addison's Moonstone Mystery / Zombies: Addison's Monster Mystery (2020–21) ===
On October 16, 2020, Zombies: Addison's Moonstone Mystery, a series of animated shorts, began airing on Disney Channel. The story revolves around Addison (Meg Donnelly) who journeys through a mysterious dreamscape to find her true identity. The series was renewed for a second season with its new title, Addison’s Monster Mystery, which premiered on October 1, 2021.

=== Zombies: The Re-Animated Series (2024) ===
In June 2022, during the Annecy Film Festival, it was reported that an animated series, titled Zombies: The Re-animated Series, is being developed by Disney Television Animation for Disney+ and Disney Channel. Descendants: Wicked World creator and director Aliki Theofilopoulos and Amphibia story editor Jack Ferriolo will serve as creators and showrunners. The duo will also executive-produce the series alongside Gary Marsh and the films' writers Joseph Russo and David Light. Zombies: The Re-animated Series Shorts premiered on July 21, 2023 on Disney Channel, and the full series debuted on June 28, 2024.

== Live performances ==
=== Worlds Collide Tour (2025–2027) ===
At the Disney Entertainment Showcase on August 9, 2024, held during the D23 Expo, Disney Branded Television, Disney Concerts, Disney Music Group, and AEG announced the Descendants/Zombies: Worlds Collide Tour, set for summer 2025. The tour will bring together stars from both the Descendants and Zombies franchises, with appearances by the Descendants: The Rise of Red and Zombies 4: Dawn of the Vampires stars Kylie Cantrall, Malia Baker, Dara Reneé, Ruby Rose Turner, Freya Skye and Malachi Barton. The tour will be an immersive and interactive live concert experience celebrating music from both franchises and will be held in arenas across the United States, from July 17 through September 16, 2025. On June 27, 2025, the cast of the tour released the single "Worlds Collide", with vocals from Kylie Cantrall, Malia Baker, Dara Reneé, Joshua Colley, Malachi Barton, Freya Skye and Mekonnen Knife.

On March 18, 2026, Disney and AEG announced a sequel to the Descendants/Zombies: Worlds Collide Tour that will include the return of Descendants and Zombies franchises, as well as the Camp Rock franchise joining the tour with 48 tour dates originally set. 11 additional tour dates were later added for early 2027. The cast includes the return of Malachi Barton, Dara Reneé, and Mekonnen Knife, and former special guest from the Descendants/Zombies: Worlds Collide Tour, Liamani was added a full cast member. Other cast members include Zombies 4: Dawn of the Vampires star Swayam Bhatia, Camp Rock 3 star Hudson Stone, and Descendants: Wicked Wonderland stars Kiara Romero and Alexandro Byrd.

== Crew ==
Year	Film	Director	Producer	Writers	Composer(s)	Cinematographers	Editor
2018	Zombies	Paul Hoen	Mary Pantelidis	David Light & Joseph Raso	George S. Clinton	Robert Drinkmann	Lisa Jane Robinson
2020	Zombies 2	Paul Hoen	Mary Pantelidis	David Light & Joseph Raso	Amit May Cohen & George S. Clinton	Rudolf Blahacek	Lisa Binkley
2022	Zombies 3	Paul Hoen	Mary Pantelidis	David Light & Joseph Raso	Amit May Cohen & George S. Clinton	Christian Herrera	Lisa Binkley
2025	Zombies 4: Dawn of the Vampires	Paul Hoen	Skot Bright	Josh Cagan, David Light & Joseph Raso	Tom Howe	Carlos González	Lisa Binkley
2027	Zombies 5: Secrets of the Sea	Paul Hoen	Skot Bright	Chris Hazzard, Michael Fontana & Eydie Faye	Tom Howe		

== Cast ==
List indicators

This section includes characters who will appear or have appeared in the series.

- An empty grey cell indicates the character was not in the film, or that the character's official presence has not yet been confirmed.
- ^{V} indicates a voice-only role.

Character	Films					Television series	
Character	Zombies	Zombies 2	Zombies 3	Zombies 4 Dawn of the Vampires	Zombies 5 Secrets of the Sea	Zombies: Addison's Moonstone Mystery	Zombies The Re-Animated Series
Character	2018	2020	2022	2025	2027	2020–2021	2024
Zed Necrodopolis	Milo Manheim	Milo Manheim	Milo Manheim	Milo Manheim		Milo Manheim	Milo Manheim
Addison Wells	Meg Donnelly	Meg Donnelly	Meg Donnelly	Meg Donnelly		Meg Donnelly	Meg Donnelly
Bucky Buchanan	Trevor Tordjman	Trevor Tordjman	Trevor Tordjman		Trevor Tordjman	Trevor Tordjman	Trevor Tordjman
Eliza Zambi	Kylee Russell	Kylee Russell	Kylee Russell	Kylee Russell		Kylee Russell	Kylee Russell
Bree	Carla Jeffery	Carla Jeffery	Carla Jeffery				Carla Jeffery
Zoey Necrodopolis	Kingston Foster	Kingston Foster	Kingston Foster				Kingston Foster
Bonzo	James Godfrey	James Godfrey	James Godfrey				James Godfrey
Principal Lee	Naomi Snieckus	Naomi Snieckus	Naomi Snieckus				Naomi Snieckus
Coach	Jonathan Langdon	Jonathan Langdon	Jonathan Langdon				Jonathan Langdon
Dale Wells	Paul Hopkins	Paul Hopkins	Paul Hopkins				
Missy Wells	Marie Wards	Marie Wards	Marie Wards				
Zevon Necrodopolis	Tony Nappo	Tony Nappo	Tony Nappo				
Lacey	Emilia McCarthy	Emilia McCarthy	Emilia McCarthy				
Stacey	Jasmine Renee Thomas	Jasmine Renee Thomas	Jasmine Renee Thomas				
Tracey	Mickeey Nguyen						
Willa Lykensen		Chandler Kinney	Chandler Kinney	Chandler Kinney		Chandler Kinney	Chandler Kinney
Wyatt Lykensen		Pearce Joza	Pearce Joza			Pearce Joza	Pearce Joza
Wynter Barkowitz		Ariel Martin	Ariel Martin			Ariel Martin	Ariel Martin
Kevin "Jacey"		Noah Zulfikar	Noah Zulfikar				
A-Lan			Matt Cornett				
A-Li			Kyra Tantao				
A-Spen			Terry Hu				Terry Hu
The Mothership			RuPaul Charles^{V}				
Angie			Sheila McCarthy				
Nova Bright				Freya Skye	Freya Skye		
Victor				Malachi Barton	Malachi Barton		
Vera				Swayam Bhatia	Swayam Bhatia		
Ray				Julian Lerner	Julian Lerner		
Vargas				Mekonnen Knife	Mekonnen Knife		
Commander Bright				Jonno Roberts	Jonno Roberts		
Vampire Eldress				Lisa Chappell			
Pearl					Diaana Babnicova		
Fin					Taylor Oliver		
Sandy					Olive Mortimer		
Izzy Necrodopolis					Emily Costtrici		

== Reception ==
=== Viewership ===
In May 2025, the Walt Disney Company announced that each of the first three Zombies films' cable premieres had ranked No. 1 among children aged 6–11 and tweens aged 9–14, with the franchise accumulating nearly a quarter-billion streaming hours on Disney+ to date. Zombies 4: Dawn of the Vampires amassed 9.3 million views globally within its first 10 days of streaming on Disney+.

=== Critical response ===
Film	Rotten Tomatoes
Zombies	—N/a
Zombies 2	100% (5 reviews)
Zombies 3	75% (8 reviews)

=== Impact ===
The first Zombies (2018) soundtrack reached number one on the Kid Albums chart for ten weeks, number five on the Soundtracks chart, and number 55 on the Billboard 200. Zombies 2 (2020) peaked at number two on both the Kid Albums and Soundtracks charts, and number 44 on the Billboard 200. Zombies 3 (2022) reached number one on the Kid Albums chart for two weeks, number three on the Soundtracks chart, and number 79 on the Billboard. Zombies 4: Dawn of the Vampires (2025) debuted at number one on the Billboard Kid Albums chart. It also entered the charts at number three on the Soundtracks chart, number 16 on Independent Albums, and number 90 on the overall Billboard 200. Within ten days of its release, the Zombies 4: Dawn of the Vampires soundtrack accumulated 30 million global audio streams, including 20 million on Spotify, 9 million on Apple Music, and 11 million on Amazon Music, totaling over 15 million hours of music streamed. On YouTube, fans watched more than 900,000 hours of soundtrack-related content. The film also generated significant social media activity, with over 35 million impressions and 4.4 million engagements on official accounts in the month following its release, alongside substantial user-generated content. Interest in the franchise remains high, with fans searching for news of a potential fifth installment on premiere day.
