= Josh A. Cagan =

American actor and writer

Josh A. Cagan is an actor and writer, best known as being a writer for the short lived animated series Undergrads.

== Filmography ==
=== As actor ===
- Undergrads (2001, as Rob Brody (8 episodes), Nerd 1, Nerd 2, Bobby Whiskey)
- ScriptGirl Report: High-atus (2008, 1 episode, as guest host)
- LearningTown (2013, 2 episodes, as Crew Member / Dumpster Dad)

=== As writer ===
- Undergrads (2001, 6 episodes)
- Kidz Bop: Everyone's a Star! (2003, video short)
- Zoé Kézako (2004, 2 episodes, collaboration)
- Linus (2008, short, written by)
- Bandslam (2009, screenplay/story)
- It Has Begun: Bananapocalypse (2012, short)
- Shelf Life (2013, 1 episode)
- The DUFF (2015, screenplay)
- Kim Possible (2019)
- Spin (2021)
- Zombies 4: Dawn of the Vampires (2025)
