= Silver Jeans Co. =

Canadian denim company

- Company type: Subsidiary
- Industry: Denim
- Founded: Winnipeg, Manitoba (1991)
- Headquarters: Winnipeg, Manitoba, Canada
- Key people: Michael Silver (President)
- Products: Denim; Outerwear; T-shirts
- Revenue: ▲US$ 150 million (FY 2015)
- Parent: Western Glove Works
- Website: www.silverjeans.com

Silver Jeans Co. is a designer denim company founded in Winnipeg, Manitoba, Canada in 1991 by Michael Silver. Silver Jeans Co. also produces outerwear and T-shirts. Silver Jeans is manufactured by Western Glove Works, a family-owned company that has produced denim products since 1921. Since 2002, manufacturing has been transferred to factories in Asia. The company also produces and owns Jag Jeans. Silver Jeans can be bought in North America. As of 2015, the company generates around $150 million a year.
