= Landmark Credit Union Live =

Music venue in Milwaukee, Wisconsin, US

Coordinates: 43.043912°N 87.916836°W

- Interactive map of Landmark Credit Union Live
- Address: 1051 North Vel R. Phillips Avenue; Milwaukee, WI 53203
- Location: Westown (Deer District)
- Owner: Frank Productions
- Capacity: 4,500
- Public transit: MCTS

Construction
- Groundbreaking: May 2024
- Opened: February 27, 2026

Website
- Venue website

Landmark Credit Union Live is an indoor concert venue in Milwaukee, Wisconsin. Located at 1051 North Vel R. Phillips Avenue, the venue is part of the "Deer District" development area that surrounds Fiserv Forum. Opened in 2026, it is owned and operated by FPC Live, a subsidiary of Frank Productions, which is itself a subsidiary of Live Nation Entertainment.

== History ==
The venue was built on part of the former site of the Bradley Center, home of the Milwaukee Bucks until 2018. After the Bucks built Fiserv Forum on the neighboring block, the Bradley Center was torn down in 2019. FPC Live, which is responsible for organizing concerts and entertainment events at Fiserv Forum, and the Bucks announced a joint venture on May 23, 2022, to build two concert venues on the vacant Bradley Center site. The larger of these was planned to seat 4,000, while the other was to seat 800.

Construction on the venue began in May 2024, although the 2024 Republican National Convention at Fiserv Forum prevented work from taking place for much of July that year. On October 8, 2025, it was announced that Landmark Credit Union, a credit union based in nearby Brookfield, had acquired the naming rights to the venue.

Landmark Credit Union Live first opened to the public with a "community preview event" on February 25, 2026. The venue's first performance was a concert by Rainbow Kitten Surprise on February 27.
