= Malachi Barton =

American actor (born 2007)

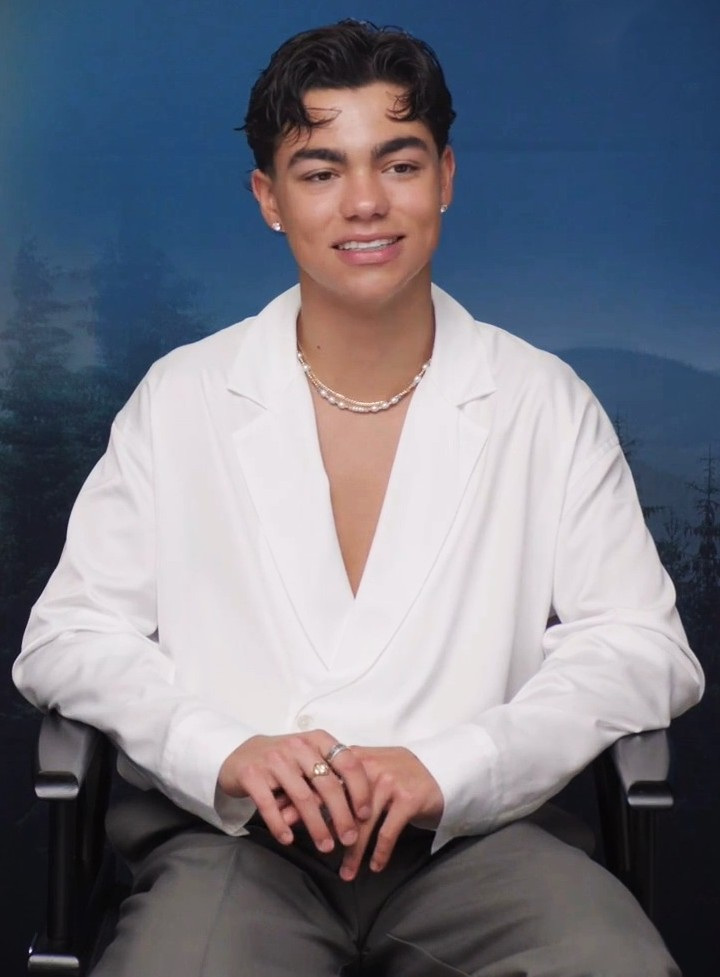
- Barton in 2025
- Born: Malachi Daniel Barton; March 10, 2007 (age 19); Virginia Beach, Virginia, U.S.
- Occupations: Actor; singer
- Years active: 2014–present
- Parents: Loren Barton (father); Felicia Barton (mother)

Malachi Daniel Barton (born March 10, 2007) is an American actor and singer. Known for his roles in Disney Channel productions, he first gained prominence starring in the television series Stuck in the Middle (2016–2018) as Beast Diaz. He also starred as Colby Madden in The Villains of Valley View (2022–2023) and voiced Lionel in the animated series Fancy Nancy (2018–2022).

Barton starred in several Disney Channel original films, including Marshall in Under Wraps (2021) and its sequel Under Wraps 2 (2022), Victor in Zombies 4: Dawn of the Vampires (2025) and its upcoming sequel Zombies 5: Secrets of the Sea (2027), Fletch in Camp Rock 3 (2026) and Jake in Coven Academy (2026)

== Early life ==
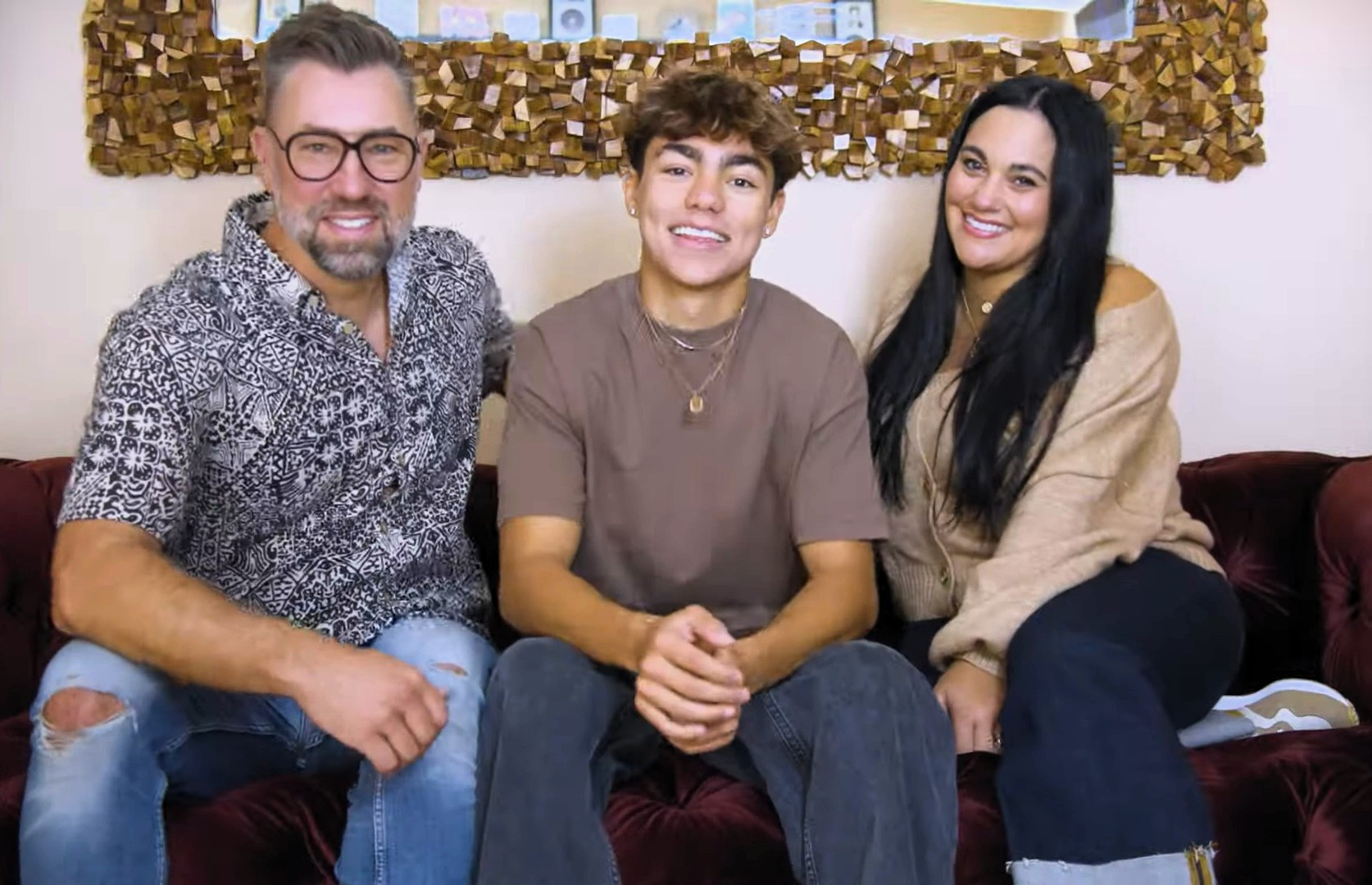
The Barton family in 2024

Barton is the only child of Felicia Barton, a singer-songwriter and former American Idol contestant, and Loren Barton, a guitarist and tour manager. Growing up in a musically and creatively driven household, Barton was exposed to the entertainment industry from an early age. He was encouraged by his parents as he started auditioning for television roles, eventually landing his first acting gigs in 2014. His family later relocated to Los Angeles to support his growing career, moving from Virginia Beach, allowing him to pursue acting professionally while continuing his education.

== Career ==
Barton began his acting career in 2014, making his television debut with a small role in the comedy series Workaholics. In 2015, he appeared in guest roles on See Dad Run, Instant Mom, and Henry Danger.

In 2016, Barton was cast as Beast Diaz in the Disney Channel sitcom Stuck in the Middle. The show ran for three seasons, concluding in 2018, during which he appeared in all episodes. In 2019, he played young Diego in the live-action film Dora and the Lost City of Gold. He voiced Lionel in the Disney Jr. animated series Fancy Nancy, Leo in Elena of Avalor, and has made appearances on Bunk'd and Just Roll with It. In 2021, he starred as Marshall in Under Wraps, a Halloween-themed remake of the 1997 film. In 2022, he reprised his role in the sequel Under Wraps 2.

From 2022 to 2023, Barton starred as Colby Madden/Flashform in the Disney Channel Original series The Villains of Valley View, a superhero comedy series. In 2024, it was confirmed that he had joined the cast of the Disney Channel Original movie Zombies 4: Dawn of the Vampires, the fourth film installment of the series. He played Victor, a vampire character, marking his debut in the fantasy/teen musical genre. He appeared with Freya Skye in the music video for "Snow Angels", their duet from Zombies 4.

Barton was a part of the Descendants/Zombies: Worlds Collide Tour. 2025 and also the Descendants/Zombies/Camp Rock: Worlds Collide Tour 2026. On August 15, 2025, it was announced that he was cast as Jake for the Disney+ and Disney Channel series Coven Academy, slated for release in 2026. In September 2025, it was announced that Malachi was cast as Fletch in Camp Rock 3, which was released in 2026.

== Filmography ==
Key
†	Denotes films that have not yet been released

=== Film ===
Year	Film	Role	Notes
2019	Dora and the Lost City of Gold	Young Diego	
2021	Under Wraps	Marshall	Television film
2022	Under Wraps 2	Marshall	Television film
2025	Zombies 4: Dawn of the Vampires	Victor	
2026	Camp Rock 3	Fletch Robinson	
2027	Zombies 5: Secrets of the Sea †	Victor	

=== Television ===
Year	Film	Role	Notes
2014	Workaholics	Tiny Kid	Episode: "We Be Clownin'"
2014	See Dad Run	Bobby	2 episodes
2015	Henry Danger	Eric	Episode: "Invisible Brad"
2015	Instant Mom	Trevor	Episode: "Two Guys and a Gabby"
2016–2018	Stuck in the Middle	Beast Diaz	Main role
2018–2022	Fancy Nancy	Lionel (voice)	Main role
2019	Super Powers Beat Down	Young Bruce Wayne	Episode: "Flashpoint Batman vs Killmonger"
2019	Bunk'd	Jasper Flores	Episode: "Lone Wolf"
2020	Just Roll with It	Tyber	Episode: "Owen and Blair in the Morning"
2020	Elena of Avalor	Leo (voice)	Episode: "Elena's Day Off"
2022–2023	The Villains of Valley View	Colby Madden / Flashform	Main role
2026	Locker Diaries: Zombies	Victor	Main role
2026	Descendants/Zombies Worlds Collide: Concert Special	Himself	Television special
2026	Coven Academy	Jake Dawson	Main role
2026	Locker Diaries: Camp Rock	Fletch	2 episodes
2026	Locker Diaries: Coven Academy	Jake Dawson	3 episode

== Discography ==
=== Singles ===
- Stay for the Credits (2026)

=== Soundtrack albums ===
- Zombies 4: Dawn of the Vampires (2025)
- Disney Descendants/Zombies: Worlds Collide Tour - The Live Album (2026)
- Camp Rock 3 (2026)

== Awards and nominations ==
Year	Association	Category	Nominated works	Result	Ref.
2017	Young Entertainer Awards	Best Supporting Young Actor	Stuck in the Middle	Nominated	
2018 2026	Young Entertainer Awards	Best Supporting Young Actor	Stuck in the Middle	Won	
