= Swayam Bhatia =

American actress (born 2007)

Swayam Ranjeet Bhatia
- Born: October 8, 2007 (age 19); New York City, New York, U.S.
- Occupation: Actress
- Years active: 2010–present

Swayam Ranjeet Bhatia (born October 8, 2007) is an American actress. She is best known for her television roles as Sophie Roy in the HBO drama series Succession and Sofi Hanson-Bhatt in the Disney+ sports comedy-drama The Mighty Ducks: Game Changers. She also portrays Vera in the Zombies film series and McKenna in Coven Academy.

== Background ==
Bhatia was born on October 8, 2007, to Indian parents. She was raised in Dubai, and New York City. She learned to drum in Dubai.

== Career ==
She began her professional career appearing in various commercial and guest roles, including appearances in Master of None and voice roles in animated children's series such as Mira, Royal Detective and Karma's World. From 2018 to 2023, she played Sophie Roy, the daughter of Kendall Roy, in a recurring capacity on HBO's critically acclaimed drama series Succession.

In 2021, Bhatia secured a main cast role in the first season of the Disney+ sequel series The Mighty Ducks: Game Changers, playing Sofi Hanson-Bhatt, a talented young hockey player.

Bhatia joined the Disney Channel Zombies franchise in 2025, starring as Vera, a vampire, in the musical fantasy television film Zombies 4: Dawn of the Vampires. In March 2026, Disney Branded Television announced that she would reprise her role as Vera in the upcoming sequel film Zombies 5: Secrets of the Sea. In mid-2026, she joined the cast of the "Worlds Collide Concert Tour," a live North American concert tour featuring talent from Disney musical franchises.

On August 15, 2025, Bhatia was announced to be cast in a recurring role for Coven Academy as McKenna.

== Filmography ==
=== Film and television ===
Year	Title	Role	Notes
2018–2023	Succession	Sophie Roy	Recurring role
2020	Mira, Royal Detective	Karishma	Voice role; episode: "The Case of the Missing Library Book"
2021-2022	The Mighty Ducks: Game Changers	Sofi Hanson-Bhatt	Main role
2022	Alice's Wonderland Bakery	Kyra	Voice role; episode: "Another Alice"
2025	Zombies 4: Dawn of the Vampires	Vera	Television film
2026	Locker Diaries: Zombies	Vera	7 episodes
2026	Coven Academy	McKenna	Recurring role, 16 episodes
2026	Locker Diaries: Coven Academy	McKenna	1 episode
2027	Zombies 5: Secrets of the Sea	Vera	Film; post-production
