= Coven Academy =

2026 American television series

- Genre: Supernatural; Teen drama
- Created by: Tim Federle
- Starring: Malina Weissman; Malachi Barton; Jordan Leftwich; Ora Duplass; Louis Thresher; Tiffani Thiessen
- Composer: Gabriel Mann
- Country of origin: United States
- Original language: English
- No. of seasons: 1
- No. of episodes: 21

Production
- Executive producers: Tim Federle; Todd Slavkin Darren Swimmer; Kimberly McCullough; Bronwyn North-Reist; Amanda Row
- Producer: Matthew Chipera
- Production location: Vancouver
- Cinematography: James Liston; C. Kim Miles
- Editors: Nicholas Erasmus; Debby Germino; Gordon Rempel
- Camera setup: Single-camera
- Running time: 25–43 minutes (TV); 10–22 minutes (streaming)
- Production companies: Chorus Boy Productions; Slavkin/Swimmer Productions; BearClaw Productions, Inc.; Disney Kids & Family

Original release
- Network: Freeform
- Release: October 1, 2026 – present

Coven Academy is an American supernatural teen drama television series created by Tim Federle, and produced by Disney Kids & Family for Freeform. The series follows three teenage witches, played by Malina Weissman, Jordan Leftwich, and Ora Duplass, who are students at an elite magic boarding school in New Orleans. The cast also includes Malachi Barton, Louis Thresher, and Tiffani Thiessen.

Development for the series started in March 2025 at Disney Channel, who originally ordered the project. It later moved to Freeform in August 2026. Filming took place in Vancouver, Canada.

The series premiered on October 1, 2026, on Freeform as part of the channel's 31 Nights of Halloween, while the full season was released the next day on Disney+ and Hulu with the episodes edited and split into a short-form format. It was renewed for a second season in October 2026.

== Premise ==
Set in New Orleans, Coven Academy follows three teenage witches-in-training and their warlock peers at an elite boarding school for magic. As they navigate supernatural conflicts, secrets, and forbidden romances, they must decide how far they are willing to go to protect their city and themselves.

== Cast ==
=== Main ===
- Malina Weissman as Briar Roberts, a young girl from Brooklyn with highly advanced telekinetic abilities who is sent to live and study at Coven Academy in New Orleans. Although hot-headed and stubborn, she is fiercely loyal and brave, readily embracing her new life as a witch and her new coven while searching for answers about her mother, Mary's, murder. At the conclusion of the finale, she is shocked and horrified to learn that even though Mary raised her, Miss Graves is her actual birth-mother.
- Malachi Barton as Jake Dawson, a rebellious and flirtatious warlock and one of Briar's love interests
- Jordan Leftwich as Sasha Baptiste, a dedicated and passionate witch with empathic and mind-manipulation powers and one of Briar's best friends and coven sisters. Principled and hardworking, she abhors being lied to and butts heads with Briar at first, but the two develop a harmony with one another. She almost transfers to the prestigious Coven Academy in Italy, but decides against it to remain with her coven.
- Ora Duplass as Tegan Kimball, a naïve but bubbly and good-natured witch with impressive time-bending powers and one of Briar's coven sisters. She is neurodivergent and has Attention deficit hyperactivity disorder (ADHD). She develops an instant rapport with Briar, helps her assimilate into Coven Academy and quickly becomes one of Briar's best friends. McKenna's love interest.
- Louis Thresher as Ollie, a handsome but insecure vampire and one of Briar's love interests
- Tiffani Thiessen as Miss Emma Graves, the firm but fair Headmistress of Coven Academy and former coven member of Mary Roberts and Tamora. A star pupil of Coven Academy in the 1990s, Emma is an extremely powerful and gifted witch, and a dedicated instructor and guardian of the students under her care. She has an unusual bond with Briar and is committed to ensuring that Briar remains at Coven Academy, even if that means giving Briar and her coven sisters scaled-down punishments for infractions. Her desire to keep Briar close is clarified at the conclusion of the finale when it is revealed that Emma is actually Briar's birth mother, and had to give her away to Mary for unknown reasons.

=== Recurring ===
- Brendon Tremblay as Alexander, a vampire and Ollie's mentor
- Swayam Bhatia as McKenna, Jake's stepsister and Tegan's love interest, a witch who clashes with Briar
- Keegan Connor Tracy as Tamora, a vampire-witch hybrid and former member of Briar's mother's coven
- BJ Harrison as Agnes, an immortal wise witch who teaches at Coven Academy
- Nathaniel Logan McIntyre as Teese, formerly Mason Baptiste, and Sasha's long-lost brother, a recently-turned vampire and friend of Alexander
- Cecelia Deacon as Mary Roberts, Briar's deceased mother
- Brandon McEwan as Dylan, a warlock prankster who is friends with Jake
- Tahmoh Penikett as William, an evil warlock with a hatred of "demon-blooded" beings
- John Innes as Mr. Kittridge, the Head Warlock of Coven Academy

=== Special guest star ===
- Devon Sawa as Mr. Peter Cole, a warlock and teacher at Coven Academy

== Episodes ==
| No. | Title | Directed by | Written by | Original release date | US viewers (millions) |
|---|---|---|---|---|---|
| 1 | "Hex Education / Blood, Sweat, and Fears / Mother of All Secrets" | Tim Federle | Tim Federle | October 1, 2026 | 0.13 |
Following the death of her mother Mary, Briar Robert is sent by her father to the Crescent Veil Academy in New Orleans, which trains witches and warlocks. There, she meets Headmistress Emma Graves, and befriends the witches Tegan and Sasha, the warlock Jake and the British man Ollie. Her arrival coincides with a conflict between the witches/warlocks and the vampires, and the disappearance of three witches. Unknown to Briar and Sasha, Ollie is secretly a vampire who is the nephew of the vampire leader Tamora, who is interested in Briar. Against Graves's orders, Briar accompanies Ollie on a haunted house tour. A conflicted Ollie helps her to escape from Tamora, who has disguised herself as the tour guide. Graves arrives and drives Tamora away. As punishment, she strips Briar, Tegan and Sasha of their powers for a week. Graves later confronts Tamora, who is revealed to have been a former witch who became a vampire hybrid. Tamora requests that Graves deliver Briar to her. While Ollie races to warn Briar that she is danger, Briar, her friends and Agnes conduct a seance with her late mother Mary to seek answers about her death.
| 2 | "Dead Ends / Power Trip" | Amanda Row | Zach Dodes | October 1, 2026 | 0.12 |
Following the seance, Briar seeks information about her late mother Mary and Tamora from Graves, who reveals that the trio were close friends at the Crescent Veil Academy before going their separate ways. Graves denies that Tamora was behind Mary's murder. Tamora punishes Ollie for attempting to warn Briar by stripping him of a spell allowing him to walk in sunlight. She tasks another vampire named Alexander with capturing Briar. While Graves and the warlock teacher Peter Cole raise the protective wards around the school, Jake uses a spell to restore Briar, Tegan and Sasha's powers. While Tegan and Sasha distract McKenna, Tamora lures Briar to her home using Ollie's mobile phone. Tamora is also revealed to have been responsible for the kidnapping of the three witches. At Tamora's home, Briar and Ollie find that she has been attacked and killed.
| 3 | "Roses are Red / Pick Your Poison" | Amanda Row | Sonali Mehta Bhandari | October 1, 2026 | 0.10 |
Inside Tamora's house, Jake and Briar rescue the three missing witches, who are returned to their families. Graves informs the school about their rescue and lifts the emergency ward. In private, Agnes and Briar warn Graves that the real killer is out there; with Briar noticing that Tamora shared the same patterns on her neck as her murdered mother Mary. Briar enlists Jake's help in finding Tamora's killer but discover the killer's identity is obscured by magic. Meanwhile, Alexander attempts to teach a reluctant Ollie how to hunt human prey. Using a map spell, Briar, Tegan and Sasha track Ollie down to a vampire's night club. Ollie protects the girls from being devoured by the vampires and reveals that Tamora was his aunt. Ollie is later expelled from the bar for refusing to consume human blood. Briar and her friends attend a Hex Night party where Sasha uses her powers to force Dylan to reverse a spell he placed on Tegan. Ollie later offers to help Briar find out more about her late mother Mary. Jake encounters an injured Cole while Graves burns a photo of Mary.
| 4 | "The Scrying Game / Trial by Fire" | Alexis Ostrander | Nancy Kiu | October 1, 2026 | 0.09 |
Peter Cole is revealed to be holding a male captive in his closet. Despite being aware of his true identity as a vampire and Tamora's nephew, Briar continues her romantic relationship with Ollie, who reveals he was a DJ in his mortal life. Meanwhile, Jake receives instruction in the "dark arts" of shapeshifting from Cole. Despite struggling with his romantic feelings for Briar, he perseveres. After receiving an omen, Graves sends Briar, Tegan and Sasha on a training exercise inside a maze. Briar stumbles during the exercise due to her feelings for Ollie, which causes friction with Sasha, whose brother was killed by a vampire. Deeming the girls unprepared, Agnes convinces Graves to end the exercise. Jake later teaches Briar how to shapeshift.
| 5 | "Time Warp / The Night It Happened" | Alexis Ostrander | Taylor Mallory | October 8, 2026 (Note: This episode was first released on Disney+ and Freeform's website on October 2, 2026.) | 0.09 |
| 6 | "Between Worlds / What She Saw" | Aprill Winney | Sonali Mehta Bhandari | October 8, 2026 | 0.08 |
| 7 | "Witchgiving / Cold Turkey" | Aprill Winney | Nneka Gerstle | October 8, 2026 | N/A |
| 8 | "1998 / Thicker Than Water" | Shannon Kohli | Chandler Turk | October 15, 2026 | 0.08 |
| 9 | "Winter Solstice / The Covening" | Shannon Kohli | Taylor Zuber | October 15, 2026 | 0.05 |
| 10 | "Bloodlines / After the Ashes" | Aprill Winney | Taylor Mallory & Todd Slavkin & Darren Swimmer | October 15, 2026 | 0.04 |

== Production ==
=== Development ===
On March 11, 2025, Disney Branded Television gave a pilot order to Coven Academy. Tim Federle serves as the creator and executive producer of the series. On August 15, 2025, the series was formally greenlit, with the cast also being announced. Federle wrote and directed the pilot, with Kimberly McCullough and Bronwyn North-Reist serving as executive producers. Shannon Kohli, Alexis Ostrander, and Aprill Winney directed episodes of the series. On October 26, 2026, Disney+ renewed the series for a second season.

=== Casting ===
On August 15, 2025, the main cast was announced, including Malina Weissman as Briar, Malachi Barton as Jake, Jordan Leftwich as Sasha, Ora Duplass as Tegan, Louis Thresher as Ollie, and Tiffani Thiessen as Miss Graves. Brendon Tremblay, Swayam Bhatia, and Keegan Connor Tracy were also cast in recurring roles.

On February 18, 2026, Devon Sawa joined the series in a special guest starring role as Mr. Cole.

=== Filming ===
Principal photography began on December 5, 2025, in Vancouver, and wrapped on March 5, 2026.

== Release ==
Coven Academy was originally planned for release on Disney Channel, but its release was later moved to Freeform.

The series premiered on October 1, 2026, on Freeform. The full season was released on October 2, 2026, on Disney+, Hulu, and Freeform's website. On Freeform, the first season was broadcast in a format of 10 episodes that run between 25 and 43 minutes, while on Disney+ and Hulu, the season was divided into 21 parts, dubbed as chapters, that run between 10–22 minutes.

== Reception ==
=== Critical response ===
On the review aggregator website Rotten Tomatoes, the series holds an approval rating of 100%, based on eight reviews, with an average of rated reviews of 7.9/10.

=== Ratings ===
On streaming, analytics firm FlixPatrol, which monitors daily updated VOD charts and streaming ratings worldwide, reported that Coven Academy ranked No. 1 among television series worldwide on Disney+ on October 4. The series recorded 11.4 million hours viewed globally for its first chapter during its first few days on Disney+ and Hulu. Nielsen Media Research, which records streaming viewership on certain U.S. television screens, announced that the viewership helped the series rank as the No.1 streaming series among viewers aged 12–17 over its premiere weekend and place among the top five shows across all age groups.

Coven Academy also gained attention on social media after Disney released the full first chapter on TikTok, Instagram, and YouTube on October 2–the same day as its Disney+ premiere. The release generated more than 30 million additional social media views, including 18 million on TikTok, 11 million on Instagram, and 2.4 million on YouTube.
