= Freya Skye =

English singer and actress (born 2009)

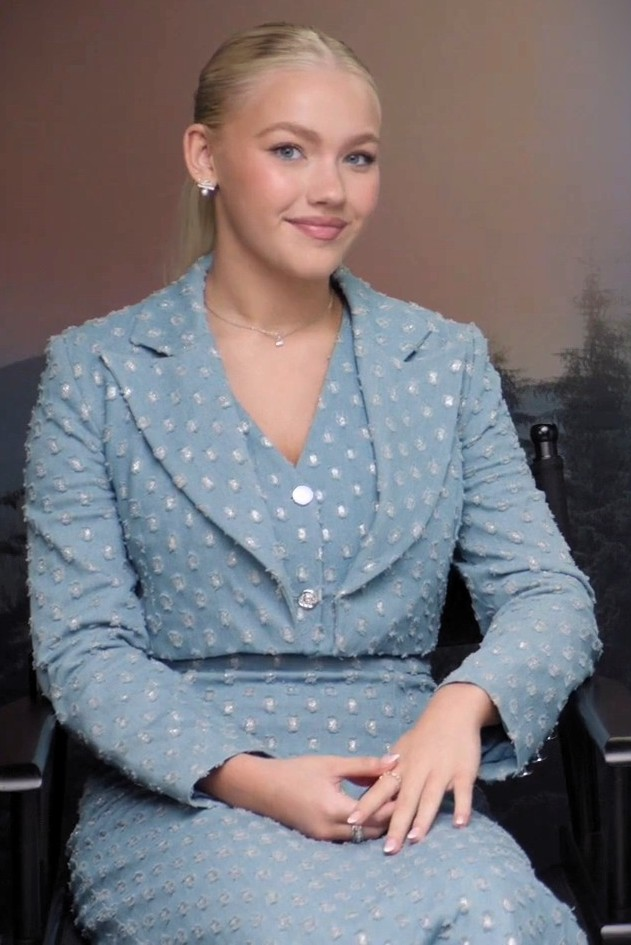
- Skye in 2025
- Born: Freya Skye Jones; 17 October 2009 (age 16); Buckinghamshire, England
- Occupations: Singer; actress
- Years active: 2020–present
- Notable work: Discography
- Musical career
- Instruments: Vocals; guitar; piano; recorder
- Label: Hollywood
- Website: freyaskye.com

Freya Skye (born 17 October 2009) is an English singer and actress. She represented the United Kingdom in the Junior Eurovision Song Contest 2022, after which she was signed to Hollywood Records. Skye also has a talent holding deal for projects with Disney Branded Television. As an actress, she has appeared in The Next Step and made her film debut starring as Nova Bright in Zombies 4: Dawn of the Vampires. As a musician, Skye has released a number of singles since 2020 and released her debut extended play Stardust in 2026 and embarked on her first headlining tour, the Stars Align Tour.

== Early life ==
Freya Skye was born on 17 October 2009 in Buckinghamshire, England. Skye started singing and acting at the age of five. Skye grew up near London, in Hertfordshire. She has a dog called Ruby. During the COVID-19 pandemic, Skye recorded songs, including "Famous" and "Show Some Love" and became known for posting with her father on social media. When she was thirteen, she was announced as the UK's entry in Junior Eurovision Song Contest 2022, at this time she attended Tring Park School for the Performing Arts.

== Career ==
=== 2022–2024: Junior Eurovision Song Contest 2022 and other activities ===
On 3 November 2022, it was announced that Skye would be representing the United Kingdom at the Junior Eurovision Song Contest 2022 in Yerevan, Armenia, to perform the song "Lose My Head". She won the top spot in the online global public vote, and finished fifth overall. She was featured in two BBC documentaries about her experience with Eurovision and her career, and was a part of the lineup at the London Eurovision Party 2023.

Skye has worked as a voice actor on video games including Final Fantasy XVI (2023). She appeared in the ninth season of the Canadian series The Next Step on YTV, playing an exaggerated version of herself, on that episode she sang her unreleased song "Love is a Lesson". In 2024, she was revealed to be playing Nova Bright in the film Zombies 4: Dawn of the Vampires. On 19 July 2024, she released the single "Walk Over" under Hollywood Records. It was followed by the singles "Someone to Love", and "Winter Dream".

=== 2025–present: Acting debut, Stardust and tour ===
In 2025, Skye released the singles "Can't Fake It", "Who I Thought I Knew" and "Gold's Gone".

In the summer, Zombies 4: Dawn of the Vampires was released, Skye contributed to the track "Worlds Collide" and Skye starred in the Descendants/Zombies: Worlds Collide Tour, an interactive live concert experience featuring stars from Disney's Descendants and Zombies franchises running from 17 July to 16 September. Skye also released the single "Golds Gone (Descendants/Zombies: World's Collide Tour Version)

In October 2025, Skye announced her first solo set of shows, Freya Skye: The Acoustic Shows, with four shows across LA, New York and London, that took place from December 2025 to January 2026.In November 2025, she appeared with Malachi Barton in the music video for "Snow Angels", their independent duet from Zombies 4 as it is not in the movie. In December 2025, she released the single "silent treatment". Days later, Skye announced her first solo tour of the US and Canada called The Stars Align Tour, which began in February 2026 with 15 shows across 12 states in the US and a show in Ontario. She performed at four of the 2025 iHeart Radio Jingle Balls around the US.

In early 2026, Skye announced a UK leg of her Stars Align Tour.

On 27 January 2026, Skye announced her first EP, Stardust, which was released on 4 February 2026. On the five-song EP, Skye worked with songwriters and producers including Julia Michaels, Mattman & Robin, and Johan Carlsson. Of the EP's title, Skye said, "The meaning just came to it being the songs on the EP are the 'stardust.' They're a bit broken when they're separated and they're a bit messy, very honest, but then when you put it together, it tells the full story. It just felt perfect." Stardust debuted at number 35 on the UK Albums Chart, and at number 74 on the Billboard 200 chart.

On 19 February 2026, it was announced that a further 36 new dates in the US, Europe, and Australia had been added to the tour, beginning in Brisbane, Australia on 7 June and ending in Madrid, Spain on 27 November 2026. 27 February 2026, Skye performed "Silent Treatment" on The Kelly Clarkson Show. On 7 April 2026, "Silent Treatment" entered the Billboard Hot 100 at number 98, peaking at number 88, and reached number 14 on the Pop Airplay chart.

Skye will reprise her role as Nova Bright in Zombies 5: Secrets of the Sea, which is due to be released in 2027. Skye was named to the 2026 Billboard 21 Under 21 list. In 2026, she was announced as the face of Hollister Co.'s Fall 2026 denim campaign. On 19 July, Alex Warren brought out Freya Skye to perform a duet of "Silent Treatment" at his concert. On 21 August, Skye announced "Bad Taste" as her next single. It was released on 16 September 2026.

== Discography ==
Extended plays

- Stardust (2026)

== Tours ==
Headlining

- The Acoustic Shows (2025-2026)
- Stars Align Tour (2026)

Co-headlining

- Descendants/Zombies: Worlds Collide Tour (2025)

== Filmography ==
Film
Year	Title	Role	Notes
2025	Zombies 4: Dawn of the Vampires	Nova Bright	Main role
2026	Descendants/Zombies Worlds Collide: Concert Special	Herself	Television special
2027	Zombies 5: Secrets of the Sea	Nova Bright	Post-production

Television
Year	Title	Role	Notes
2022	Junior Eurovision Song Contest 2022	Herself	Live Televised Competition
2024	The Next Step	Herself (fictional version)	Recurring role
2025	Wizards Beyond Waverly Place	Piper	2 episodes
2026	Locker Diaries: Zombies	Nova Bright	Main role

Video games
Year	Title	Role	Notes
2022	Dragon Quest Treasures	Mia	Voice role

Awards and achievements
Preceded by Joni Fuller with "How Does it Feel"	United Kingdom in the Junior Eurovision Song Contest; 2022	Succeeded by Stand Uniqu3 with "Back to Life"
