= Silent Treatment (Freya Skye song) =

Single by Freya Skye

from the EP Stardust
- Released: 2 December 2025
- Length: 2:22
- Label: Hollywood
- Songwriters: Freya Skye; Max Margolis; Sophie Alexandra Tweed-Simmons
- Producers: J Moon; Max Margolis

Freya Skye singles chronology
"Gold's Gone" (2025)	"Silent Treatment" (2025)	"Bad Taste" (2026)

"Silent Treatment" is a song by English singer-songwriter Freya Skye from her debut extended play (EP), Stardust (2026). It was released as the only single from the EP on 2 December 2025 by Hollywood Records.

== Background ==
About the song, Skye said:

"silent treatment is about someone very close to you and then them disappearing. I think a lot of us have gone through this, and I wrote the song during a time in my life when I was going through that with someone. I came into the studio on a day I was feeling particularly upset about it, but I'm super proud of the result."

== Critical reception ==
Nmesoma Okechukwu of Euphoria Magazine called it "the product of having a lover decide they no longer want to be with you without even bothering to explain why". Clare Gehlich of Melodic Magazine noted that on the song, "Skye sets herself as an emerging pop voice capable of combining polished and powerful vocals with honest emotion".

== Live performances ==
Skye performed "Silent Treatment" on The Kelly Clarkson Show on 27 February 2026.

== Charts ==
Chart performance
Chart (2025–2026)	Peak position
Belgium (Ultratop 50 Flanders)	19
Canada CHR/Top 40 (Billboard)	18
Canada Hot AC (Billboard)	37
Denmark Airplay (Tracklisten)	7
New Zealand Hot Singles (RMNZ)	21
Portugal Airplay (AFP)	25
US Billboard Hot 100	88
US Adult Contemporary (Billboard)	13
US Adult Pop Airplay (Billboard)	32
US Pop Airplay (Billboard)	14
Venezuela Anglo Airplay (Monitor Latino)	9
