= Mekonnen Knife =

Australian actor (born 2006)

- Born: 6 July 2006 (age 20); Gerje Gefersa, Ethiopia
- Other name: MK
- Occupation: Actor
- Years active: 2019–present

Mekonnen Knife (born 6 July 2006) is an Ethiopian-born Australian actor. He is best known for his role as Vargas in Disney's Zombies 4: Dawn of the Vampires.

== Early life ==
MK was born in Gerje Gefersa, Ethiopia and spent the early years of his life there before moving to Australia at the age of seven where he grew up on the Gold Coast with his twin sister. He initially pursued modelling in his younger years until he was encouraged to enroll in performing arts dance school at Dynamite Studios on the Gold Coast and shortly after landed his first role as 'Wolfie' at Dracula's Cabaret at 12 years old. As of 2026, Knife continues to be based on the Gold Coast and has stated that he "loves" the city and does not intend to leave, instead opting to travel to the United States for his acting career.

== Career ==
Knife began his television career in 2020 when he spent two years hosting Network 10's Shake Takes. He landed his first breakthrough role in 2025 when he was cast as Vargas in Disney's Zombies 4: Dawn of the Vampires. He was awarded the inaugural Rabanne Breakthrough Artist Award at the 2026 AACTA Awards in recognition of being one of Australia's fastest rising acting talents.
