= Zombies 4: Dawn of the Vampires =

2025 musical television film

- Promotional release poster
- Based on: Characters created by David Light & Joseph Raso
- Screenplay by: David Light & Joseph Raso; Josh Cagan
- Story by: David Light & Joseph Raso
- Directed by: Paul Hoen
- Starring: Meg Donnelly; Milo Manheim; Kylee Russell; Chandler Kinney; Malachi Barton; Freya Skye; Julian Lerner; Swayam Bhatia; Mekonnen Knife; Lisa Chappell; Jonno Roberts
- Composer: Tom Howe
- Country of origin: United States
- Original language: English

Production
- Executive producers: David Light & Joseph Raso; Meg Donnelly; Milo Manheim; Paul Hoen; Jane Fleming; Mark Ordesky
- Producer: Skot Bright
- Production location: Auckland, New Zealand Toronto, Ontario (some scenes)
- Cinematography: Carlos González
- Editor: Lisa Binkley
- Running time: 88 minutes
- Production companies: Bloor Street Productions; Court Five; Night Zone Productions; Disney Branded Television

Original release
- Network: Disney Channel
- Release: July 10, 2025

Related
- Zombies (2018); Zombies 2 (2020); Zombies 3 (2022); Zombies: The Re-Animated Series (2024); Zombies 5: Secrets of the Sea (2027)

Zombies 4: Dawn of the Vampires (Note: Stylized with hyphens as Z-O-M-B-I-E-S 4: Dawn of the Vampires) is a 2025 American musical vampire film. It is the sequel to the 2022 film Zombies 3 and the fourth installment in the Zombies film series. It stars Meg Donnelly and Milo Manheim reprising their lead roles as Addison and Zed, respectively, along with Malachi Barton and Freya Skye as the new characters Victor and Nova, respectively. The film premiered on Disney Channel on July 10, 2025, and was released on Disney+ the following day. Zombies 4: Dawn of the Vampires received 9.3 million global views within its first ten days of release on Disney+.

== Plot ==
Zed, Addison, Eliza, and Willa have finished their freshman year at Mountain College. Zed and Addison have spent most of the year dedicated to their respective sports, football and cheerleading. Both have been so focused on succeeding that they have spent almost no time with each other or with their other friends. Zed plans on going to a summer football camp to prove he is worthy of “first string” status, while Addison plans on going to a summer cheer camp to make herself competitive for cheer captain.

Zed, Addison, Eliza, and Willa take a road trip to their respective summer destinations when a mysterious energy surge causes Zed’s Z-band to malfunction, running their car off the road. The crash leaves the group lost in an unknown area, and they split up to find help.

Zed encounters a new group of monsters, the Daywalkers, led by Commander Bright. Addison encounters the Vampires, led by the Vampire Eldress. The two groups have a longstanding rivalry from competing over a shared and dwindling food/energy source: Blood Fruit. Nova and Victor, young leaders in training, each face pressure from their elders to do whatever it takes to secure Blood Fruit for their clan, despite experiencing mysterious visions of each other.

The Daywalkers and Vampires arrive to the Blood Fruit orchard at the same time, alongside Eliza and Willa, but the gate to the orchard is locked. While searching for clues on how to unlock the gate, the young groups of Daywalkers, led by Nova, and Vampires, led by Victor, settle into the abandoned Camp Rayburn, a camp where the ancestors of Daywalkers and Vampires used to co-exist. At the camp, Nova and Victor meet and start remembering their visions.

Zed, Addison, Eliza, and Willa find themselves acting as camp counselors between the two opposing groups, hoping to convince them to work together. Nova and Victor bond over their shared visions of each other, believing something supernatural is drawing them together. Meanwhile, the mysterious energy surges continue, threatening harm to zombies and werewolves far beyond the camp.

The Daywalkers and the Vampires slowly begin to work together and are ultimately able to overcome their differences and open the gate to the Blood Fruit orchard. However, when the elders arrive, they are shocked to see the two groups working together and begin to fight, inadvertently burning half the orchard down. The elders declare war on each other, and the two groups separate.

Zed, Eliza, and Willa discover that the dying Blood Fruit roots are what is causing the dangerous energy surges. Nova and Victor believe that uniting their peoples’ moonstones will help heal the roots and stop the energy surges, but they fear doing so would be an impossible task. Addison and a weakened Zed “pass the torch” and encourage them to make the impossible possible.

The Daywalkers and the Vampires work together to rebel against the elders and are able to unite their moonstones, which heals the roots, stopping the energy surges, ending the feud between the two groups, and causing miraculous Blood Fruit growth. The united monsters celebrate the accomplishment.

Zed and Addison reflect on their experience and decide to spend the rest of the summer with loved ones, choosing to value relationships over personal achievement. Nova and Victor promise to remain in touch, but before they go their separate ways, Nova approaches Victor to give him a hug. As they embrace, they witness a supernatural water spout form over the ocean.

== Cast ==
- Meg Donnelly as Addison Wells
- Milo Manheim as Zed Necrodopolis
- Kylee Russell as Eliza Zambi
- Chandler Kinney as Willa Lykensen
- Malachi Barton as Victor
- Freya Skye as Nova Bright
- Julian Lerner as Ray
- Swayam Bhatia as Vera
- Mekonnen Knife as Vargas
- Lisa Chappell as Vampire Eldress
- Jonno Roberts as Commander Bright
- Dustin Clapier as Vampire 2

== Production ==
On November 22, 2023, Production Weekly revealed that a fourth Zombies film was in-development, with Milo Manheim and Meg Donnelly reprising their roles as Zed and Addison respectively. Paul Hoen would also return to direct the new entry, alongside co-production with Bloor Street Productions following their prior involvement with the previous two installments. Unlike the other films however, Zombies 4 was filmed in Auckland, New Zealand, instead of Toronto, Canada.

The film was officially greenlit on February 10, 2024, with Chandler Kinney and Kylee Russell returning as Willa and Eliza, respectively. Freya Skye joined the cast as Nova and Malachi Barton was cast as Victor. Principal photography began on March 26, 2024 in New Zealand, with Swayam Bhatia, Julian Lerner, Mekonnen Knife, Lisa Chappell, and Jonno Roberts rounding out as Vera, Ray, Vargas, Eldress, and Commander Bright, respectively.

== Music ==
Zombies 4: Dawn of the Vampires features 13 songs. The first single "The Place to Be" was released on May 2, 2025, along with the pre-order of the soundtrack. The second single "Don't Mess with Us" was released on June 13, 2025.

Additionally, a music video inspired from the movie was released in late November 2025 entitled 'Snow Angels'. It features Freya Skye and Malachi Barton, both of whom star in the original movie.

== Reception ==
=== Viewership ===
Zombies 4: Dawn of the Vampires garnered 9.3 million views globally within its first ten days on Disney+. However, a sing-along version was released on there on October 17, and viewers were invited to follow the bouncing box with songs from the movie. Streaming analytics firm FlixPatrol, which monitors daily updated VOD charts and streaming ratings across the globe, reported that the film was the most-streamed title on Disney+ in the U.S. following its release. Zombies 4 also remained the top-ranked title globally on Disney+ for the week ending July 14, with Zombies and Zombies 2 ranked fourth and eighth, respectively. In the U.S., all four films in the franchise occupied the top four positions on the platform, with Zombies 4 ranking No. 1. Nielsen Media Research, which records streaming viewership on some U.S. television screens, calculated that Zombies 4 recorded 274 million minutes of watch time from July 7–13, ranking as the seventh most-streamed film that week. The following week, from July 14–20, the film was streamed for 284 million minutes, maintaining its seventh-place position. TVision, which tracks viewer attention, program reach, and engagement across more than 1,000 CTV apps, announced that Zombies 4 was the fourteenth most-streamed film during the month of July.

=== Critical response ===
Natalie Dean of Plugged In stated that Zombies 4 successfully continues the franchise's tradition of fun, musical storytelling while serving as a heartfelt passing of the torch to a new generation of characters. She highlighted how the film follows Zed and Addison after their freshman year of college as they mentor newcomers Nova and Victor, encouraging teamwork and understanding between previously rival monster factions. Dean praised the film's positive messages about friendship, leadership, and embracing differences, noting that the characters' growth and cooperation drive the story. She also emphasized the franchise's signature elements—catchy songs, vibrant choreography, and magical worldbuilding—while noting that the film sets up an exciting new chapter for the series with potential spinoffs. Tessa Smith of Mama's Geeky said that Zombies 4 delivers catchy songs, vibrant choreography, and an engaging story, while also serving as a bittersweet passing of the torch to a new generation. She highlighted the emotional farewell to Zed and Addison, praising Milo Manheim and Meg Donnelly's performances and noting the film's careful focus on familiar characters alongside newcomers Nova and Victor. Smith complimented the chemistry and performances of Freya Skye and Malachi Barton, suggesting they are well-suited to carry the franchise forward. She also noted the soundtrack as among the best in the series, with musical numbers likely to inspire TikTok trends.

Polly Conway of Common Sense Media gave Zombies 4 a grade of three out of five stars, saying that the film delivers a fun, musical story while emphasizing positive messages about acceptance, teamwork, and friendship. She noted that Addison and Zed serve as positive role models, embracing new experiences and helping their new friends without judgment. Conway also highlighted the franchise's commitment to diverse representation, reinforcing the series' themes of inclusion and understanding. Brennan Klein of Screen Rant asserted that Zombies 4 continues the franchise's trademark mix of corny charm, dazzling musical numbers, and vibrant production design. He noted that while the film's attempt to introduce a new generation of characters—Nova and Victor—sometimes reduces the focus on fan favorites Zed and Addison, Manheim and Donnelly deliver their best performances yet, bringing humor and emotional depth to their roles. Klein praised the choreography and inventive musical sequences, highlighting standout numbers like "Kerosene" for its energetic vocal performance and inventive staging. However, he observed that the film plays it safer than previous installments.

=== Impact ===
Within ten days of its release, the Zombies 4: Dawn of the Vampires soundtrack accumulated 30 million global audio streams, including 20 million on Spotify, 9 million on Apple Music, and 11 million on Amazon Music, totaling over 15 million hours of music streamed. On YouTube, fans watched more than 900,000 hours of soundtrack-related content. The film also generated significant social media activity, with over 35 million impressions and 4.4 million engagements on official accounts in the month following its release, alongside substantial user-generated content. Building on this addition, the film's musical sequences and choreography contributed to a wider audience across all digital platforms. On TikTok, short-form videos were created for content that featured the songs that were inspired from the film, with users and creators recreating dances and sharing clips inspired by the film. Fan edits and character-focused videos circulated the internet, as well as some of the cast and character moments circulated the internet, which helped increase visibility for the film across social media. The introduction of new characters, Nova (played by Freya Skye) and Victor (played by Malachi Barton), also contributed to the franchise development, which expanded the story for future films. These trends are a part of the larger Zombies franchise which reached bigger audiences through engagement and social media even after the release of the film.

=== Accolades ===
Award	Date of ceremony	Category	Recipient(s)	Results	Ref.
Hollywood Music in Media Awards	November 19, 2025	Music Themed Film, Biopic or Musical	Paul Hoen	Nominated	
AACTA Awards	February 6, 2026	Audience Choice Award for Breakthrough Artist	Mekonnen Knife	Won	
iHeartRadio Music Awards	March 19, 2026	Favorite Soundtrack	Zombies 4: Dawn of the Vampires	Nominated	
Nickelodeon Kids' Choice Awards	November 14, 2026	Watch Party: Kids' Choice	Zombies 4: Dawn of the Vampires	Won	
Artios Awards	February 18, 2027	Live Action Children & Family Program for Television	Zombies 4: Dawn of the Vampires	Pending	

== Sequel ==
On March 2, 2026, Disney Branded Television greenlit a fifth film, Zombies 5: Secrets of the Sea, with production due to begin in New Zealand that spring. Meg Donnelly and Milo Manheim will not reprise their roles; however, they will return as executive producers. The film is scheduled to be released in mid-2027.
