= List of songs recorded by Jonas Brothers =

A complete list of songs released or performed by the American pop band Jonas Brothers.

== Performed by Jonas Brothers ==
Song title	Songwriter(s)	Album	Year
0-9
"6 Minutes"	Joe Belmaati, Rich Cronin, Ken Gioia, Michael Hansen, Sheppard	It's About Time	2006
"7:05"	Joe Jonas, Kevin Jonas, Nick Jonas, Michael Mangini	It's About Time	2006
A
"A Little Bit Longer"	Nick Jonas	A Little Bit Longer	2008
"American Dragon"	Jonas Brothers	Non-album release	2008
"Americana"	Jonas Brothers, Jon Bellion, Jordan K. Johnson, Stefan Johnson, Alexander Izquierdo, Peter Nappi, Jason Cornet	The Album	2023
"Australia"	Jonas Brothers	Jonas Brothers	2007
B
"Baby Bottle Pop Theme Song"	Topps Co.	Jonas Brothers (Wal-Mart Exclusive)	2008
"BB Good"	Jonas Brothers, John Taylor	A Little Bit Longer	2008
"Beautiful World"	Sons Of Jonas	Non-album release	
"Before the Storm" (with Miley Cyrus)	Jonas Brothers, Miley Cyrus	Lines, Vines and Trying Times	2009
"Black Keys"	Nick Jonas	Lines, Vines and Trying Times	2009
"Bounce"	Nick Jonas	Non-album release	2009
"Burnin' Up"	Jonas Brothers	A Little Bit Longer	2008
C
"Can't Have You"	Nick Jonas, PJ Bianco	A Little Bit Longer	2008
"Celebrate!"	Jonas Brothers, Jon Bellion, Jordan K. Johnson, Stefan Johnson, Alexander Izquierdo, Peter Nappi, Jason Cornet, Michael Pollack	The Album	2023
"Chillin' in the Summertime"	Joe Acosta, Ben Burgess, Sean D. McCarthy	Jonas L.A.	2010
"Come On Over" (as Connect 3)	Antonina Armato, Tim James Price, Adam Schmalholz, Thomas Armato Sturges	Camp Rock 3 (soundtrack)	2026
"Comeback"	Jonas Brothers, Sylvester Sivertsen, James Ghaleb	Happiness Begins	2019
"Cool"	Jonas Brothers, Ryan Tedder, Zach Skelton, Casey Smith	Happiness Begins	2019
"Critical"	Johan Alkenas, Niclas Molinder, Joacim Persson, Geraldo Sandell	Jonas L.A.	2010
D
"Dance Until Tomorrow"		Non-album release	2011
"Don't Charge Me for the Crime" (with Common)	Jonas Brothers, Ryan Liestman, Lonnie Lynn	Lines, Vines and Trying Times	2009
"Don't Say"		Unreleased	2013
"Don't Speak"	Jonas Brothers, John Fields	Lines, Vines and Trying Times	2009
"Don't Tell Anyone"	Jonas Brothers	It's About Time	2005
"Don't Throw It Away"	Nick Jonas, Joe Jonas, Greg Kurstin, Maureen McDonald	Happiness Begins	2019
"Drive"	Nick Jonas, Matthew Gerrard, Robbie Nevil	Jonas L.A.	2010
"Drive My Car"	Lennon–McCartney, John Lennon, Paul McCartney	Non-album release	2010
E
"Eu Não Mudaria Nada em Você" (Jullie ft. Joe Jonas)	Adam Anders, Nikki Hassman, Peer Astrom	Camp Rock 2: The Final Jam (soundtrack)	2010
"Eternity"	Jonas Brothers	Non-album release	2007
"Every Single Time"	Nick Jonas, Joe Jonas, Greg Kurstin, Maureen McDonald	Happiness Begins	2019
F
"Fall"	Nick Jonas, Adam Anders, Jess Cates	Jonas L.A.	2010
"Feelin' Alive"	Michael Busbee, John T. Harding	Jonas L.A.	2010
"First"	Joe Jonas, Homer Steinweiss, Justin Tranter, Kennedi Lykken, Mike Sabath	Happiness Begins (Target Exclusive)	2019
"First Time"	Joe Jonas, Kevin Jonas, Nick Jonas, Paul Phamous	Non-album release	2013
"Five More Minutes"	Jonas Brothers, James Ghaleb, Zach Skelton, Brittany Amaradio, Casey Smith	Non-album release	2020
"Fly with Me"	Jonas Brothers, Greg Garbowsky	Lines, Vines and Trying Times	2009
"Found"	Nick Jonas	Live	2013
G
"Games"	Jonas Brothers, Greg Garbowsky, John Taylor	Jonas Brothers	2007
"Girl of My Dreams"	Jonas Brothers	Disney Channel Holiday	2007
"Give Love a Try"	Jonas Brothers	JONAS	2008
"Goodnight and Goodbye"	Jonas Brothers	Jonas Brothers	2007
"Got Me Going Crazy"	Nick Jonas	A Little Bit Longer	2008
"Gotta Find You"	Adam Watts, Andy Dodd	Camp Rock	2008
H
"Happy When I'm Sad"	Nick Jonas, Joel Little, Sarah Aarons	Happiness Begins	2019
"Heart And Soul	Antonina Armato, Tim James, Steve Rushton, Aaron Dudley	Camp Rock 2: The Final Jam (soundtrack)	2010
"Hello Beautiful"	Jonas Brothers	Jonas Brothers	2007
"Hello, Goodbye"	John Lennon, Paul McCartney	A Little Bit Longer (Target Exclusive)	2008
"Hesitate"	Joe Jonas, Justin Tranter, Kennedi Lykken, Mike Sabath	Happiness Begins	2019
"Hey Baby"	Jonas Brothers	Lines, Vines and Trying Times	2009
"Hey You"	Johan Alkenas, Niclas Molinder, Joacim Persson, Drew Ryan Scott	Jonas L.A.	2010
"Hold On"	Jonas Brothers	Jonas Brothers	2007
"Hollywood"	Jonas Brothers, John Fields	Jonas Brothers	2007
I
"I Am What I Am"	Adam Schlesinger	It's About Time	2006
"I Believe"	Nick Jonas, Greg Kurstin, Maureen McDonald	Happiness Begins	2019
"I Wanna Be Like You"	Sherman Brothers	DisneyMania 5	2007
"I'm Gonna Getcha Good"	Robert John "Mutt" Lange, Shania Twain	Jonas Brothers: The 3D Concert Experience (soundtrack)	2009
"Infatuation"	Jonas Brothers	A Little Bit Longer (Japanese Edition)	2008
"Inseparable"	Jonas Brothers, Joshua Miller	Jonas Brothers	2007
"Introducing Me" (Nick Jonas)	Jamie Houston	Camp Rock 2: The Final Jam (soundtrack)	2010
"Invisible"	Nick Jonas, Adam Anders, Zac Poor	Jonas L.A.	2010
J
"Joyful Kings"	Isaac Watts, Lowell Mason	All Wrapped Up	2008
"Just Friends"	Jonas Brothers	Jonas Brothers	2007
K
"Kids of the Future"	Marty Wilde, Ricky Wilde	Jonas Brothers	2007
L
"L.A. Baby (Where Dreams Are Made Of)"	Nick Jonas, Johan Alkenas, Niclas Molinder, Joacim Persson, Drew Ryan Scott	Jonas L.A.	2010
"Leave Before You Love Me"	Marshmello, Jonas Brothers		2021
"Let's Go"		Unreleased	2013
"Like It's Christmas"	Jonas Brothers, Gian Stone, Jason Evigan, Freddy Wexler, Mike Elizondo, Annika Wells	Non-album release	2019
"Little Bird"	Jonas Brothers, Jon Bellion, Jordan K. Johnson, Stefan Johnson, Peter Nappi, Jason Cornet, Michael Pollack, Gregory Hein	The Album	2023
"Live to Party"	Jonas Brothers	A Little Bit Longer (Wal-Mart Exclusive)	2008
"Love Her"	Jonas Brothers, Mike Elizondo	Happiness Begins	2019
"Love Is on Its Way"	Jonas Brothers, Kevin Jonas Sr.	Jonas Brothers: The 3D Concert Experience (soundtrack)	2009
"Lovebug"	Jonas Brothers	A Little Bit Longer	2008
M
"Make a Wave" (Joe Jonas and Demi Lovato)	Scott Krippayne, Jeffrey D Peabody	Non-album release	2010
"Make It Right"	Nick Jonas, Andy Dodd, Adam Watts	Jonas L.A.	2010
"Mandy"	Jonas Brothers	It's About Time	2006
"Meet You In Paris"		Unreleased	2013
"Miracle"	Jonas Brothers, Jon Bellion, Jordan K. Johnson, Stefan Johnson, Alexander Izquierdo, Peter Nappi, Jason Cornet	The Album	2023
"Montana Sky"	Jonas Brothers, Jon Bellion, Jordan K. Johnson, Stefan Johnson, Peter Nappi, Jason Cornet, Gregory Hein, James Gutch	The Album	2023
"Much Better"	Jonas Brothers	Lines, Vines and Trying Times	2009
N
"Nada Vou Mudar" (Mia Rose ft. Joe Jonas)	Adam Anders, Nikki Hassman, Peer Astrom	Camp Rock 2: The Final Jam (soundtrack)	2010
"Neon"		Live	
O
"On the Line" (with Demi Lovato)	Jonas Brothers, Demi Lovato	Don't Forget	2008
"One Day at a Time"	Jonas Brothers, Steve Greenberg, Michael Mangini	It's About Time	2006
"One Man Show"	Jonas Brothers	A Little Bit Longer	2008
"Only Human"	Jonas Brothers, Karl Schuster	Happiness Begins	2019
"Out of This World"	Jonas Brothers	Jonas Brothers (UK Edition), A Little Bit Longer (Best Buy Exclusive)	2007
P
"Paranoid"	Jonas Brothers, Cathy Dennis, John Fields	Lines, Vines and Trying Times	2009
"Play My Music"	Mitch Allan, Kara DioGuardi	Camp Rock (soundtrack)	2008
"Please Be Mine"	Jonas Brothers	It's About Time	2006
"Poison Ivy"	Jonas Brothers, Greg Garbowsky	Lines, Vines and Trying Times	2009
"Pom Poms"	Jonas Brothers, Paul Phamous	Released as a single	2013
"Poor Unfortunate Souls"	Howard Ashman, Alan Menken	The Little Mermaid Special Edition	2006
"Pushin' Me Away"	Jonas Brothers	A Little Bit Longer	2008
Q
R
"Remember This"	Jonas Brothers	Non-album release	2021
"Rollercoaster"	Ryan Tedder, Zach Skelton, Jonas Jeberg, Michael Pollack, Casey Smith	Happiness Begins	2019
S
"Sail Away"	Jonas Brothers, Jon Bellion, Jordan K. Johnson, Stefan Johnson, Peter Nappi, Jason Cornet, Michael Pollack, Calle Lehmann	The Album	2023
"Sandbox"	Nick Jonas, Paul Phamous	Unreleased	2013
"Send It On" (with Disney's Friends for Change: Miley Cyrus, Demi Lovato, Selena Gomez)	Adam Anders, Nikki Hassman, Peter Astrom	Non-album release	2009
"Set This Party Off"	Nick Jonas, Mitch Allan, Kara DioGuardi	Jonas L.A.	2010
"Shelf"	Jonas Brothers	A Little Bit Longer	2008
"Should've Said No" (Taylor Swift ft. Jonas Brothers)	Taylor Swift	Jonas Brothers: the 3D Concert Experience (soundtrack)	2009
"Sorry"	Jonas Brothers, John Fields	A Little Bit Longer	2008
"SOS"	Nick Jonas	Jonas Brothers	2007
"Still in Love with You"	Jonas Brothers	Jonas Brothers	2007
"Strangers"	Nick Jonas, Joe Jonas, Greg Kurstin, Maureen McDonald	Happiness Begins	2019
"Strong Enough" (with Bailey Zimmerman)	Jonathan Bellion, Jordan K. Johnson, Stefan Johnson, Thomas Hull, Sir Michael Jagger, Keith Richards, Michael Pollack, Amy Allen	Non-album release	2023
"Sucker"	Jonas Brothers, Ryan Tedder, Adam Feeney, Louis Bell	Happiness Begins	2019
"Summer Baby"	Jonas Brothers, Jon Bellion, Jordan K. Johnson, Stefan Johnson, Peter Nappi, Jason Cornet, Michael Pollack, Gregory Hein	The Album	2023
"Summer in the Hamptons"	Jonas Brothers, Jon Bellion, Peter Nappi, Jason Cornet, Gregory Hein, Felicia Ferraro, Elisha Noll	The Album	2023
"Summer Rain"	Andy Dodd, Adam Watts	Jonas L.A.	2010
"Summertime Anthem"	Jonas Brothers	All Wrapped Up Vol. 2	2009
T
"Take a Breath"	Jonas Brothers	Jonas Brothers (UK Edition, The Bonus Jonas Edition)	2007
"Take On Me"	A-ha	Unreleased	2005
"That's Just the Way We Roll"	Jonas Brothers, William McCauley III	Jonas Brothers	2007
"The World"		Live	2013
"Things Will Never Be the Same"	Nick Jonas, Johan Alkenas, Niclas Molinder, Joacim Persson, Drew Ryan Scott, John Taylor	Jonas L.A.	2010
"This Is Me" (Demi Lovato ft. Joe Jonas)	Adam Watts, Andy Dodd	Camp Rock (soundtrack), Jonas Brothers: The 3D Concert Experience (soundtrack)	2008
"This Is Our Song" (Demi Lovato, Joe Jonas, Nick Jonas, Alyson Stoner)	Adam Watts, Andy Dott	Camp Rock 2: The Final Jam (soundtrack)	2010
"Time for Me to Fly"	Jonas Brothers, Kevin Jonas Sr., P.J. Bianco	It's About Time	2006
"Tonight"	Jonas Brothers, Greg Garbowsky	A Little Bit Longer	2008
"Trust"	Nick Jonas, Joe Jonas, Ryan Tedder, Jason Evigan, Ammar Malik	Happiness Begins	2019
"Turn Right"	Jonas Brothers	Lines, Vines and Trying Times	2009
U
"Underdog"	Jonas Brothers, J. Gates, Stargate	It's About Time	2006
"Used to Be"	Nick Jonas, Ryan Tedder, Louis Bell, Zach Skelton	Happiness Begins	2019
V
"Vacation Eyes"	Jonas Brothers, Jon Bellion, Peter Nappi, Jason Cornet	The Album	2023
"Video Girl"	Jonas Brothers	A Little Bit Longer	2008
W
"Waffle House"	Jonas Brothers, Jon Bellion, Peter Nappi, Jason Cornet, Daniel Tashian, Ido Zmishlany, Johnny Simpson, Gregory Hein	The Album	2023
"Walls" (featuring Jon Bellion)	Jonas Brothers, Jon Bellion, Peter Nappi, Jason Cornet, Johnny Simpson, Clyde Lawrence, Jordan Cohen, Felicia Ferraro, Andrea Rosario, Douglas Davis	The Album	2023
"We Are The World"	Michael Jackson, Lionel Richie	We Are The World 25 for Haiti	2010
"Wedding Bells"	Nick Jonas	Live	2013
"We Got the Party" (with Hannah Montana)	Kara DioGuardi, Greg Wells	Jonas Brothers (The Bonus Jonas Edition), Hannah Montana 2: Rock Star Edition	2007
"We Rock"	Kara DioGuardi, Greg Wells	Camp Rock (soundtrack)	2008
"What a Man Gotta Do"	Jonas Brothers, Ryan Tedder	Non-album release	2020
"What Did I Do to Your Heart"	Jonas Brothers	Lines, Vines and Trying Times	2009
"What Do I Mean to You"	Nick Jonas	Live	2013
"What I Go To School For"	Busted	It's About Time	2006
"What We Came Here For" (Demi Lovato, Joe Jonas, Nick Jonas, Alyson Stoner, Anna Maria Perez de Taglé)	Jamie Houston	Camp Rock 2: The Final Jam (soundtrack)	2010
"When You Look Me in the Eyes"	Jonas Brothers, Kevin Jonas Sr., PJ Bianco, Raymond Boyd	Jonas Brothers	2006
"Who's in Your Head"	Jonas Brothers	Non-album release	2021
"Wings"	Jonas Brothers, Jon Bellion, Jordan K. Johnson, Stefan Johnson, Peter Nappi, Jason Cornet, Clyde Lawrence, Jordan Cohen	The Album	2023
"World War III"	Nick Jonas	Lines, Vines and Trying Times	2009
"Wouldn't Change A Thing" (Demi Lovato ft. Joe Jonas)	Adam Anders, Nikki Hassman, Peer Astrom	Camp Rock 2: The Final Jam (soundtrack)	2010
X
"X"	Nick Jonas, Carolina Giraldo, Ryan Tedder, Shellback, Ali Tamposi	Non-album release	2020
Y
"Year 3000"	James Bourne	It's About Time and Jonas Brothers	2006
"Yo Ho (A Pirate's Life for Me)"	George Bruns, Xavier Atencio	DisneyMania 4	2006
"You Just Don't Know It"	Jonas Brothers, Desmond Child	It's About Time	2006
"Your Biggest Fan"	Jonas Brothers, PJ Bianco	Jonas L.A.	2010
"You're My Favourite Song" (Demi Lovato ft. Joe Jonas)	Jeannie Lurie, Chen Neeman, Aris Achontis	Camp Rock 2: The Final Jam (soundtrack)	2010
Z

== Jonas songs ==
Songs featured in the Disney Channel original series, Jonas.

Song title	Episode title	Season, Episode	Airdate
"Chillin' in the Summer Time"	"Boat Trip"	Season 2, Episode 11	August 8, 2010
"Critical"	"The Flirt Locker"	Season 2, Episode 10	August 29, 2010
"Drive"	"Direct to Video"	Season 2, Episode 9	August 22, 2010
"Fall"	"Back to the Beach"	Season 2, Episode 2	June 27, 2010
"Feelin' Alive"	"Band Of Brothers"	Season 2, Episode 13	October 3, 2010
"Give Love a Try"	"Wrong Song"	Season 1, Episode 1	May 2, 2009
"Give Love a Try" (Joe Jonas version)	"Karaoke Surprise"	Season 1, Episode 14	September 27, 2009
"Hey You"	"America's Sweethearts"	Season 2, Episode 5	July 25, 2010
"Scandinavia"	"Cold Shoulder"	Season 1, Episode 18	December 6, 2009
"Invisible"	"And... Action"	Season 2, Episode 4	July 11, 2010
"Keep It Real"	"Keeping it Real"	Season 1, Episode 4	May 17, 2009
"L.A. Baby"	"House Party"	Season 2, Episode 1	June 20, 2010
"Love Sick"	"Love Sick"	Season 1, Episode 10	August 2, 2009
"Make It Right"	"Date Expectations"	Season 2, Episode 3	July 2, 2010
"Pizza Girl"	"Slice of Life"	Season 1, Episode 3	May 16, 2009
"Set This Party Off"	"House Party"	Season 2, Episode 1	June 20, 2010
"Summer Rain"	"On The Radio"	Season 2, Episode 12	September 26, 2010
"Things Will Never Be the Same"	"Up in the Air"	Season 2, Episode 8	August 15, 2010
"Time Is on Our Side"	"Forgetting Stella's Birthday"	Season 1, Episode 16	September 27, 2009
"We Got to Work It Out"	"Band's Best Friend"	Season 1, Episode 5	June 7, 2009
"Tell Me Why"	"Fashion Victim"	Season 1, Episode 7	June 21, 2009
"Your Biggest Fan"	"The Secret"	Season 2, Episode 6	August 1, 2010
