= Camp Rock 3 (soundtrack) =

Soundtrack album by Camp Rock 3 cast
- Released: August 13, 2026
- Genre: Pop
- Length: 48:56
- Label: Walt Disney

Camp Rock soundtracks chronology
Camp Rock 2: The Final Jam (2010)	Camp Rock 3 (2026)

Singles from Camp Rock 3
- 1. "One Beat Away" Released: July 1, 2026; 2. "Play My Music" Released: August 7, 2026; 3. "Tomorrow" Released: August 21, 2026

Camp Rock 3 is a soundtrack album by the cast of the film of the same name, releasing on August 13, 2026, by Walt Disney Records. The soundtrack was announced on July 1, 2026, with the release of the lead single, "One Beat Away" performed by Liamani.

== Background ==
The soundtrack was released on August 13, 2026, to accompany the release of its parent film. The soundtrack consists of 17 songs, including new versions of "We Rock", "Play My Music", "Start the Party", and "What It Takes" from Camp Rock, as well as "Brand New Day", and "It's On" from Camp Rock 2: The Final Jam.

== Track listing ==
Camp Rock 3 (Original Soundtrack) track listing
No.	Title	Writer(s)	Performer(s)	Length
1.	"Come On Over"	Antonina Armato; Tim James Price; Adam Schmalholz; Thomas Armato Sturges	Jonas Brothers (as Connect 3)	3:05
2.	"One Beat Away"	Matthew Tishler; Shridhar Solanki	Liamani; Cast of Camp Rock 3	2:49
3.	"Tomorrow"	Josh Cumbee; Jordan Powers	Malachi Barton	3:08
4.	"Play It My Way"	Aaron C. Harmon	Lumi Pollack	3:18
5.	"Get Ready"	William "Will Jay" Behlendorf; Jason Mater; Brandon C. Rogers	Hudson Stone	2:32
6.	"My Own Drum"	Jaheem King Toombs	Casey Trotter	2:52
7.	"Echo"	Alex Geringas; Polly Josephine Geringas; Alexandra Grace Saad	Liamani; Barton; Pollack; Stone; Trotter	2:21
8.	"Rhythm's Only Right"	Tishler; Grayson DeWolfe	Liamani; Stone	3:04
9.	"Work In Progress"	Armato; James Price; Armato Sturges	Cast of Camp Rock 3	3:18
10.	"Play My Music"	Kara DioGuardi; Mitch Allan	Cast of Camp Rock 3	2:17
11.	"Start The Party"	Matthew Gerrard; Robbie Nevil	Cast of Camp Rock 3	3:01
12.	"We Rock"	DioGuardi; Greg Wells	Cast of Camp Rock 3	2:44
13.	"Tomorrow (Acoustic)"	Cumbee; Powers	Barton	1:17
14.	"What It Takes"	Armato; James Price	Brooklynn Pitts	2:30
15.	"Brand New Day"	DioGuardi; Allan	Liamani	3:21
16.	"It's On"	Toby Gad; Lyrica Anderson; Kovasciar Myvette	Pollack; Stone; Ava Jean	2:18
17.	"Score Suite"	Tom Howe	Tom Howe	5:01
Total length:				48:56

== Charts ==
Chart performance for Camp Rock 3
Chart (2026)	Peak position
Portuguese Streaming Albums (AFP)	194
UK Album Downloads (Official Charts)	34
US Kid Albums (Billboard)	4
US Soundtrack Albums (Billboard)	9
