= Alyson Stoner =

American actor, singer, and dancer (born 1993)

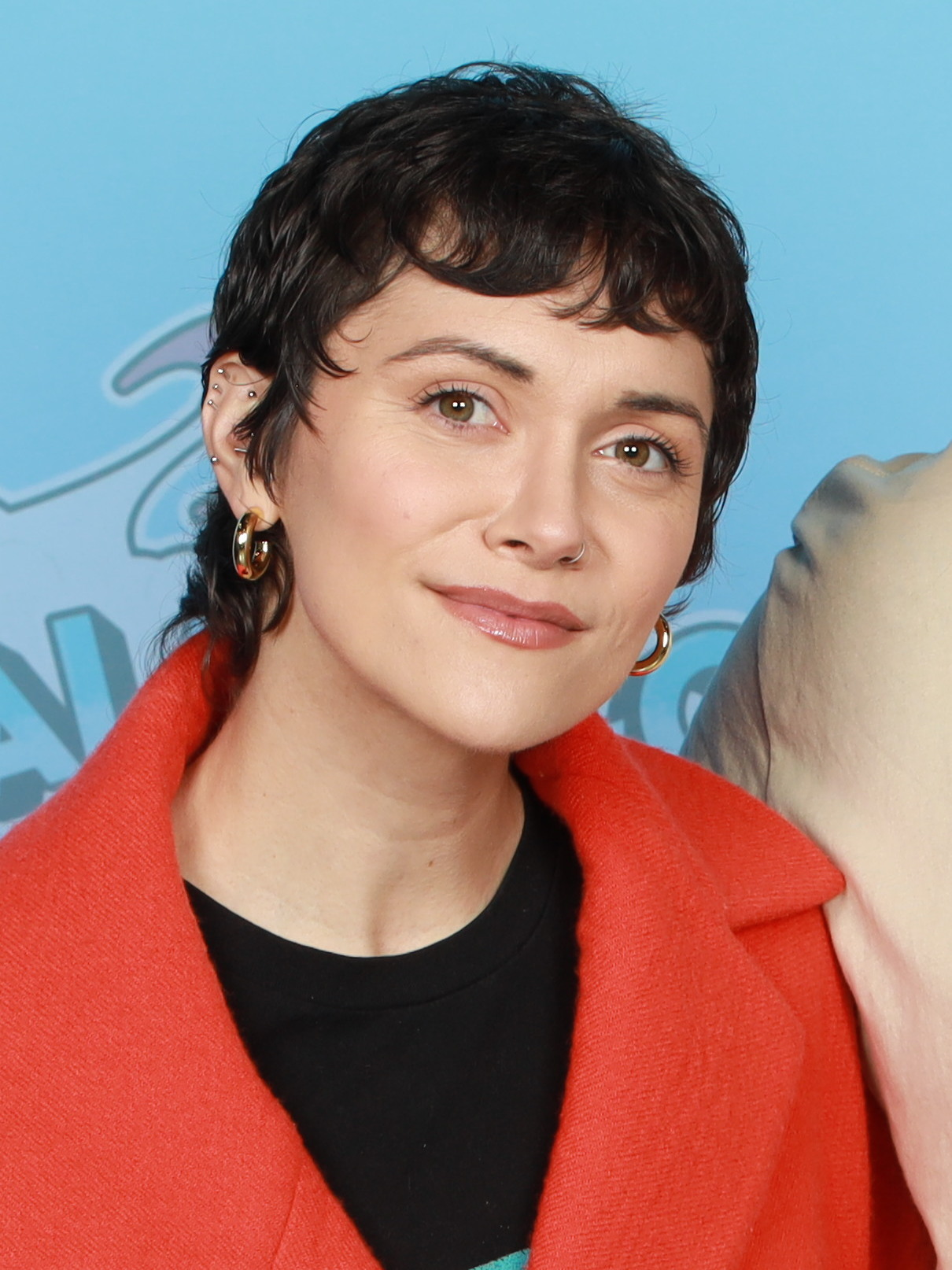
- Stoner at GalaxyCon Columbus in 2025
- Born: Alyson Rae Stoner; August 11, 1993 (age 33); Toledo, Ohio, U.S.
- Occupations: Actor; singer; dancer
- Years active: 2000–present
- Musical career
- Genres: Pop; R&B
- Instrument: Vocals

Alyson Rae Stoner (born August 11, 1993) is an American actor, singer, and dancer. Their (Note: Stoner uses they/them pronouns.) film roles include the Cheaper by the Dozen films (2003–2005) and the Step Up franchise (2006–2014). On television, they have hosted Disney Channel's Mike's Super Short Show (2002–2007), played Max in The Suite Life of Zack & Cody (2005–2007), voiced Isabella Garcia-Shapiro in Phineas and Ferb (2007–2015; 2025–present), and portrayed Caitlyn in Camp Rock (2008) and Camp Rock 2: The Final Jam (2010).

Stoner has performed as a background dancer for artists including Missy Elliott, Eminem, Kumbia Kings, Outkast, and Will Smith. As a voice actor, they provided the voices of Kairi and Xion in the Kingdom Hearts video game series (2008–2020) and voiced Holly Hobbie in the Holly Hobbie & Friends animated specials (2006–2008). They have also released twelve singles and two extended plays.

== Early life ==
Stoner was born in Toledo, Ohio, the child of LuAnne Hodges (née Adams), a former executive secretary at Owens-Illinois, and Charlie Stoner. While growing up in Toledo, Stoner attended Maumee Valley Country Day School and studied ballet, tap dance, and jazz dance at the O'Connell's Dance Studio. They also modeled and trained at the Margaret O'Brien Modeling Studio. They won Best Model of the Year at the International Modeling and Talent Association Convention in New York City under O'Brien's studio in 2000.

== Career ==
=== Acting ===
In 2002, Stoner became the co-host of the Disney Channel Mike's Super Short Show along with Michael Alan Johnson, an infomercial segment regarding forthcoming Disney releases. In 2003 and 2005, they appeared as Sarah, one of the twelve Baker children, in the successful comedies Cheaper by the Dozen and Cheaper by the Dozen 2. They have also appeared in several television shows aimed at the preteen audience, including The Suite Life of Zack & Cody, That's So Raven and Drake & Josh.

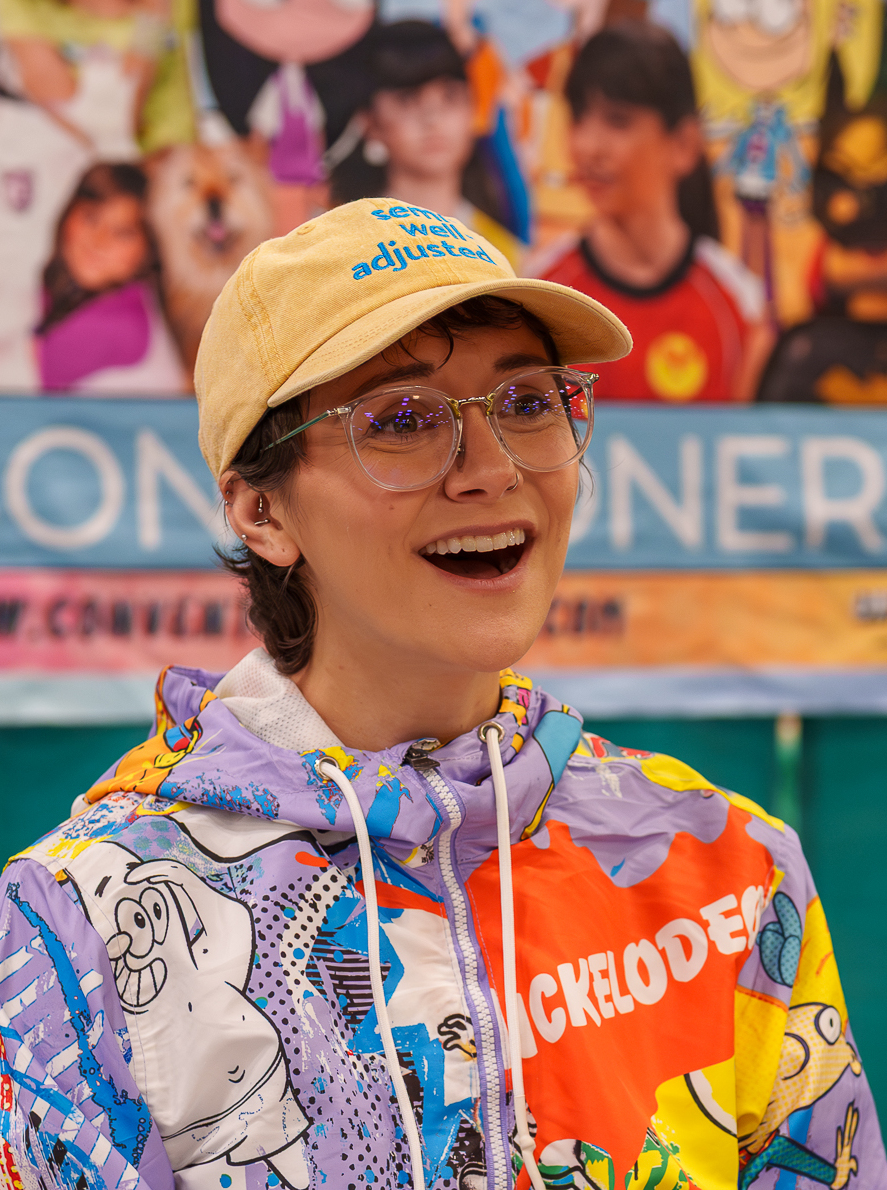
Alyson Stoner, December 6, 2025 Galaxy Con Columbus talking to fans

In 2006, they had a small film role in Step Up as Camille, Channing Tatum's character's younger foster sister. They provided the voice of Isabella Garcia-Shapiro and Jenny (until Season 4) in the Disney Channel animated series Phineas and Ferb from 2007 to 2015. In 2008, they starred in the Disney Channel Original film Camp Rock as Caitlyn Gellar, an aspiring music producer. Their reception in Camp Rock was particularly strong, with various media outlets suggesting it was about time they played a main character role having backed up for other big names such as Will Smith and Eminem. Stoner starred as Alice McKinley in the film Alice Upside Down, based loosely on the Alice series, particularly The Agony of Alice by Phyllis Reynolds Naylor. This was their second starring role and, according to an interview that appears on the direct-to-DVD release, they stated that this was the first time they had to appear in every scene in a film.

In 2010, Stoner appeared in the third Step Up film Step Up 3D opposite Adam Sevani where they reprised the role. Stoner uploaded a video onto their official YouTube page of their final dance rehearsal which introduced other cast members. The same year, Stoner returned to reprise their role as Caitlyn Gellar in Camp Rock 2: The Final Jam, a sequel to Camp Rock. Stoner also guest-starred in the television drama series House as a skater.

They also appeared in Wii Fit related videos on the Nintendo Channel on the Wii video game console demonstrating balance exercises. Stoner replaced Hayden Panettiere as the voice of Kairi in Kingdom Hearts Re:Chain of Memories, Xion in Kingdom Hearts 358/2 Days, and both characters in Kingdom Hearts III. They voiced the character Opal in seasons three and four of The Legend of Korra.

=== Singing ===
In 2008, they sang two songs, "Lost and Found" and "Free Spirit", from the soundtrack of Alice Upside Down, in which they played the lead role. They have also recorded a cover version of the song Dancing in the Moonlight for the 2009 Space Buddies.

On April 4, 2010, Stoner posted a video to their YouTube channel announcing the release of their debut single "Flying Forward" on April 20, 2010. Stoner released their debut EP entitled Beat the System in 2011. Also in 2011, Stoner started working with record producers, songwriters and a vocal coach to change their vocal style from "kiddie-pop" to a more soulful pop vibe with a little alternative edge for their first studio album.

=== Dancing ===
After choreography training in Los Angeles, Stoner appeared as a backup dancer in several music videos, notably Missy Elliott's "Work It", "Gossip Folks", "I'm Really Hot", Eminem's "Just Lose It", and "No Tengo Dinero" by the Kumbia Kings. Stoner was also a backup dancer for Outkast at the 2004 Kids' Choice Awards and for Will Smith at the 2005 show. Stoner danced with a dancing group called The JammX Kids between 2003 and 2006. They quit the group in early 2006 due to scheduling conflicts, but continued to work with the individual kids on different jobs. They were also one of the dancers in the special features for the Shark Tale DVD.

Stoner teaches hip hop classes at the Millennium Dance Complex, and is credited as the youngest person to teach a master class there. They also appeared in Debby Ryan's "We Got the Beat" for Disney Channel's Radio Rebel. In February 2015, they released a dance tribute video to Missy Elliott featuring a mash up medley of Missy Elliott videos they had danced in when they were younger. Within the first week, it received more than 12 million views. Missy Elliott invited Alyson to perform "Work It" with her at the 2019 MTV Video Music Awards.

=== Publishing ===
Stoner was the "dance editor" for KEWL Magazine. In February 2009, Stoner released the Alyson Stoner Project described as "a dance video hybrid — melding many styles of entertainment into one package". It was directed by Kevin Schmidt, their co-star from Cheaper by the Dozen.

In 2025, Stoner announced the release of their memoir, Semi-Well-Adjusted Despite Literally Everything, focusing on child stardom, family violence and religious trauma. The book debuted at number six on the Publishers Weekly Bestseller List selling 5,579 units in its first week.

== Personal life ==
In March 2018, Stoner came out in an article for Teen Vogue, stating that they were "attracted to men, women, and people who identify in other ways." Later that year, they stated in an interview that they did not feel comfortable labeling their sexual orientation or faith at the time. In June 2023, Stoner came out as non-binary. They use they/them pronouns. Stoner has stated that they were fired from a television show after coming out as pansexual and queer.

Stoner has spoken openly about their struggles with mental health and eating disorders. They have said that they first experienced anxiety at age six due to the pressures of working in the entertainment industry, with symptoms including heart palpitations, hair loss, and seizures. In 2011, at age 17, Stoner was hospitalized and checked themself into a rehab facility for eating disorders, after several years of struggling with anorexia, bulimia, and binge eating. They credit therapy with assisting in their recovery.

== Filmography ==
=== Film ===
Year	Title	Role	Notes
2003	Cheaper by the Dozen	Sarah Baker	
2004	Garfield: The Movie	Rat Kids	Voice role
2005	Cheaper by the Dozen 2	Sarah Baker	
2006	Step Up	Camille	
2006	Holly Hobbie & Friends: Surprise Party	Holly Hobbie	Voice role
2006	Holly Hobbie & Friends: Christmas Wishes	Holly Hobbie	Voice role
2007	Holly Hobbie & Friends: Secret Adventures	Holly Hobbie	Voice role
2007	Holly Hobbie & Friends: Best Friends Forever	Holly Hobbie	Voice role
2007	Alice Upside Down	Alice McKinley	
2009	The Alyson Stoner Project	Self	Direct-to-video film
2010	Kung-Fu Magoo	Lorelei Tan Gu	Voice role
2010	Step Up 3D	Camille	
2011	The Little Engine That Could	The Little Engine	Voice role
2013	Super Buddies	Strawberry	Voice role
2014	Step Up: All In	Camille	
2015	Hoovey	Jen Elliott	
2015	The A-List	Lacey Parish	
2015	Summer Forever	Liv	
2015	Huevos: Little Rooster's Egg-cellent Adventure	Sweet Pea	Voice role (English dub)
2016	Apartment 407	Kate	originally titled Selling Isobel
2018	To the Beat!	Alyson Stoner	
2018	Mr. Invincible	Talullah	
2018	Lego DC Comics Super Heroes: Aquaman – Rage of Atlantis	Barbara Gordon / Batgirl	Direct-to-video film; voice role
2019	Lego DC Batman: Family Matters	Barbara Gordon / Batgirl	Direct-to-video film; voice role
2020	Phineas and Ferb the Movie: Candace Against the Universe	Isabella Garcia-Shapiro	Voice role
2024	Child Star	Self	Documentary
2028	Untitled third Phineas and Ferb movie	Isabella Garcia-Shapiro	Voice role

=== Television ===
Year	Title	Role	Notes
2002–2007	Mike's Super Short Show	Sally	Main role
2004	I'm with Her	Dylan Cassidy	Episode: "The Kid Stays in the Picture"
2004	Drake & Josh	Wendy	Episode: "Number One Fan"
2004–2006	Lilo & Stitch: The Series	Victoria	Recurring voice role
2005	That's So Raven	Allison "Ally" Parker	Episode: "Goin' Hollywood"
2005–2007	The Suite Life of Zack & Cody	Max	Recurring role
2006	Joey	Kaley	Episode: "Joey and the Critic"
2006	All Grown Up!	Lisa	Voice role; episode: "Rachel, Rachel"
2006	W.I.T.C.H.	Lillian Hale	Recurring voice role
2007	Disney's Really Short Report	Self	Episode: "Bridge to Terabithia"
2007–2015, 2025–present	Phineas and Ferb	Isabella Garcia-Shapiro, Jenny Brown, additional voices	Main voice role
2008	Camp Rock	Caitlyn	Television film
2008	Jonas Brothers: Living the Dream	Self	Episode: "Hello Hollywood"
2008	Disney Channel Games	Self/Contestant	5 episodes, part of Blue Team
2010	Camp Rock 2: The Final Jam	Caitlyn	Television film
2010	House	Della	Episode: "Selfish"
2011	Phineas and Ferb the Movie: Across the 2nd Dimension	Isabella Garcia-Shapiro, Isabella-2	Voice role; television film
2011–2013, 2019–2022	Young Justice	Barbara Gordon / Batgirl / Oracle, Bette Kane	Recurring voice role (as Barbara Gordon), 14 episodes; episode: "Homefront" (as Bette Kane)
2014	The Legend of Korra	Opal, Female Bandit	Recurring voice role
2014	Major Crimes	Bug	Episode: "Jane Doe #38"
2014	Expecting Amish	Mary	Television film
2015	Sugar Babies	Katie Woods	Television film
2016	Hitting the Breaks	Gretchen McBride	Episode: "Home Alone on the Range"
2016–2019	Milo Murphy's Law	Lydia, Kris, Isabella Garcia-Shapiro	Recurring voice role
2017	Voltron: Legendary Defender	Florona	Voice role; episode: "The Depths"
2017–2022	Pete the Cat	Callie Cat	Main voice role
2019–present	The Loud House	Sam Sharp, additional voices	Voice role; 11 episodes
2022–2025	Hamster & Gretel	Lauren / The Destructress, additional voices	Recurring voice role

=== Music videos ===
Year	Title	Artist(s)	Role	Ref.
2002	"Work It"	Missy Elliott	Dancer	
2003	"Gossip Folks"	Missy Elliott	Dancer	
2003	"Pass That Dutch"	Missy Elliott	Dancer	
2004	"I'm Really Hot"	Missy Elliott	Dancer	
2004	"Just Lose It"	Eminem	Dancer	
2004	“No Tengo Dinero”	AB Quintanilla y Kumbia Kings	Dancer	

=== Web ===
Year	Title	Role	Notes
2008–2009	Ghost Town	Tina Burton	7 episodes
2016	Roommates	Alyson	Episode: "Five Guys and Five Girls"
2023–present	Dear Hollywood	Themself	Host

=== Video games ===
Year	Title	Voice role	Notes
2008	Kingdom Hearts Re:Chain of Memories	Kairi	
2009	Kingdom Hearts 358/2 Days	Xion, Kairi	
2011	Phineas and Ferb: Across the 2nd Dimension	Isabella Garcia-Shapiro, Isabella-2, Receptionist	
2013	Phineas and Ferb: Quest for Cool Stuff	Isabella Garcia-Shapiro	
2013	Kingdom Hearts HD 1.5 Remix	Xion, Kairi	
2017	Kingdom Hearts HD 2.8 Final Chapter Prologue	Kairi	
2019	Kingdom Hearts III	Kairi, Xion	
2020	Kingdom Hearts: Melody of Memory	Kairi	

== Discography ==
=== Extended plays ===
List of albums
Title	Album details
Beat the System	Released: August 23, 2011; Format: Digital download; Label: Independent
While You Were Sleeping	Released: October 28, 2016; Format: Digital download; Label: Turn The Volume Up

=== Singles ===
Year	Title	Album
2010	"Flying Forward"	N/A
2010	"Make History"	N/A
2013	"Dragon (That's What You Wanted)"	N/A
2015	"Pretty Girls"	N/A
2016	"Woman"	N/A
2016	"Back to Church"	N/A
2016	"The Boy is Mine"	N/A
2018	"Someone to Call My Lover"	N/A
2018	"When It's Right"	N/A
2018	"Who Do You Love"	N/A
2018	"Fool"	N/A
2019	"Stripped Bare"	TBA

=== Featured singles ===
List of singles, with selected chart positions
Year	Title	Peak chart positions			Album
Year	Title	US	CAN	UK	Album
2008	"We Rock" (among Cast of Camp Rock)	33	70	97	Camp Rock
2010	"It's On" (among Cast of Camp Rock 2: The Final Jam)	—	—	—	Camp Rock 2: The Final Jam
2014	"Without You" (Tyler Ward featuring Alyson Stoner)	—	—	—	N/A
2015	"Give Me Strength" (Brock Baker featuring Alyson Stoner)	—	—	—	N/A
"—" denotes releases that did not chart or was not released in that territory.

=== Other appearances ===
Year	Title	Other artist(s)	Album
2008	"Lost & Found"	N/A	Alice Upside Down
2008	"Free Spirit"	Bridgit Mendler	Alice Upside Down
2009	"Dancin' in the Moonlight"	N/A	Space Buddies
2009	"Fly Away Home"	N/A	Tinker Bell and the Lost Treasure
2010	"What I've Been Looking For"	N/A	DisneyMania 7
2010	"Can't Back Down"	Demi Lovato and Anna Maria Perez de Tagle	Camp Rock 2: The Final Jam
2010	"What We Came Here For"	Cast of Camp Rock 2: The Final Jam	Camp Rock 2: The Final Jam
2010	"This Is Our Song"	Demi Lovato, Joe & Nick Jonas	Camp Rock 2: The Final Jam
2017	"Evolution of Michael Jackson"	Next Town Down	N/A

== Awards and nominations ==
Year	Title	Category	Nominated	Result	Refs
2004	Young Artist Awards	Best Performance in a Feature Film: Young Actress age 10 or younger	Cheaper by the Dozen	Nominated	
2004	Young Artist Awards	Best Young Ensemble in a Feature Film	Cheaper by the Dozen	Won	
2006	Young Artist Awards	Best Performance in a Feature Film: Young Ensemble Cast	Cheaper by the Dozen 2	Nominated	
2007	Young Artist Awards	Best Performance in a Feature Film: Supporting Young Actress	Step Up	Nominated	
2007	Young Artist Awards	Best Performance in a TV Series (Comedy or Drama): Guest Starring Young Actress	The Suite Life of Zack & Cody	Nominated	
2008	Young Artist Awards	Best Performance in a TV Series: Recurring Young Actress	The Suite Life of Zack & Cody	Nominated	
2017	Streamy Awards	Best Dance Performance	Self	Won	
2018	BTVA Awards	Best Female Vocal Performance in a Television Series in a Guest Role	Voltron: Legendary Defender	Nominated	
2018	BTVA Awards	BTVA People's Choice Award for Best Female Vocal Performance in a Television Series in a Guest Role	Voltron: Legendary Defender	Won	
2018	BTVA Awards	Best Vocal Ensemble in a Television Series	Voltron: Legendary Defender	Nominated	
2018	BTVA Awards	BTVA People's Choice Award for Best Vocal Ensemble in a Television Series	Voltron: Legendary Defender	Won	

== Book ==
- Stoner, Alyson (2025). Semi-Well-Adjusted Despite Literally Everything: A Memoir. New York: St. Martin's Press. ISBN 978-1250353498
