= One Beat Away (Camp Rock song) =

Song by Liamani and the cast of Camp Rock 3

from the album Camp Rock 3
- Released: July 1, 2026
- Genre: Pop rock
- Length: 2:49
- Label: Walt Disney
- Songwriters: Matthew Tishler; Shridhar Solanki
- Producers: Matthew Tishler; Mike Wise

Camp Rock singles chronology
"Fire" (2010)	"One Beat Away" (2026)

"One Beat Away" is a song performed by Liamani and the cast of Camp Rock 3 and the first single from Camp Rock 3 (Official Soundtrack) and its parent film.

== Background ==
One Beat Away is the first single for Camp Rock 3, and the first song from the Camp Rock franchise since 2010. A lyric video was released on Disney Music's Vevo channel on July 1, 2026.

== Personnel ==
Personnel adapted from Apple Music and Spotify.

- Liamani – vocals
- Matthew Tishler – producer, songwriter, vocals
- Mike Wise – producer, recording engineer, bass, guitar, synthesizer
- Lumi Pollack – vocals
- Hudson Stone – vocals
- Casey Trotter – vocals
- Ava Jean – vocals
- Ella Lucas – vocals
- Orlando Lucas – vocals
- Jordyn Kane – vocals
- Matthew Harvey – recording engineer
- John Davis – recording engineer
- Vic Florencia – mixing engineer
- Brian Malouf – mastering engineer
