= Wouldn't Change a Thing (Camp Rock song) =

2010 Camp Rock song

Single by Demi Lovato and Joe Jonas

from the album Camp Rock 2: The Final Jam
- Released: July 23, 2010; July 31, 2010 (German version featuring Stanfour)
- Recorded: 2009
- Genre: Pop rock
- Length: 3:23
- Label: Walt Disney
- Songwriters: Adam Anders; Nikki Hassman; Peer Åström
- Producers: Anders; Hassman; Åström

Alternate cover
- German single featuring Stanfour

Demi Lovato singles chronology
| "We'll Be a Dream" (2010) | "Wouldn't Change a Thing" (2010) | "Skyscraper" (2011) |

Joe Jonas singles chronology
| "Gotta Find You" (2008) | "Wouldn't Change a Thing" (2010) | "See No More" (2011) |

Camp Rock singles chronology
| "Fire" (2010) | "Wouldn't Change a Thing" (2010) | "Heart and Soul" (2010) |

"Wouldn't Change a Thing" is a song performed by Demi Lovato with Joe Jonas from the 2010 Disney Channel television film Camp Rock 2: The Final Jam. The song was released on July 23, 2010, as the fourth single from the album. It was written and produced by Adam Anders, Nikki Hassman and Peer Åström. The song has versions and adaptations in nine languages included in different editions of the official soundtrack.

The song entered the top 100 in Canada, Scotland and the United Kingdom, and the German version, performed by Lovato and the band Stanfour, released on July 31, reached the top 40 in Austria and Germany.

The song was featured in the episode "These Arms of Mine" from Grey's Anatomy and was performed by the character Alex Karev, portrayed by actor Justin Chambers. "Wouldn't Change a Thing" was also featured on the 2010 karaoke video game Disney Sing It: Party Hits, where Lovato acted as the in-game vocal coach.

== Reception ==
=== Critical response ===
In 2023, it was chosen by Billboard as one of the 100 Greatest Disney Songs of All Time.

=== Commercial performance ===
The song failed to enter the Billboard Hot 100, but charted on the Bubbling Under Hot 100. It entered the chart for the week ending August 28, 2010 in last place, at 25. Three weeks later, it re-entered and peaked at number 10. On the Official Charts in the UK and Scotland, it entered for one week and peaked at number 71 and 57 respectively. On the Canadian Hot 100 the song peaked at number 90. The Stanfour version charted in Austria and Germany in the top 40 in both countries.

== Music video ==
The music video for "Wouldn't Change a Thing" was taken from the filming of the movie Camp Rock 2: The Final Jam, with the scenes recorded on the film and transformed into a video clip, at the moment when the actors perform the song. Directed by Paul Hoen and produced by Kevin Lafferty and Alan Sacks, the video shows Lovato and Jonas singing the song separately, reminiscing about the moments they were together, ending up meeting at the end and singing together the song, main theme of the film.

== Track listings and formats ==
- International digital download
1. "Wouldn't Change a Thing" (with Joe Jonas) – 3:23
- German CD single
1. "Wouldn't Change a Thing" (featuring Stanfour) – 3:23
2. "Wouldn't Change a Thing" (instrumental) – 3:23
- German digital download
1. "Wouldn't Change a Thing" (featuring Stanfour) – 3:24
- Digital EP
1. "Wouldn't Change a Thing" (featuring Stanfour) – 3:23
2. "Wouldn't Change a Thing" (with Joe Jonas) – 3:23
3. "Wouldn't Change a Thing" (instrumental) – 3:23
4. "Wouldn't Change a Thing" (music video) – 3:23

== Charts ==
Weekly chart performance for "Wouldn't Change a Thing"
| Chart (2010) | Peak position |
|---|---|
| Canada Hot 100 (Billboard) | 90 |
| Scotland Singles (OCC) | 57 |
| UK Singles (OCC) | 71 |
| US Bubbling Under Hot 100 (Billboard) | 10 |

Weekly chart performance for "Wouldn't Change a Thing" (Stanfour version)
| Chart (2010) | Peak position |
|---|---|
| Austria (Ö3 Austria Top 40) | 36 |
| Germany (GfK) | 28 |

== Certifications ==
Certifications and sales for "Wouldn't Change a Thing"
| Region | Certification | Certified units/sales |
|---|---|---|
| United States (RIAA) | Gold | 500,000^{‡} |
^{‡} Sales+streaming figures based on certification alone.

== Other versions ==
- The Brazilian edition of the soundtrack features a version titled "Eu Não Mudaria Nada Em Você", performed by Jullie featuring Joe Jonas.
- The Portuguese edition features a version titled "Nada Vou Mudar", performed by Mia Rose featuring Joe Jonas.
- The Italian edition features a version titled "Per la vita che verrà", performed by Finley.
- The Polish edition features a version titled "Nie zmieniajmy nic", performed by Ewa Farna featuring Jakub Molęda.
- The Hungarian edition features a version titled "És Ezt Érzem Így Van Jól", performed by Brigitta Némethy featuring Ádám Dando.
- The Romanian edition features a version titled "Nu Aș Schimba Nimic", performed by Miruna Oprea featuring Noni Răzvan Ene.
- The Belgian edition features a version performed by Sita featuring Dean.
- The Turkish edition features a version titled "İstemem Değişmesin", performed by Atiye Deniz.
- The Czech edition features a version titled "Stejný cíl mám dál", performed by Ewa Farna featuring Jan Bendig.
- The third season of the Disney+ series High School Musical: The Musical: The Series features a version performed by Saylor Bell, Adrian Lyles, Frankie A. Rodriguez and Joe Serafini.
