= Wouldn't Change a Thing =

Wouldn't Change a Thing may refer to:

- "Wouldn't Change a Thing" (Kylie Minogue song)
- "Wouldn't Change a Thing" (Camp Rock song)
- "Wouldn't Change a Thing", a 2004 song by Haven
- "Wouldn't Change a Thing", a 2011 song by Matthew West
