= Liamani Segura =

American singer and actress (born 2008)

Liamani
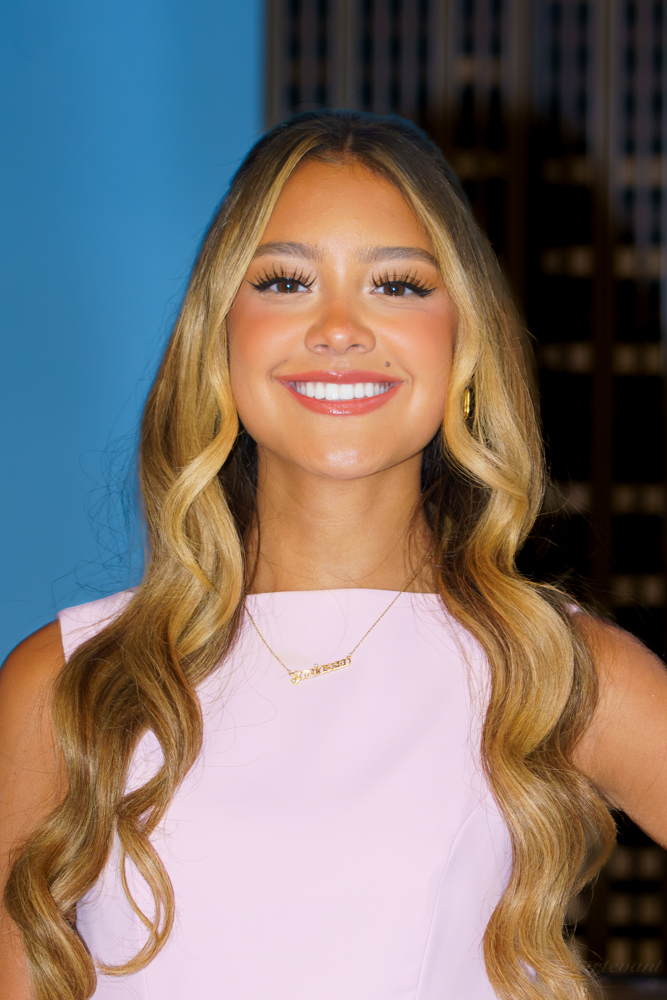
- Liamani in 2026

Background information
- Born: Liamani Segura; October 24, 2008 (age 18); Racine, Wisconsin, U.S.
- Occupations: Singer, actress
- Years active: 2018–present
- Label: Def Jam
- Website: liamaniofficial.com

Liamani Segura (born October 24, 2008) is an American singer and actress. Liamani began her musical career at age 9 when she was cast as Dorothy in the Lees–McRae College Summer Theatre production of The Wiz in North Carolina. As an actress, she made her television debut in High School Musical: The Musical: The Series as Emmy. She played Pink in the Disney channel movie Descendants: Wicked Wonderland (2026) and starred as Sage Scott in Camp Rock 3 (2026).

Self-taught, she began performing in public at age six, she has sung the national anthem at major sporting events, including the Indy 500, Game 1 of Major League Baseball's 2018 National League Division Series between the Milwaukee Brewers and Colorado Rockies at Miller Park, and the 2019 NCAA Women's Final Four Championship Game.

== Early life ==
I remember the words and I just sing my little heart out.

— Liamani Segura, age 9

Liamani Segura was born in Racine, Wisconsin, on October 24, 2008. Her father, Anthony Segura, is a disabled veteran of the United States Army Reserve and her mother, Joanna, is a registered nurse. She has an older sister Anaya Segura and a younger brother Anthony Segura Jr.

Liamani began singing when she was two. "I was self-taught, I did not take voice lessons or participate in organized musical activities as a girl". "I practiced all my vocal inflections by watching music videos on YouTube". She sang the national anthem in public for the first time at a school talent show when she was in kindergarten, and soon branched out to sporting venues. In her second live performance outside her home in February 2015, she sang "The Star-Spangled Banner" before 1,300 attendees at a St. Catherine's High School basketball game. Two months later, she performed the national anthem at a Milwaukee Brewers baseball game; she was invited back to sing at Miller Park in 2016 and again in 2017. In October 2018, she sang the national anthem before Game 1 of the 2018 National League Division Series between the Milwaukee Brewers and Colorado Rockies at Miller Park.

Segura has performed the national anthem before basketball games of St. Catherine's High School, Horlick High School, Park High School, Marquette Golden Eagles, and the Milwaukee Bucks; baseball games of the Milwaukee Brewers; the Indy 500; and the Miss Racine beauty contest. Her voice is described as powerful and loud in contrast to her petite frame.

Segura competed on America's Got Talent, but was eliminated before the televised round.

Liamana Segura auditioned for season 12 of America’s Got Talent in 2017. Three years later, Liamani was selected to compete on season 15 of America’s Got Talent after advancing through initial producer auditions in late 2019. Liamani’s televised appearance was canceled when the COVID-19 pandemic halted production before her scheduled flight to film.

== Career ==
In 2018, the nine-year-old Segura was cast as Dorothy in the Lees–McRae College Summer Theatre production of The Wiz. In 2019, Segura sang the national anthem at the NCAA Women's Final Four Championship game. She later performed seven of Mariah Careys songs at the songwriters hall of fame induction cermemony at Mariah carey's invitation.

In 2020, Segura started her own YouTube channel on which she uploads videos from her live performances as well as sings covers of contemporary songs. She participated in the Deborah Cox Challenge, posting her cover of the ending to Cox's song "Nobody's Supposed to Be Here" on Instagram and earning high praise from Cox herself. During the COVID-19 pandemic, she videotaped the national anthem for a virtual Memorial Day livestream event and sang the national anthem in a fan-less stadium for the Milwaukee Brewers' home opener on July 31. Liamani also audtioned for high school musical originaly auditoning to play a younger version of Olivia Rodrigos character Nini (in a flashback scene for season 2). COVID-19 came and the producers were planning to cut the scene but then the producer remembered her audition and then wrote the role of Emmy just for segura.

In 2022, Segura was cast in season 3 of High School Musical: The Musical: The Series as Emmy in a recurring role. In 2023, Segura was promoted to the main cast for the 4th season of the series.

Her debut single, "Sunkissed," was released in 2024 through Def Jam Recordings and UMG Recordings, Inc.

In 2025, she was announced as part of the cast of two Disney movies: the fifth Descendants film, Descendants: Wicked Wonderland, as Pink, the daughter of the Queen of Hearts and the sister of Red, and Camp Rock 3, as Sage.

Segura made a guest appearance during the Anaheim show for the Descendants/Zombies: Worlds Collide Tour, singing "One Kiss" from Descendants 3.

Segura is now fully part of the cast in the 2026 Worlds Collide Concert Tour.

== Awards and honors ==
In 2018/2019/2020 Segura won The Journal Times for Best Musician of the year.

In 2019 Segura also won the HOPES Centre of Racine Talent Show Award. Segura was second place being recognized for her live vocal performance of Ill Be there.

In 2021 Segura won musician of the year.

In 2024 Segura won the Gracie Awards because of her becoming a Actress in a supporting role.

== Discography ==
All credits adapted from Apple Music and Spotify.

=== As lead artist ===
==== Singles ====
Title	Year	Album
"Sunkissed"/"Beso de Sol"	2024	Dear Little Me
"Hanging by a Thread"	2025	Dear Little Me
"True Love"	2025	Dear Little Me
"Christmas I Won't Forget"	2025	Non-album singles
“One Beat Away” (with the Cast of Camp Rock)	2026	Camp Rock 3
"Things I've Learned (So Far)" - Tour Version	2026	Non-album singles

==== Extended Plays ====
Title	Album details
Dear Little Me	Released: August 15, 2025; Label: Def Jam; Formats: Download, streaming

=== As featured artist ===
Title	Year	Album
"A Little Bit of You" (Aria Brooks and Liamani)	2022	High School Musical: The Musical: The Series: The Soundtrack: Season 3
"Mad - Wicked Wonderland" (Kylie Cantrall, Malia Baker, and Liamani)	2026	Descendants: Wicked Wonderland

== Filmography ==
=== Film ===
Year	Title	Role	Notes
2026	Descendants: Wicked Wonderland	Pink	
2026	Camp Rock 3	Sage	

=== Television ===
Year	Title	Role	Notes
2022–2023	High School Musical: The Musical: The Series	Emmy	Seasons 3 and 4
2026	Descendants/Zombies Worlds Collide: Concert Special	Herself	Special
2026	Locker Diaries: Descendants	Pink	5 episodes
2026	Locker Diaries: Camp Rock	Sage	7 episodes
