= Jasmine Richards =

Canadian actress (born 1990)

- Born: Jasmine Denise Richards; June 28, 1990 (age 36); Scarborough, Ontario, Canada
- Occupations: Actress; singer
- Years active: 2003–2014
- Spouse: Michael Caci (m. 2018)
- Children: 1
- Website: adashofsomethingpretty.blogspot.ca

Jasmine Denise Richards (born June 28, 1990) is a Canadian former actress and singer. She is best known for portraying Margaret "Peggy" Dupree in the Camp Rock series, as well as Margaret Browning-Levesque in the Family Channel sitcom Naturally, Sadie and Judge Tara in Overruled!.

== Life and career ==
Richards was born in Scarborough, Ontario to immigrants from Barbados. She moved to Oakville at 1 year old. She went to Iroquois Ridge High School.

She became interested in acting at age 11 and got an acting job at her first open audition. Richards made her first introduction as a child star, playing Shakira in the television series Timeblazers. She starred as Alice Hope, the lead character in the 2005 independent film Devotion. From 2005 to 2007, Richards then played Margaret Browning-Levesque in the Canadian television series Naturally, Sadie along with Charlotte Arnold. In the U.S., Richards also appeared in many of Disney Channel's Express Yourself segments with her Naturally, Sadie co-stars.

In 2007, Richards made an appearance in the television series Da Kink in My Hair. In 2008, Richards appeared in the ABC Family television film Princess. The same year, Richards also appeared in the Disney Channel Original Movie Camp Rock as Margaret "Peggy" Dupree. In 2010, Richards returned to reprise her role as Peggy in Camp Rock 2: The Final Jam, a sequel to Camp Rock. In the first Camp Rock film, she performed the song "Here I Am". However, her singing voice was recorded by Renee Sandstrom.

== Personal life ==
In September 2018, Richards married Michael Caci. They welcomed their first child, a son, in December 2021.

== Filmography ==
=== Film ===
| Year | Title | Role | Notes |
|---|---|---|---|
| 2005 | Devotion | Alice Hope | |
| 2012 | Picture Day | Tiffany | |

=== Television ===
| Year | Title | Role | Notes |
|---|---|---|---|
| 2003 | Timeblazers | Shakira | 6 episodes |
| 2005–2007 | Naturally, Sadie | Margaret Browning-Levesque | Main cast |
| 2007 | Da Kink in My Hair | Lauren | 1 episode |
| 2008 | Princess | Skater Girl | Television film |
| 2008 | Camp Rock | Margaret "Peggy" Dupree | Television film |
| 2008 | The Latest Buzz | Dancer | Cameo; episode: "The Power Tripping Issue" |
| 2009–2010 | Overruled! | Tara Bohun | Main cast |
| 2010 | Camp Rock 2: The Final Jam | Margaret "Peggy" Dupree | Television film |
| 2011 | The Listener | Jan Miller | Episode: Inner Circle |
| 2011 | King | Dawn | 2 episodes |
| 2011–2012 | Redakai: Conquer the Kairu | Maya | Voice; main role |
| 2013 | Bomb Girls | Reggie | 7 episodes |

== Discography ==
Soundtrack albums:

- 2010: Camp Rock 2: The Final Jam

Songs:

- 2009: "Forgotten (Demo)" from Music Myspace Page
- 2009: "Praise Waiteth for Thee" from Music Myspace Page
- 2009: "Overruled! Theme Song" from Overruled!
- 2009: "All Right Now" from Overruled!
- 2011: "You Have the Power" with Thomas L.
