= Camp Rock 2: The Final Jam (soundtrack) =

Soundtrack album by Camp Rock 2: The Final Jam cast
- Released: August 10, 2010
- Genres: Pop rock; Bubblegum pop
- Length: 49:12
- Label: Walt Disney
- Producers: Alke; Mitch Allan; Adam Anders; Aris Archontis; Antonina Armato; Peer Åström; David Bellochio; Kara DioGuardi; Andy Dodd; Toby Gad; Nikki Hassman; Jamie Houston; Tim James; Jeannie Lurie; Chen Neeman; Dapo Torimiro; Twin; Adam Watts; Stacy Wilde

Camp Rock soundtrack chronology
Camp Rock (2008)	Camp Rock 2: The Final Jam (2010)	Camp Rock 3 (2026)

Singles from Camp Rock 2: The Final Jam
- 1. "Wouldn't Change a Thing" Released: July 23, 2010

Camp Rock 2: The Final Jam is the soundtrack album from the 2010 Disney Channel television film of the same name. The album was released on August 10, 2010, by Walt Disney Records. The album debuted at number three on Billboard 200 albums chart with over 41,000 copies sold in the first week.

== Singles ==
- "Wouldn't Change a Thing" by Demi Lovato and Joe Jonas was released on July 23, 2010, as the lead single from the album. The song was written and produced by Adam Anders, Nikki Hassman and Peer Åström.

=== Promotional singles ===
- "Can't Back Down" by Demi Lovato, Alyson Stoner and Anna Maria Perez de Tagle was released on May 10, 2010, as the first promotional single from the album. The song was written by Antonina Armato, Tim James and Tom Sturges and produced by Armato and James.
- "It's On" by the cast of Camp Rock 2: The Final Jam was released on May 18, 2010, as the second promotional single. The song was written by Lyrica Anderson, Kovasciar Myvette and Toby Gad and produced by Gad. A music video for the song premiered on Disney Channel on May 10. It would also be used prominently for the channel's Summer campaign that year. A second music video premiered on May 24, featuring the titular characters from Phineas and Ferb creating a Flash mob on Santa Monica Pier. The song would later be used by ABC to promote their Sunday Fun & Games (consisting of Celebrity Family Feud, The 100,000 Pyramid, and Match Game) 6 years later.
- "Fire" by Matthew "Mdot" Finley was released on June 24, 2010, as the third promotional single. The song was written by Anderson and Dapo Torimiro (who also served as the song's producer).

== Critical reception ==
Professional ratings
Review scores
Source	Rating
AllMusic	2/5 stars

Stephen Thomas Erlewine of AllMusic gave a review: "Camp Rock 2 finds the Jonas Brothers and Demi Lovato joined by R&B singer Matthew 'Mdot' Finley, who gives this collection of Disney bubblegum a slightly different flavor".

== Commercial performance ==
The album debuted at number 3 on the Billboard 200 chart.

== Track listing ==
No.	Title	Writer(s)	Performer(s)	Length
1.	"Brand New Day"	Kara DioGuardi; Mitch Allan	Demi Lovato	3:22
2.	"Fire"	Dapo Torimiro; Lyrica Anderson	Matthew "Mdot" Finley	3:04
3.	"Can't Back Down"	Antonina Armato; Tim James; Thomas Sturges	Demi Lovato, Alyson Stoner and Anna Maria Perez de Taglé	3:21
4.	"It's On"	Anderson; Kovasciar Myvette; Toby Gad	Demi Lovato, Matthew "Mdot" Finley, Meaghan Martin, Jordan Francis, Roshon Fegan and Alyson Stoner	4:03
5.	"Wouldn't Change a Thing"	Adam Anders; Nikki Hassman; Peer Åström	Demi Lovato and Joe Jonas	3:24
6.	"Heart and Soul"	Armato; James; Steve Rushton; Aaron Dudley	Jonas Brothers	2:58
7.	"You're My Favorite Song"	Jeannie Lurie; Chen Neeman; Aris Archontis	Demi Lovato and Joe Jonas	2:16
8.	"Introducing Me"	Jamie Houston	Nick Jonas	3:08
9.	"Tear It Down"	Anderson; Myvette; Gad	Matthew "Mdot" Finley and Meaghan Martin	3:30
10.	"What We Came Here For"	Houston	Demi Lovato, Joe Jonas, Nick Jonas, Alyson Stoner and Anna Maria Perez de Taglé	4:17
11.	"This Is Our Song"	Adam Watts; Andy Dodd	Demi Lovato, Joe Jonas, Nick Jonas and Alyson Stoner	2:59
12.	"Different Summers" (bonus track)	Houston	Demi Lovato	3:37
13.	"Walkin' in My Shoes" (bonus track)	Anderson; Niclas Molinder; Joacim Persson; Johan Alkenäs; Pam Sheyne	Matthew "Mdot" Finley and Meaghan Martin	2:51
14.	"It's Not Too Late" (bonus track)	Watts; Dodd	Demi Lovato	3:34
15.	"Rock Hard or Go Home"	Stacy Wilde; David Bellochio	Iron Weasel (Note: The song "Rock Hard or Go Home" by Iron Weasel originally appeared in the series I'm in the Band episode "What Happened?".)	2:59
Total length:				49:12

Notes

- International iTunes Store editions include the Almighty remix of "It's On", and a special edition including the aforementioned and the music video for "It's On".

== Personnel ==
- Alke – producer and mixing (13)
- Adam Anders – producer (5)
- Aris Archontis – producer and mixing (7)
- Antonina Armato – producer (3, 6)
- Peer Åström – producer and mixing (5)
- David Bellochio – producer and mixing (15)
- Kara DioGuardi – producer (1)
- Andy Dodd – producer and mixing (11, 14)
- Toby Gad – producer and mixing (4, 9)
- Steve Gerdes – creative direction
- Nikki Hassman – producer (5)
- Jamie Houston – producer (8, 10, 12), mixing (8, 12)
- Tim James – producer and mixing (3, 6)
- Jeannie Lurie – producer (7)
- Brian Malouf – mixing (1)
- Stephen Marcussen – mastering
- Chen Neeman – producer (7)
- Joel Soyffer – mixing (10)
- Steve Sterling – album design
- Steven Vincent – music executive for Disney Channel
- Dapo Torimiro – producer and mixing (2)
- Twin – producers and mixing (13)
- Adam Watts – producer and mixing (11, 14)
- Stacy Wilde – producer (15)

== Charts ==
=== Weekly charts ===
Chart performance for Camp Rock 2: The Final Jam
Chart (2010)	Peak position
Austrian Albums (Ö3 Austria)	18
Belgian Albums (Ultratop 50 Flanders)	10
Belgian Albums (Ultratop 50 Wallonia)	30
Brazilian Albums (Pro-Música Brasil)	6
Canadian Albums Chart (Billboard)	4
Danish Albums (Hitlisten)	31
French Albums (SNEP)	39
Italian Compilations Chart (FIMI)	2
German Albums (Offizielle Top 100)	28
Japanese Albums (Oricon)	92
Mexican Albums (Top 100 Mexico)	18
New Zealand Albums (RMNZ)	22
Norwegian Albums (VG-lista)	28
Polish Albums Chart (ZPAV)	3
Portuguese Albums (AFP)	5
Spanish Albums (PROMUSICAE)	4
Swiss Albums (Swiss Hitparade)	45
UK Album Downloads (Official Charts)	25
UK Compilation Albums Chart (OCC)	7
UK Soundtrack Albums Chart (OCC)	1
US Billboard 200	3
US Top Soundtracks (Billboard)	1

=== Year-end charts ===
2010 year-end chart performance for Camp Rock 2: The Final Jam
Chart (2010)	Position
US Billboard 200	169
US Top Soundtracks (Billboard)	14
US Kid Albums (Billboard)	3

== Certifications and sales ==
Certifications and sales for Camp Rock 2: The Final Jam
Region	Certification	Certified units/sales
Brazil (Pro-Música Brasil)	Gold	20,000^{*}
Portugal (AFP)	Platinum	20,000^{^}
United Kingdom (BPI)	Silver	60,000^{‡}
^{*} Sales figures based on certification alone.^{^} Shipments figures based on certification alone.^{‡} Sales+streaming figures based on certification alone.
