= Timeblazers =

Canadian television series (2003–2005)

- Genre: Live-action
- Country of origin: Canada
- No. of seasons: 3
- No. of episodes: 40

Production
- Running time: 25 minutes
- Production companies: CCI Entertainment; Coneybeare Stories

Original release
- Network: YTV
- Release: July 5, 2003 – July 9, 2005

Timeblazers is a Canadian television series that aired on YTV from July 5, 2003 to July 9, 2005 with a total of 40 episodes in 3 seasons.

== Synopsis ==
It features Sam and Jen, two young people who illustrate the origin of present-day customs and technologies as well as discuss notable people through some methods of time travel. Sam and Jen generally do this after a preteen asks a question regarding the origins of something. They travel into the past to explain the happenings and wonders of the old times.

Originally, Shakira, who was portrayed by Jasmine Richards was the preteen who generally originated the questions; however, in later episodes, another preteen named Alex replaced her. Alex was portrayed by Stephen Joffe.

== Cast ==
- Mike Ackerman – Sam
- Heidi Leigh – Jen
- Jasmine Richards – Shakira (season 1)
- Stephen Joffe – Alex (seasons 2 and 3)

== Episodes ==
=== Season 1 ===
- The Keys to the Kingdom
- Planes, Trains & Stagecoaches
- The Great Stink
- The Mother of All Inventions
- The Emperor's Old Clothes
- The Good, the Bad and the Bread
- A Feast Fit for a King
- Get Ready to Rumble!
- Leech a Cold, Bleed a Fever
- Gold!
- Off with His Head!
- Message in a Bottle
- Rumbling and |Romance

=== Season 2 ===
- Kid Jobs
- Home on the Range
- Lost in the Stars
- Schools
- Hot Chocolate
- Romans

=== Season 3 ===
- Dangerous Women
- The Flat Earth Society
- Fun and Games
- History's Biggest Mistakes
- Bikes
- Can You Dig It?
- Flight
- Dark Ages
- A Short History of Time
- A Soldier's Life
- Explorers
- Tyrants
- Who Discovered America?

== U.S. broadcast ==
In the United States of America, this series began airing on Discovery Kids in October 2004. This series also aired briefly in reruns on The Hub until June 24, 2011. It also aired on Qubo from February 18, 2012 until December 30, 2017.
