= Maria Canals-Barrera =

American actress (born 1966)

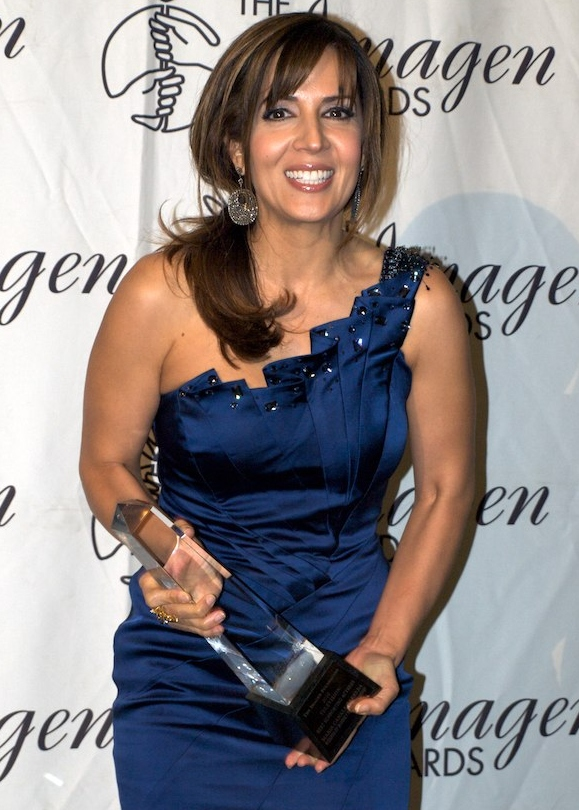
- Canals-Barrera at the 2010 Imagen Awards
- Born: Maria Pilar Canals; September 28, 1966 (age 60); Miami, Florida, U.S.
- Education: University of Miami
- Occupation: Actress
- Years active: 1990–present
- Spouse: David Barrera (m. 1999)
- Children: 2

Maria Pilar Canals-Barrera (née Canals; born September 28, 1966) is an American actress. She is known for starring as Theresa Russo in the Disney Channel series Wizards of Waverly Place (2007–2012) and recurring in Wizards Beyond Waverly Place (2025-2026), Connie Torres in Camp Rock (2008), Camp Rock 2: The Final Jam (2010), Camp Rock 3 (2026), and Daniela in the ABC comedy series Cristela (2014–2015).

Canals-Barrera has voiced Shayera Hol/Hawkgirl in Justice League, Justice League Unlimited, and Static Shock as part of the DC Animated Universe, Sunset Boulevardez in The Proud Family (2001–2005) and The Proud Family: Louder and Prouder (2022–2023), and Paulina in Danny Phantom (2004–2007).

== Early life ==
Canals-Barrera was born to Cuban parents of Catalan descent. Canals-Barrera also speaks Spanish and took drama classes in junior high school.

Canals-Barrera graduated from Hialeah-Miami Lakes Senior High School before winning a theatrical scholarship to the University of Miami.

== Career ==
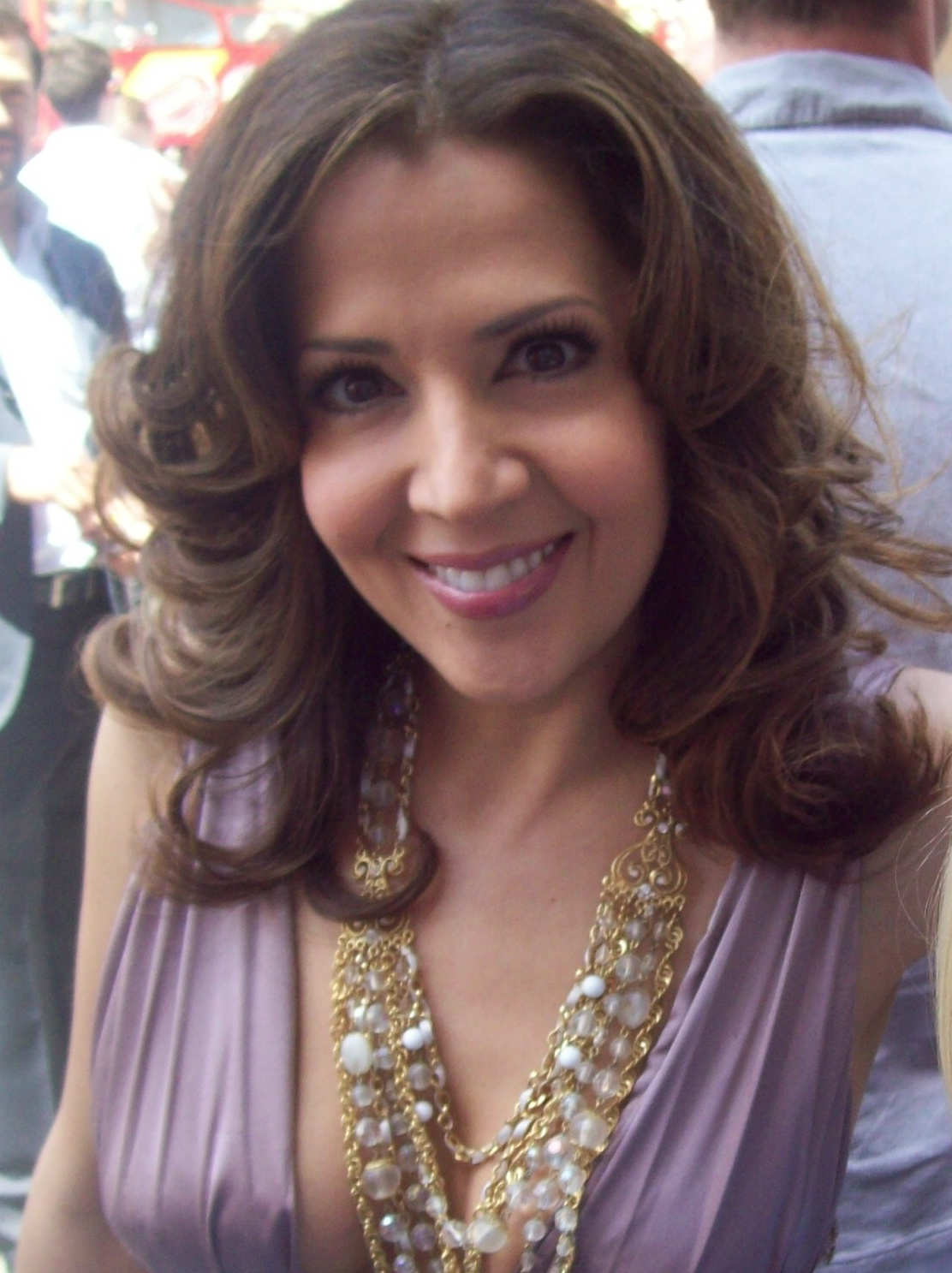
Canals-Barrera in 2007

In her early years, Canals-Barrera worked extensively in theater in both Miami and Los Angeles. In 1990, she starred as Amanda in a production of The Glass Menagerie. In 1992, she starred in a production of Brian Michael Riley's A Cradle of Sparrows. The same year, she began starring on Telemundo Spanish-language telenovela Marielena. She later had the recurring role in the short-lived 1993 Fox comedy-drama series, Key West. During the 1990s, Canals-Barrera also guest starred in a number of television series, such as 21 Jump Street, Murder, She Wrote, Almost Perfect, and Caroline in the City. In 1996, she starred as the title character in a production of Hedda Gabler. The next year she played Digna in a production of Guillermo Reyes' Chilean Holiday.

Her first regular role was on the short-lived NBC sitcom The Tony Danza Show in 1997. In early 2000s, Canals-Barrera had supporting roles in films America's Sweethearts, The Master of Disguise and Imagining Argentina. She has gained much recognition with comic book fans in recent years for her role as Hawkgirl/Shayera Hol on Bruce Timm's Justice League animated series (2001–04) and Justice League Unlimited (2005–06). She also had a recurring role in Static Shock as news reporter Shelly Sandoval, and in Danny Phantom as Paulina, the title character's high school crush. She also performed the voice of Mercedes "Meche" Colomar in the 1998 video game Grim Fandango. Canals-Barrera also played incidental characters in two episodes on the TV series The Boondocks ("Grandad's Fight" and "Home Alone").

From 2007 to 2012, Canals-Barrera co-starred as Theresa Russo, the mother of lead character Alex Russo (played by Selena Gomez), in the Disney Channel family sitcom Wizards of Waverly Place. She also co-starred in Wizards of Waverly Place: The Movie, a 2009 Disney Channel Original film based on the series. Canals-Barrera also appeared in the Disney Channel Original Movies Camp Rock (2008) and Camp Rock 2: The Final Jam (2010) as Connie Torres, the mother of Demi Lovato's character. In 2011, she appeared opposite Tom Hanks and Julia Roberts in the romantic comedy film Larry Crowne.

In 2014, Canals-Barrera was cast as Hilda in the ABC soap opera Members Only, created by Susannah Grant. However, it was cancelled by the network before its premiere. Later in that year she joined the cast of ABC comedy series Cristela, as Daniela Gonzalez.

On August 27, 2018, Canals-Barrera was cast as the mother of Fernando Hernandez-Guerrero-Fernandez-Guerrero on the Netflix series Fuller House.

She returned to Disney Channel in 2025 and 2026, as she reprised her role of Theresa Russo in season one and three of Wizards Beyond Waverly Place, and her role of Connie Torres in Camp Rock 3 in 2026.

== Personal life ==
Barrera has been married to fellow actor David Barrera since 1999, and they have two daughters, Bridget and Madeleine.

== Filmography ==
=== Film ===
Year	Title	Role	Notes	Ref.
1993	Cop and a Half	Mrs. Bobo #2		
1995	My Family	Young Irene		
2001	America's Sweethearts	Adinah		
2002	The Master of Disguise	Sophia		
2003	Imagining Argentina	Esme Palomares		
2003	Scooby-Doo! and the Monster of Mexico	Sofia Otero	Voice, direct-to-video	
2011	Larry Crowne	Lala Pinedo		
2012	Batman: The Dark Knight Returns – Part 1	Ellen Yindel	Voice, direct-to-video	
2013	Batman: The Dark Knight Returns – Part 2	Ellen Yindel	Voice, direct-to-video	
2013	Night of the Hipsters	Barbara	Short film	
2016	God's Not Dead 2	Catherine Thawley		
2017	Teen Titans: The Judas Contract	Bianca Reyes	Voice, direct-to-video	
2019	Sweet Inspirations	Bonnie	Voice, direct-to-video	
2022	Strong Fathers, Strong Daughters	Bella Flores		
2024	Dance Rivals	Rachel		
2024	Seven Cemeteries	Bruja		

=== Television ===
Year	Title	Role	Notes	Ref.
1990	21 Jump Street	Rosina	Episode: "La Bizca"	
1991	Super Force	Lori Wechsler	2 episodes	
1992–1993	Corte Tropical	Adrianita		
1992–1994	Marielena	Nancy	Recurring role	
1993	Harlan & Merleen	Carmen	Television film	
1993	Key West	Fig	Recurring role, 5 episodes	
1994	Viper	Carla	Episode: "Wheels of Fire"	
1994	Murder, She Wrote	Carmen	Episode: "Wheel of Death"	
1995	Almost Perfect	Carmen	Episode: "You Like Me, You Really Like Me"	
1996	Goode Behavior	Denise	Episode: "Goode Feelings"	
1997–1998	The Tony Danza Show	Carmen Cruz	Main role, 7 episodes	
1998	Caroline in the City	Maria	Episode: "Caroline and the Toothbrush"	
1998	Veronica's Closet	Dannie	Episode: "Veronica's a Partner Now"	
1999	Beggars and Choosers	Yolanda	Recurring role	
2000–2003	Static Shock	Shelly Sandoval, Hawkgirl	Voice, 14 episodes	
2000	Pepper Ann	Señorita Vivas	Voice, episode: "The Spanish Imposition"	
2000	That's Life		Episode: "Bad Hair Week"	
2001	Popular	Candy Box	Episode: "Fire in the Hole"	
2001	The Brothers García	Ms. Azteca	Episode: "Love Is Very... Confusing"	
2001–2002	Clifford the Big Red Dog	Teresa, Tonya	Voice, 2 episodes	
2001–2005	The Proud Family	Sunset Boulevardez	Voice, 19 episodes	
2001–2004	Justice League	Hawkgirl, Livewire	Voice, main role	
2002	American Family	Christy	Recurring role, 5 episodes	
2003	Miss Match	Store Manager	Episode: "Santa, Baby"	
2004	Curb Your Enthusiasm	Dalilah the Hygienist	2 episodes	
2004–2007	Danny Phantom	Paulina, additional voices	Voice, 15 episodes	
2005–2006	Justice League Unlimited	Hawkgirl	Voice, 11 episodes	
2005	The Proud Family Movie	Sunset Boulevardez, Newscaster Peanut	Voice, television film	
2005–2007	The Boondocks	Spanish TV Reporter, Costa Rican Woman	Voice, 2 episodes	
2006	George Lopez	Claudia	Episode: "A Funeral Brings George to His Niece"	
2006	Handy Manny	Peggy Salazar	Voice, episode: "Supremoguy/Tool Talk"	
2007	The Loop	Agent Denise	Episode: "Yeah, Presents"	
2007–2012	Wizards of Waverly Place	Theresa Russo	Main role, 84 episodes	
2008	Camp Rock	Connie Torres	Television film	
2009	Special Agent Oso	Additional voices	Episode: "Octo-Puzzle/One Suitcase Is Now Enough"	
2009	Wizards of Waverly Place: The Movie	Theresa Russo	Television film	
2010	Camp Rock 2: The Final Jam	Connie Torres	Television film	
2011	Generator Rex	Valentina	Voice, episode: "Outpost"	
2012	Pound Puppies	Dr. Trudy	Voice, 3 episodes	
2013	The Wizards Return: Alex vs. Alex	Theresa Russo	Television special	
2014	Baby Daddy	Carol Beltran	Episode: "Bonnie's Unreal Estate"	
2014	Gang Related	Marciela Acosta	2 episodes	
2014–15	Cristela	Daniela	Main role, 22 episodes	
2015	Members Only	Hilda	Main role; unaired television series	
2016	Ultimate Spider-Man	Rio Morales	Voice, 3 episodes	
2016	A Bronx Life	Angela	Television film	
2016	Last Man Standing	Sheryl	Episode: "Where There's Smoke, There's Ire"	
2016	The Big Bang Theory	Isabella	Episode: "The Brain Bowl Incubation"	
2017	Vixen: The Movie	Dr. Vargas	Voice, television film	
2017	Triangle	Alice		
2018	The Wedding Do Over	Irene Anderson	Television film	
2018	Knight Squad	Saffron	Episode: "Parent Teacher Knight"	
2018	Young & Hungry	Marisol	Episode: "Young & Mexico, Part 1"	
2018	Fuller House	Nadia	Episode: "Perfect Sons"	
2022	Madagascar: A Little Wild	Pilar	Voice, 4 episodes	
2022	Kenan	Loretta	2 episodes	
2022	Side Hustle	Roxie Rockhart	Episode: "Return of Uncle Nedward"	
2022	Lopez vs Lopez	Lily	Episode: "Lopez vs. Birthday"	
2022–2023	The Proud Family: Louder and Prouder	Sunset Boulevardez	Voice, 4 episodes	
2023	The Morning Show	Mercedes	2 episodes	
2024	Dora	Abuela	Voice	
2025–2026	Wizards Beyond Waverly Place	Theresa Russo	Special guest star; 2 episodes	
2026	Camp Rock 3	Connie Torres	Television film	

=== Video games ===
Year	Title	Role	Notes
1998	Grim Fandango	Mercedes 'Meche' Colomar	Voice
2011	Marvel vs. Capcom 3: Fate of Two Worlds	She-Hulk	Voice
2011	Ultimate Marvel vs. Capcom 3	She-Hulk	Voice
2015	Infinite Crisis	Hawkgirl	Voice

== Awards and nominations ==
Year	Award	Category	Work	Result	Refs
1998	Ovation Award	Outstanding Actress	Changes of Heart	Nominated	
1998	ALMA Award	Outstanding Actress in a Comedy Series	The Tony Danza Show	Nominated	
2002	ALMA Award	Outstanding Supporting Actress in a Television Series	The Brothers Garcia	Won	
2008	ALMA Award	Outstanding Female Performance in a Comedy Television Series	Wizards of Waverly Place	Nominated	
2008	Imagen Award	Best Supporting Actress – Television	Wizards of Waverly Place	Nominated	
2009	Imagen Award	Best Supporting Actress/Television	Wizards of Waverly Place	Nominated	
2009	ALMA Award	Actress in Television – Comedy	Wizards of Waverly Place	Nominated	
2010	Imagen Award	Best Supporting Actress – Television	Wizards of Waverly Place: The Movie	Won	
2011	Imagen Award	Best Supporting Actress – Television	Wizards of Waverly Place	Nominated	
2011	ALMA Award	Favorite TV Actress – Supporting Role	Wizards of Waverly Place	Won	
2013	Behind the Voice Actors Awards	Best Vocal Ensemble in a TV Special/Direct-to-DVD Title or Theatrical Short	Batman: The Dark Knight Returns, Part 1 (Shared with cast)	Nominated	
2014	Behind the Voice Actors Awards	Best Vocal Ensemble in a TV Special/Direct-to-DVD Title or Theatrical Short	Batman: The Dark Knight Returns, Part 2 (Shared with cast)	Nominated	
2015	Imagen Award	Best Supporting Actress – Television	Cristela	Nominated	
