= Anna Maria Perez de Tagle =

American actress and singer

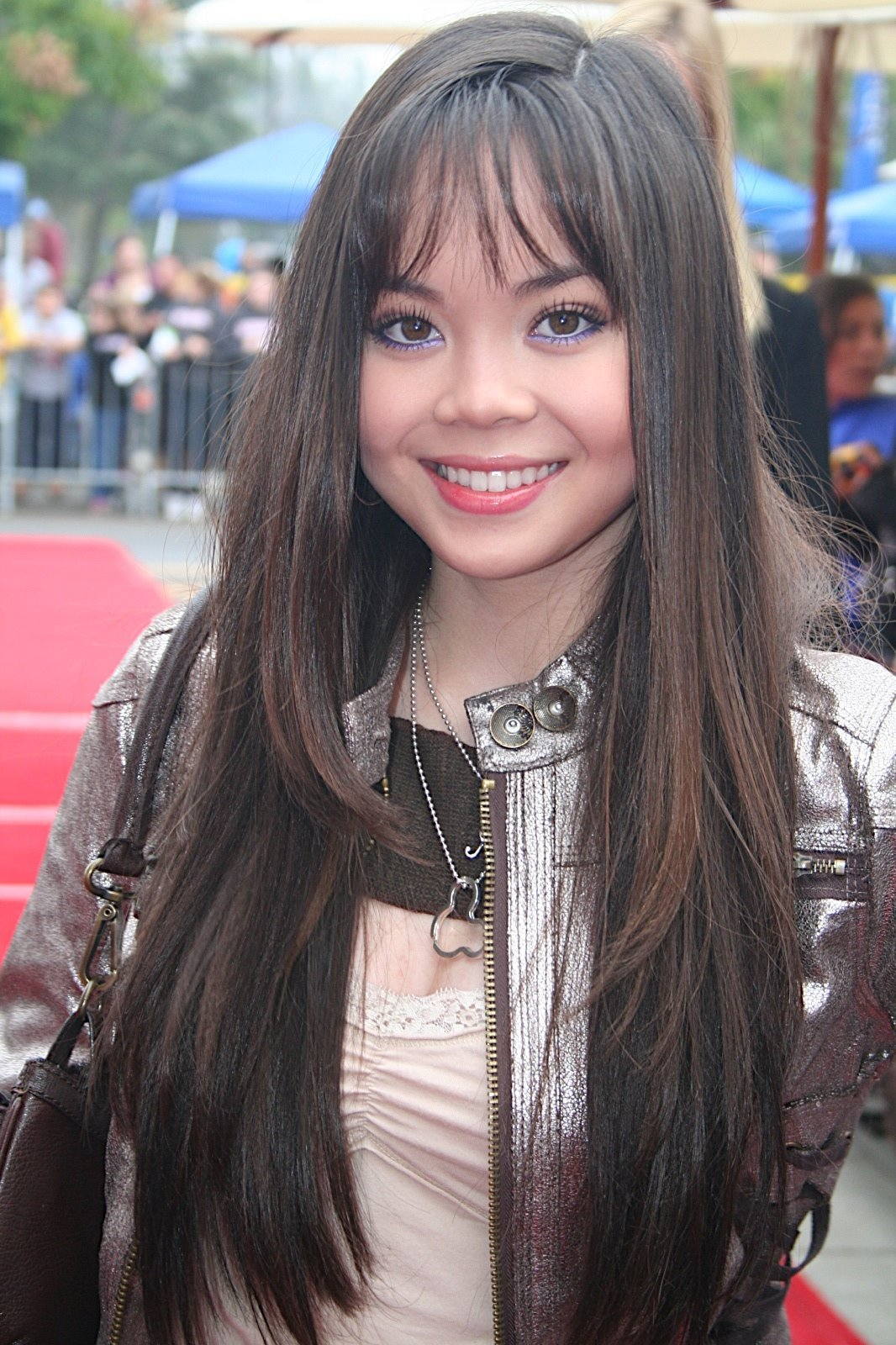
- Perez de Tagle in 2008
- Born: Anna Maria Francesca Enriquez Perez de Tagle; December 23, 1990 (age 35); San Francisco, California, U.S.
- Other name: Anna Maria Perez de Tagle-Kline
- Citizenship: United States; Philippines
- Occupations: Actress; singer
- Years active: 2005–present
- Spouse: Scott Kline Jr. (m. 2019)
- Children: 1
- Relatives: Sylvia La Torre (grandmother)

Anna Maria Francesca Enriquez Kline (née Perez de Tagle; born December 23, 1990) is an American actress and singer. She is known for her roles as Ashley Dewitt on Hannah Montana and Ella Pador on Camp Rock and Camp Rock 2: The Final Jam. She also played Miracle Ross on Cake and was in the 2009 film Fame, in which she starred as Joy Moy. In November 2011, she began starring on Broadway in the Godspell revival at the Circle in the Square theater in New York City.

== Early life ==
Anna Maria Francesca Enriquez Perez de Tagle was born in San Francisco, California, and is of Filipino ancestry. She is the daughter of TV personality Archie Perez de Tagle, and Evelyn Enriquez. Her grandmother Sylvia La Torre was also an actress and singer.

== Personal life ==
She got engaged to her boyfriend, Scott Kline Jr., on November 11, 2018. They were married on June 29, 2019. Actress Uzo Aduba served as her maid of honor. In December 2020, she announced her pregnancy with her first child. She gave birth to her daughter on June 10, 2021.

Perez de Tagle has dual American and Filipino citizenship.

== Filmography ==
=== Film ===
Year	Title	Role	Notes
2005	Bee Season	Bee Season No. 1	
2009	Fame	Joy Moy	
2015	The Worst People at a Party	Girl Holding Back a Fight	Short film
2017	Long Distance	Natalia	Short film
2020	The Message	Georgia Morales	

=== Television ===
Year	Title	Role	Notes
2006–2011	Hannah Montana	Ashley Dewitt	21 episodes Recurring role (Seasons 1–3) Guest star (Season 4)
2006	Cake	Miracle Ross	13 episodes; Main cast
2007	Just Jordan	Veronica	Episode: "Slippery When Wet"
2008	Higglytown Heroes	Safety Patrol Member Hero (voice)	Episode: "Wayne's Toasty Invention / Spell It Safe"
2008	Camp Rock	Ella Pador	Television film
2010	Jonas	Herself	Episode: "House Party"
2010	Camp Rock 2: The Final Jam	Ella Pador	Television film
2013	Baby Daddy	Jenna	Episode: "The Slump"
2018	Charmed	Lainey	Episode: "Bug a Boo"
2020	Two Talk With T Paige	Herself	Podcast Series EP:1

=== Web ===
Year	Title	Role	Notes
2009	KSM: Read Between the Lines	Herself	Episode: "Hangin' with the Jonas Brothers"; cameo

=== Theater ===
Year	Play	Role	Notes
2011	Godspell	Performer	2011 Broadway revival

=== As herself ===
2020	World's funniest Animal's	Panel member	Notes
2003	Star Search	Herself	Contestant
2008	Jonas Brothers: Living the Dream	Herself	
2008	Disney Channel Games	Herself	
2009	So You Think You Can Dance	Herself	Contestant

== Discography ==
Year	Title	Album
2008	"We Rock"	Camp Rock
2010	"Part of Your World"	DisneyMania 7
2010	"Can't Back Down"	Camp Rock 2: The Final Jam
2010	"It's On"	Camp Rock 2: The Final Jam
2010	"What We Came Here For"	Camp Rock 2: The Final Jam
2010	"Roses"	Anna Maria Perez de Tagle
2010	"Insomnia"	Anna Maria Perez de Tagle
2010	"Shot Down"	Anna Maria Perez de Tagle
2010	"Fame"	Anna Maria Perez de Tagle
2011	"Tower of Babble"	Godspell (New Broadway Cast Recording)
2011	"Prepare Ye"	Godspell (New Broadway Cast Recording)
2011	"Save the People"	Godspell (New Broadway Cast Recording)
2011	"Day by Day"	Godspell (New Broadway Cast Recording)
2011	"Learn Your Lessons Well"	Godspell (New Broadway Cast Recording)
2011	"Bless the Lord"	Godspell (New Broadway Cast Recording)
2011	"All Good Gifts"	Godspell (New Broadway Cast Recording)
2011	"We Beseech Thee"	Godspell (New Broadway Cast Recording)
2011	"Finale (Godspell)"	Godspell (New Broadway Cast Recording)

=== Music videos ===
Year	Title	Artist	Role	Notes
2008	"We Rock" (Cast Video)	Cast of Camp Rock	Herself / Ella Pador	
2008	"Start the Party"	Jordan Francis and Roshon Fegan	Ella Pador	
2009	"Remember December"	Demi Lovato	Herself	Cameo
2010	"It's On"	Cast of Camp Rock 2: The Final Jam	Ella Pador	
2010	"Part of Your World"	Herself		Her own music video
2010	"Roses"	Herself		Her own music video
