= Play My Music =

Single by Jonas Brothers

from the album Camp Rock
- Released: May 3, 2008
- Recorded: 2007
- Genre: Pop rock
- Length: 3:17
- Label: Walt Disney
- Songwriters: Kara DioGuardi; Mitch Allan
- Producer: Mitch Allan

Jonas Brothers singles chronology
"We Rock" (2008)	"Play My Music" (2008)	"Burnin' Up" (2008)

Camp Rock singles chronology
"We Rock" (2008)	"Play My Music" (2008)	"Start the Party" (2008)

"Play My Music" is a song by the American pop rock band Jonas Brothers. The song was released as the band's second single from the soundtrack album Camp Rock. This song is also featured in the DVD release of Disney's Have a Laugh! Volume 4 in Re-Micks musical short segment.

== Critical reception ==
Neil Genzlinger from The New York Times said that the song is the highlight of the film and "showing the verve and stage presence the other performers lack". Bob Smithouser from The Pluggedin said the song is one of the album's best along with "Start the Party", also saying that "We Rock" and "Play My Music" encourage people to follow their dreams.

== Live performances ==
The band performed the song at Cambio special from MTV on June 25, 2010. They also sang the song at Walmart Soundcheck, released on November 2 the same year. The song was included in their live album Jonas Brothers: The 3D Concert Experience, released on February 27, 2009.

== Charts ==
Chart (2008)	Peak position
Australia (ARIA)	71
Canada Hot 100 (Billboard)	22
Italy (FIMI)	35
Norway (VG-lista)	14
UK Singles (Official Charts)	57
US Billboard Hot 100	20
US Pop 100 (Billboard)	26

== Certifications ==
Region	Certification	Certified units/sales
Canada (Music Canada)	Gold	40,000^{‡}
United States (RIAA)	Platinum	1,000,000^{‡}
^{‡} Sales+streaming figures based on certification alone.
