= Stephen Joffe =

Canadian actor and singer

- Born: August 23, 1991 (age 35); Toronto, Ontario, Canada
- Education: National Theatre School of Canada
- Occupations: Actor, singer
- Years active: 1998–present
- Musical career
- Instruments: Vocals, mandolin

Stephen Joffe (born August 23, 1991) is a Canadian actor and singer. He is best known for his role as Alex in the television series Timeblazers.

== Early life ==
Joffe was born in Toronto, Ontario, on August 23, 1991, to a Jewish father and a religiously unaffiliated mother. He graduated from the National Theatre School of Canada in 2012.

== Career ==
Joffe begins his acting career when he appeared as Itchy in the children's television series Noddy.

Joffe went on to play the 8-year-old version of Noah Emmerich's character in the 2000 science fiction thriller film Frequency, featuring Dennis Quaid and Jim Caviezel.

Joffe played the role of Alan, the boyfriend of a dysfunctional woman, in the rework of The Crackwalker.

His television credits include P.R., Murdoch Mysteries, Life with Derek, Reign and Hudson & Rex.

From 2004 to 2006, he played the role of Alex in the American-Canadian television series Timeblazers.

== Personal life ==
He plays mandolin and is the lead singer of a Toronto-based alternative rock boy band called Birds of Bellwoods, in which he performs with fellow actor Kintaro Akiyama.

== Filmography ==
=== Film ===
Year	Title	Role	Notes
1999	Detroit Rock City	Six-Year-Old #1	
1999	The Wishing Tree	Jamie	
2000	Frequency	Gordo Hersch (8 years old)	
2014	The Path	Zeus	Short film
2014	Pushers	William	Short film
2014	Wet Bum	Rob	
2014	Bang Bang Baby	Bennett	
2014	The Anniversary	Nicky	
2017	White Night	Stevie	
2019	All About Who You Know	Austin	
2022	1Up	Riccardo	

=== Television ===
Year	Title	Role	Notes
1998–2000	Noddy	Itchy	7 episodes
1999	Love Letters	Andy (7 years old)	Television movie
2000	Dirty Pictures	Kevin Barrie	Television movie
2002	Terminal Invasion	Stephen	Television movie
2004–2006	Timeblazers	Alex	20 episodes Seasons 2-3
2006	Life with Derek	Jason	Episode: "Freaked Out Friday"
2007–2008	The Latest Buzz	Cody Herman	2 episodes
2014–2015	Max & Shred	Peter	8 episodes
2016	Reign	Felix	Episode: "Clans"
2017	Murdoch Mysteries	Clinton Hartley	Episode: "Master Lovecraft"
2018	Bajillionaires	Will Hedges	3 episodes
2019	Trapped: The Alex Cooper Story	Jason	Television movie
2020	Hudson & Rex	Ryan	Episode: "Old Dog, New Tricks"
2022	Transplant	DJ	Episode: "Saviours"
2023	Fargo	Lemley	4 episodes
