= Camp Rock 3 =

2026 musical television film

- Official release poster
- Based on: Characters by: Karin Gist; Regina Hicks; Julie Brown; Paul Brown
- Written by: Eydie Faye
- Directed by: Veronica Rodriguez
- Starring: Liamani Segura; Malachi Barton; Lumi Pollack; Hudson Stone; Casey Trotter; Brooklynn Pitts; Ava Jean; Milo Manheim; Maria Canals-Barrera; Sherry Cola; Demi Lovato; Joe Jonas; Kevin Jonas; Nick Jonas
- Music by: Tom Howe
- Country of origin: United States
- Original language: English

Production
- Executive producers: Spencer Berman; Tim Federle; Joe Jonas; Kevin Jonas; Nick Jonas; Demi Lovato; Gary Marsh; Betsy Sullenger
- Producer: Tracey Jeffrey
- Cinematography: Vincent De Paula
- Editor: Katie Abel
- Running time: 92 minutes
- Production companies: Potato Monkey Productions; Obstinate Headstrong Girl Productions; Chorus Boy Productions; Powered by Jonas; DLG Entertainment; Bearclaw Productions; Disney Kids & Family

Original release
- Network: Disney Channel
- Release: August 13, 2026

Related
- Camp Rock; Camp Rock 2: The Final Jam

Camp Rock 3 is a 2026 American musical television film directed by Veronica Rodriguez and written by Eydie Faye, serving as a legacy sequel to Camp Rock (2008) and Camp Rock 2: The Final Jam (2010). The Jonas Brothers, Maria Canals-Barrera, and Demi Lovato reprise their roles from the previous films, starring alongside Sherry Cola, Liamani Segura, Hudson Stone, Casey Trotter, Lumi Pollack, and Malachi Barton. It premiered on Disney Channel on August 13, 2026, and was released on Disney+ on August 14, 2026.

== Plot ==
Sage Scott and her younger brother Desi arrive at their first summer at Camp Rock. Their relationship is strained since Sage broke up their band to attend a music school. They meet drummer Cliff, cellist Rosie, aspiring dancer Callie, and popular social influencer Maddie with her backup dancers.

Meanwhile, the reunited Connect 3 of Shane, Nate, and Jason Gray, are preparing for tour when their manager Lark tells them that their opening act broke up. She insists they find a replacement, prompting Shane to suggest they go to Camp Rock. They decide to hold a competition there overseen by Lark with Callie as her assistant. Camp director Connie Torres confiscates campers' phones, which are not allowed at camp. Sage runs into Fletch Robinson, who has just arrived at camp in a police car since his mom passed away.

Campers perform Connect 3's song "Play My Music" for the competition's first challenge. Sage, Desi, Cliff, Rosie, Fletch, and Maddie and her backup dancers all advance. During a songwriting workshop, Sage is paired with Fletch, who praises her and performs a song dedicated to her. Meanwhile, Desi skips the workshop and discovers Callie dancing in the woods. He declines her invitation to join, admitting that he cannot dance. Later, Sage confides in Callie about her feelings for Fletch but remains determined to focus on the competition. Sage subsequently discovers a lyric book beneath a floorboard to Mitche, Connie's daughter.

The second challenge is a dance-focused task led by Callie while Lark eliminates contestants. Sage saves Desi from being eliminated by distracting Lark, causing her to bump into Maddie. Lark eliminates Maddie and her backup dancers, infuriating Maddie. Sage, Desi, Fletch, Rosie, and Cliff become the finalists. Desi asks Callie to give him dance lessons and she agrees. Maddie lures the finalists to the arts cabin, revealing that she has stolen and "bedazzled" their belongings. They get into a messy paint fight, which is broken up by Connie.

Lark introduces the final challenge: the finalists must stay inside a camp bus for 24 hours. By nightfall, Sage and the others bond, leading them to perform an impromptu song together. Unbeknownst to them, Maddie secretly records their performance to leak online and ruin the competition. Later that night, Fletch shares with Sage that he is waiting for a call from the courts to decide where he will live now that his mother has died. Sage promises not to tell anyone he still has his phone.

The next day, Connie finds Sage with Mitchie's lyric book and offers words of encouragement, which inspires Sage. Sage later finds Desi and the two reconcile before the finalists are summoned to Connie's office. A leaked video of their bus performance is circulating online, and Connie and Lark threaten to disqualify all of them from the competition if they do not confess who has a phone. Afraid, Sage prompts Fletch to confess. Sage later apologizes to Fletch, who forgives her. He informs her that he can still compete since Connie and Lark discovered that Maddie was behind the leak.

As preparations for Final Jam are underway, Connie receives a surprise visit from Mitchie, who requested a night off tour to come and watch Final Jam. Connect 3 act as judges and are impressed by the finalists’ performances. Before Sage performs, she gives a speech declaring that she would rather the other finalists be picked as the opening act for Connect 3. Sage begins her song and is surprised to see Desi, Fletch, Rosie, and Cliff join her on stage as her band. When Connect 3 go backstage to deliberate, Mitchie approaches them and offers advice, leading Connect 3 to announce that all five finalists will be on tour with them as a group. The group celebrates together with a final performance.

== Cast ==
- Liamani Segura as Sage Scott, Desi’s sister and Fletch’s love interest
- Malachi Barton as Fletch Robinson, Sage’s love interest
- Lumi Pollack as Rosie Kleinman
- Hudson Stone as Desi Scott, Sage’s brother
- Casey Trotter as Cliff Carmichael
- Brooklynn Pitts as Callie Banks
- Ava Jean as Madison
- Milo Manheim as Calvin Rhodes
- Maria Canals-Barrera as Connie Torres, Mitchie’s mom
- Sherry Cola as Lark
- Demi Lovato as Mitchie Torres, Connie’s daughter
- Joe Jonas as Shane Gray, the lead singer and band of Connect 3
- Kevin Jonas as Jason Gray, a member of the band Connect 3
- Nick Jonas as Nate Gray, a member of the band Connect 3
- Orlando Lucas as Daniel
- Ella Lucas as Danielle

== Production ==
The film was officially announced in September 2025, with the Jonas Brothers and Maria Canals-Barrera reprising their roles from Camp Rock (2008) and Camp Rock 2: The Final Jam (2010); the Jonas Brothers also serve as executive producers alongside Demi Lovato. On August 10, 2026, it was announced that Lovato would also be reprising her role as Mitchie Torres in a small capacity. Principal photography for the film began on September 15, 2025, in Vancouver, Canada. Filming wrapped on November 1.

== Reception ==
=== Critical response ===
Alex Berry from Radio Times rated the film 5.1 out of 10. Berry's review highlighted "The stakes rarely rise above a confiscated phone and the threat of disqualification, and it's crawling with cringe[...]"

== Music ==
The first single from the film's soundtrack, "One Beat Away" by Liamani and the film's cast, was released on July 1, 2026. A lyric video was released on July 1, 2026 on the Disney Music channel on YouTube.

== Release ==
Camp Rock 3 was released on August 13, 2026 on Disney Channel, and on Disney+ the next day.

== Awards and nominations ==
Award	Date of ceremony	Category	Recipient(s)	Results	Ref.
Nickelodeon Kids' Choice Awards	November 14, 2026	Watch Party: Kids' Choice	Camp Rock 3	Nominated	
