= We Rock (Camp Rock song) =

2008 single by Camp Rock cast

Single by Camp Rock cast

from the album Camp Rock
- Released: April 19, 2008 (Radio Disney); June 3, 2008 (iTunes)
- Recorded: 2007
- Genre: Pop rock
- Length: 3:11 (film version); 2:16 (music video)
- Label: Walt Disney
- Songwriters: Kara DioGuardi; Greg Wells
- Producer: Greg Wells

Demi Lovato singles chronology
"We Rock" (2008)	"This Is Me" (2008)

Jonas Brothers singles chronology
"When You Look Me in the Eyes" (2007)	"We Rock" (2008)	"Play My Music" (2008)

Camp Rock singles chronology
"We Rock" (2008)	"Play My Music" (2008)

Music video
- "We Rock" on YouTube

"We Rock" is the first official single by the cast of the 2008 Disney Channel television film Camp Rock and was featured on the soundtrack of the same name. It premiered on Radio Disney on April 19, 2008, and was released by Walt Disney Records onto the iTunes Store on June 3. The song was written by Kara DioGuardi and Greg Wells and produced by Wells. It featured vocals from Demi Lovato, Aaryn Doyle, Renee Sandstrom, Anna Maria Perez de Tagle, Roshon Fegan, Jordan Francis, Nick, Kevin, and Joe Jonas (Jonas Brothers), Alyson Stoner, Meaghan Martin and Kara DioGuardi as a background singer.

== Release ==
A preview of the song was shown on Disney Channel on New Year's Eve of 2007. Disney officially released the song on April 19, 2008. Disney also released a single CD, Exclusive Camp Rock Fan Pack of the song through Target retail stores only, on May 20; Target also sold other Camp Rock products as well, such as special edition novels, poster books, tote bags, clothing, etc. The Exclusive Camp Rock Fan Pack included the CD single, an instrumental version, the music video, a mini-poster, a ringtone, and more. "We Rock" is available on iTunes in two new versions. One of them is the song and an exclusive Radio Disney interview and another one is the music video and an exclusive Radio Disney interview with the Jonas Brothers.

== Music videos ==
The music video premiered on Disney Channel on April 19, 2008. It is an excerpt from the film where the cast of Camp Rock performs a shortened version of the song.

=== Around the World version ===
Disney Channel premiered the "We Rock - Around the World" music video on May 18, 2008. The music video features guest appearances from Disney Channel stars around the world including Selena Gomez, Jason Dolley, Mitchel Musso, and fans showing banners and the feature dance move of the song. This video was featured on the Camp Rock DVD.

=== Other music videos ===
Two music videos of the song was also included on the film's DVD. The first video was the "Cast Video", where the Camp Rock cast are on the set of the film, with they are dance and performing in certain scenes, along with the song in the finale scene. The second video is called "Crew Video", where Demi Lovato and Joe Jonas made introduction for the film's crew with the cast watching the show. As the crew are also dancing and performing the song at the Final Jam, including director Matthew Diamond.

== Charts ==
Chart (2008)	Peak position
Australian Hitseekers Singles Chart	7
Austria (Ö3 Austria Top 40)	70
Canada Hot 100 (Billboard)	41
UK Singles (Official Charts)	97
US Billboard Hot 100	33
US Hot Singles Sales (Billboard)	1
Venezuela Pop Rock (Record Report)	1
