= Camp Rock (soundtrack) =

Soundtrack album by Camp Rock cast
- Released: June 17, 2008
- Recorded: 2007
- Genres: Pop rock; Teen pop
- Length: 39:26
- Label: Walt Disney Records
- Producers: Mitch Allan; Antonina Armato; Kara DioGuardi; Andy Dodd; Toby Gad; Matthew Gerrard; Nikki Hassman; Jamie Houston; Tim James; Kovasciar Myvette; Robbie Nevil; Pam Sheyne; Adam Watts; Greg Wells

Camp Rock chronology
Camp Rock (2008)	Camp Rock 2: The Final Jam (2010)

Singles from Camp Rock
- 1. "We Rock" Released: April 19, 2008; 2. "Play My Music" Released: May 3, 2008; 3. "This Is Me" Released: June 17, 2008; 4. "Gotta Find You" Released: June 24, 2008

Professional ratings
Review scores
Source	Rating
AllMusic	2.5/5 stars

Camp Rock is the soundtrack album from the 2008 Disney Channel television film of the same name. It features lead vocals from American singers Demi Lovato, Joe, Kevin, Nick Jonas (Jonas Brothers), Roshon Fegan, Renee Sandstrom, Meaghan Martin, and Canadian singers Jordan Francis and Aaryn Doyle. The album was released on June 17, 2008, by Walt Disney Records. Full songs of the album were made available on Camp Rock's official web site for one week beginning on June 10, and the full soundtrack premiered on Radio Disney on June 14, during Planet Premiere: Camp Rock. The soundtrack was released in the United Kingdom one month later on July 14.

Camp Rock reached the top ten in six countries, among which peaked at number 3 on the US Billboard 200. It also topped the Soundtracks chart for four weeks. By September 2009, the Recording Industry Association of America (RIAA) certified the album platinum, after selling over a million copies in the country.

"We Rock" was the lead single from the soundtrack, released on April 19, 2008. It was followed by four other singles that were released for the promotion of the movie between May and June, which were: "Play My Music", "This Is Me", and "Gotta Find You".

== Background ==
The soundtrack album (both original and two-disc collector's edition) is an enhanced CD which contains a clip of an acoustic version of "This Is Me" when played on the computer with internet access. A karaoke/instrumental version of the Camp Rock soundtrack was released on November 16, 2008.

== Commercial performance ==
Camp Rock (Original Soundtrack) debuted and peaked at number three on the US Billboard 200 with 188,000 copies sold in its first week. It stayed in the top ten for ten weeks, selling around 100,000 copies each. Two months after release, on September 9, the Recording Industry Association of America (RIAA) certified the soundtrack Gold and Platinum, after selling over 1,000,000 copies in the country.

== Track listing ==
No.	Title	Writer(s)	Performer(s)	Length
1.	"We Rock"	Kara DioGuardi; Greg Wells	Cast of Camp Rock	3:14
2.	"Play My Music"	Kara DioGuardi; Mitch Allan	Jonas Brothers	3:21
3.	"Gotta Find You"	Adam Watts; Andy Dodd	Joe Jonas	4:03
4.	"Who Will I Be?"	Matthew Gerrard; Robbie Nevil	Demi Lovato	3:08
5.	"Start the Party"	Matthew Gerrard; Robbie Nevil	Jordan Francis	3:01
6.	"Hasta La Vista"	Toby Gad; Pam Sheyne; Kovasciar Myvette	Jordan Francis and Roshon Fegan	2:38
7.	"This Is Me"	Adam Watts; Andy Dodd	Demi Lovato and Joe Jonas	3:10
8.	"Here I Am"	Jamie Houston	Renee Sandstrom (Note: The song "Here I Am" was performed by Jasmine Richards in the film, but her voice was dubbed with the voice of Renee Sandstrom.)	3:47
9.	"Too Cool"	Toby Gad; Pam Sheyne	Meaghan Martin	2:53
10.	"Our Time Is Here" (bonus track)	Antonina Armato; Tim James	Demi Lovato, Meaghan Martin and Aaryn Doyle	3:26
11.	"2 Stars"	Adam Anders; Nikki Hassman	Meaghan Martin	2:55
12.	"What It Takes"	Antonina Armato; Tim James	Aaryn Doyle	2:43
Total length:				39:26

US Target and Japan deluxe edition DVD
No.	Title	Length
1.	"Rock On: Making of the Music"	6:43
2.	"Album preview: A Little Bit Longer by Jonas Brothers"	4:43
3.	"Start the Party"" (music video)	3:01
4.	"Camp Rock Scrapbook (Photo slideshow)"	2:53

European deluxe edition bonus tracks
No.	Title	Performer(s)	Length
13.	"Here I Am"	Brad Kavanagh
14.	"Gotta Find You" (acoustic version)	Joe Jonas
15.	"This Is Me" (acoustic version)	Demi Lovato
16.	"Play My Music" (acoustic version)	Jonas Brothers
17.	"Play My Music" (Remix)	Jonas Brothers
18.	"This Is Me" (Remix)	Demi Lovato, Joe Jonas
19.	"We Rock" (Remix)	Cast of Camp Rock

European deluxe edition DVD
No.	Title	Length
1.	"Rock On: Making of the Music"	6:43
2.	"Album preview: A Little Bit Longer by Jonas Brothers"	4:43
3.	"Album preview: Don't Forget by Demi Lovato"	5:01
4.	"We Rock" (music video)	3:01
5.	"Start the Party" (music video)	3:08
6.	"Play My Music" (music video)	3:10
7.	"Making of Start the Party"	2:38
8.	"Our Time Is Here" (music video)	3:47
9.	"Camp Rock Scrapbook (Photo slideshow)"	2:53

UK deluxe edition DVD
No.	Title	Length
1.	"Play My Music" (music video)	3:10
2.	"Here I Am" (music video)	2:38
3.	"Start the Party" (music video)	3:08
4.	"This Is Me" (music video)	3:47
5.	"We Rock" (music video)	3:01

== Charts ==
=== Weekly charts ===
Chart performance for Camp Rock
Chart (2008)	Peak position
Argentine Albums (CAPIF)	1
Australian Albums (ARIA)	13
Austrian Albums (Ö3 Austria)	3
Canadian Albums (Billboard)	2
Danish Albums (Hitlisten)	27
French Albums (SNEP)	23
German Albums (Offizielle Top 100)	9
Hungarian Albums (MAHASZ)	25
Mexican Albums (Top 100 Mexico)	2
New Zealand Albums (RMNZ)	5
Norwegian Albums (VG-lista)	10
Polish Albums Chart (ZPAV)	5
Portuguese Albums (AFP)	6
Spanish Albums (PROMUSICAE)	2
Swiss Albums (Swiss Hitparade)	32
UK Compilation Albums Chart (OCC)	13
UK Soundtrack Albums Chart (OCC)	2
US Billboard 200	3
US Top Soundtracks (Billboard)	1

=== Year-end charts ===
2008 year-end chart performance for Camp Rock
Chart (2008)	Position
US Billboard 200	26
US Top Soundtracks (Billboard)	4
US Kid Albums (Billboard)	3

2009 year-end chart performance for Camp Rock
Chart (2009)	Position
US Billboard 200	188
US Top Soundtracks (Billboard)	12
US Kid Albums (Billboard)	3

== Certifications and sales ==
Certifications and sales for Camp Rock
Region	Certification	Certified units/sales
Austria (IFPI Austria)	Gold	10,000^{*}
Brazil (Pro-Música Brasil)	Platinum	60,000^{*}
France (SNEP)	Gold	50,000^{*}
GCC (IFPI Middle East)	Gold	3,000^{*}
Ireland (IRMA)	Gold	7,500^{^}
Italy Sales in 2008	—	60,000
Mexico (AMPROFON)	Platinum	80,000^{^}
New Zealand (RMNZ)	Gold	7,500^{^}
Spain (Promusicae)	Platinum	80,000^{^}
United Kingdom (BPI)	Gold	100,000^{^}
United States (RIAA)	Platinum	1,000,000^{^}
^{*} Sales figures based on certification alone.^{^} Shipments figures based on certification alone.
