= Camp Rock 2: The Final Jam =

2010 American teen comedy television film

- US extended edition DVD cover
- Based on: Characters by: Karin Gist; Regina Hicks; Julie Brown; Paul Brown
- Written by: Karin Gist; Dan Berendsen; Regina Hicks
- Directed by: Paul Hoen
- Starring: Demi Lovato; Joe Jonas; Nick Jonas; Kevin Jonas; Maria Canals-Barrera; Meaghan Martin; Alyson Stoner
- Music by: Christopher Lennertz
- Countries of origin: United States; Canada
- Original language: English

Production
- Producer: Kevin Lafferty
- Cinematography: David A. Makin
- Editor: Girish Bhargava
- Running time: 104 minutes
- Production companies: Coin Flip Productions; Alan Sacks Productions

Original release
- Network: Disney Channel; Family Channel
- Release: September 3, 2010

Related
- Camp Rock; Camp Rock 3

Camp Rock 2: The Final Jam is a 2010 musical television film directed by Paul Hoen from a screenplay by Regina Hicks, Karin Gist, and Dan Berendsen. The 80th Disney Channel Original Movie and sequel to Camp Rock (2008), it stars Demi Lovato, the Jonas Brothers, Maria Canals-Barrera, Meaghan Martin, and Alyson Stoner. In the film, Camp Rock contends with Camp Star, a new, wealthy rival summer music camp.

Principal photography began in September 2009 and concluded one month later, with filming taking place on location across Ontario, including at Kilcoo Camp in Minden Hills, French River, Kingbridge Centre, and Earl Bales Park. Camp Rock 2: The Final Jam premiered on Disney Channel on September 3, 2010 and generated 7.7 million viewers in its premiere broadcast, setting the record for the highest viewed cable television film in 2010. A sequel, Camp Rock 3, was released in 2026.

== Plot ==
Mitchie Torres and her mother, Connie, return to Camp Rock for another summer. They see a new camp, Camp Star, has opened across from them and Mitchie and her friends notice there are fewer campers at Camp Rock. After Opening Jam, the camp's meet-and-greet, Camp Star send snacks to Camp Rock and invite them to their upcoming bonfire event that night. Brown Cesario, Camp Rock's director, is hesitant to attend as Camp Star was founded by Axel Turner, whom Cesario kicked out of his band years ago.

Most of Camp Rock attend at Mitchie's behest and they soon realize the bonfire was to set up an expensive, elaborate performance to entice their campers and counselors to join Camp Star; while few campers join (including Tess Tyler), several counselors make the switch. With minimal staff, Brown announces the closure of camp but Mitchie and her friends persuade him to keep it open after assuming roles as counselors. Meanwhile, during the performance, Axel's daughter, Dana, throws her bracelet into the audience and hit Nate Gray; after returning the bracelet, they begin to bond, but Dana is dismayed at Nate's indifference.

Mitchie and her friends initially struggle to settle into their role as counselors. Upset at being blindsided during their visit, they revisit Camp Star, who are shown to solely prioritize practicing music, with no space for other activities. Axel suggests broadcasting a competition between the camps on television, with the winner decided by a public vote; although reluctant, Mitchie agrees at the urging of her friends. This angers Brown, and Mitchie overhears him tell Connie that if Camp Rock were to lose, it could result in the permanent closure of the camp.

Mitchie urges focus on winning the competition, which frustrates other campers and Shane Gray, Mitchie's boyfriend, who returned to Camp Rock to spend time with her. Dismayed at this strict performance-oriented nature of camp, Shane and the other counselors organize a water balloon fight to improve the campers' spirits; this angers Mitchie, and she and Shane argue. The next day, Mitchie finds everyone rehearsing for the competition, led by Shane, and they reconcile. Meanwhile, Nate sneaks into Camp Star to express his feelings to Dana and is caught by Axel.

At the competition, Brown finds out Axel has spent exorbitant sums to ensure voting for Camp Star is easier than voting for Camp Rock. Camp Rock performs, accompanied by a video montage of camp activities, but Camp Star controversially wins the competition. Mitchie apologizes to Shane about not spending enough time with him and they kiss. Later that night at the final Camp Rock bonfire of the summer, many members of Camp Star, including Tess and Dana, opt to join Camp Rock, impressed at the camp's culture. This ensures enough campers for another summer.

== Cast ==
- Demi Lovato as Mitchie Torres, a young girl aspiring to be a singer, now returning for her second year at Camp Rock
- Joe Jonas as Shane Gray, the lead singer of the band Connect 3, Brown's nephew and Mitchie's love interest
- Nick Jonas as Nate Gray, a member of the band Connect 3 and Shane's younger brother
- Kevin Jonas as Jason Gray, a member of the band Connect 3 and Shane's older brother
- Maria Canals-Barrera as Connie Torres, Mitchie's mother
- Meaghan Martin as Tess Tyler, Mitchie's nemesis from the previous film, who later reformed
- Alyson Stoner as Caitlyn Gellar, a Camp Rock attendee and Mitchie's friend
- Chloe Bridges as Dana Turner, Axel's daughter and Nate's love interest
- Matthew "Mdot" Finley as Luke Williams, the lead singer of Camp Star
- Anna Maria Perez De Tagle as Ella Pador, a Camp Rock attendee and Mitchie's friend
- Jasmine Richards as Margaret "Peggy" Dupree, a Camp Rock attendee and Mitchie's friend
- Daniel Fathers as Brown Cesario, Camp Rock's camp director and Shane's uncle
- Roshon Fegan as Sander Loya, a Camp Rock attendee
- Daniel Kash as Axel Turner, Camp Star's founder and Brown's ex-bandmate
- Jordan "J" Francis as Barron James, a Camp Rock attendee
- Arisa Cox as Georgina Farlow, the host of Hitz TV, the television network covering Camp Wars
- Frankie Jonas as Trevor, one of the Junior Rockers

== Production ==
The film was shot in Ontario between September 3 and October 16, 2009, filming the scenes at Rockwood Conservation Area, Kilcoo Camp in Minden Hills, French River, The Kingbridge Centre in King City, and Earl Bales Park in Toronto.

== Reception ==
=== Critical response ===
On Rotten Tomatoes, Camp Rock 2: The Final Jam has an approval rating of 63% based on 5 reviews and an average of 6.1/10. Jennifer Armstrong from Entertainment Weekly enjoyed the film and called the performance of Demi Lovato "dependently appealing".

=== Ratings ===
Camp Rock 2: The Final Jam garnered 7.9 million viewers on its premiere night, the most for a film on cable television in 2010 and the most any cable program that week (August 30 – September 5). The film was also simulcast on Radio Disney, similar to the first installment of the franchise, but it is unknown if the ratings included the Radio Disney audience.

== Home media ==
Camp Rock 2: The Final Jam was released on DVD and Blu-ray on September 7, 2010, in the United States and Canada and was later available worldwide. Both the DVD and Blu-ray include the Extended Edition and the special feature Rock Along Edition, while the Blu-ray contains the featurette Getting To Know Camp Star's Newest Stars.

== Video game ==
A video game based on the film, Disney's Camp Rock: The Final Jam, was developed and published by Disney Interactive Studios. It was released in North America on August 31, 2010, and in Europe and Australia in September.

== Awards and nominations ==
Year	Ceremony	Award	Recipient	Result
2011	People's Choice Awards	Favorite Family TV Movie	Camp Rock 2: The Final Jam	Won
2011	Directors Guild of America	Outstanding Directorial Achievement in Children's Programs	Paul Hoen	Nominated
2013	Motion Picture Sound Editors	Best Sound Editing - Long Form Musical in Television	Camp Rock 2: The Final Jam	Nominated

== Sequel ==
A sequel, titled Camp Rock 3, was released in 2026. Canals-Barrera, Lovato and the Jonas Brothers reprise their roles, while the latter two also served as executive producers.
