= Jordan Francis =

Canadian actor, musician, producer and dancer

- Also known as: J-Man
- Born: May 10, 1991 (age 35); Toronto, Ontario, Canada
- Occupations: Actor, rapper, singer, dancer, choreographer
- Instrument: Vocals
- Years active: 1999–present
- Label: Hollywood Records

Jordan Francis (born May 10, 1991) is a Canadian actor, rapper, singer, dancer, and choreographer of Jamaican heritage.

== Career ==
Francis got his first acting role at the age of 7 and he recorded his first song when he was 11 years old. He later shifted to live theatre and he appeared as young Simba in Mirvish Productions' The Lion King at the Princess of Wales Theatre. In 2008, he got a role as Barron in the Disney Channel original movie Camp Rock (with Demi), and that same year, his song "Hasta La Vista" was number 43 on Billboard's music charts. In 2010, he appeared in the Family Channel series Connor Undercover as the titular hero's sidekick Whynot. In 2012, he did a Canadian cross-country tour for CBC and its interactive TV series Cross Country Fun Hunt.

== Filmography ==
=== Film ===
Film
Year	Title	Role	Notes
2002	Our America	Derrick Morris	
2003	Honey	Dancer	
2008	Camp Rock	Barron James	Main role
2010	Camp Rock 2: The Final Jam	Barron James	Main role

=== Television ===
Television
Year	Title	Role	Notes
1999	Real Kids, Real Adventures	Shuggie	Guest appearance
2002–2006	The Save-Ums!	Custard	Voice, main role
2003	The Music Man	Dancer	
2004	Da Boom Crew	Justin	Voice, main role
2005	This Is Wonderland	Owen Smith	
2005–2011	Carl²	Jamie James	Voice, main role
2010	Connor Undercover	Whynot	Main role
2011	My Life Me	Theme music performer	
2013	Cross Country Fun Hunt	Himself	Main role

== Tours ==
- 2010: Jonas Brothers Live in Concert (guest act)
