= Camp Rock =

2008 musical television film

- Extended Rock Star Edition DVD cover
- Written by: Karin Gist; Regina Hicks; Julie Brown; Paul Brown
- Directed by: Matthew Diamond
- Starring: Demi Lovato; Joe Jonas; Meaghan Jette Martin; Maria Canals Barrera; Alyson Stoner; Kevin Jonas; Nick Jonas
- Composer: David Kitay
- Countries of origin: United States; Canada
- Original language: English

Production
- Producer: Kevin Lafferty
- Cinematography: Dean Cundey
- Editor: Girish Bhargava
- Running time: 99 minutes
- Production companies: Sudden Motion Productions; Alan Sacks Productions

Original release
- Network: Disney Channel; Family Channel
- Release: June 20, 2008

Related
- Camp Rock 2: The Final Jam; Camp Rock 3

Camp Rock is a 2008 musical television film directed by Matthew Diamond from a screenplay by Karin Gist, Regina Hicks, Julie Brown, and Paul Brown. The 73rd Disney Channel Original Movie (DCOM), the film stars the Jonas Brothers, Meaghan Jette Martin, Maria Canals-Barrera, Daniel Fathers, Alyson Stoner, and introducing Demi Lovato. In the film, aspiring teenage singer Mitchie Torres (Lovato) visits Camp Rock, a summer music camp.

The film premiered on Disney Channel on June 20, 2008. Camp Rock was the second DCOM to air on ABC's The Wonderful World of Disney after its premiere on Disney Channel and was placed on the iTunes Store for digital purchase shortly after its premiere. The film was watched by 8.9 million viewers on the night of its premiere and is currently the third highest viewed DCOM of all time, behind High School Musical 2 and Wizards of Waverly Place: The Movie. A sequel, Camp Rock 2: The Final Jam, premiered on September 3, 2010, and a third film, Camp Rock 3, premiered on August 13, 2026.

== Plot ==
Shy singer Mitchie Torres and her family are unable to afford the fees required to attend Camp Rock, a summer music camp. Her mother, Connie, a chef, is hired to cater food for the camp, which enables Mitchie to attend at a discounted rate. Her mother tasks Mitchie to help her in the kitchen when not performing camp duties. Upon arrival, Mitchie meets fellow camper Caitlyn Gellar, an aspiring music producer.

Shane Gray, the spoiled lead singer of the pop music trio Connect 3, returns to Camp Rock at his bandmates' behest to rehabilitate Shane's public image. Shane assumes a position as a dance instructor and is required to record a song with the winner of Final Jam, the camp's closing singing competition. Shane overhears Mitchie singing in a hall; unable to see her before she leaves, he obsesses over finding her, with the camp knowing he is searching for the girl with "the voice".

During Opening Jam, a camp meet-and-greet, Mitchie learns the campers are rich or well-connected. Embarrassed at being able to attend camp only due to Connie's catering, Mitchie lies to Tess Tyler (the popular daughter of singer TJ Tyler) and her friends Ella Pador and Margaret "Peggy" Dupree that her mother is the president of the Chinese department of the music channel Hot Tunes TV. Impressed, Tess invites Mitchie to join her group at the disappointment of Caitlyn, who advises against Mitchie becoming friends with Tess.

During lunch, an argument between Tess and Caitlyn escalates to a food fight. Tess portrays Caitlyn as the aggressor of the dispute to Brown Cesario, the camp's director and Shane's uncle; Brown punishes Caitlyn by making her work in the kitchen. Mitchie, worried Caitlyn will learn about her secret, does not defend her, to Caitlyn's annoyance.

Shane shares a song with Mitchie, which is a stylistic departure to his previous music with Connect 3. Doubtful his record label and fans would accept a change in musical direction, Mitchie expresses she likes the song. As Caitlyn arrives in the kitchen and learns about Mitchie's secret, they argue but reconcile at Pajama Jam, a pajama party music showcase, after Mitchie stands up to Tess when Tess attempts to upstage Caitlyn's performance.

Jealous at seeing Mitchie and Shane together, Tess follows her and learns of her secret. Tess exposes Mitchie in front of campers; Shane, believing Mitchie lied to him solely to be with him because he is famous, breaks their friendship and Mitchie becomes excluded from the group. Tess then deduces Mitchie is the mysterious singer. On the eve of Final Jam, Tess frames Mitchie and Caitlyn for stealing her bracelet, and Brown bans them from all camp activities until the end of Final Jam.

At Final Jam, which is judged by Connect 3, Peggy and Ella argue with Tess and opt not to perform with her as planned; Ella performs with fellow campers Barron James and Sander Loyer. Tess stumbles during her performance after her mother TJ attends and takes a call, and then retreats backstage in tears. Peggy performs a solo song as Final Jam's closing act and eventual winner. When Brown announces the end of Final Jam, Mitchie and Caitlyn make the spotlights flicker; he lets them go on stage, proud they understood their ban was only until "the end of Final Jam". As Mitchie sings, Shane realizes she is the mysterious singer, and they reconcile by singing together. Backstage, Tess apologizes to Peggy and Ella and tells Brown that she staged the theft of her bracelet. The entire group gathers and sings "We Rock".

In the extended ending, Caitlyn invites Mitchie, Tess, Peggy, Lola and Ella to the recording studio she built in her garage.

== Cast ==
- Demi Lovato as Mitchie Torres, a young girl aspiring to be a singer
- Joe Jonas as Shane Gray, the spoiled and arrogant lead singer of the popular music trio Connect 3.
- Meaghan Jette Martin as Tess Tyler, a shallow and self-centered girl known as the "diva of Camp Rock"
- Alyson Stoner as Caitlyn Gellar, a Camp Rock attendee whom Mitchie befriends
- Maria Canals Barrera as Connie Torres, Mitchie's mother and Camp Rock's new cook
- Daniel Fathers as Brown Cesario, Shane's uncle and Camp Rock's camp director
- Julie Brown as Dee La Duke, Camp Rock's musical director
- Anna Maria Perez De Taglé as Ella Pador, a Camp Rock attendee and Tess's friend
- Jasmine Richards as Peggy Dupree, a Camp Rock attendee and Tess's friend
  - Renee Sands as Peggy's singing voice
- Jordan "J-Man" Francis as Barron James, a Camp Rock attendee and rapper
- Roshon Fegan as Sander Loya, a Camp Rock attendee and rapper
- Kevin Jonas as Jason Gray, a member of the popular music trio Connect 3 and Shane's older brother
- Nick Jonas as Nate Gray, a member of the popular music trio Connect 3 and Shane's younger brother
- Aaryn Doyle as Lola, a Camp Rock attendee and singer
- Giovanni Spina as Andy, a Camp Rock attendee and drummer
- Ed Jaunz as Steve Torres, Mitchie's father
- Jennifer Ricci as T.J. Tyler, Tess's mother and a famous singer

== Production ==
Camp Rock was filmed between September and October 2007 at YMCA Camp Wanakita in Haliburton, Ontario, and Kilcoo Camp in Minden, Ontario.

== Soundtrack ==
The Camp Rock soundtrack features lead vocals from Demi Lovato, Jonas Brothers, Roshon Fegan, Renee Sandstrom, Meaghan Martin, Jordan Francis and Aaryn Doyle. It was released on June 17, 2008, by Walt Disney Records. Full songs of the album were made available on Camp Rock's official web site for one week beginning June 10, and the full soundtrack premiered on Radio Disney on June 14, during Planet Premiere: Camp Rock. The soundtrack was released in the United Kingdom one month later on July 14.

The album reached top ten in six countries, among which peaked at number 3 for four weeks on the US Billboard 200 album charts, selling over 188,000 units in its first week. It also topped the Soundtrack chart in the country. The album was certified Platinum by the Recording Industry Association of America (RIAA) after selling over a million copies in the United States. In Brazil, Mexico and Spain, the album was also certified platinum by the PMB, AMPROFON and PROMUSICAE respectively.

== Release and marketing ==
=== Home media ===
The DVD and Blu-ray of the film, titled Camp Rock: Extended Rock Star Edition, was released by Walt Disney Studios Home Entertainment on August 19, 2008. It was released in November in other countries, and on December 1 in the United Kingdom, only on DVD. Both the DVD and Blu-ray release contains an extended ending with an additional musical number ("Our Time Is Here"), the music videos, sing-along and karaoke functions, a gallery and more bonus features.

=== Merchandise ===
Merchandise of the film is sold at Target, Claire's, and Limited Too. They include clothing (such as pajamas, T-shirts, and underwear), bags (tote bags, backpacks, etc.), bedding collection, toys, and dolls of the characters. Play Along Toys, so far, has only released dolls of Mitchie and Shane. A novelization of the film, Camp Rock: The Junior Novel, by Lucy Ruggles, was released by Disney on May 13, 2008. Target retail stores sell "special editions" of the novel, hardcover books that include photos.

== Reception ==
=== Ratings ===
Camp Rock premiered on Disney Channel in the United States on June 20, 2008, with 8.9 million viewers, being the second most viewed Disney Channel Original Movie at the time, only behind High School Musical 2 (2007). Its June 21 showing on ABC had 3.47 million viewers, and its June 22 showing on ABC Family had 3.73 million viewers, according to Nielsen SoundScan. The DVD topped the national home video sales chart for the week ending August 24. The film's premiere in Canada became Family Channel's second-most-watched film ever, also behind High School Musical, with 848,000 viewers. Its Disney Channel Italy premiere received 1.14 million viewers in September. According to Billboard the film attracted an audience of 146 million viewers in 160 nations and 30 languages.

=== Critical response ===
The film received moderate reviews from critics. On the review aggregator website Rotten Tomatoes, the film has a rating of 48% based on 21 reviews, with an average rating of 4.4/10. The website's critics consensus reads: "Camp Rock wants to be the next High School Musical, but its forgettable songs and dull premise hold it back". Metacritic, which uses a weighted average, assigned the film a score of 64 out of 100, based on 16 critics, indicating "generally favorable" reviews.

Brian Lowry of Variety stated that "it's difficult not to grudgingly admire the marketing savvy with which Camp Rock was assembled". New York Post critic Austin Smith called it a "really great movie, like a modern-day version of an old Judy Garland-Mickey Rooney picture" in which the kids "put on a show that improves the lives of all who see it". Barry Garron of The Hollywood Reporter admired Matthew Diamond's "solid enough" direction and Demi Lovato's performance. He also said that with Camp Rock, "Disney plucks another fresh face off its deep bench of young talent". Robert Lloyd of Los Angeles Times wrote that the film "isn't particularly good, but it's good at what it does", and called it "inauthentic". USA Today's Robert Blanco called the film "simultaneously overdone and underproduced" and said that "it jerks its way from point to point without bothering to explain the characters' behavior or inject any life into its musical numbers". Entertainment Weekly's Gillian Flynn said "the strange and objectionable thing about the film's morality tale is that no one makes an outright decision to be brave or better", and called it "so rigidly formulated and unremarkable" that by the time the cast sings its finale, We Rock, "it's hard to agree".

Following the critics' line of comparison to High School Musical, Jennifer Frey of The Washington Post said that Camp Rock's music is "in the same easy-to-memorize, dance-inspiring mode" as that of the previous franchise, "but not as catchy". Daily News's David Hinckley agreed, saying that "the songs don't feel as fresh" and "the film is specifically designed to ride on the success of the previous one", but he praised its formula that "goes back to the animated Disney classics of decades past", and called it "catchy and fun, a rock-steady Disney hit". Hinckley also praised the talent and performance of leads Joe Jonas and Lovato.

In 2016, Billboard's Maria Sherman named Camp Rock Lovato's best film to date, describing it as "something of a coming of age tale, one not only about believing in yourself, but accepting yourself". USA Today added Camp Rock to the top ten best summer camp movies of all time. Rebecca Alter of Vulture ranked the film as one of the best Disney Channel Original Movies of all time.

== Sequels ==
=== Camp Rock 2: The Final Jam ===
A sequel, Camp Rock 2: The Final Jam, was released on September 3, 2010. Lovato, the Jonas Brothers, Martin, Canals-Barrera, Fathers, and Stoner reprise their roles, with Daniel Kash, Matthew "Mdot" Finley, and Chloe Bridges joining in new roles. Premiering on Disney Channel, it reached a total of 7.9 million viewers on its first broadcast, the most for a film on cable television in the year. The film was directed by Paul Hoen and written by Dan Berendsen, Karin Gist and Regina Hicks. It was shot in Ontario, Canada, from September 3 to October 16, 2009, filming scenes at the French River, Kilcoo Camp, The Kingbridge Centre, and Earl Bales Park. It was the last sequel of a Disney Channel Original Movie until Teen Beach 2 in 2015.

=== My Camp Rock ===
My Camp Rock, a singing competition based on Camp Rock, aired between 2009 and 2010. It had five international editions: a Scandinavian, Spanish, Benelux, French and British version, the original. It invited viewers to log online and make a video of themselves singing "This Is Me" and "We Rock" as a group, a duet or a solo. The competition was open to children aged 8 to 16. The best 8 entries were picked to participate in the TV show, and to attend a four-day Camp Rock-style singing and dancing workshop. They had the opportunity to demonstrate their musical talent to the panel of judges through a range of music and physical activities. In the Final Jam, the viewers' vote decided the winner. The prize for the winner was to have their version of a song from the film professionally recorded and released along with a music video. The winner of the British edition was Holly-Anne Hull, 14, from Camberley, Surrey.

=== Camp Rock 3 ===
In September 2025, it was officially announced that a third film, Camp Rock 3 had entered production, with Lovato executive producing and the Jonas Brothers and Canals-Barrera reprising their roles. Principal photography began on September 15, 2025, in Vancouver, Canada. Filming wrapped on November 1. It is set to premiere on Disney Channel on August 13, 2026, and to be available on Disney+ the following day.
