= Nikki Leonti =

American singer-songwriter and actress (born 1981)

- Also known as: Nikki Leonti Edgar
- Born: Nicole Marie Leonti; August 20, 1981 (age 45)
- Origin: Corona, California, United States
- Genres: Contemporary Christian, urban, R&B
- Occupations: Singer, songwriter
- Instrument: Voice
- Years active: 1996–present
- Labels: Pamplin, Reprise

Nikki Leonti-Edgar (born August 20, 1981) is an American singer-songwriter. Prior to her work in urban, R&B, and electronic dance music, Leonti recorded contemporary Christian music albums. She lent her vocals to over 250 songs during 4 seasons of the musical comedy-drama television series Glee.

== Early life ==
Nicole Marie Leonti was born on August 20, 1981, in Corona, California. Her father Greg Leonti was a pastor at the Calvary Southern Baptist church. She began singing at age five, as a church soloist in the Nondenominational Christianity church in Corona. At 13, she made her first recording on a small local label.

== Career ==
In 1996 she recorded her first-full-length album, Reach the World. In 1998, Leonti recorded her second full-length album, Shelter Me, which reached No. 179 on the Billboard 200, and No. 7 on the Contemporary Christian chart. Her third album, Nikki Leonti was released in 2001. Both were produced by brothers Dino and John Elefante, and issued on the independent Christian label, Pamplin. Shortly after her 18th birthday, Leonti got pregnant out of wedlock and was shunned by the CCM community with many Christian music stations pulling off broadcasting of her records. She retired from the Christian music industry not long after.

In 2006, Leonti was hired as a backup singer for Carrie Underwood, performing on tour and on various television shows. After three years with Carrie Underwood, Leonti began working with Rich Velonskis, forming the R&B group, Nikki & Rich, retro neo-soul duo. Velonskis, also known as Rich Skillz, producer of various artists, including Ludacris, Lil' Kim, and Robin Thicke. Nikki & Rich released their debut album, entitled Greatest Hits, on September 27, 2011, issued on the Reprise Records/Born Rich label. The duo has performed live on Ellen and The Tonight Show with Jay Leno. Together, they were named as one of the New York Post's "10 New Artists to Watch in 2010" and "10 Artists to Know in 2011". Nikki & Rich confirmed their split in January 2015.

Nikki lent her vocals to over 100 songs during 4 seasons of the Fox hit show, Glee. She has written songs for artists, including Robin Thicke, Jessie J, Candice Glover, Rebecca Ferguson and Ivy Quainoo.

In early 2015, Nikki announced that she had founded a band called Edgar with her husband Ryan Edgar, whom she married in November 2014. On June 7, 2016, she appeared alongside her husband and daughter Jaslyn as a trio on America's Got Talent, auditioning on episode 2 of season 11. They performed "I'll Stand by You" by The Pretenders. The group progressed through the preliminary rounds and took one of 36 live performance show spots.

In 2018, she performed alongside Crystal Lewis, Stacie Orrico and Rachael Lampa for a special event called REUNITE CCM.

In 2019, Nikki started working full-time as a songwriter for television and film, as well as theatrical and animation. She has written music in various commercials that include; Samsung, Aerie, Ford, Victoria's Secret, and Toyota, to name a few. She's had her original music featured in hundreds of television episodes and has been a consistent song contributor for the Disney Channel.

== Personal life ==
Leonti was married in 1999 to Ryan Gingerich, lead guitarist of the Christian band, Scarecrow & Tinmen. They divorced in 2002, having become the parents of one daughter, Jaslyn (b. 2000). They later discovered the marriage was never legally documented. In 2004, she married Aaron Dame and gave birth to their son, Jordan (b. 2004).

She married singer-songwriter Ryan Edgar on November 6, 2014. Ryan Edgar and Leonti have a daughter, Frankie (b. 2015).

== Discography ==
Solo

- 1996: Reach the World (Two Records)
- 1998: Shelter Me (Pamplin)
- 2000: Postcard From Mixaco: A Dance Re-MIX Fiesta (Pamplin)
- 2001: Nikki Leonti (Pamplin)
- 2017: Heartache Easy (FamJam)
- 2019: Joybird (Position Music)
- 2023: Joybird "Real Thing" (Position Music)

Nikki & Rich

- 2011: Greatest Hits... (Born Rich Inc)

Adeline River

- 2021: Adeline River... (Position Music)

=== Appearances on other recordings ===
- 2000: "Everlasting Place" Apocalypse III: Tribulation (performer)
- 2002: "Everytime" Left Behind II Tribulation Force: Urban Hip Hop (performer)
- 2004: Rachel Lampa (background vocals for Rachel Lampa)
- 2005: "Awaken" Awaken (background vocals for Natalie Grant)
- 2006: "In a Little While" (new studio version)" Time Again... Amy Grant Live (background vocals for Amy Grant)
- 2008: "Get Onboard" Spirit I Am (background vocals and handclapping for Eric Bibb)
- 2009: "Make U Love Me" Sex Therapy: The Session (songwriter for Robin Thicke)
- 2010: "Cat and Mouse" Killers (songwriter)
- 2012: Glee season 3 (background vocals)
- 2012: "All You Need Is Love" Cee Lo's Magic Moment (background vocals for CeeLo Green)
- 2012: "Nothing's Gonna Stop Me Now" Girl vs. Monster (songwriter for Olivia Holt)
- 2013: "Campfire" Wolf (arrangement and vocals for Tyler, the Creator)
- 2013: Glee season 4 (background vocals)
- 2013: "Crusin' for a Bruisin" & "Coolest Cats in Town" Teen Beach Movie (songwriter)
- 2013: "Heart Attack" Demi (background vocals for Demi Lovato)
- 2014: "I'll Be the One" and "Single Cross Earring" Eternity: The Movie (songwriter and performer)
- 2014: "Time For Fun" and "My Friend" The Little Rascals Save the Day (performer)
- 2014: "Burial" Wildfires (Light It Up) (songwriter for Ivy Quainoo)
- 2014: Glee season 5 (background vocals)
- 2014: "Same Kinda Man" Music Speaks (songwriter for Candice Glover)
- 2015: "That's How We Do" Teen Beach 2 (songwriter)
- 2015: "100 Grandkids" & "Perfect Circle/Godspeed" GO:OD AM (background vocals for Mac Miller)
- 2015: "Light On" Freedom (songwriter for Rebecca Ferguson)
- 2015: Rod Stewart (background vocals for Rod Stewart)
- 2015: "You'll Never Walk Alone" Stages (background vocals for Josh Groban)
- 2015: "Zero to Hero" We Love Disney (background vocals for Ariana Grande)
- 2015: "What A Girl Is" Liv and Maddie: Music from the TV Series (songwriter for Dove Cameron)
- 2016: The Passion: New Orleans - Music From the Live Television Event (background vocals)
- 2016: "My Superstar" Ice Age: Collision Course (songwriter for Jessie J) - listed as Nicole Leonti
- 2016: "123 Victory" Losing My Religion (background vocals for Kirk Franklin)
- 2016: "I See A Victory" Hidden Figures (background vocals for Kim Burrell & Pharrell Williams) - listed as Nicole Leonti
- 2016: "When You Held Me" The Magic of Life (with Alberto De la Rocha)
- 2017: Dirty Dancing (background vocals)
- 2017: Captain Underpants: The First Epic Movie (background vocals)
- 2017: "Everybody Get Nuts" The Nut Job 2: Nutty by Nature (songwriter for Luke Edgemon)
- 2017: "You and Me" Descendants 2 (songwriter)
- 2018: "Fired Up" Zombies (songwriter)
- 2018: This Christmas Day (background vocals for Jessie J)
- 2018: "Never Alone" Hiding Place (background vocals for Tori Kelly)
- 2018: "You're a Mean One, Mr. Grinch" The Grinch (arrangement and vocals for Tyler, the Creator)
- 2018: "Buttons" (Arrangement and background vocals for Mac Miller)
- 2019: Perfect Harmony (performer)
- 2019: A Pentatonix Christmas (background vocals for Pentatonix)
- 2019: "War Baby" Please Excuse Me for Being Antisocial (arrangement and vocals for Roddy Ricch)
- 2020: Kelly Clarkson Show (appeared as a background vocalist on several episodes)
- 2020: Eurovision Song Contest (background vocals)
- 2021: The Prom (performer)
- 2021: Arlo the Alligator Boy (arrangement and background vocals)
- 2022: Monarch (background vocals)
- 2022: "Fired Up" Zombies 3 (songwriter)
- 2022: Sneakerella (background vocals)
- 2022: "Take The Chance" Together We Can (with Crystal Lewis)
- 2023: Big Nate (background vocals)
- 2023: Journey to Bethlehem (performer)
- 2023: "Turn Your Eyes Upon Jesus" The Hymns (with The Katinas)
- 2024: American Idol (background vocals)
- 2024: Met Gala (background vocals for Cynthia Erivo & Ariana Grande)
- 2024: Lil Nas X (background vocals)
- 2024: Jessie Murph (background vocals)
- 2024: "Pull Me In" and "The One" Return to Love (performer)
- 2024: Hot Frosty (songwriter & performer)
- 2024: Irish Wish (songwriter & performer
- 2026: "Gut Punch" Sunday Best (background vocals for Nick Jonas)

== Filmography ==
Film and television roles
Year	Title	Role	Notes
2013	Californication	Band Musician	Episode: "I'll Lay My Monsters Down"
2014	Eternity: The Movie	Gina Marie	Film
2016	America's Got Talent	Herself	Contestant; season 11
