= Carla Jeffery =

American actress (1993–2026)

- Jeffery in 2022
- Born: Carla Jaran Jeffery; July 10, 1993; Houston, Texas, U.S.
- Died: September 1, 2026 (aged 33)
- Occupation: Actress
- Years active: 2006–2026
- Relatives: Carlon Jeffery (twin brother)

Carla Jaran Jeffery (July 10, 1993 – September 1, 2026) was an American actress best known for playing the cheerleader Bree in Disney Channel's Zombies film franchise.

== Early life ==
Jeffery was born in Houston, Texas on July 10, 1993. Her twin brother, Carlon Jeffery, also became an actor, appearing on Disney Channel's A.N.T. Farm as Cameron Parks. According to the Hindustan Times, Carlon's interest in music and entertainment reportedly helped inspire the family's move from Ohio to California, and Jeffery began taking acting classes as a child, initially alongside her twin brother, as a way to become more comfortable performing despite being naturally shy.

She joined Alexanders Talent Management at age 12 and remained with the agency for more than 20 years, until her death.

== Career ==
Jeffery's first screen role was in the 2006 film Phat Girlz; she played a 10-year-old version of Mo'Nique's character. From 2007 to 2009, she had a recurring role as Keysha Black in HBO's Curb Your Enthusiasm, appearing for two seasons as part of the Black family, who move in with Larry David after Hurricane Katrina in the show's storyline. She also appeared in Nickelodeon's iCarly in 2008, and, according to ABC News, on Disney Channel's Good Luck Charlie in 2011 and Shake It Up the following year, as well as Scream Queens and Crazy Ex-Girlfriend. Other credits cited across sources include Southland and American Vandal.

In 2018, Jeffery was cast as Bree, an aspiring cheerleader and best friend of fellow cheerleader and main character, Addison, in Disney Channel's original film Zombies (2018). She reprised the role in the sequels Zombies 2 (2020) and Zombies 3 (2022), and voiced the character in the 2024 animated series Zombies: The Re-Animated Series.

== Death ==
Jeffery died at her California home on September 1, 2026, at the age of 33. Her death was announced by her talent agency, Alexanders Talent Management, in a statement posted to her Instagram account. No cause of death was disclosed.

Tributes were shared by several of her Zombies co-stars, including Milo Manheim, who called her "the sweetest person I have ever met", and Chandler Kinney, who described her as "the brightest shining light in any room she walked into".

== Filmography ==
=== Film ===
Year	Film	Role	Notes	Ref.
2006	Phat Girlz	Jazmin (age 10)	Minor role	
2014	Teacher of the Year	Vondra	Minor role	
2015	Girl on the Edge	Crystal	Minor role	
2016	Exchange	Brijitte (a.k.a. Brigitte)	Protagonist	
2018	Zombies	Bree	Main role	
2020	Zombies 2	Bree	Main role	
2022	Zombies 3	Bree	Main role	

=== Television ===
Year	Title	Role	Notes	Ref.
2007–2009	Curb Your Enthusiasm	Keysha Black	Recurring character; seasons 6–7	
2008	Miss Guided	Student	Episode "High School Musical"	
2008	iCarly	Girl at Cheesecake Warehouse	Episode "iWin a Date"	
2009	Lie to Me	Student	Episode "Pilot"	
2009	Southland	Janila	Episodes "Unknown Trouble", "Mozambique", "Westside", "Derailed"	
2010	Men of a Certain Age	Fran	Episode "Back in the Sh*t"	
2011	Good Luck Charlie	Jean	Episode "Baby's New Shoes"	
2011	Torchwood	Teenager	Episode "The New World"	
2012–2013	Shake It Up	Margie	Episodes "Spirit It Up", "Stress It Up"	
2013	Super Fun Night	Becky	Episode "Pilot"	
2014	Suburgatory	Shira	Episode "Catch and Release"	
2015	Crazy Ex-Girlfriend	Super Cheery Camp Girl	Episode "Josh Just Happens to Live Here!"	
2016	Best Friends Whenever	Karen	Episode "A Time to Double Date"	
2016	Uncle Buck	Kiana	Episode "I Got This"	
2016	Scream Queens	Frumpy Girl #3	Episode "Halloween Blues"	
2017	American Vandal	Sierra Sherrington	Episodes "Hard Facts: Vandalism and Vulgarity", "A Limp Alibi", "Nailed", "Premature Theories"	
2020	Game On: A Comedy Crossover Event	Young Peaches	Episode "Family Reunion: Remember the Family's Feud?"	
2020	Spider-Man	Mania (voice)	Episode "Maximum Venom"	
2023	Zombies: The Re-Animated Series Shorts	Bree (voice)	Voice role; episode "I Think We're a Clone Now"	
2024–2026	Zombies: The Re-Animated Series	Bree (voice)	Main voice role (Season 2; posthumous release)	

=== Web ===
Year	Title	Role	Notes	Ref.
2025	Spectrum	Herself	Episode "They Were Child Stars Here's What Happened Next"	

== Discography ==
=== Songs ===
Title	Year	Album	Ref.
"Fired Up" (with Zombies cast)	2018	Zombies (Original TV Movie Soundtrack)	
"Flesh and Bone" (with Baby Ariel, Meg Donnelly, Pearce Joza, Chandler Kinney, Milo Manheim and Kylee Russell)	2020	Zombies 2 (Original TV Movie Soundtrack)	
"Flesh and Bone" [Soundtrack Version] (with Milo Manheim, Meg Donnelly, Kylee Russell, Chandler Kinney, Pearce Joza and Baby Ariel)	2020	Zombies 2 (Original TV Movie Soundtrack)	
"One for All" (with Milo Manheim, Meg Donnelly, Kylee Russell, Trevor Tordjman, Chandler Kinney, Pearce Joza and Baby Ariel, Emilia McCarthy, Jasmine Renee Thomas and Noah Zulfikar)	2020	Zombies 2 (Original TV Movie Soundtrack)	
"Brighter With You" (with Zombies cast)	2024	Zombies: The Re-Animated Series (Original Soundtrack)	

=== Singles ===
Title	Year	Album	Ref.
"We Got This" (with Milo Manheim, Meg Donnelly, Kylee Russell, Trevor Tordjman, Carla Jeffery, Emilia McCarthy, Jasmine Renee Thomas, James Godfrey and Noah Zulfikar)	2020	Zombies 2 (Original TV Movie Soundtrack)	
"Flesh & Bone/Someday Mashup" (with Baby Ariel, Meg Donnelly, Pearce Joza, Chandler Kinney, Milo Manheim and Kylee Russell)	2020	Non-album single	
"Flesh & Bone/Come On Out Mashup" (with Pearce Joza, Chandler Kinney, Milo Manheim, Baby Ariel and Kylee Russell)	2022	Non-album single	
