= Diablo (song) =

2014 single by Mac Miller

Single by Mac Miller

from the album Faces
- Released: September 3, 2014
- Genre: Hip hop; jazz rap
- Length: 3:18
- Label: REMember; Warner
- Songwriter(s): Malcolm McCormick; Josh Berg; Duke Ellington; Irving Mills; Manny Curtis
- Producer(s): Larry Fisherman; Berg

Mac Miller singles chronology
"Watching Movies" (2013)	"Diablo" (2014)	"100 Grandkids" (2015)

Music video
- "Diablo" on YouTube

"Diablo" is a song by American rapper Mac Miller. It was first released on February 10, 2014 via SoundCloud, before being officially released on September 3, 2014 as the lead single from his eleventh mixtape Faces (2014). Produced by Miller himself (as Larry Fisherman) and Josh Berg, the song contains a sample of "In a Sentimental Mood" by Duke Ellington.

== Composition and lyrics ==
"Diablo" is a jazz rap song that find Mac Miller rapping about topics such as his superior lyricism over many rappers, disillusionment with fame ("How do the famous function? The A-list can't be trusted / I strong-arm 'em like I play the trumpet"), drug abuse, angst and depressive thoughts, albeit in a laid-back state and including some humor in his lyrics; he also references the incident of Justin Bieber urinating in a bucket and the singer's album Journals.

== Music video ==
The music video was released on September 5, 2014. It sees Mac Miller on a street in Los Angeles, surrounded by a crowd of locals. He wears a bright red jacket and captain's hat, clutches flowers and cupcakes, and raps from the roof of a food truck which the people are gathered around.
