= The Evidence (TV series) =

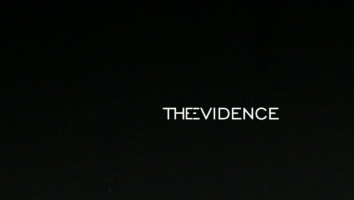
- Genre: Crime drama; Police procedural
- Created by: Sam Baum; Dustin Thomason
- Starring: Orlando Jones; Rob Estes; Anita Briem; Martin Landau
- Country of origin: United States
- Original language: English
- No. of seasons: 1
- No. of episodes: 8

Production
- Executive producers: Sam Baum; Dustin Thomason
- Running time: 60 minutes
- Production companies: John Wells Productions; Warner Bros. Television

Original release
- Network: ABC
- Release: March 22 – July 1, 2006

The Evidence is an American police procedural drama that aired on ABC from March 22 to July 1, 2006. The series starred Orlando Jones, Rob Estes, Anita Briem and Martin Landau.

== Summary ==
The Evidence is a character-driven police procedural revolving around a San Francisco Police Department inspector forlorn over the murder of his wife. His best friend and partner provide some comic relief. Each episode begins with a voice-over and the presentation of the evidence for the episode's particular crime. The evidence is presented as a puzzle piece and invites the viewer to 'play along' in solving the mystery. As the story progresses the characters discover the evidence shown to the viewer at the start of the episode. The inspectors are aided by Dr. Sol Goldman, the medical examiner. The multi-episode story arc involves Inspector Cole investigating the murder of his wife Julia.

The show was created by Sam Baum and Dustin Thomason, who also serve as executive producers, and is a John Wells Production in association with Warner Bros. Television.

The show's pilot episode premiered on Wednesday, March 22, 2006, at 10 p.m. on the ABC television network. Four additional episodes were broadcast before the show was removed from the schedule due to poor ratings. The remaining four episodes were burned off on Saturdays during June and July 2006.

== Cast ==
- Orlando Jones as Inspector Cayman Bishop
- Rob Estes as Inspector Sean Cole
- Anita Briem as Emily Stevens
- Martin Landau as Dr. Sol Goldman

== Episodes ==
No.	Title	Directed by	Written by	Original release date	U.S. viewers (millions)
1	"Pilot"	Gary Fleder	Dustin Thomason, Samuel Baum	March 22, 2006	9.10
Inspectors Bishop and Cole uncover a flowering hydrangea plant, a severed human finger with an attached compass ring, a cellular phone, and a gold locket in an attempt to solve the homicide of a beautiful, young pharmacist. Meanwhile, Cole struggles with the unsolved murder of his wife.
2	"Down for the Count"	Gary Fleder	Gary Glasberg	March 29, 2006	7.71
Inspectors Bishop and Cole investigate the murder of a boxer who is found dead in an alley following a prizefight. Suspicion falls upon his husband when their financial circumstances come to light, but there is also concern that the fight was fixed.
3	"Borrowed Time"	Nelson McCormick	Samuel Baum, Dustin Thomason	April 5, 2006	7.73
While investigating the accidental death of a power plant worker Bishop and Cole learn that he had been concealing his terminal cancer from his wife. In discussing the ethics of secrecy with Cole Dr Goldman shares some painful childhood memories.
4	"Five Little Indians"	Guy Norman Bee	Samuel Baum, Sam Shaw	April 12, 2006	6.42
Bishop and Cole investigate a series of murders when five people from the same drug treatment center are murdered. It is more than a coincidence that they celebrate their sobriety together and are found dead under similar circumstances.
5	"Yi vs. Li"	Nelson McCormick	Dustin Thomason, Samuel Baum	June 10, 2006	4.07
Bishop and Cole look for help outside of the police department in investigating the murder of a Chinese businessman who followed strict Confucian practices.
6	"Wine and Die"	Stephen Cragg	Dustin Thomason, Samuel Baum	June 17, 2006	4.02
Bishop and Cole explore their dating possibilities at work. They also investigate the murder of a man who tried to steal a bottle of wine from a restaurant's wine cellar.
7	"Stringers"	Lesli Linka Glatter	George Mastras	June 24, 2006	N/A
A paramedic is killed in front of her journalist boyfriend during a robbery in progress. Bishop and Cole find a suspect who has a personal vendetta. Cole makes plans in secret for Bishop's upcoming "non-birthday".
8	"And the Envelope Please"	Ernest Dickerson	William N. Fordes	July 1, 2006	3.26
Bishop and Cole's investigation uncovers more than a simple misunderstanding in the brutal murder of a nightclub DJ. While Bishop is helping his brother adjust to life after prison Cole continues to work on his wife's unsolved murder.

== Reception ==
The Evidence has an average score of 40/100 on Metacritic based on 24 reviews from television critics. Nancy deWolf Smith of The Wall Street Journal said that the show "deserves an award for packing the most intrigue into a first episode." deWolf Smith went on to convey her fascination with the characters, both the texture and depth of Inspector Cole due to the murder of his wife and light-hearted banter of Inspector Bishop. In writing of the secondary and guest stars for the pilot deWolf Smith said, "Even the people who make relatively brief appearances leave you wanting to know more about them." Gloria Goodale of The Christian Science Monitor found the "hook" of the show to solve the crime along with the cops doesn't really work. Goodale gave The Evidence a grade of B and said it is "another urban crime procedural peopled with hip, conflicted detectives. Still, good casting and well-paced writing give hope."

Tom Shales of The Washington Post said that there can be vexing decisions about what to watch, citing the then-current top-rated Sunday shows The Sopranos and Desperate Housewives. Shales said that there was no indecision to be found as The Evidence is a "high-stakes heart-pounder" compared to the "lowbrow nap-maker" show Heist, which premiered at the same time. Shales compared the plight of Inspector Cole to that of Richard Kimble, the titular character of the television series The Fugitive.

Alessandra Stanley, television critic for The New York Times, was not as fond of The Evidence. Among the first things she mentions is that with the show being set in San Francisco there are no Asian or gay characters, not even in the background of crowd shots of the first episode. Despite being filmed in San Francisco Stanley found the show to be "no more representative than the 1970s cop show The Streets of San Francisco and might as well be set in Chicago or Kansas City." Stanley described the characters as the "too familiar" tormented guy with his buddy for comic relief.

Tim Goodman of the San Francisco Chronicle began his review by saying that five years ago, in 2001, The Evidence might have seemed compelling. That was before the CSI franchise set a new standard for the police procedural. "You'd better give the audience some kind of complicated anti-hero character study that is at least as good as what CBS is doing and maybe, quite possibly, dares to approach the level of basic cable. The Evidence offers none of that". Goodman compares the character of Inspector Cole to Adrian Monk, the titular character of the cable television series Monk. While both characters' respective wife was murdered the obsessive-compulsive disorder that Adrian Monk suffers from makes for a more interesting character than the forlorn Sean Cole. Goodman concluded his review by stating that ""The Evidence" is overwhelming that you should watch something else."
