= List of Lie to Me episodes =

Lie to Me is an American crime drama television series created by Samuel Baum that premiered on the Fox network on January 21, 2009. The series follows Dr. Cal Lightman (Tim Roth) and his colleagues at The Lightman Group, as they solve crimes using applied psychology by interpreting microexpressions (through the Facial Action Coding System) and body language.

On May 11, 2011, Fox canceled the show after three seasons. During the course of the series, 48 episodes of Lie to Me aired, between January 21, 2009, and January 31, 2011.

== Series overview ==
Season	Episodes	Originally released	
Season	Episodes	First released	Last released
1	13	January 21, 2009	May 13, 2009
2	22	September 28, 2009	September 13, 2010
3	13	October 4, 2010	January 31, 2011

== Episodes ==
=== Season 1 (2009) ===
No. overall	No. in season	Title	Directed by	Written by	Original release date	Prod. code	U.S. viewers (millions)
1	1	"Pilot"	Robert Schwentke	Samuel Baum	January 21, 2009	1APW79	12.37
Dr. Cal Lightman is the world's leading deception expert who studies facial expressions and involuntary body language to discover not only if someone is lying, but why. Lightman and his team of deception experts assist law enforcement and government agencies to expose the truth behind the lies. The son of a family of devout Jehovah's Witnesses is accused of killing his teacher after being caught fleeing the scene of her murder. Meanwhile, the team is hired by the Democratic National Committee to investigate a second case in which the Chairman of the House Ethics Committee is accused of paying for sex.
2	2	"Moral Waiver"	Adam Davidson	Josh Singer	January 28, 2009	1APW01	12.20
When a female soldier accuses her platoon leader of sexual assault, Lightman is brought to Fort Meade to find out if there's any truth to the accusation. The woman is found to be covering for someone else. Lightman tricks the staff sergeant into admitting that he coerced sex with a soldier by threatening to give her the most dangerous assignment. Meanwhile, Foster investigates whether a high-profile basketball recruit accepted bribes to play for a university.
3	3	"A Perfect Score"	Eric Laneuville	Story by : Samuel Baum & Steven Maeda; Teleplay by : Steven Maeda	February 4, 2009	1APW04	12.99
The murder of a teenage girl who is the daughter of a powerful federal judge leads The Lightman Group to a highly competitive college-prep school where getting to the head of the class means everything. Lightman discovers that a fellow student killed her to protect her involvement in an SAT cheating scam. Foster investigates a NASA test pilot accused of intentionally crashing a $250 million aircraft. It is discovered that the pilot's wife, in an effort to "cure" his psychological disconnect from his family, slipped anti-stress drugs into his food, which compromised his piloting skills.
4	4	"Love Always"	Tim Hunter	Story by : Tom Szentgyörgyi & Steven Maeda; Teleplay by : Tom Szentgyörgyi	February 18, 2009	1APW03	11.09
A controversial South Korean ambassador is presumed to be an assassination target at his son's state wedding. The Lightman team is sent to prevent the murder. The son is shot instead and Lightman exposes long-held family secrets and lies in order to identify the killer—the jealous ex-husband of the son's wife who was using the potential threat at the lavish affair as a cover.
5	5	"Unchained"	Lesli Linka Glatter	Josh Singer	March 4, 2009	1APW05	10.20
Lightman and Torres team up to interrogate a notorious and imprisoned gang leader who claims to be rehabilitated. If the gang leader is freed on parole, he might help fight inner-city violence or return to his life of crime. Foster and Loker investigate the death of a firefighter who was killed in the line of duty. He may have been murdered in a hazing prank gone wrong, but it is revealed that he violated a fireman's code by sleeping with the chief's niece.
6	6	"Do No Harm"	John Behring	Jami O'Brien	March 11, 2009	1APW06	11.25
Foster and Lightman investigate a potential abduction of an 11-year-old girl. During the investigation, the audience learns more about Gillian's private issues. Ria and Eli try to find out whether a renowned peace activist is really who she claims to be. However, Eli is attracted to the woman, which interferes with his professional opinion, but eventually relents and is the one who took a confession from her, after he has doubts on her story's credibility.
7	7	"The Best Policy"	Arvin Brown	T.J. Brady & Rasheed Newson	March 18, 2009	1APW07	10.26
An old friend of Lightman asks him to look into a death caused by a new experimental drug. Foster and Loker help the US government negotiate the release of two Americans about to be executed for possession of narcotics, while the US government attempts to hide their secrets from Foster and Loker. Also Lightman begins to take notice into Foster's husband's secrets.
8	8	"Depraved Heart"	Adam Davidson	Dustin Thomason	April 1, 2009	1APW08	9.18
Lightman is obsessed with his investigation of two women who commit suicide—he is assisted by Torres; Foster and Loker try to recover millions of dollars for investors who were scammed. Lightman's secrets begin to surface, while Torres attempts to figure them out. Dr. Foster and Loker disagree during an investigation of a suspected case of SEC fraud.
9	9	"Life Is Priceless"	Clark Johnson	Dustin Thomason	April 8, 2009	1APW02	8.56
While investigating a building collapse, Lightman discovers a massive cover-up. Meanwhile, a billionaire asks the team to determine if his girlfriend loves him for the right reasons and convinces Loker and Torres to take the case by the large sum of money he is offering to the company.
10	10	"The Better Half"	Karen Gaviola	Ilana Bar-Din Giannini & Josh Singer	April 22, 2009	1APW10	7.97
The Lightman Group is hired by Cal's ex-wife, Zoe Landau, to help with an arson case. Torres investigates the drive by shooting of a rapper.
11	11	"Undercover"	Seith Mann	Tom Szentgyörgyi	April 29, 2009	1APW09	7.75
The group investigates a controversial case about a cop who shot a teenager and the threat of a terrorist attack. Meanwhile, the Lightman Group is supposedly "sued" relating to the multi-million dollar scam, but it was actually a test for Torres' loyalty to see if she would reveal what Loker did (Lightman already knew). Loker is made an unpaid intern near the end of the episode by Lightman, instead of being fired as he was expecting.
12	12	"Blinded"	Milan Cheylov	Elizabeth Craft & Sarah Fain	May 6, 2009	1APW11	8.68
An FBI agent, Ben Reynolds, enlists the Lightman Group in the hunt for a serial rapist. Lightman is slightly disadvantaged by the skills of lying demonstrated by an incarcerated serial rapist (played by Daniel Sunjata) whom the suspect is thought to be copycatting. Lightman breaks his cool, as Torres doesn't follow his rules, while Foster is put in jeopardy. The entire team all work on this case, as the clock ticks to find the serial rapist. Ben Reynolds is made part of the Lightman group at the end of the episode.
13	13	"Sacrifice"	Adam Davidson	Josh Singer & Dustin Thomason	May 13, 2009	1APW12	8.46
Domestic terrorist bombings are occurring across the Washington, DC area sending everyone in a panic. FBI Agent Ben Reynolds calls on The Lightman Group to help identify those responsible and prevent more attacks. Lightman finds that the bombs were detonated remotely and that the bombers were set up by someone else. The case takes a personal turn for Torres when Dupree goes missing. Lightman decides to hide the news from Torres so she can remain focused on the big picture. Zoe helps Lightman with the investigation and both are concerned about their daughter's safety.

=== Season 2 (2009–10) ===
No. overall	No. in season	Title	Directed by	Written by	Original release date	Prod. code	U.S. viewers (millions)
14	1	"The Core of It"	Dan Sackheim	Elizabeth Craft & Sarah Fain	September 28, 2009	2APW01	7.73
A young woman approaches Lightman at his book signing, believing she has psychically seen a murder. Lightman finds that the woman has multiple personalities, and he believes that one of her personalities witnessed the murder. Lightman passes on helping Agent Reynolds vet a potential Supreme Court nominee, instead choosing to pursue the case of the multiple-personality woman. The case is passed on to Torres, whom the nominee does not treat with respect due to her age. Torres puts aside her preconceived judgments about the man when she analyzes the facts. Lightman unlocks the woman's original personality, who helps Lightman find the murderer. Zoe informs Lightman that she is taking their daughter, Emily, and moving to Chicago to open a law firm. Lightman buys out her stake in The Lightman Group so that she can start her own practice in town.
15	2	"Truth or Consequences"	Michael Offer	Nick Santora	October 5, 2009	2APW03	8.06
Zoe enlists Lightman to help with her client, 22-year-old star college football player who has been accused of statutory rape with a 16-year-old girl. The case hits home for Lightman, who learns that his daughter Emily was friends with the group of girls who attend these college fraternity parties. Through the course of their investigation, Lightman and Torres determine that Zoe's client was set up by the girl, whose friends leaked the video of the hookup. Lightman figures that the man did not know the girl was underage, noting that his face showed that he knew he shouldn't find underage girls attractive. Meanwhile, Foster and Loker travel to a religious compound to determine whether its claim of IRS exemption is valid. They believe the head of the compound is holding the women against their will. Foster facilitates the escape of one woman and her children and faces the wrath of both Loker and the government. At the end, the girl's father believes the system is protecting the football player and decides that someone has to pay. He shoots the prosecutor who dropped the charges against the football player, with whose death the episode ends.
16	3	"Control Factor"	James Hayman	Sharon Lee Watson	October 12, 2009	2APW04	7.87
While on vacation in Mexico with Emily, Lightman becomes involved in the case of a missing American woman, who is a single mother on vacation with her daughter. Upon investigation, Lightman learns that the mother got herself involved with an illegal fertility broker and the race is on to find her in time. Back home, Foster investigates D.C.-area hospitals with Lightman's rival, Jack Rader. They try to uncover the reason that five people have grown gravely ill after receiving blood transfusions.
17	4	"Honey"	Timothy Busfield	Matt Olmstead	October 19, 2009	2APW02	7.79
Eric Matheson (Garret Dillahunt) is determined to prove that he didn't murder his wife. So he kidnaps Torres at gunpoint, takes her to Lightman's office, and captures the staff. Cal makes a deal with Matheson and the employees are freed while Cal works to prove Matheson's innocence. Foster, Loker, Reynolds, and Torres attempt to solve the case but a freed employee calls the police and Reynolds has second thoughts about not involving the FBI.
18	5	"Grievous Bodily Harm"	Eric Laneuville	Alexander Cary	October 26, 2009	2APW05	6.33
Cal's old friend Terry Marsh (Lennie James) pulls him into a criminal conspiracy after he settles Terry's gambling debts. The criminals abduct both Cal and Terry and try to recruit Cal to be their personal lie detector, forcing him to determine the validity of a client's counterfeit bills. Over the course of the episode, it is revealed that both Terry and Cal got into trouble with the police when they were young, and that Terry volunteered to take all the blame, allowing Cal to continue with his life. The event ends with an FBI raid, and Lightman tells Terry that they're even. Meanwhile, the Lightman Group probes murderous threats against a high school. They determine that the threats were made by student Stacey, but is she actually a victim?
19	6	"Lack of Candor"	Terrence O'Hara	T.J. Brady & Rasheed Newson	November 9, 2009	2APW07	7.41
After a federal witness is killed, Reynolds becomes the lead witness on a case he worked undercover for 2 years. Determined that Reynolds isn't safe with the US Marshals Service, Lightman runs an investigation and finds some disturbing things about Reynolds' undercover work that his handler (Alicia Coppola) didn't report. In the meantime, Loker and Torres work together to find how the lead witness had been found while in protective custody and shot.
20	7	"Black Friday"	Dan Sackheim	Ethan Drogin & Heather Thomason	November 16, 2009	2APW08	7.23
A boy is determined that he isn't who his parents say he is, after a DNA test proves he is not their son. He enlists the help of Lightman and Foster, who go on a hunt to find his real parents. Meanwhile, Torres joins Loker on his search to prove that an electronics store isn't at fault after a stampede on Black Friday and finds that Loker might have taken the case only to get in Lightman's good graces.
21	8	"Secret Santa"	Michael Zinberg	Alexander Cary	November 23, 2009	2APW09	7.16
Cal spends the run-up to Christmas with a U.S. military unit in Afghanistan, where he must determine the true loyalty of an American spy captured as a Taliban insurgent. The safety of two captured Marines depends on the man's veracity...or lack of it.
22	9	"Fold Equity"	Elodie Keene	Sarah Fain & Elizabeth Craft	November 30, 2009	2APW06	7.49
Lightman, Foster and Reynolds travel to Las Vegas to help locate a missing finalist in the World Series of Poker. Lightman uses his skills to read the other competitors' faces to figure out which one knows about the disappearance. They find the body of a poker coach who was banned from Vegas. Lightman and Foster investigate, while Reynolds plays the tables. Foster also tries to keep a leash on Lightman's fascination with all things Vegas. Meanwhile, Loker and Torres analyze Loker's new relationship, and as a result, get closer to each other.
23	10	"Tractor Man"	Vahan Moosekian	Tim Clemente	December 14, 2009	2APW10	6.64
A protesting farmer called Harold Clark parks his tractor, whose trailer he claims is filled with explosives, near the US Treasury building and the Lightman Group offices, demanding to speak to the President. The FBI sets up its command center in the Lightman's office, requiring Lightman to determine if there is actually a bomb in the tractor trailer. He realizes that Clark is not acting alone. As his team races to find the accomplices, Lightman must then work out if Clark is perpetrator or accomplice or victim, while battling the FBI's preference for simply blowing up Clark. Meanwhile, Loker plays babysitter to third-graders stuck in the Lightman Group office.
24	11	"Beat the Devil"	Vahan Moosekian	David Ehrman & Ethan Drogin	June 7, 2010	2APW21	6.06
While giving a lecture to his mentor's graduate students, Lightman meets Martin (Jason Dohring), who mocks Lightman's work and then beats his deception techniques, twice, in front of the class. Since it seems that Martin is aroused by images of torture yet disgusted by images of sexy women, Lightman concludes that he's a psychopath and possibly a murderer, but Lightman's mentor and the university and even Foster wonder if Lightman's just upset that Martin beat his system. As Lightman grows more sure of his hunch, and learns that a girl has gone missing, he begins to stalk Martin and even puts up posters to warn the other girls on campus. Foster fails to see the clues Lightman is sure of, and he gets a little ruffled when she doesn't support his claims. Eventually Lightman sets a trap--only to have Martin, "five steps ahead," kidnap Lightman instead. Meanwhile, Loker and Torres look into a UFO sighting by a science teacher whose job is at stake due to his claims. Loker and Torres follow the trail resulting in an encounter with Air Force Colonel Gorman (Glenn Morshower)
25	12	"Sweet Sixteen"	Dan Sackheim	Alexander Cary	June 14, 2010	2APW15	6.48
After Lightman's former Pentagon colleague is killed in a car bomb, Lightman and Foster are forced to revisit a series of events from their past, including the therapy sessions that brought them together. Parts of Lightman's past including his run-ins with the IRA are revealed.
26	13	"The Whole Truth"	James Whitmore, Jr.	Ethan Drogin	June 21, 2010	2APW11	6.08
Lightman is called upon by a prosecutor to testify as an expert witness in the trial of a beautiful widow accused of murder. The widow is accused of murdering her much older billionaire husband. She is also accused of having an affair with her step-son and stealing from her husband's company. It is a national case that pits Lightman, working for the prosecution, against his ex-wife, who is the defense attorney in the case. Foster, meanwhile, coaches the prosecution witnesses on how to behave on the stand, and how to engage the jury. Loker and Torres discuss her involvement with an older person.
27	14	"React to Contact"	Michael Zinberg	Daniel Voll	June 28, 2010	2APW20	6.20
Lightman helps a traumatized soldier who got back from Iraq and who thinks that someone is trying to kill him. The soldier earned a Silver Star for his actions, but shows shame about receiving the Star rather than pride. Lightman exposes the real truth of what happened during the events that earned the soldier a Silver Star. The captain of the team hid the evidence of friendly fire during action by air bombing the Iraqi village, which traumatized the soldier and caused him severe nightmares which almost led to the death of his son.
28	15	"Teacher and Pupils"	Roxann Dawson	Kevin Townsley & Nick Santora	July 12, 2010	2APW13	5.71
While being shadowed by Clara (the widow from episode 26), Lightman must question an injured officer who can't speak or move after being injured in the line of duty. An investigation reveals that the Chief Police Officer and four other officers were running a dirty rental business in order to make money. This led to the death of a character named Jenkins, as he tried to oppose the dirty business or at least get his own share. The injured officer was able to help Cal identify the four officers, who later threaten Cal by trying to frame Emily for carrying a sufficient amount of cocaine for selling purposes. Cal is able to solve the investigation, resulting in life sentences in prison for the dirty cops. Meanwhile, the Lightman Group faces a financial crisis, but is rescued by an investment from an equity firm of which Clara is the major investor.
29	16	"Delinquent"	Michael Zinberg	Elizabeth Craft & Sarah Fain	July 19, 2010	2APW14	5.66
After a pregnant girl is found murdered in prison, Cal and the Lightman Group team help Torres clear her juvenile delinquent sister of the charge and protect her from the real killer. It turns out that the warden was running a business letting the prisoners out to rob rich peoples' homes for her so that the warden could, eventually, gain $2 million. She then had the pregnant girl, Marly, killed because the girl was threatening to expose the whole system. Cal gets her to confess inside the Lightman Group interrogation room, while having all the convicts standing outside and watching her go down. Foster and the prison psychologist seem to get romantic because at the end of the episode he walks into Foster's office with a bouquet of flowers. Torres' sister Ava takes a good step in her life and reconciles with her sister. Emily passes her driver's license test.
30	17	"Bullet Bump"	James Hayman	T.J. Brady & Rasheed Newson	July 26, 2010	2APW16	5.60
The Lightman Group investigates when a young woman is killed at a political rally in Virginia. As the group investigates it soon becomes clear there was more going on than just murder and one of The Lightman group is forced out after lying to protect one of the suspects, whom they believed to be innocent.
31	18	"Headlock"	Michael Offer	Sharon Lee Watson & Jameal Turner	August 2, 2010	2APW18	5.64
A street fighter is murdered and Lightman is the prime suspect. Things are further complicated when the lead agent on the case turns out to be someone who Lightmans' suspicions on a previous case cause him to suffer career set back. The clock ticks as the Group must find the real killer before Lightman ends up behind bars.
32	19	"Pied Piper"	Paul McCrane	Sharon Lee Watson	August 16, 2010	2APW12	4.96
Zoe and Lightman fear they sent an innocent man to his death when a man they prosecuted 17 years ago is executed. Events begin to unfold as they did before when phone calls taunting the family of the murder victim start the day after the execution, followed by a new abduction. As Lightman works to find the truth, two members of his team contemplate leaving before Lightman's mistake brings them all down.
33	20	"Exposed"	Terrence O'Hara	David Graziano	August 23, 2010	2APW19	5.10
After Foster's boyfriend, Dave Burns, gets abducted, Lightman tries to track him down with the help of Burns's mysterious ex-partner.
34	21	"Darkness and Light"	Lesli Linka Glatter	Matt Olmstead & Heather Thomason	August 30, 2010	2APW17	5.21
The Lightman Group investigates the disappearance of a young woman, which leads them to uncover a criminal element in the adult film business.
35	22	"Black and White"	Daniel Sackheim	Alexander Cary & Kevin Townsley	September 13, 2010	2APW22	4.94
The Lightman Group investigates the murder of a journalist friend of Lightman's who was killed while exposing a corrupt politician -- a case that tests Lightman's relationship with Reynolds and the FBI. Reynolds is shot during a field trip with Cal to a train station. Meanwhile, Emily's newfound interest in sex makes her father uncomfortable.

=== Season 3 (2010–11) ===
No. overall	No. in season	Title	Directed by	Written by	Original release date	Prod. code	U.S. viewers (millions)
36	1	"In the Red"	Daniel Sackheim	Alexander Cary & David Graziano	October 4, 2010	3APW01	5.87
Lightman attempts to stop a man from robbing a bank by helping to plan and execute it. Meanwhile, Foster and Lightman get into an argument over who is in charge of running the company and a new intern is hired to replace Loker after his promotion. Jamie Hector also guest stars in the episode.
37	2	"The Royal We"	Michael Zinberg	David Ehrman	October 11, 2010	3APW02	5.44
During a teen beauty contest Lightman discerns physical abuse of a contestant by one of the organisers. But when he notices the contestant's mimicry and dependence on her controlling mother, he realises that the perpetrator and victim of the physical abuse are actually the other way round.
38	3	"Dirty Loyal"	Michelle MacLaren	Kevin Fox	October 18, 2010	3APW03	5.62
Internal Affairs investigates an incident involving Detective Wallowski (Monique Curnen). Lightman's team realises that Wallowski is covering for her partner Farr's secret bias for a criminal youth named Suarez. But why does her loyalty run so strong? - who is Suarez really?
39	4	"Double Blind"	David Platt	Dailyn Rodriguez	October 25, 2010	3APW05	4.26
The Lightman Group's expertise is called into question when a woman (Tricia Helfer) plays cat-and-mouse with Cal while he's checking for security leaks at an art museum prior to a major exhibition.
40	5	"The Canary's Song"	Seith Mann	Samantha Howard Corbin	November 8, 2010	3APW06	5.23
When a hated foreman is locked in a mine's store room, his attempt to escape sparks an explosion that kills him and a group of miners. Lightman and Loker investigate, while Foster and Torres work with the FBI, revealing that Lightman has a partner in a gambling scheme. [It is revealed that Reynolds survived being shot at the end of season 2, and now has a desk job at the FBI which he is not happy about.
41	6	"Beyond Belief"	Emile Levisetti	Timothy J. Lea	November 15, 2010	3APW07	5.94
When a wealthy woman (Julia Campbell) attempts suicide in the office of the leader of a self-help empire (David Sutcliffe) her daughter hires Lightman to investigate the cult-like leader. As Lightman gets closer to the truth about the self-help guru's past, threats are made against Lightman and his daughter.
42	7	"Veronica"	Michael Nankin	Ethan Drogin	November 22, 2010	3APW04	5.63
Lightman becomes intrigued with a woman suffering from Alzheimer's disease, who is convinced "Charlie" killed her sister. He pieces together her memories to find out the truth.
43	8	"Smoked"	Kate Woods	David Slack	November 29, 2010	3APW08	6.38
Lightman is hired to solve the murder of a woman whose father (John Amos) is on his deathbed.
44	9	"Funhouse"	Daniel Sackheim	Jameal Turner	January 10, 2011	3APW09	5.48
Lightman is asked to investigate if a patient in a mental hospital is being illegally medicated to keep him and his money there. Lightman begins to question his own sanity and ends up as a patient himself.
45	10	"Rebound"	John Polson	David Ehrman & Kevin Fox	January 10, 2011	3APW10	5.43
Lightman is hired by a wealthy woman (Victoria Pratt) to look into her new boyfriend's background. The case intrigues, as does the man's case of cash, and it is revealed that he has several wives...at the same time.
46	11	"Saved"	Michael Offer	Samantha Corbin-Miller & Dailyn Rodriguez	January 17, 2011	3APW11	5.93
Lightman is hired to investigate three high school students responsible for a fatal traffic accident, which takes a turn for the better when he finds the heroic paramedic who was first on the scene.
47	12	"Gone"	Adam Arkin	Timothy J. Lea	January 24, 2011	3APW12	7.67
A baby goes missing, and her mother accuses an unknown person of the kidnapping. When Lightman sees she's hiding something, he digs deeper and discovers a family in need of repair.
48	13	"Killer App"	Vahan Moosekian	David Slack	January 31, 2011	3APW13	7.06
One of Foster's former patients turns up dead shortly after expressing concern that she is being squeezed out by a business partner.
