= Weekend (Mac Miller song) =

Single by Mac Miller featuring Miguel

Single by Mac Miller featuring Miguel

from the album GO:OD AM
- Released: January 12, 2016
- Recorded: 2015
- Genre: Hip hop
- Length: 3:28
- Label: REMember; Warner Bros.
- Songwriters: Malcolm McCormick; Miguel Pimentel; Jamil Chammas; Masamune Kudo; Ryan Vojtesak; Trocon Roberts, Jr.
- Producers: Charlie Handsome; FKi; Digi; ID Labs (add.); Rex Kudo (add.)

Mac Miller singles chronology
"Jabroni" (2015)	"Weekend" (2016)	"C4" (2016)

Miguel singles chronology
"Simple Things (Remix)" (2015)	"Weekend" (2016)	"Waves (Remix)" (2016)

Music video
- "Weekend" on YouTube

"Weekend" is a song by American rapper Mac Miller, released as the second single from his third studio album GO:OD AM (2015) on January 12, 2016. The song features American singer Miguel.

== Composition ==
The song finds Mac Miller rapping about what he does over the weekend, while Miguel sings the chorus, expressing relief at the end of the week.

== Music video ==
The music video begins with Mac Miller walking and rapping in a dark alley alone, before Miguel picks him up in a car. They then cruise around and go to a locale where Miller raps in a jungle setting hanging with body-suit clad and face-covered women.

== Charts ==
Chart (2015–16)	Peak position
US Bubbling Under Hot 100 (Billboard)	25
US Hot R&B/Hip-Hop Songs (Billboard)	46

== Certifications ==
Region	Certification	Certified units/sales
Denmark (IFPI Danmark)	Gold	45,000^{‡}
New Zealand (RMNZ)	3× Platinum	90,000^{‡}
United Kingdom (BPI)	Silver	200,000^{‡}
United States (RIAA)	4× Platinum	4,000,000^{‡}
^{‡} Sales+streaming figures based on certification alone.
