= Faces (mixtape) =

Mixtape by Mac Miller
- Released: May 11, 2014
- Recorded: 2013–2014
- Studio: The Sanctuary (Studio City, California); The Batcave (Bright Lady Studios, Raleigh, North Carolina); Melbourne, Victoria; San Francisco, California
- Genre: Experimental hip-hop; neo-psychedelia; cloud rap; jazz rap; trip hop
- Length: 85:38
- Label: REMember; Warner
- Producer: Larry Fisherman; 9th Wonder; Axel Folie; Big Jerm; DJ Dahi; DrewByrd; Frank Dukes; ID Labs; JoeeBilli; Josh Berg; Rahki; Earl Sweatshirt; Ritz Reynolds; ShodBeats; Thundercat

Mac Miller chronology
Live from Space (2013)	Faces (2014)	GO:OD AM (2015)

Reissue cover

Singles from Faces
- 1. "Diablo" Released: September 3, 2014; 2. "Colors and Shapes" Released: September 15, 2021

Faces is the eleventh mixtape by American rapper Mac Miller. It was independently released for free download on May 11, 2014. The mixtape is the follow-up to Miller's second studio album Watching Movies with the Sound Off (2013), and is considered by many to be his magnum opus for its dark and personal exploration of Miller's struggle with drug addiction and mental illness. On October 15, 2021, Faces was commercially released on streaming platforms and vinyl.

Miller produced most of Faces himself and moved towards creating more psychedelic and jazzy instrumentals for his increasingly dark lyrical themes. Its jazziness is not a departure from Miller's previous work, as it echoes the project he released under the alias Larry Lovestein titled You that was also centered around jazz instrumentals. It continues to build upon and experiment with the psychedelic sounds of Watching Movies with the Sound Off. The mixtape features guest appearances from Rick Ross, Earl Sweatshirt, Schoolboy Q, Mike Jones, Sir Michael Rocks, Vince Staples, Ab-Soul and Dash.

Faces was named "Mixtape of the Week" by Stereogum on May 14, 2014, given a 7.3 rating by Pitchfork, and noted by Billboard on May 11, 2014.

== Background ==
Mac Miller serves as the executive producer under his production pseudonym "Larry Fisherman", serving as the sole producer or co-producer for over half of the songs on the track list. ID Labs handled production for two songs, while Earl Sweatshirt produced the songs "Polo Jeans" and "New Faces v2" under his own production pseudonym, "randomblackdude". Thundercat, DrewByrd, Rahki, THC, Big Jerm and 9th Wonder produced one song each on the mixtape.

Faces includes various spoken word and movie samples interspliced throughout the album. These include Charles Bukowski on "Wedding", Hunter S. Thompson at the beginning of "Funeral", and Bill Murray from the 1979 comedy Meatballs at the beginning of "It Just Doesn't Matter". These samples had been credited as the reason that Faces had not been released on streaming services until 2021 despite high demand. Many of these samples were removed for the official release.

On September 15, 2021, Miller's estate announced that the mixtape would be available on streaming platforms and vinyl for the first time on October 15, 2021. Alongside the announcement, a video for the song "Colors and Shapes", directed by Sam Manson, was released.

When Faces came to streaming platforms on October 22, 2021, it came as an 'updated' version. This new version included a new bonus track, "Yeah - bonus", after what was previously the final track of the tape, "Grand Finale". Grayson Catlett wrote that given the circumstances of Miller's death in 2018, it would be surprising how many times Miller references his own death.

== Critical reception ==
Professional ratings
Review scores
Source	Rating
AllMusic	4/5 stars
HipHopDX	4/5 stars
Pitchfork	7.3/10
PopMatters	7/10

Faces was met with critical acclaim upon release, and noted for its themes and exploration of psychosis, addiction, and mortality.

Faces was rated the eighteenth best rap album of 2014 by Rolling Stone.

== Commercial performance ==
Upon its commercial release in October 2021, Faces debuted at number three on the US Billboard 200, earning 67,000 album-equivalent units during its first week, of which 34,000 were traditional album sales. It was Miller's seventh album to debut in the top ten. Its 32,000 vinyl sales in the first week set a record for an R&B/hip-hop or rap album, since MRC Data began tracking sales in 1991.

== Track listing ==
Credits adapted from the album's liner notes.

Faces track listing
No.	Title	Writer(s)	Producer(s)	Length
1.	"Inside Outside"	Malcolm McCormick; Stephen Bruner; Wilton Felder	Thundercat	1:55
2.	"Here We Go"	McCormick; Andrew Kim; Thom Bell; William Hart	DrewByrd	2:48
3.	"Friends" (featuring Schoolboy Q)	McCormick; Quincy Hanley; Miles Davis	Larry Fisherman	6:38
4.	"Angel Dust"	McCormick; Josh Berg; Thad Jones	Fisherman; Berg	3:43
5.	"Malibu"	McCormick	Fisherman	3:31
6.	"What Do You Do" (featuring Sir Michael Rocks)	McCormick; Antoine Reed	Fisherman	3:50
7.	"It Just Doesn't Matter"	McCormick; Eric Dan; Brent Reynolds; Karl Jenkins	ID Labs; Ritz Reynolds	3:37
8.	"Therapy"	McCormick; Dan; Jeremy Kulousek; Jacques Burvick	ID Labs; Big Jerm	4:10
9.	"Polo Jeans" (featuring Earl Sweatshirt)	McCormick; Thebe Kgositsile	randomblackdude	3:42
10.	"Happy Birthday"	McCormick; Columbus Smith III	Rahki	2:53
11.	"Wedding"	McCormick; Axel Morgan; Joshua Higginbotham	Axel Folie; JoeeBilli	4:10
12.	"Funeral"	McCormick; Dan	Fisherman; ID Labs	3:44
13.	"Diablo"	McCormick; Berg; Duke Ellington; Irving Mills; Manny Kurtz	Fisherman; Berg	3:18
14.	"Ave Maria"	McCormick	Fisherman	2:56
15.	"55"	McCormick; Bruner; Dylan Rectenwald	Fisherman; Thundercat^{[a]}; Dylan Reynolds^{[a]}	0:53
16.	"San Francisco"	McCormick; Raymond Scott; James Henson	Fisherman	2:44
17.	"Colors and Shapes"	McCormick; Bruner	Fisherman; Thundercat	5:31
18.	"Insomniak" (featuring Rick Ross)	McCormick; Dan; Kulousek; William Roberts II; Rashod Odom; Michael Archer; Raphael Saadiq; Alain Goraguer	ID Labs; Big Jerm; ShodBeats	4:06
19.	"Uber" (featuring Mike Jones)	McCormick; Michael Jones	Fisherman	4:31
20.	"Rain" (featuring Vince Staples)	McCormick; Vincent Staples; Patrick Douthit; Jorge Barreiro	9th Wonder	2:34
21.	"Apparition"	McCormick; Berg	Fisherman; Berg	3:28
22.	"Thumbalina"	McCormick; Berg; Adam Horovitz; Adam Yauch; Michael Diamond; Rick Rubin; Howard Scott; Leroy Jordan; Sylvester Allen; Jerry Goldstein; Harold Brown; Morris Dickerson; Charles Miller; Lee Oskar	Fisherman; Berg	3:06
23.	"New Faces v2" (featuring Earl Sweatshirt and Dash)	McCormick; Kgositsile; Darien Dash	randomblackdude	5:31
24.	"Grand Finale"	McCormick	Fisherman	3:36
Total length:				85:38

Re-release edition (bonus track)
No.	Title	Writer(s)	Producer(s)	Length
25.	"Yeah"	McCormick; Dacoury Natche; Adam Feeney	DJ Dahi; Frank Dukes	5:04

Notes

- ^{^[a]} signifies an additional producer
- "Inside Outside" features additional vocals by Josh Berg
- "Here We Go" features additional vocals by Stacey Dash
- "Friends" features additional vocals by Jimmy Murton and Dylan Reynolds
- "Therapy" features additional vocals by Syd and Tay Walker
- "Polo Jeans" features additional vocals by Ab-Soul and Jimmy Murton
- "New Faces v2" features additional vocals by Ab-Soul

Sample credits

- "Inside Outside" contains a sample of "My Lady" written by Wilton Felder, as performed by The Crusaders.
- "Here We Go" contains a sample of "My New Love" written by Thom Bell and William Hart, as performed by The Delfonics.
- "Friends" contains a sample of "The Ghetto Walk" written by Miles Davis.
- "Angel Dust" contains a sample of "A Child is Born" written and performed by Thad Jones.
- "It Just Doesn't Matter" contains a sample of the 1979 film Meatballs, spoken by Bill Murray.
- "Therapy" contains a sample of "Yesterday (Was So Nice Today)" written by Jacques Burvick, as performed by Aquarian Dream.
- "Diablo" contains an interpolation of "In a Sentimental Mood" written by Duke Ellington, Irving Mills and Manny Kurtz.
- "San Francisco" contains a sample of "Limbo: The Organized Mind" written by Raymond Scott and James Henson.
- "Colors and Shapes" contains a sample from the 1966 documentary How to Go Out of Your Mind: The LSD Crisis, spoken by Timothy Leary.
- "Insomniak" contains samples of "Untitled (How Does It Feel)" written by D'Angelo and Raphael Saadiq, as performed by D'Angelo, and "Ten Et Tiwa Dorment" written and performed by Alain Goraguer.
- "Rain" contains a sample of "Govinda" written by Jorge Barreiro.
- "Thumbalina" contains a sample of "Slow Ride" written by Adam Horovitz, Adam Yauch, Michael Diamond, Rick Rubin, Howard Scott, Leroy Jordan, Sylvester Allen, Jerry Goldstein, Harold Brown, Morris Dickerson, Charles Miller and Lee Oskar, as performed by Beastie Boys.

== Personnel ==
Credits adapted from the album's liner notes.

- Mac Miller – lead vocals (tracks 1–14, 16–25), recording (tracks 3, 5–6, 8, 13–15, 18, 21; as Larry Fisherman)
- Josh Berg – recording (tracks 1–4, 7, 9–12, 17–20, 22–25)
- Ali Shaheed Muhammad – piano (track 6)
- Rahki – drum programming, organ, piano, synths, rhodes (track 10)
- Chris Smith – bass (track 10)
- Corey Fonville – drums (track 10)
- Stuart Bogie – saxophone (track 13)
- Thundercat – bass (tracks 14, 23)
- Ryan Baldon – recording (track 16)
- 9th Wonder – recording (track 20)
- Eric Dan – mixing (all tracks)
- Mike Bozzi – mastering (all tracks)

== Charts ==
=== Weekly charts ===
Weekly chart performance for Faces
Chart (2021)	Peak position
Australian Albums (ARIA)	16
Austrian Albums (Ö3 Austria)	47
Belgian Albums (Ultratop Flanders)	33
Belgian Albums (Ultratop Wallonia)	105
Canadian Albums (Billboard)	5
Dutch Albums (Album Top 100)	17
French Albums (SNEP)	145
German Albums (Offizielle Top 100)	30
Hungarian Albums (MAHASZ)	18
Irish Albums (IRMA)	84
Lithuanian Albums (AGATA)	40
New Zealand Albums (RMNZ)	17
Norwegian Albums (VG-lista)	30
Scottish Albums (OCC)	36
Swiss Albums (Schweizer Hitparade)	34
UK Albums (OCC)	66
UK R&B Albums (OCC)	2
US Billboard 200	3
US Top R&B/Hip-Hop Albums (Billboard)	3

=== Year-end charts ===
Year-end chart performance for Faces
Chart (2021)	Position
US Top R&B/Hip-Hop Albums (Billboard)	88
