= Zombies 2 (soundtrack) =

2020 soundtrack albums

Soundtrack album / cast recording by the original cast of Zombies
- Released: February 14, 2020
- Recorded: 2019–2020
- Genres: Pop; hip hop; ballad
- Length: 26:41
- Label: Walt Disney

The original cast of Zombies chronology
Zombies (2018)	Zombies 2 (2020)	Zombies 3 (2022)

Singles from Zombies 2 (Original TV Movie Soundtrack)
- 1. "We Got This" Released: January 3, 2020; 2. "New Kid in Town" Released: January 24, 2020

Zombies 2 (Original TV Movie Soundtrack) (Note: also marketed as ZOMBIES 2 (Original TV Movie Soundtrack)) is the soundtrack to the Disney Channel Original Movie Zombies 2, a sequel to Zombies (2018) and the second installment in the eponymous musical franchise. Released in conjunction with the film's linear television premiere on February 14, 2020, the album featured original songs performed by the cast involving Milo Manheim, Meg Donnelly, Kylee Russell, Trevor Tordjman, Carla Jeffery, Emilia McCarthy, Jasmine Renee Thomas, Noah Zulfikar, Baby Ariel and several others as the featuring artists.

== Promotion and release ==
On January 3, 2020, the first song "We Got This" performed by Manheim, Donnelly and the cast was released as a single with an accompanying music video released in conjunction on the official Vevo service of Disney Music Group. The second single "New Kid in Town" performed by Ariel was released on January 24, along with a music video. The film's soundtrack was released digitally on February 14, 2020 through Walt Disney Records.

On April 3, 2020, a mashup of "We Own the Night" and "Night Falls" from Descendants 3 soundtrack was released as a single. On April 24, another mashup of "Someday" and "Flesh & Bone" was released.

== Commercial performance ==
The soundtrack of Zombies 2 along with its predecessor has garnered a combined 192.8 million on-demand audio streams and sold nearly 277,000 equivalent album units. The song "Flesh & Bone" garnered over 20.3 million audio streams.

== Track listing ==
No.	Title	Writer(s)	Producer(s)	Length
1.	"We Got This" (Milo Manheim, Meg Donnelly, Kylee Russell, Trevor Tordjman, Carla Jeffery, Emilia McCarthy, Jasmine Renee Thomas, James Godfrey and Noah Zulfikar)	Chantry Johnson; Michelle Zarlenga; Mitch Allan	Allan; Johnson	3:12
2.	"We Own the Night" (Chandler Kinney, Pearce Joza and Baby Ariel)	Antonina Armato; Adam Schmalholz; Thomas Armato; Tim James Price	Rock Mafia	2:30
3.	"Like the Zombies Do" (Milo Manheim, Kylee Russell, Chandler Kinney and Pearce Joza)	Antonina; Schmalholz; Thomas; James	Rock Mafia	2:03
4.	"Gotta Find Where I Belong" (Milo Manheim and Meg Donnelly)	Josh Cumbee; Jordan Powers	Cumbee	2:44
5.	"Call to the Wild" (Meg Donnelly, Chandler Kinney and Pearce Joza)	Antonina; Schmalholz; Thomas; James	Rock Mafia	2:36
6.	"I'm Winning" (Milo Manheim, Kylee Russell, Trevor Tordjman, Emilia McCarthy, Jasmine Renee Thomas and Noah Zulfikar)	Ali Dee Theodore; Anthony Mirabella; Doug Davis; James K. Petrie; Jodie Shihadeh; Ricardo Belfort; Sarai Howard; Susan Paroff	Theodore; Mirabella; Davis	2:49
7.	"Flesh & Bone" (Milo Manheim, Meg Donnelly, Kylee Russell, Carla Jeffery, Chandler Kinney, Pearce Joza and Baby Ariel)	Doug Rockwell; Tova Litvin	Rockwell	3:33
8.	"One for All" (Milo Manheim, Meg Donnelly, Kylee Russell, Trevor Tordjman, Carla Jeffery, Chandler Kinney, Pearce Joza and Baby Ariel, Emilia McCarthy, Jasmine Renee Thomas and Noah Zulfikar)	Antonina; Schmalholz; Thomas; James	Rock Mafia	2:52
9.	"Someday (Reprise)" (Milo Manheim and Meg Donnelly)	Dustin Burnett; Paula Winger	Burnett; Winger	1:13
10.	"The New Kid in Town" (Baby Ariel)	Hanna Jones; Jack Kugell; Matt Wong; Paulina Cerrilla	Jones; Kugell; Wong	3:09
Total length:				26:41

== Score album ==
Music from Zombies (Original Score)

Film score by George S. Clinton and Amit May Cohen
- Released: November 20, 2020
- Recorded: 2019–2020
- Genre: Film score
- Length: 19:56
- Label: Walt Disney
- Producers: George S. Clinton; Amit May Cohen

George S. Clinton chronology
Zombies (2016)	Zombies 2 (2018)	Zombies 3 (2020)

Amit May Cohen chronology
Hanger's Limb (2016)	Zombies 2 (2018)	Shtetlers (2020)

Music from Zombies (Original Score) is the score album that featured the incidental music underscored by George S. Clinton and Amit May Cohen for the film and its predecessor. The album was released on November 20, 2020 through Walt Disney Records. Tracks 8–16 features the music from Zombies 2.

=== Track listing ===
No.	Title	Length
1.	"Intro"	1:29
2.	"I Love Bree/Bus Ride from Camp"	1:52
3.	"In the Woods"	1:12
4.	"Werewolves Are Real/City Council"	1:23
5.	"Anti-Monster Laws/Wolves Gather"	3:05
6.	"Playing Nice/Meet the Wolves/Prawn Night"	2:38
7.	"Addison Needs Help/Wolf Den/Fully Charged Moonstone"	2:30
8.	"Evacuate/Ready"	1:49
9.	"Moonstone Quake/The Kiss/Amiterite"	3:58
Total length:		19:56

== Chart performance ==
=== Weekly charts ===
Chart (2018–2022)	Peak position
UK Album Downloads (OCC)	61
UK Soundtrack Albums (OCC)	11
US Billboard 200	44
US Kid Albums (Billboard)	2
US Top Current Album Sales (Billboard)	14
US Top Soundtracks (Billboard)	2

=== Year-end charts ===
Chart (2018)	Position
US Kid Albums (Billboard)	6
