= Nikki & Rich =

- Origin: Corona, California; Queens, New York, United States
- Genres: Urban, R&B, club/dance
- Years active: 2008-2015
- Labels: Reprise Records (2008-2011); Born Rich Inc (2011-2015)
- Members: Nikki Leonti; Rich Velonskis

Nikki & Rich was an R&B group, made up of Nikki Leonti & Rich Velonskis.

== Career ==
Rich was looking for a vocalist and lyricist to collaborate with and he found Nikki. The two began working together in December 2008, writing and recording up in Rich's Hollywood Hills home studio. Nikki & Rich signed with Reprise Records in 2009 and set work on a debut album titled Everything. Following their departure from the label, the duo released an EP titled Finally Free on their official site for their fans on March 8, 2011. Additionally, they contributed a cover of the 1980s hit "Mr. Big Stuff" for the feature film Hop. They continued to tour throughout the year, with the release of their debut album (now titled Greatest Hits...) on digital services on September 27, 2011.

In 2015, Nikki & Rich announced their disbanding.

== Discography ==
=== Albums ===
Year	Title	Chart peak positions		Sales and certifications
Year	Title	U.S.	U.S R&B	Sales and certifications
2011	Greatest Hits: Released: September 27, 2011; Label: Born Rich Inc	–	–	Worldwide sales: U.S. sales: RIAA certification:

=== EPs ===
- Next Best Thing (2010)
- Finally Free (2011)

=== Singles ===
- "Cat & Mouse" (2009)
- "Dreaming" (from Just Wright soundtrack) (2010)
- "City Lights" (featuring Fabolous) (2011)
- "Rainbow" (2011)
- "Danger" (featuring Hayes) (2011)
- "Same Kind of Man" (2011)
