= Zombies 3 (soundtrack) =

Soundtrack album by Zombies cast
- Released: July 15, 2022
- Recorded: 2021
- Genre: Pop
- Length: 26:57
- Label: Walt Disney

Zombies soundtracks chronology
Zombies 2 (2020)	Zombies 3 (2022)	Zombies 4: Dawn of the Vampires (2025)

Singles from Zombies 3
- 1. "Alien Invasion" Released: July 1, 2022

Zombies 3 is a soundtrack album by the film's cast of the same name, released by Walt Disney Records on July 15, 2022. The soundtrack was announced on May 20, 2022. The lead single, "Alien Invasion," was released on July 1, 2022.

== Background ==
The soundtrack was released on July 15, 2022, to coincide with the release of its parent film. The soundtrack consists of 11 songs, 10 of which originated from the film. It also includes new renditions of "Someday" and "Fired Up" from the previous films.

== Singles ==
"Alien Invasion", performed by the cast of Zombies 3, was released as a single on July 1, 2022. Another single, "What Is This Feeling," performed by the cast of Zombies 3, was released on August 12, 2022, separate from the soundtrack.

== Track listing ==
No.	Title	Writer(s)	Performer(s)	Length
1.	"Alien Invasion"	Antonina Armato; Thomas Sturges; IN-Q; Tim James	Cast of Zombies 3	4:00
2.	"Ain't No Doubt About It"	Josh Cumbee; Jordan Powers	Milo Manheim; Meg Donnelly	2:50
3.	"Come on Out"	Dennis Baffoe; Tim Boomsma; Gustavo Branger; Sophia Ayana; Avalan; Galeyn Tenhaeff; Mohamed Alitou; Maruja Retana; Candace Sosa	Chandler Kinney; Ariel Martin; Pearce Joza	2:45
4.	"Exceptional Zed"	Mitch Allan; Chantry Johnson; Michelle Zarlenga	Cast of Zombies 3	2:31
5.	"Exceptional Zed" (Reprise)	Allan; Johnson; Zarlenga	Manheim	0:43
6.	"I'm Finally Me"	Kari Kimmel; Cas Weinbren	Donnelly	3:25
7.	"Someday"	Paula Winger; Dustin Burnett	Cast of Zombies 3	1:35
8.	"Nothing But Love"	Chen Neeman	Cast of Zombies 3	3:02
9.	"Utopia"	Cas Weinbren	Matt Cornett; Terry Hu; Kyra Tantao	2:05
10.	"Fired Up"	Allan; Nikki Leonti	Cast of Zombies 3	0:49
11.	"ZOMBIES 3 Score Medley"	George S. Clinton; Amit May Cohen	George S. Clinton; Amit May Cohen	3:06

== Charts ==
Chart performance for Zombies 3 (Original Soundtrack)
Chart (2022)	Peak position
UK Album Downloads (OCC)	58
UK Soundtrack Albums (OCC)	27
US Billboard 200	79
US Kid Albums (Billboard)	1
US Top Soundtracks (Billboard)	3
