= 100 Grandkids =

Single by Mac Miller

from the album GO:OD AM
- Released: August 7, 2015
- Recorded: 2015
- Studio: Mac's Crib (Los Angeles); ID Labs (Pittsburgh)
- Genre: Hip hop
- Length: 4:38
- Label: REMember; Warner Bros.
- Songwriter(s): Malcolm McCormick; Michael Clervoix; Jeremy Kulousek; Eric Dan; Zach Vaughan; Dorsey Wesley; Drayton Goss; Jamel Fisher; Mark Curry; Robert Ross; Gato Barbieri; Dory Previn
- Producer(s): Sha Money XL; ID Labs; Josh Berg (add.)

Mac Miller singles chronology
"Diablo" (2014)	"100 Grandkids" (2015)	"Break the Law" (2015)

Music video
- "100 Grandkids" on YouTube

"100 Grandkids" is a song recorded by American rapper Mac Miller for his third studio album GO:OD AM (2015). It was released on August 7, 2015, by Warner Bros. Records as the lead single from Miller's major label debut album. The song is divided into two parts: "Grandkids", produced by Sha Money XL, and "100 Grand" produced by ID Labs.

== Background ==
Miller premiered "100 Grandkids" at the Grassroots Music Festival in Council Bluffs, Iowa, on July 31, 2015. The song was officially released by Warner Bros. Records as the lead single from his third studio album and major label debut GO:OD AM on August 7, 2015.

"100 Grandkids" is a two-part song, split between "Grandkids"—promising to give his mother grandkids—and "100 Grand"—recalling when he "first made a hundred grand". The first part was produced by Sha Money XL, and the second by ID Labs. Miller described the two parts as "thinking about your future" and "thinking about yourself", respectively. The song samples P. Diddy, Black Rob and Mark Curry's "Bad Boy for Life" and Norman Connors' "Last Tango in Paris".

== Music video ==
The music video was released on the same day as the official audio. Directed by Nick Walker, the video is split into two parts like the song, beginning with Miller rapping as the moon in a play performed by children dressed in costumes. It transitions to Miller rapping in an empty parking lot beside a car bouncing with hydraulics.

== Track listing ==
- Digital download
1. "100 Grandkids" – 4:38
- Digital download – Radio Edit
1. "100 Grandkids (Short Radio Edit)" – 3:58

== Personnel ==
- Malcolm McCormick – lead vocals (as Mac Miller), songwriting
- Elle Varner – additional background vocals
- Michael Clervoix – production (as Sha Money XL), songwriting
- Eric Dan – production (as ID Labs), songwriting, mixing
- Jeremy Kulousek – production (as ID Labs), songwriting, recorded by
- Zach Vaughan – production (as ID Labs), songwriting
- Josh Berg – additional production, recorded by
- Dorsey Wesley – songwriting
- Drayton Goss – songwriting
- Mark Curry – songwriting
- Robert Ross – songwriting
- Jamel Fisher – songwriting
- Gato Barbieri – songwriting
- Dory Previn – songwriting
- Jaslyn Taylee-Edgar – choir
- Jordan Dame – choir
- Nikki Leonti – choir
- Ryan Edgar – choir
- Christian Wunderlich – guitar
- Ben Adamson – organ, trumpet
- Chris Athens – mastering
- Dave Huffman – mastering

Credits adapted from Tidal and ASCAP.

== Charts ==
Chart (2015)	Peak position
US Billboard Hot 100	100
US Hot R&B/Hip-Hop Songs (Billboard)	28

== Certifications ==
Region	Certification	Certified units/sales
United States (RIAA)	Platinum	1,000,000^{‡}
^{‡} Sales+streaming figures based on certification alone.
