= GO:OD AM =

Studio album by Mac Miller
- Released: September 18, 2015
- Studios: Ameraycan; Mac's Crib; Paramount (Los Angeles); ID Labs (Pittsburgh); The Sanctuary (Studio City)
- Genre: Hip-hop
- Length: 70:28
- Labels: REMember; Warner Bros.
- Producers: Badboxes; Christian Rich; Charlie Handsome; Digi; DJ Dahi; DrewByrd; FKi; Frank Dukes; ID Labs; Sap; Sevn Thomas; Sha Money XL; Sledgren; Sounwave; Tyler, the Creator; Vinylz

Mac Miller chronology
Faces (2014)	GO:OD AM (2015)	The Divine Feminine (2016)

Singles from GO:OD AM
- 1. "100 Grandkids" Released: August 7, 2015; 2. "Weekend" Released: January 11, 2016

GO:OD AM is the third studio album by American rapper Mac Miller. It was released on September 18, 2015, by REMember Music and Warner Bros. Records. The album features guest appearances from Ab-Soul, Chief Keef, Lil B, Miguel, and Little Dragon.

GO:OD AM was supported by two singles: "100 Grandkids" and "Weekend". Miller began his international tour in support of the album on September 20, 2015, which started at his hometown of Pittsburgh, Pennsylvania. The album received generally positive reviews from critics, and debuted at number four on the US Billboard 200.

== Background ==
On January 14, 2014, Miller announced that he was parting ways with Rostrum Records. On May 11, 2014, Miller released his eleventh mixtape Faces. On October 21, 2014, news surfaced that Miller signed a recording contract with Warner Bros. Records, including a distribution deal for his label REMember Music. On July 30, 2015, Miller announced that he had completed his third studio album. On August 5, 2015, he revealed the album title, release date, as well as a music video for the lead single "100 Grandkids".

== Release and promotion ==
On September 4, 2015, Miller released a mobile app that functions as an alarm and plays snippets of new music leading up to the album's release. Fans can also purchase a Breakfast Special Edition of the LP, packaging in a cereal box complete with cereal, a plastic cereal bowl, and a surprise item in addition to the CD and digital download. In the days leading up to the album's release, Miller hosted a series of free social events to promote the album, deemed Homecoming Weekend. The festival culminated with the album release show and subsequent international tour. Miller toured internationally in support of the album on The GO:OD AM Tour, and it started at his hometown of Pittsburgh, Pennsylvania.

A 10th anniversary edition of the album, featuring 3 additional songs, was released on October 3, 2025.

=== Singles ===
The album's first single, "100 Grandkids", was released on August 7, 2015. On August 7, 2015, the music video was released for "100 Grandkids". The album's second official single, "Weekend" featuring Miguel, was released January 11, 2016.

=== Promotional singles ===
The album's first promotional single, "Break the Law", was released on August 17, 2015. The album's second promotional single, "Clubhouse", was released on September 10, 2015.

== Critical reception ==
Professional ratings
Aggregate scores
Source	Rating
AnyDecentMusic?	6.7/10
Metacritic	71/100
Review scores
Source	Rating
AllMusic	4/5 stars
Billboard	4/5 stars
Consequence	B
Exclaim!	7/10
The Guardian	3/5 stars
HipHopDX	4.0/5
Pitchfork	7.3/10
PopMatters	7/10
RapReviews	5/10
Rolling Stone	2/5 stars

GO:OD AM was met with generally positive reviews. At Metacritic, which assigns a normalized rating out of 100 to reviews from professional publications, the album received an average score of 71, based on 14 reviews. Aggregator AnyDecentMusic? gave it 6.7 out of 10, based on their assessment of the critical consensus.

David Jeffries of AllMusic said, "Getting sober and ridding himself of depression are topics that GO:OD AM touches upon, but rather than his past, the 'show and prove' Miller is driven by his rebirth on an interesting and infectious LP that's also his strongest to date". Meghan Garvey of Billboard said, "On major-label debut GO:OD AM, his third and best studio album, Miller grapples frankly with fame, addiction, recovery and the struggle to be a decent person over taut, melancholy production that channels both bleary inebriation and hard-fought optimism". Andrew Gretchko of HipHopDX said, "If Miller's second album was a stepping stone that allowed him to climb above his partying past, GO:OD AM serves as a wakeup call for those that think his music is still best suited for frat parties. With a bright future ahead of him, Miller has positioned himself for career longevity, so long as he can keep his demons behind him". Chris Dart of Exclaim! stated, "If there's one flaw with this album, it's its length. If you make a 70-minute album, all 70 of those minutes better be phenomenal, and that's not the case here. Dropping two or three songs would be enough to turn this very good record into a brilliant one". Brian Duricy of PopMatters said, "Relying on his individuality yields his greatest results, but the album's most passable moments too". Tayler Montague of Pitchfork said, "We might not learn a lot of specifics about him, but there's a lot of honesty in his music if you look for it".

C. J. Rucker of The Source said, "GO:OD AM is the most transparent music Mac Miller has ever made and in doing so he has created a sonically cohesive and impressive album". Michael Madden of Consequence said, "Beyond rapping, producing, and singing, Mac must see himself as a total package, and at 70 minutes long, GO:OD AM was always bound to have a lot of elements clashing for space. Somehow, it still feels balanced. It's essentially an offbeat stoner rap album, but there's still plenty of melody, in Mac's own singing and the guest appearances from the likes of Miguel on "Weekend" and Nagano on "The Festival", as well as in the EDM of "Jump" at the end of the album". Lanre Bakare of The Guardian said, "It's musically adventurous in a way that recalls Chance the Rapper's Surf project, but takes fewer detours into psych and jazz". Michael G. Barilleaux of RapReviews said, "At the end of the day Mac Miller is without a doubt capable of bringing more to the table than shallow, boring rap. Unfortunately, he doesn't do much to prove that on GO:OD AM". Christopher R. Weingarten of Rolling Stone said, "GO:OD A.M. is a 70-minute studio album that would have been better served as two mixtape diary entries until the sober Miller discovered a smarter way to channel his newfound enthusiasm".

== Commercial performance ==
In the United States, GO:OD AM debuted at number four on the Billboard 200, selling 73,000 copies in its first week. It was the third highest selling album in the United States during its debut week. As of October 2015, the album has sold 92,000 copies domestically. GO:OD AM earned 14,000 album-equivalent units in the week following Mac Miller's death on September 7, 2018, thus allowing the album to re-enter the Billboard 200 at number 32. On December 11, 2024, the album was certified platinum by the Recording Industry Association of America (RIAA) for combined sales and streams in excess of 1,000,000 units in the United States.

== Track listing ==
GO:OD AM track listing
No.	Title	Writer(s)	Producer(s)	Length
1.	"Doors"	Malcolm McCormick; Tyler Okonma	Tyler, the Creator	1:18
2.	"Brand Name"	McCormick; Eric Dan; Jeremy Kulousek; Zachary Vaughan; Stephen Bruner	ID Labs	5:02
3.	"Rush Hour"	McCormick; Dan; Kulousek; Vaughan	ID Labs	3:21
4.	"Two Matches" (featuring Ab-Soul)	McCormick; Herbert Stevens IV; Mark Spears; Axel Morgan; Ricci Riera; Andris Mattson; Amber Navaran; Max Bryk	Sounwave; Axlfoile^{[a]}; Riera^{[a]}	4:36
5.	"100 Grandkids"	McCormick; Dan; Kulousek; Vaughan; Michael Clervoix; Dorsey Wesley; Dory Previn; Drayton Goss; Gato Barbieri; Jamel Fisher; Mark Curry; Robert Ross	ID Labs; Sha Money XL; Josh Berg^{[b]}	4:38
6.	"Time Flies" (featuring Lil B)	McCormick; Kehinde Hassan; Taiwo Hassan	Christian Rich	2:53
7.	"Weekend" (featuring Miguel)	McCormick; Miguel Pimentel; Jamil Chammas; Masamune Kudo; Ryan Vojtesak; Trocon Roberts, Jr.	Charlie Handsome; FKi; Digi; ID Labs^{[b]}; Rex Kudo^{[b]}	3:28
8.	"Clubhouse"	McCormick; Riera; Adam Feeney	Riera; ID Labs^{[b]}	3:00
9.	"In the Bag"	McCormick; Brett Bouldin; Bernice Williams; Eugene Dixon; Earl Edwards; Louis Freeze; Larry Muggerud; Rupert Thomas, Jr.	Sevn Thomas; ID Labs^{[b]}	4:35
10.	"Break the Law"	McCormick; Bruner; George Forrest; Robert Wright	DrewByrd	3:15
11.	"Perfect Circle / God Speed"	McCormick; Feeney	Frank Dukes	7:55
12.	"When in Rome"	McCormick; Dan; Kulousek; Vaughan; Edward Murray	ID Labs; Sledgren	3:43
13.	"ROS"	McCormick; Dacoury Natche; Feeney; Gabrielle Varner; Thomas Paxton-Beesley	DJ Dahi	5:43
14.	"Cut the Check" (featuring Chief Keef)	McCormick; Keith Cozart; Anderson Hernandez	Vinylz	2:50
15.	"Ascension"	McCormick; Dan; Kulousek; Vaughan; Curtis Mayfield	ID Labs	4:52
16.	"Jump"	McCormick; Natche; Dan; Kulousek; Vaughan; Jonathan King; Harrison Wargo	Badboxes; DJ Dahi; ID Labs; Sap	4:39
17.	"The Festival" (featuring Little Dragon)	McCormick; Dan; Kulousek; Vaughan; Bouldin; Fredrik Wallin; Håkan Wirenstrand; Yukimi Nagano	ID Labs; Little Dragon^{[a]}	4:38
Total length:				70:26

GO:OD AM (10th Anniversary) track listing
No.	Title	Writer(s)	Producer(s)	Length
18.	"Royal Flush" (featuring Vinny Radio)	McCormick; Dan; Kulousek; Leon "Vinny Radio" Moore; Jay Card; Andrew "Dru Tang" Klein	ID Labs; Dru Tang	3:32
19.	"Cable Box"	McCormick; Dan	ID Labs	4:43
20.	"Carpe Diem"	McCormick; Michael Volpe	Clams Casino	3:45

Notes

- ^{^[a]} signifies a co-producer
- ^{^[b]} signifies an additional producer
- "Doors", "Brand Name", "100 Grandkids" and "ROS" feature additional vocals by Elle Varner
- "Clubhouse" and "Perfect Circle / God Speed" feature additional vocals by Ab-Soul
- "In the Bag" features additional vocals by Domo Genesis, Juicy J and Schoolboy Q
- "Break the Law" features additional vocals by Juicy J
- "Perfect Circle / God Speed" feature uncredited vocals by Frank Dukes

Sample credits

- "Two Matches" contains elements from "What Shall We Do", written by Andris Mattson, Amber Navaran, and Max Bryk, as performed by Moonchild.
- "100 Grandkids" contains interpolations from "Bad Boy for Life", written by Dorsey Wesley, Drayton Goss, Jamel Fisher, Mark Curry, and Robert Ross, as performed by P. Diddy, Black Rob, and Mark Curry.
- "ROS" contains samples from "West", written by Adam Feeney and Thomas Paxton-Beesley, as performed by River Tiber.
- "Ascension" contains elements from "Never Say You Can't Survive", written and performed by Curtis Mayfield.

== Personnel ==
Credits adapted from the album's liner notes.

Musicians

- Thundercat – bass (tracks 2, 10)
- Stuart Bogie – saxophone (tracks 2, 16)
- Christian Wunderlich – guitar (tracks 3, 5–7, 11)
- Nice Rec – scratching (tracks 3, 8)
- Ben Adamson – synthesizer (track 3), organ (track 5), trumpet (tracks 5, 7), flugelhorn (track 6)
- Robert Wooten III – bass (track 4)
- Jake Troth – guitar (track 4)
- Will Miller – trumpet (track 4)
- Jaslyn Taylee-Edgar – choir (tracks 5, 11)
- Jordan Dame – choir (tracks 5, 11)
- Nikki Leonti – choir (tracks 5, 11)
- Ryan Edgar – choir (tracks 5, 11)
- Alexander Sowinski – drums (track 11; uncredited)
- Chester Hansen – bass guitar, piano (track 11; uncredited)
- Taylor Graves – piano (track 13)

Technical

- Vic Wainstein – recording (tracks 1, 7)
- Big Jerm – recording (tracks 2, 5, 12, 15)
- Andrew Klein – recording (track 3)
- Josh Berg – recording (tracks 4, 5, 7–14, 16)
- Larry Fisherman – recording (track 6)
- E. Dan – mixing (all tracks), recording (tracks 4, 17)
- Chris Athens – mastering (all tracks)
- Dave Huffman – mastering (all tracks)

== Charts ==
=== Weekly charts ===
Chart performance for GO:OD AM
Chart (2015)	Peak position
Australian Albums (ARIA)	32
Belgian Albums (Ultratop Flanders)	74
Belgian Albums (Ultratop Wallonia)	102
Canadian Albums (Billboard)	7
Dutch Albums (Album Top 100)	86
French Albums (SNEP)	117
New Zealand Albums (RMNZ)	29
Swiss Albums (Schweizer Hitparade)	55
UK Albums (Official Charts)	76
US Billboard 200	4
US Top R&B/Hip-Hop Albums (Billboard)	2

2025 chart performance for GO:OD AM
Chart (2025)	Peak position
Croatian International Albums (HDU)	12

=== Year-end charts ===
2015 year-end chart performance for GO:OD AM
Chart (2015)	Position
US Billboard 200	200
US Top R&B/Hip-Hop Albums (Billboard)	42

2016 year-end chart performance for GO:OD AM
Chart (2016)	Position
US Top R&B/Hip-Hop Albums (Billboard)	76

== Certifications ==
Certifications for GO:OD AM
Region	Certification	Certified units/sales
United States (RIAA)	Platinum	1,000,000^{‡}
^{‡} Sales+streaming figures based on certification alone.

== Release history ==
Release dates and formats for GO:OD AM
Region	Date	Label(s)	Format(s)	Edition	Ref.
United States	September 18, 2015	REMember Music; Warner Bros.	CD; digital download	Standard	
