= Samuel Baum =

American actor, playwright, screenwriter and producer

Samuel Baum is an American actor, playwright, screenwriter and producer. He served as the creator and executive producer of the Fox series Lie to Me (2009–2011). He is also one of the co-creators of the ABC series The Evidence (2006). He also co-wrote the 2017 HBO film The Wizard of Lies. He is also an executive producer of the NBC series The Irrational (2023–2025).

Baum also wrote the play The Engagement Party, which won the 2018 Edgerton Foundation New Play Award. The play had its world premiere at the Hartford Stage on January 10, 2019.

He graduated from Harvard College.
