= Lie to Me =

American crime drama television series (2009–2011)

- Genre: Crime drama Police procedural
- Created by: Samuel Baum
- Starring: Tim Roth; Kelli Williams; Brendan Hines; Monica Raymund; Hayley McFarland; Mekhi Phifer
- Opening theme: "Brand New Day" by Ryan Star
- Composers: Robert Duncan; Doug DeAngelis; Peter Nashel
- Country of origin: United States
- Original language: English
- No. of seasons: 3
- No. of episodes: 48 (list of episodes)

Production
- Executive producers: Brian Grazer; Vahan Moosekian; Daniel Sackheim; Samuel Baum; David Nevins; Elizabeth Craft; Sarah Fain; Alexander Cary; David Graziano; Shawn Ryan; Daniel Voll; Steven Maeda
- Producers: Alexander Cary; Jeffrey Downer; Tim Roth
- Cinematography: Sidney Sidell; Joseph E. Gallagher; Alan Caso; David Geddes; Florian Ballhaus
- Editors: Devon Greene; David Post; Rick Tuber; David C. Cook; David Siegel; Padraic McKinley; Thomas R. Moore; Gib Jaffe; Monty DeGraff; Marta Evry; Thom Noble; Suzy Elmiger
- Running time: 42 minutes
- Production companies: Imagine Television; Pagoda Pictures; Samuel Baum Productions; MiddKid Productions; 20th Century Fox Television

Original release
- Network: Fox
- Release: January 21, 2009 – January 31, 2011

Lie to Me (stylized as Lie to me*) is an American crime drama television series created by Samuel Baum that aired on Fox from January 21, 2009, to January 31, 2011. In the show, Dr. Cal Lightman (Tim Roth) and his colleagues in The Lightman Group accept assignments from third parties (commonly local and federal law enforcement), and assist in investigations, reaching the truth through applied psychology: interpreting microexpressions, using the Facial Action Coding System, and analyzing body language. In May 2009, the show was renewed for a second season consisting of 13 episodes; season two premiered on September 28, 2009. On November 24, 2009, Fox ordered an extra nine episodes for season two, bringing the season order to 22 episodes.

On May 12, 2010, Entertainment Weekly reported that Lie to Me received a 13-episode third season pick-up. The third season of Lie to Me was originally set to premiere on November 10, 2010. On September 28, 2010, the date was moved up to October 4, 2010, due to the cancellation of the television series Lone Star. On May 11, 2011, Fox canceled Lie to Me, along with several other shows, after three seasons.

Lie to Me was inspired by the work of Paul Ekman, a specialist in the study of facial expressions and a professor emeritus of psychology at the University of California San Francisco School of Medicine. Ekman has been an advisor to police departments and anti-terrorism groups. Ekman was a scientific consultant during the production of the series. The lead character of Lie to Me, Cal Lightman, is slightly based on Ekman's career.

== Cast and characters ==
=== Main ===
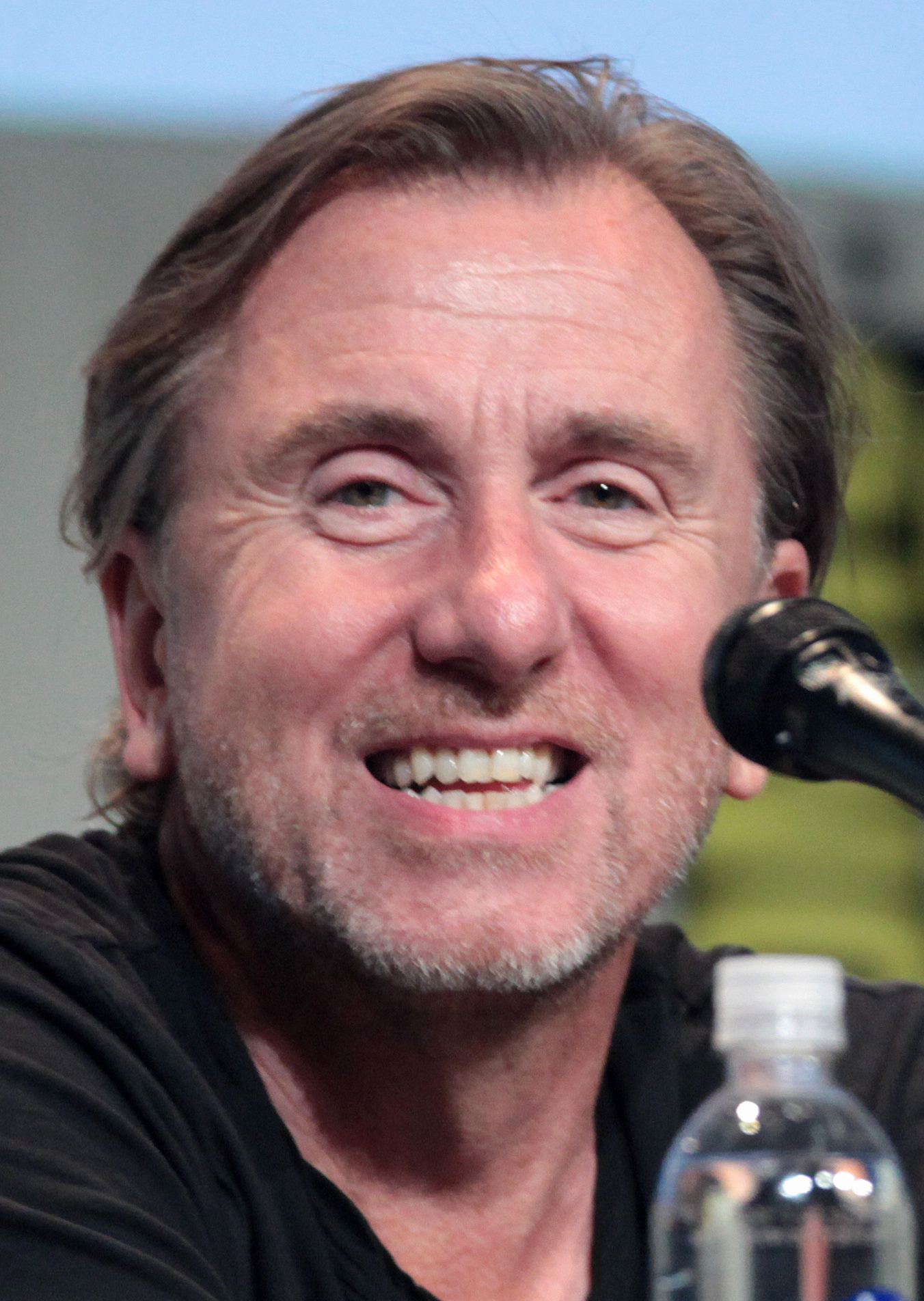
Tim Roth, who plays the role of lead character Cal Lightman

- Tim Roth as Dr. Cal Lightman, a brilliant expert in the science of body language, especially microexpressions, and founder of The Lightman Group, a private company that operates as an independent contractor to assist investigations of local and federal law enforcement through applied psychology. Though often confronted by people's skepticism, Lightman uses any technique he deems necessary to reach the truth, however elaborate or confronting. He is divorced and shares custody of his teenage daughter. He cares deeply about his colleague Gillian Foster, and there is a chemistry between them that has yet to develop into anything more; in the Season 3 finale, he confesses to his daughter that he loves her. His mother committed suicide while he was still young, an event that led him to discovering and researching microexpressions. There is evidence he was involved with British intelligence in Northern Ireland. Lightman also mentioned interrogating militant suspects recalling his release of one suspect resulted in the shootings of six and the deaths of three in a murder operation the suspect subsequently carried out. He has also admitted to being an MI6 intelligence agent during the Yugoslav Wars (1994) in an attempt to gain the trust of an intelligence agent that he was interrogating. Lightman is a West Ham United supporter as he mentions himself in Season 2, and was seen wearing a Claret and Blue scarf in one of the later episodes of Season 2.
- Kelli Williams as Dr. Gillian Foster, Dr. Lightman's psychologist colleague in The Lightman Group who analyses patterns of voice, language, and behavior. She can be somewhat impulsive but is very professional with the clients and subjects in public. While she occasionally disagrees with some of Lightman's actions, she has an open pact with Lightman: not to let their professional skill interfere with coworkers' personal lives. Her husband's lack of candor often challenges this. When Cal believes her husband, Alec, is cheating on her, he simply ignores what he is seeing, much to character Ria Torres's dismay. It is later revealed that he was not cheating on her but was trying to overcome his drug addiction; they promptly divorce. Gillian had adopted a baby (Sophie) who was eventually returned to the birth mother. This character is based on Maureen O'Sullivan, emeritus professor of psychology at the University of San Francisco.
- Brendan Hines as Eli Loker, an employee of The Lightman Group. Unlike Torres, whom Lightman calls "a natural", Loker acquired his skills in "reading" people through academic education and practice. During Season 1, he also adheres to Radical Honesty and thus rarely lies, even if that makes him appear rude or undiplomatic. Lightman demoted him to an unpaid intern after, despite Foster's warnings, he divulged sensitive information to the SEC while working on a case. However, he is later promoted to vice president, which causes a rift in any developing relationship between him and Torres.
- Monica Raymund as Ria Torres, an employee of The Lightman Group and Dr. Lightman's protégée, who was recognized as a "natural" while she was still working as a TSA Transportation Security Officer. Torres was abused as a child, a common pattern among naturals. Though talented and loyal, she lacks academic training and sometimes lets her emotions cloud her judgment. She has a half-sister who was in juvenile prison and is now enrolled at a private school.

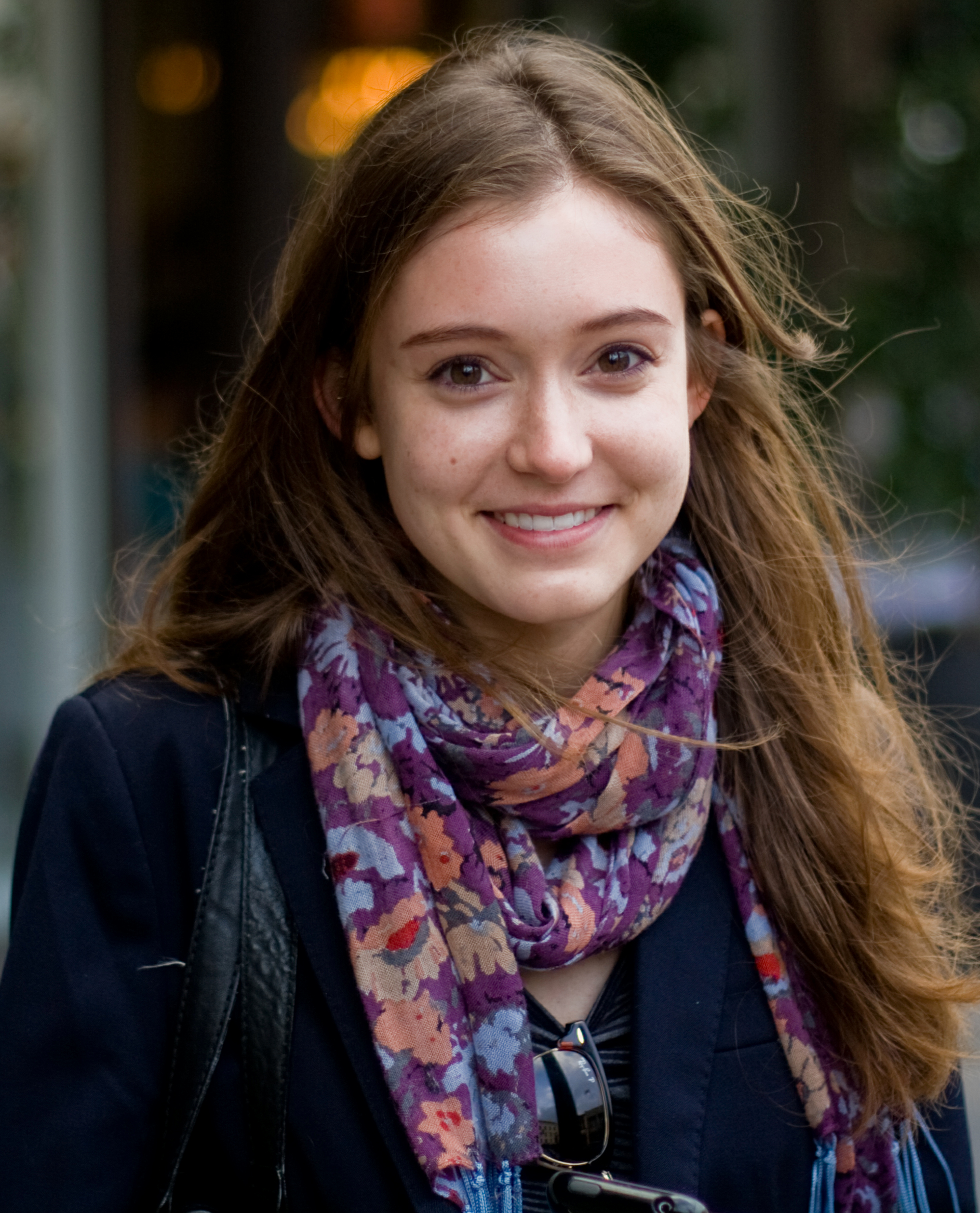
Hayley McFarland, who plays the role of Emily Lightman

- Hayley McFarland as Emily Lightman, Cal Lightman's teenage daughter. Her parents share custody of her, and, while she does not appreciate her father's ability to "read" her, she does not deny its merit for social screening. She has boyfriends over the series who her father scrutinizes. Though she sometimes gets into trouble and has fake IDs, and, to Lightman's chagrin, has been sexually active, she is generally well behaved and has a loving relationship with her father. (Recurring: Season 1; regular: Seasons 2–3)
- Mekhi Phifer as Ben Reynolds, an FBI agent who is assigned to and assists the Lightman Group in their investigations, offering armed assistance, practical insights, and access to FBI resources and connections. Reynolds does not always agree with Lightman's ways but stands behind him most of the time. (Recurring: season 1, regular: season 2)

=== Recurring ===
- Jennifer Beals as Zoe Landau, Cal Lightman's ex-wife and Emily's mother, an Assistant Attorney General. While engaged to another man, she also engaged in a tryst with Lightman, after he helped her in a case. (Seasons 1 & 2)
- Tim Guinee as Alec Foster, Gillian Foster's ex-husband. He works at the United States Department of State and is a recovering cocaine addict. Throughout the series it was heavily hinted that he was having an extramarital affair until it was revealed that the woman was his CA sponsor. He and Gillian divorced. (Season 1)
- Sean Patrick Thomas as Special Agent Karl Dupree. Dupree initially assisted the Lightman Group on a case involving a controversial South Korean ambassador who is presumed to be an assassination target at his son's state wedding. Torres and Dupree are romantically involved later in season one. He also defends Torres against Loker when he divulged sensitive information to the SEC while working on a case. (Season 1)
- Melissa George as Clara Musso. She was Zoe Landau's first big client, so Lightman helped her find out who really killed her husband and prove her innocence. She later inherited her husband's company, and showed interest in Lightman's work on deception detection, in that she paid him to teach her some techniques, and then invested in his firm. (Season 2)
- Monique Gabriela Curnen as Detective Sharon Wallowski, a police officer who assists Lightman. She also engages in a romantic relationship with Lightman, but ends it once Lightman finds out the truth about her past as a dirty cop. (Guest Season 2, Season 3)
- Brandon Jones as Liam, Emily Lightman's boyfriend, a high school jock who is not intimidated by Cal Lightman. Emily breaks up with him because he does not believe in sex before marriage. (Season 3)

== Plot ==
Season one opens with Cal and Gillian hiring a new associate: TSA officer Ria Torres, who scored extraordinarily high on Cal's deception-detection diagnostic, and is in turn labeled a "natural" at deception detection. Her innate talent in the field clashes with Cal's academic approach, and he often shows off by rapidly analyzing her every facial expression. She counters by reading Lightman and, when he least expects it, peppers conversations with quotes from his books.

It was gradually revealed that Dr. Lightman was driven to study micro-expressions as a result of guilt over his mother's suicide. She claimed to have been fine in order to obtain a weekend pass from a psychiatric ward, when she was actually experiencing agony (which parallels an anecdote in Paul Ekman's book "Telling Lies").

For a small number of the early episodes, Lightman would team up with Torres to work on a case, while Foster and Loker would team up on a separate case. Occasionally, their work would intertwine, or Foster and/or Lightman would provide assistance on each other's cases. As the first season progressed, the cases became more involved, and all four of the main characters would work together on one case for each episode.

In addition to detecting deception in subjects they interview, Lightman and his team also use various interviewing and interrogation tactics to elicit useful information. Rather than by force, they use careful lines of questioning, provocative statements, theatrics and healthy doses of deception on their own part. In the show's pilot episode, Lightman is speaking to a man who is refusing to speak at all, and is able to discern vital information by talking to him and gauging his reaction to each statement. This approach is also taken in several other episodes (e.g., "Do No Harm").

== Episodes ==
Season	Episodes	Originally released	
Season	Episodes	First released	Last released
1	13	January 21, 2009	May 13, 2009
2	22	September 28, 2009	September 13, 2010
3	13	October 4, 2010	January 31, 2011

== Production ==
Samuel Baum was the original showrunner and head writer on Lie to Me. Brian Grazer, David Nevins, and Steven Maeda were executive producers. Katherine Pope, former president of NBC Universal's TV studio, signed on as a consulting producer, working on the final four episodes of the first season. Shawn Ryan, creator of The Shield and The Unit, took over as showrunner for the second season.

Lightman Group offices use the Walter E. Washington Convention Center at 801 Mt Vernon Place NW, Washington, D.C. 20001.

The show's theme song, "Brand New Day", was performed by Ryan Star.

== Reception ==
=== Critical reception ===
The show received mostly positive reviews from television critics. It has a weighted average score of 64 out of 100 based on 24 reviews on Metacritic. Entertainment Weekly's Ken Tucker awarded Lie to Me a B− rating and wrote "Lie to Me is derivative yet well crafted, predictable yet ever-so-slightly novel ... it's no wonder that Fox thinks it's got itself a potential hit", and added that "if this review were a face, Dr. Lightman would say it had a forced smile: hopeful, but dubious, about Lie's chances." Tom Shales, writing for The Washington Post, said "Lie to Me seems an unusually meaty, thoughtful and thought-provoking crime drama – another police procedural, yes, but one with a dramatic and mesmerizing difference… easily one of the season's best new shows."

=== Ratings ===
In the United States, the viewing figures declined as the series progressed. The pilot episode was seen by 12.37 million; however, by the final episode of the first season, it was down to 8.46 million. The most viewed episode was episode three, "A Perfect Score", which attracted 12.99 million. The second season premiered on September 28, 2009, to 7.73 million viewers. The season two finale was watched by 4.94 million viewers in the U.S. on September 13, 2010. The third season, which had its premiere moved forward to October 4, 2010, was viewed by 5.87 million people in the U.S. The series' official cancellation was announced by Fox on May 10, 2011.

==== Seasonal ratings ====
Season	Episodes	Original airing			Rank	Viewers (in millions)	Notes	Network
Season	Episodes	Season premiere	Season finale	TV season	Rank	Viewers (in millions)	Notes	Network
1	13	January 21, 2009	May 13, 2009	2008–2009	#29	11.06		Fox
2	22	September 28, 2009	September 13, 2010	2009–2010	#57	7.39	(Note: The season 2 ranking and average viewers only covers the first 10 of 22 episodes in season 2. Episodes 11 through 22 of season 2 were broadcast beginning on June 7, 2010.)	Fox
3	13	October 4, 2010	January 31, 2011	2010–2011	#78	6.71		Fox

=== Awards and nominations ===
==== Primetime Emmy Awards ====
- 2009 Primetime Emmy Award for Outstanding Main Title Design (nominee)

==== People's Choice Awards ====
Lie to me was nominated for two awards at the 37th People's Choice Awards and won both of them.

- 2011 Favorite TV Crime Drama (WON)
- 2011 Favorite TV Crime Fighter (Tim Roth, WON)

== International broadcasting ==
The series was broadcast on Global in Canada and Network Ten in Australia. Lie to Me aired on Sky1 in the United Kingdom and on RTÉ Two in Ireland, starting on May 14, 2009. On July 20, 2009, Fox aired the premiere in Latin America.

== Home media ==
As of March 2020, all episodes are available on the streaming service Hulu. Also available on the Disney plus platform (for a fee).

Season one and two have been released on DVD in Regions 1, 2 and 4. However, while season one was also released on Blu-ray in North America there has been no announcement about releasing the second season on Blu-ray. The first and second season DVDs sets include deleted scenes and behind-the-scenes featurettes. The second season also includes "Dr. Ekman's Blog" and a gag reel. The third and final season was released on October 4, 2011.

Season	DVD release date			Blu-ray release date			
Season	DVD release date			Region A		Region B	
Season	Region 1	Region 2	Region 4	United States	Canada	United Kingdom	Australia
1	August 25, 2009	September 14, 2009	October 28, 2009	August 25, 2009		—N/a	December 5, 2012
2	November 9, 2010	January 3, 2011	December 1, 2010	—N/a	—N/a	—N/a	—N/a
3	October 4, 2011	—N/a	November 2, 2011	—N/a	—N/a	Cancelled	

== See also ==
- Lie detection
- Microexpression
- Wizards Project
