= Sneakerella (soundtrack) =

Soundtrack album by Sneakerella cast
- Released: May 13, 2022
- Genre: Pop
- Length: 33:10
- Label: Walt Disney

Singles from Sneakerella
- 1. "Kicks" Released: April 29, 2022

Sneakerella is a soundtrack album by the cast of the film of the same name, released on May 13, 2022, by Walt Disney Records.

== Background ==
The soundtrack was released on May 13, 2022, to coincide the release of the film. The CD was released on June 24, 2022. The soundtrack consists of 13 songs, with 11 original songs and a cover of "A Dream is a Wish Your Heart Makes" from Cinderella.

== Singles ==
"Kicks", performed by Chosen Jacobs was released as a single on April 29, 2022.

== Track listing ==
Sneakerella (Original Soundtrack) track listing
No.	Title	Writer(s)	Performer(s)	Length
1.	"Kicks"	Tim James; Thomas Sturges; Antonina Armato; Adam Schmalholz	Chosen Jacobs	2:46
2.	"Best Ever"	Clyde Lawrence; Jordan Cohen; Gracie Lawrence	Jacobs; Lexi Underwood	3:17
3.	"Best Ever" (Reprise)	Cohen; Lawrence; Lawrence	Jacobs; Underwood	0:39
4.	"In Your Shoes"	Will Jay; Brandon C. Rogers; Jason Mater	Jacobs	1:57
5.	"Work Up"	Dewain Whitmore; Tony Ferrari; Sean Turk	Jacobs	1:55
6.	"Life Is What You Make It"	Tova; Doug Rockwell	Juan Chioran; Jacobs; Devyn Nekoda	3:07
7.	"A Dream Is a Wish Your Heart Makes"	Al Hoffman; Jerry Livingston; Mack David	Jacobs; Underwood	1:51
8.	"Perfect Fit"	Greg Bonnick; Hayden Chapman	Underwood; Robyn Alomar	2:16
9.	"Shut It Down"	Farrah King	Hayward Leach; Kolton Stewart	2:38
10.	"Finale"	Jordan Powers; Frankie Wood; Ron "Neff-U" Feemster	Cast of Sneakerella	5:28
11.	"Life Is What You Make It" (Reprise)	Tova; Rockwell	Jacobs; Underwood; Chioran	2:44
12.	"A Dream Is a Wish Your Heart Makes" (Remix)	Hoffman; Livingston; David	Jacobs; Underwood	2:14
13.	"Fly Higher"	Feemster	Ron "Neff-U" Feemster; Julia Pratt	2:11

== Reception ==
Brian Kitson of Cosmic Circus Broadway said that the music spans genres and the songs were fun and catchy. Kitson also states that the songs are a testament to Lin-Manuel Miranda. He noted that the song "Kicks" will get a fair amount of plays on his family's playlist. Kitson adds that "Best Ever" and its uplifting pop beats will also be heavily played.
