= Zombies (soundtrack) =

2018 soundtrack album

Soundtrack album / cast recording by the original cast of Zombies
- Released: February 16, 2018
- Recorded: 2017–2018
- Genre: Pop; hip hop; ballad
- Length: 27:19
- Label: Walt Disney

The original cast of Zombies chronology
| Zombies (2018) | Zombies 2 (2020) |

Singles from Zombies (Original TV Movie Soundtrack)
- 1. "Bamm" Released: October 20, 2017

Zombies (Original TV Movie Soundtrack) (Note: also marketed as ZOMBIES (Original TV Movie Soundtrack)) is the soundtrack to the Disney Channel Original Movie Zombies. Released in conjunction with the film's linear television premiere on February 16, 2018, the album featured original songs performed by the cast involving Milo Manheim, Meg Donnelly, Kylee Russell and Trevor Tordjman as the featuring artists.

== Background ==
According to Steven Vincent, executive vice president of the Disney Music Group, the 1990s hip hop music served as the inspiration for curating the film's soundtrack. Most of the songwriters and producers were executives from the Disney Music Group, where most of them were newcomers in order to keep the sound fresh.

A single from the film "Bamm" was released on October 20, 2017. It was performed by Milo Manheim, Meg Donnelly and Kylee Russell, and was produced by Ali Dee Theodore. The accompanying music video was released on February 16, 2018.

== Track listing ==
| No. | Title | Writer(s) | Producer(s) | Length |
|---|---|---|---|---|
| 1. | "My Year" (Zombies cast) | Hanna Jones; Jack Kugell; Matt Wong | Jones; Kugell; Wong | 3:29 |
| 2. | "Fired Up" (Cast) | Mitch Allan; Nikki Leonti Edgar | Allan | 3:32 |
| 3. | "Someday" (Milo Manheim and Meg Donnelly) | Dustin Burnett; Paula Winger | Burnett | 3:03 |
| 4. | "Bamm" (Milo Manheim, Meg Donnelly and Kylee Russell) | Ali "Dee" Theodore; Anthony Mirabella; Julian Davis; Sarai Howard; Sergio Cabral | Theodore | 3:06 |
| 5. | "Someday (Ballad)" (Milo Manheim and Meg Donnelly) | Burnett; Winger | Burnett | 3:32 |
| 6. | "Stand" (Meg Donnelly feat. Trevor Tordjman) | Matthew Tishler | Tishler | 3:43 |
| 7. | "Fired Up (Competition)" (Cast) | Allan; Edgar | Theodore | 2:53 |
| 8. | "Bamm (Zombie Block Party)" (Cast) | Theodore; Mirabella; Davis; Howard; Cabral | Theodore | 1:17 |
| 9. | "Our Year" (Cast) | Jones; Kugell; Wong | Theodore; Mirabella | 0:58 |
| 10. | "Pep Rally" (Cast) | Theodore | Theodore | 1:46 |
| Total length: | | | | 27:19 |

== Score album ==
Music from Zombies (Original Score)

Film score by George S. Clinton
- Released: November 20, 2020
- Recorded: 2017–2018
- Genre: Film score
- Length: 11:51
- Label: Walt Disney
- Producer: George S. Clinton

George S. Clinton chronology
| Multiple Maniacs (2016) | Zombies (2018) | Zombies 2 (2020) |

Music from Zombies (Original Score) is the score album that featured the combined incidental music underscored by George S. Clinton for the film and its sequel, which was also co-composed by Amit May Cohen. The album was released on November 20, 2020, through Walt Disney Records. Tracks 1–7 features the music from the first film.

=== Track listing ===
| No. | Title | Length |
|---|---|---|
| 1. | "Saga/Zed" | 1:46 |
| 2. | "The Fence/Meet Principal Lee/Funky Bonzo/Zombie Alarm" | 2:22 |
| 3. | "Potential/Cheer Initiation" | 2:20 |
| 4. | "Awesome Cheers" | 0:55 |
| 5. | "Zombie Attack" | 2:08 |
| 6. | "Don't Say That" | 1:06 |
| 7. | "Cheertastic/Party Time" | 1:14 |
| Total length: | | 11:51 |

== Chart performance ==
=== Weekly charts ===
| Chart (2018–2022) | Peak position |
|---|---|
| UK Compilation Albums (OCC) | 37 |
| UK Soundtrack Albums (OCC) | 16 |
| US Billboard 200 | 55 |
| US Kid Albums (Billboard) | 1 |
| US Top Current Album Sales (Billboard) | 18 |
| US Top Soundtracks (Billboard) | 5 |

=== Year-end charts ===
| Chart (2018) | Position |
|---|---|
| US Kid Albums (Billboard) | 5 |

== Certifications ==
| Region | Certification | Certified units/sales |
|---|---|---|
| United States (RIAA) | Gold | 500,000^{‡} |
^{‡} Sales+streaming figures based on certification alone.
