= Jonas Brothers Live 2013 =

2013 concert tour by the Jonas Brothers

- Continental tour by Jonas Brothers
- Location: North America
- Associated album: V (unreleased)
- Start date: June 1, 2013
- End date: October 8, 2013
- Legs: 2
- No. of shows: 32

Jonas Brothers concert chronology
- Jonas Brothers World Tour 2012/2013 (2012–2013); Jonas Brothers Live (2013); Happiness Begins Tour (2019–2020)

The Jonas Brothers Live 2013 was the ninth concert tour by American pop/rock band, the Jonas Brothers, before their split on October 29, 2013. This tour included cities in the United States and Canada to promote their unreleased album V after their fourth studio album, Lines, Vines and Trying Times (2009).

On October 9, 2013, the group cancelled their highly anticipated comeback tour days before it was slated to start, citing a "deep rift within the band" over "creative differences", later announcing their break-up as a band on October 29, 2013. After their split, the band released their second live album after the tour ended, which is composed of live performances from their Los Angeles and Uncasville shows and five original studio recordings that would've been on V.

== Support acts ==
- Karmin (North America; July 10 – August 16)
- Olivia Somerlyn (now Livvia) (San Francisco, San Diego, Los Angeles)
- Bonnie McKee (North America; October 11 – November 6) (cancelled)

== Tour cancellation and disbandment ==
On October 9, 2013, the band cancelled 23 tour dates between October and December, mentioning a "deep rift within the band" over "creative differences". On October 29, 2013, the Jonas Brothers announced their disbandment. Nick Jonas gave an interview stating that their then-upcoming album wouldn't be released, but that they decided to release a few songs in a live album: "We want to do something special for our fans because they've been so supportive of us for so many years. What we've decided to do is package an album with 10 live tracks from the summer tour and four of the songs that would have been on 'V', and if you count 'Pom Poms' and 'First Time', it's actually 6 songs that would have been on 'V'. We’ll be sending that out soon for the fans." The album was released on November 26, 2013, titled Live, with "V" in caps as a reference to their unreleased and unfinished fifth studio album that would receive that name.

The band went on hiatus until their comeback in 2019 with the release of their single Sucker, which debuted atop of the Billboard Hot 100.

== Set list ==
The following set list is representative of the show on July 10, 2013. It is not representative of all concerts for the duration of the tour.

1. "First Time"
2. "Paranoid"
3. "Pom Poms"
4. "Found" (new song)
5. "Who I Am"
6. "That's Just the Way We Roll"
7. "Make It Right"
8. "Before the Storm"
9. "The World (new song)
10. "Fly with Me"
11. "Wedding Bells"
12. "See No More" (Joe Jonas cover)
13. "What Do I Mean to You" (new song)
14. "Still in Love with You"
15. "Last Time Around"
16. "Don't Say" (new song)
17. "Hello Beautiful" (audience pick)
18. "When You Look Me in the Eyes"
19. "Burnin' Up"
20. "Gotta Find You"
21. "Lovebug"
22. "S.O.S"

== Tour dates ==
List of 2013 concerts
Date	City	Country	Venue
June 1, 2013^{[A]}	Acapulco	Mexico	Fórum de Mundo Imperial
June 19, 2013^{[B]}	New York City	United States	Oakley Flagship Store
July 3, 2013^{[C]}	Orlando	United States	Crane's Roost Park
July 10, 2013	Chicago	United States	Charter One Pavilion
July 12, 2013	Noblesville	United States	Klipsch Music Center
July 13, 2013	Clarkston	United States	DTE Energy Music Theatre
July 14, 2013	Cincinnati	United States	Riverbend Music Center
July 16, 2013	Cuyahoga Falls	United States	Blossom Music Center
July 18, 2013	Toronto	Canada	Molson Canadian Amphitheatre
July 20, 2013	Wantagh	United States	Nikon at Jones Beach Theater
July 22, 2013	Boston	United States	Bank of America Pavilion
July 23, 2013	Uncasville	United States	Mohegan Sun Arena
July 25, 2013	Holmdel	United States	PNC Bank Arts Center
July 26, 2013	Atlantic City	United States	Borgata Event Center
July 27, 2013^{[D]}	Hershey	United States	Hersheypark Stadium
July 29, 2013	Bristow	United States	Jiffy Lube Live
July 30, 2013	Charlotte	United States	Time Warner Cable Uptown Amphitheater
July 31, 2013	Raleigh	United States	Red Hat Amphitheater
August 2, 2013	West Palm Beach	United States	Cruzan Amphitheatre
August 3, 2013	Tampa	United States	Live Nation Amphitheatre
August 4, 2013	Atlanta	United States	Chastain Park Amphitheater
August 6, 2013	Dallas	United States	Gexa Energy Pavilion
August 7, 2013	The Woodlands	United States	Cynthia Woods Mitchell Pavilion
August 9, 2013	Phoenix	United States	Comerica Theatre
August 10, 2013	Las Vegas	United States	Mandalay Bay Events Center
August 13, 2013	San Francisco	United States	America's Cup Pavilion
August 14, 2013	San Diego	United States	Viejas Arena
August 15, 2013^{[E]}	Dallas	United States	House of Blues
August 16, 2013	Los Angeles	United States	Gibson Amphitheatre
September 20, 2013^{[F]}	Toronto	Canada	Air Canada Centre
September 26, 2013	Waikiki	United States	iconic Sunset on the Beach
October 8, 2013^{[G]}	Saint Paul	United States	Xcel Energy Center

Festivals and other miscellaneous performances
^{A} These concert is a part of the Acapulco Festival
^{B} These concert is a part of Live Music Day Festival
^{C} These concert is a part of Red Hot & Boom
^{D} These concert is a part of the Mixtape Festival
^{E} These concert is a part of Concert of Kidd's Kids
^{F} These concert is a part of the We Day Toronto
^{G} These concert is a part of the We Day Minneapolis

=== Cancelled dates ===
List of cancelled concerts
Date	City	Country	Venue	Reason
July 19, 2013	Darien	United States	Darien Lake Performing Arts Center	Cancelled due to weather
October 11, 2013	Upper Darby Township	United States	Tower Theater	Cancelled
October 12, 2013	Montclair	United States	Wellmont Theater	Cancelled
October 13, 2013	Toms River	United States	Pine Belt Arena	Cancelled
October 15, 2013	Albany	United States	Palace Theatre	Cancelled
October 16, 2013	Montreal	Canada	Metropolis	Cancelled
October 18, 2013	Boston	United States	Orpheum	Cancelled
October 19, 2013	Hampton Beach	United States	Hampton Beach Casino Ballroom	Cancelled
October 20, 2013	Westbury	United States	NYCB Theatre at Westbury	Cancelled
October 21, 2013	Silver Spring	United States	The Fillmore Silver Spring	Cancelled
October 23, 2013	New York City	United States	Hammerstein Ballroom	Cancelled
October 24, 2013	Columbus	United States	Lifestyle Communities Pavilion	Cancelled
October 25, 2013	Charleston	United States	The Clay Center	Cancelled
October 26, 2013	Greensburg	United States	Palace Theatre	Cancelled
October 28, 2013	Milwaukee	United States	Riverside Theater	Cancelled
October 30, 2013	Maplewood	United States	Myth Live	Cancelled
October 31, 2013	Kansas City	United States	The Midland by AMC	Cancelled
November 1, 2013	Denver	United States	Bellco Theatre	Cancelled
November 3, 2013	Napa	United States	Uptown Theater	Cancelled
November 5, 2013	Vancouver	Canada	Orpheum Theater	Cancelled
November 6, 2013	Seattle	United States	Paramount Theatre	Cancelled
December 12, 2013	Buffalo	United States	First Niagara Center	Cancelled
December 14, 2013	Rosemont	United States	Allstate Arena	Cancelled
