= Jonas Brothers World Tour 2012/2013 =

2012–13 concert tour by the Jonas Brothers

- Tour by Jonas Brothers
- Promotional poster for the concert in Manila
- Location: Asia; Europe; North America; South America
- Associated album: V (unreleased)
- Start date: October 11, 2012
- End date: March 23, 2013
- Legs: 5
- No. of shows: 28

Jonas Brothers concert chronology
- Jonas Brothers: Live in Concert (2010); Jonas Brothers World Tour 2012/2013 (2012–2013); Jonas Brothers Live 2013 (2013)

The Jonas Brothers World Tour 2012/2013 was the eighth concert tour by the Jonas Brothers, which promoted their originally-planned fifth studio album V that was ultimately cancelled. Three new songs from the original project were performed on the tour: "Let's Go", "Wedding Bells" and "First Time".

== Background ==
"Wedding Bells" was performed live for the first time on October 11 at the Radio City Music Hall in New York during the reunion concert of the Jonas Brothers, which served as opening night for the 2012/2013 Tour. The song was also performed during the Asia, European and North American legs of the tour. It was performed during Jingle Ball on December 1, 2012. and again during the Festival Internacional de la Canción de Viña del Mar.

After that the song was taken off the main setlist during the South American dates of the tour. It was performed once again on February 22 and was re-added to the main setlist of the tour. It was performed again on June 1, during the Acapulco Festival in Mexico, and during the first concert on July 10, they performed the song Wedding Bells again.

== Opening act ==
- Anna Maria Perez de Tagle (Asia)
- Mikey Deleasa (South America)

== Set lists ==
October 11 – November 8, 2012
1. When You Look Me in the Eyes
2. Much Better
3. Goodnight and Goodbye
4. That's Just the Way We Roll
5. Fly With Me
6. We Found Love
7. Give Love a Try
8. Turn Right
9. Gotta Find You
10. Just in Love
11. Who I Am
12. Hold On
13. Let's Go
14. Feel So Close / Feelin' Alive
15. Paranoid
16. First Time
17. Still in Love With You
18. BB Good
19. Last Time Around
20. Falling Slowly
21. Pushin' Me Away
22. Hello Beautiful
23. We Are Young/ Tonight
24. Wedding Bells
25. A Little Bit Longer
26. Lovebug
27. S.O.S
28. Burnin' Up
November 27, 2012
1. When You Look Me in the Eyes
2. Much Better
3. Goodnight and Goodbye
4. That's Just the Way We Roll
5. Fly With Me
6. First Time
7. Give Love a Try
8. Turn Right
9. Gotta Find You
10. Just in Love
11. Who I Am
12. Let's Go
13. Paranoid
14. Still in Love With You
15. BB Good
16. Last Time Around
17. Falling Slowly
18. Pushin' Me Away
19. Hello Beautiful
20. We Are Young / Tonight
21. Wedding Bells
22. A Little Bit Longer / Diamonds
23. Lovebug
24. S.O.S
25. Burnin' Up
November 28, 2012
1. "Paranoid"
2. "That's Just The Way We Roll"
3. "Goodnight & Goodbye"
4. "Take A Breath"
5. "Much Better"
6. "Fly with Me"
7. "Give Love A Try"
8. "Turn Right"
9. "Gotta Find You" (Camp Rock song)
10. "First Time" (New Song)
11. "Just in Love" (Joe Jonas Cover)
12. "Who I Am" (Nick Jonas & the Administration cover)
13. "Let's Go" (New Song)
14. "Still In Love With You"
15. "BB Good"
16. "Last Time Around" (Nick Jonas & the Administration cover)
17. "Falling Slowly" (Once cover)
18. "Pushin' Me Away"
19. "Hello Beautiful"
20. "We Are Young" (Fun. Cover) / "Tonight"
21. "Wedding Bells" (New Song)
22. "A Little Bit Longer" / "Yellow" (Coldplay Cover)
23. "Locked Out of Heaven" (Bruno Mars Cover)
24. "Lovebug"
25. "S.O.S"
26. "When You Look Me in the Eyes"
27. "Burnin' Up"
November 29, 2012
1. "S.O.S"
2. "That's Just The Way We Roll"
3. "Shelf"
4. "World War III"
5. "Much Better"
6. "Fly with Me"
7. "Thinkin Bout You" (Frank Ocean Cover)
8. "Give Love a Try"
9. "Turn Right"
10. "Gotta Find You" (Camp Rock song)
11. "First Time" (New Song)
12. "Just in Love" (Joe Jonas Cover)
13. "Who I Am" (Nick Jonas & the Administration cover)
14. "Let's Go" (New Song)
15. "Still In Love With You"
16. "BB Good"
17. "Last Time Around" (Nick Jonas & the Administration cover)
18. "Falling Slowly" (Once cover)
19. "Pushin' Me Away"
20. "Hello Beautiful"
21. "We Are Young" (Fun. Cover) / "Tonight"
22. "Wedding Bells" (New Song)
23. "A Little Bit Longer" (Acoustic guitar) / "Diamonds" (Rihanna Cover) / "Yellow" (Coldplay Cover)
24. "Lovebug"
25. "Paranoid"
26. "When You Look Me in the Eyes"
27. "Burnin' Up"
December 1, 2012
1. "S.O.S"
2. "Paranoid"
3. "Let's Go" (New Song)
4. "Wedding Bells" (New Song)
5. "Thinkin Bout You" (Frank Ocean Cover)
6. "Burnin' Up"
January 25, 2013
1. "S.O.S"
2. "Still In Love With You"
3. "BB Good"
4. "Last Time Around" (Nick Jonas & the Administration cover)
5. "Let's Go" (New Song)
6. "Give Love a Try"
7. "Gotta Find You" (Camp Rock song)
8. "Fly with Me"
9. "When You Look Me in the Eyes"
10. "Lovebug"
11. "Burnin' Up"
February 20, 2013
1. "S.O.S"
2. "State of Emergency" (Nick Jonas & the Administration cover)
3. "Drive"
4. "That's Just the Way We Roll"
5. "Play My Music" (Camp Rock song)
6. "Fly with Me"
7. "Give Love a Try"
8. "Turn Right"
9. "Gotta Find You" (Camp Rock song)
10. "First Time" (New Song)
11. "Don’t You Worry Child" (Swedish House Mafia cover)
12. "Just in Love" (Joe Jonas Cover)
13. "Who I Am" (Nick Jonas & the Administration cover)
14. "Paranoid"
15. "Let's Go" (New Song)
16. "Still in Love With You"
17. "BB Good"
18. "Last Time Around" (Nick Jonas & the Administration cover)
19. "Pushin Me Away"
20. "Hello Beautiful"
21. "We Are Young" (Fun. Cover) / "Tonight"
22. "Stay" (Rihanna Cover) / "Stay" (Nick Jonas & the Administration cover)
23. "Lovebug"
24. "When You Look Me in the Eyes"
25. "Burnin' Up"
February 22–8 March 2013
1. "Paranoid"
2. "Still in Love With You"
3. "BB Good"
4. "Last Time Around" (Nick Jonas & the Administration cover)
5. "That's Just the Way We Roll"
6. "Play My Music" (Camp Rock song)
7. "Give Love A Try"
8. "Turn Right" (At some concerts)
9. "Gotta Find You" (Camp Rock song)
10. "Let's Go" (New Song)
11. "Just in Love" (Joe Jonas Cover)
12. "Who I Am" (Nick Jonas & the Administration cover)
13. "Fly with Me"
14. "Wedding Bells" (New Song)
15. "Don’t You Worry Child" (Swedish House Mafia cover) (At some concerts) or "Diamonds" (Rihanna Cover) / "A Little Bit Longer" (Buenos Aires only)
16. "Pushin Me Away" (At some concerts)
17. "Hello Beautiful"
18. "We Are Young" (Fun. Cover) (At some concerts)
19. "Lovebug"
20. "S.O.S"
21. "When You Look Me in the Eyes"
22. "Burnin' Up"
3 March 2013 in Buenos Aires playlist in the middle was a little bit shuffle
March 10–23, 2013
1. "Paranoid"
2. "That's Just the Way We Roll"
3. "Still in Love With You"
4. "BB Good"
5. "Last Time Around" (Nick Jonas & the Administration cover)
6. "Play My Music" (Camp Rock song)
7. "Goodnight & Goodbye"
8. "A Team" (Ed Sheeran Cover) (At some concerts)
9. "Give Love A Try"
10. "Turn Right"
11. "Gotta Find You" (Camp Rock song)
12. "Let's Go" (New Song)
13. "Just in Love" (Joe Jonas Cover)
14. "Who I Am" (Nick Jonas & the Administration cover)
15. "Fly with Me"
16. "Wedding Bells" (New Song)
17. "Pushin Me Away"
18. "Hello Beautiful"
19. "We Are Young" (Fun. Cover) (At some concerts)
20. "Stay" (Rihanna Cover) / "Stay" (Nick Jonas & the Administration cover) (At some concerts) or "Don’t You Worry Child" (Swedish House Mafia cover) (São Paulo only)
21. "Lovebug"
22. "When You Look Me in the Eyes"
23. "Black Keys" (At some concerts)
24. "S.O.S"
25. "Burnin' Up"

21 March in Guatemala City Still in Love With You followed Paranoid, then Goodnight and Goodbye followed Last Time Around and That's Just the Way We Roll and Play My Music were performed in between Gotta Find You and Let's Go

23 March in Panama City That's Just the Way We Roll and Play My Music were performed in between Paranoid and Still in Love With You and once again Goodnight and Goodbye followed Last Time Around

== Tour dates ==
Date	City	Country	Venue
North America
October 11, 2012	New York City	United States	Radio City Music Hall
Asia
October 19, 2012	Pasay	Philippines	Mall of Asia Arena
October 20, 2012	Cebu City	Philippines	Cebu Waterfront Hotel
October 22, 2012	Singapore	Singapore	Fort Canning
October 24, 2012	Kuala Lumpur	Malaysia	Stadium Negara
Europe
November 6, 2012	Saint Petersburg	Russia	Ice Palace Saint Petersburg
November 8, 2012	Moscow	Russia	Crocus City Hall
North America
November 27, 2012	Los Angeles	United States	Pantages Theatre
November 28, 2012	Los Angeles	United States	Pantages Theatre
November 29, 2012	Los Angeles	United States	Pantages Theatre
December 1, 2012^{[A]}	Los Angeles	United States	Nokia Theatre L.A. Live
January 25, 2013^{[B]}	Phoenix	United States	Phoenix Convention Center
February 20, 2013	Monterrey	Mexico	Auditorio Banamex
February 22, 2013	Mexico City	Mexico	Sports Palace
South America
February 24, 2013	Caracas	Venezuela	Simón Bolívar University
February 26, 2013 ^{[C]}	Viña del Mar	Chile	Quinta Vergara Amphitheater
February 28, 2013	Santiago	Chile	Movistar Arena
March 2, 2013	Córdoba	Argentina	Parque Sarmiento
March 3, 2013	Buenos Aires	Argentina	Estadio Arquitecto Ricardo Etcheverry
March 5, 2013	Curitiba	Brazil	Teatro Positivo
March 8, 2013	Belo Horizonte	Brazil	Chevrolet Hall
March 10, 2013	São Paulo	Brazil	Credicard Hall
March 12, 2013	Rio de Janeiro	Brazil	Citibank Hall
March 14, 2013	Porto Alegre	Brazil	Pepsi on Stage
March 17, 2013	Asunción	Paraguay	Yacht Club Del Paraguay
March 19, 2013	Montevideo	Uruguay	Velodromo
North America
March 21, 2013	Guatemala City	Guatemala	Paseo Cayalá
March 23, 2013	Panama City	Panama	Figali Convention Center

Festivals and other miscellaneous performances
^{A} These concert is a part of the Jingle Ball
^{B} These concert is a part of the National School Choice Week's official Kickoff Celebration
^{C} These concert is a part of the Festival Internacional de la Canción de Viña del Mar

=== Box office score data ===
Venue	City	Tickets sold / available	Gross revenue
Auditorio Banamex	Monterrey, Mexico	5,639 / 6,688 (84%)	US$463,282
Palacio de los Deportes	Mexico City, Mexico	12,972 / 15,550 (83%)	US$751,832
Estadio de Futbol de la Universidad Simón Bolívar	Caracas, Venezuela	3,200 / 4,000 (80%)	US$908,397
Credicard Hall	São Paulo, Brazil	5,903 / 6,370 (92%)	US$452,419
Citibank Hall	Rio de Janeiro, Brazil	3,175 / 6,916 (46%)	US$265,089
Pepsi On Stage	Porto Alegre, Brazil	1,835 / 6,170 (29%)	US$151,236
Chevrolet Hall	Belo Horizonte, Brazil	1,755 / 4,763 (36%)	US$151,236
TOTAL		34,479 / 50,457 (68%)	US$3,143,491
