= Jonas Brothers: Live in Concert =

2010 concert tour by the Jonas Brothers

- Tour by Jonas Brothers
- Official poster
- Location: Asia; North America; South America
- Associated albums: Lines, Vines and Trying Times; Who I Am; Here We Go Again; Camp Rock 2: The Final Jam; Jonas L.A.
- Start date: August 7, 2010
- End date: November 18, 2010
- Legs: 7
- No. of shows: 43

Jonas Brothers concert chronology
- Jonas Brothers World Tour 2009 (2009); Jonas Brothers: Live in Concert (2010); Jonas Brothers World Tour 2012/2013 (2012–2013)

The Jonas Brothers: Live in Concert was the seventh concert tour by American pop rock band, the Jonas Brothers to promote on their fourth studio album Lines, Vines and Trying Times and the soundtrack to their Disney Channel show Jonas. The tour started on August 7, 2010, in Tinley Park, Illinois, and ended on November 18, 2010, in Abu Dhabi. The tour included cities in the United States, Canada, the Caribbean, Mexico, Central America, South America, and Middle East. The brothers were accompanied by Demi Lovato and the cast of Camp Rock 2: The Final Jam to promote their albums Here We Go Again and Camp Rock 2: The Final Jam respectively.

== Background ==
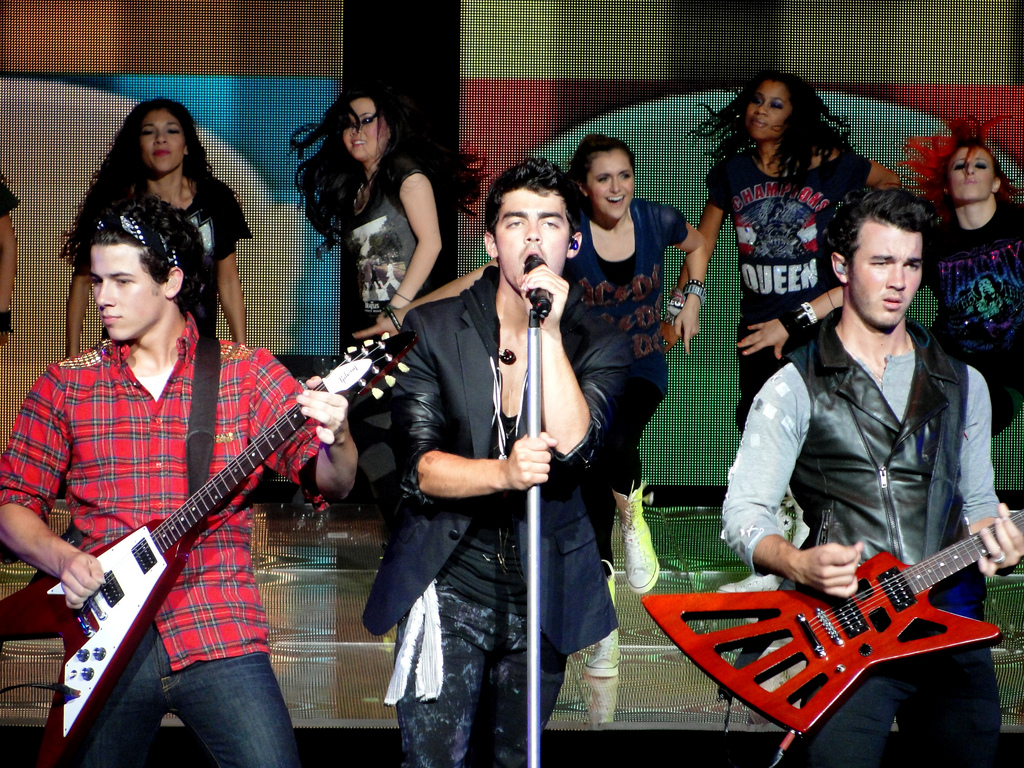
Jonas Brothers performing on their tour in September 2010

While announcing Nick Jonas' side-project Nick Jonas and the Administration, the Jonas Brothers announced they were planning a world tour to take place during the summer of 2010.

On April 27, 2010, the band and Lovato officially announced the tour, through their official websites and MySpace pages. The tour featured the band with special guests Lovato and their friends and co-stars from Camp Rock and Camp Rock 2: The Final Jam. The tour included both songs by the band and songs from the films. The pop group Savvy performed as a supporting act on select dates. The brothers set list also included songs from the soundtrack to their Disney Channel Original Series, Jonas.

The tour began on August 7, 2010, in Illinois. It was originally supposed to begin on July 27, 2010, in Dallas, but was moved back, due to changes in their schedule. Unlike the previous tour, the Jonas Brothers Live in Concert had a simple yet complex stage design. The stage consisted of multiple vertical moving screens that displayed different images or graphics while the brothers played. This concert was not in the round and played mostly in amphitheaters across the country and around the world.

Some of these tour dates have been canceled and changed. The tour started on August 6, 2010, two weeks later than planned, which allowed Nick Jonas to perform in the West End production of Les Misérables as Marius Pontmercy in London. The Tampa, Florida, tour was cancelled due to flash flooding at Tampa's 1-800-ASK-GARY Amphitheater. The San Nicolás, Mexico tour was also cancelled. Both shows were not rescheduled.

On November 1, 2010, Demi Lovato was dropped out of the tour after a dispute arose to the public light involving them apparently punching one of the dancers of the tour. After Lovato left, she was interned in a treatment center to seek out help and the tour continued without her until its last show.

== Set list ==
1. "Feelin' Alive"
2. "Hold On"
3. "Year 3000"
4. "Play My Music"
5. "Heart & Soul"
6. "Introducing Me" (Nick Jonas solo)
7. "Gotta Find You"
8. "This is Me" / "Wouldn't Change a Thing" / "This Is Our Song" (with Demi Lovato)
9. "L.A. Baby (Where Dreams Are Made Of)"
10. "Drive My Car"
11. "Paranoid"
12. "Who I Am"
13. "Fly With Me"
14. "When You Look Me in the Eyes"
15. "Please Be Mine"
16. "Lovebug"
17. "S.O.S"
18. "Burnin' Up"

Notes

- On August 22, 2010, due to inclement weather, the band did not perform "Drive My Car".
- On August 28, 2010, Nick Jonas performed "Rose Garden" in Atlantic City.
- Nick Jonas performed "Stay" during the concert in Virginia Beach.
- On September 18, 2010, Nick Jonas performed "Who I Am" and "Last Time Around".

== Tour dates ==
Date	City	Country	Venue
North America
August 7, 2010	Tinley Park	United States	First Midwest Bank Amphitheatre
August 8, 2010	Noblesville	United States	Verizon Wireless Music Center
August 10, 2010	Cincinnati	United States	Riverbend Music Center
August 11, 2010	Burgettstown	United States	First Niagara Pavilion
August 12, 2010	Bristow	United States	Jiffy Lube Live
August 13, 2010	Hartford	United States	Comcast Theatre
August 14, 2010	Hershey	United States	Hersheypark Stadium
August 16, 2010	Holmdel	United States	PNC Bank Arts Center
August 17, 2010	Holmdel	United States	PNC Bank Arts Center
August 21, 2010	Wantagh	United States	Jones Beach Theater
August 22, 2010	Wantagh	United States	Jones Beach Theater
August 25, 2010	Mansfield	United States	Comcast Center
August 26, 2010	Mansfield	United States	Comcast Center
August 27, 2010	Camden	United States	Susquehanna Bank Center
August 28, 2010	Atlantic City	United States	Etess Arena
August 29, 2010	Virginia Beach	United States	Verizon Wireless Amphitheatre
August 31, 2010	Cleveland	United States	Quicken Loans Arena
September 1, 2010	Clarkston	United States	DTE Energy Music Theatre
September 2, 2010	Toronto	Canada	Molson Canadian Amphitheatre
September 3, 2010	Toronto	Canada	Molson Canadian Amphitheatre
September 4, 2010	Montreal	Canada	Bell Centre
September 7, 2010	West Palm Beach	United States	Cruzan Amphitheatre
September 10, 2010	San Antonio	United States	AT&T Center
September 11, 2010	The Woodlands	United States	Cynthia Woods Mitchell Pavilion
September 12, 2010	Dallas	United States	Superpages.com Center
September 14, 2010	Phoenix	United States	Cricket Wireless Pavilion
September 16, 2010	Chula Vista	United States	Cricket Wireless Amphitheatre
September 17, 2010	Wheatland	United States	Sleep Train Amphitheatre
September 18, 2010	Mountain View	United States	Shoreline Amphitheatre
September 19, 2010	Irvine	United States	Verizon Wireless Amphitheatre
October 15, 2010	San Juan	Puerto Rico	José Miguel Agrelot Coliseum
October 16, 2010	Santo Domingo	Dominican Republic	Palacio de los Deportes
October 23, 2010	Guadalajara	Mexico	Estadio Tres de Marzo
October 24, 2010	Mexico City	Mexico	Foro Sol
October 26, 2010	San José	Costa Rica	Estadio Ricardo Saprissa Aymá
South America
October 28, 2010	Bogotá	Colombia	Simón Bolívar Park
October 30, 2010	Lima	Peru	Estadio Monumental
November 1, 2010	Quito	Ecuador	Estadio Olímpico Atahualpa
November 4, 2010	Santiago	Chile	Estadio Monumental David Arellano
November 6, 2010	São Paulo	Brazil	Estádio Oswaldo Teixeira Duarte
November 7, 2010	Rio de Janeiro	Brazil	Ginásio do Maracanãzinho
November 10, 2010	Porto Alegre	Brazil	Ginásio Gigantinho
November 13, 2010	Buenos Aires	Argentina	River Plate Stadium
Asia
November 18, 2010	Abu Dhabi	United Arab Emirates	Yas Arena

Cancellations

Date	City	Country	Venue	Reason
August 2, 2010	Tulsa	United States	BOK Center	Scheduling conflict Tour restructuring to accommodate international dates.
August 3, 2010	Wichita	United States	Intrust Bank Arena	Scheduling conflict Tour restructuring to accommodate international dates.
September 7, 2010	Milwaukee	United States	Summerfest	Scheduling conflict Tour restructuring to accommodate international dates.
September 8, 2010	Tampa	United States	1-800-ASK-GARY Amphitheatre	Scheduling conflict Tour restructuring to accommodate international dates.
September 8, 2010	Saint Paul	United States	Xcel Energy Center	Scheduling conflict Tour restructuring to accommodate international dates.
September 9, 2010	Omaha	United States	CenturyLink Center Omaha	Scheduling conflict Tour restructuring to accommodate international dates.
September 14, 2010	Auburn	United States	White River Amphitheatre	Scheduling conflict Tour restructuring to accommodate international dates.
September 15, 2010	Vancouver	Canada	Rogers Arena	Scheduling conflict Tour restructuring to accommodate international dates.
September 19, 2010	Concord	United States	Concord Pavilion	Scheduling conflict Tour restructuring to accommodate international dates.
September 21, 2010	Fresno	United States	Save Mart Center	Scheduling conflict Tour restructuring to accommodate international dates.
September 29, 2010	Oklahoma City	United States	Chesapeake Energy Arena	Scheduling conflict Tour restructuring to accommodate international dates.
September 30, 2010	North Little Rock	United States	Verizon Arena	Scheduling conflict Tour restructuring to accommodate international dates.
October 6, 2010	New Orleans	United States	Smoothie King Center	Scheduling conflict Tour restructuring to accommodate international dates.
October 12, 2010	Orlando	United States	Amway Center	Scheduling conflict Tour restructuring to accommodate international dates.
October 14, 2010	Atlanta	United States	Lakewood Amphitheatre	Scheduling conflict Tour restructuring to accommodate international dates.
October 15, 2010	Nashville	United States	Bridgestone Arena	Scheduling conflict Tour restructuring to accommodate international dates.
October 16, 2010	Charlotte	United States	Verizon Wireless Amphitheatre	Scheduling conflict Tour restructuring to accommodate international dates.
October 17, 2010	Raleigh	United States	Time Warner Cable Music Pavilion	Scheduling conflict Tour restructuring to accommodate international dates.
October 21, 2010	San Nicolás	Mexico	Estadio Universitario	Scheduling conflict Tour restructuring to accommodate international dates.

=== Box office score data ===
Venue	City	Tickets sold/available	Gross revenue
Hersheypark Stadium	Hershey	15,607 / 28,262 (55%)	US$756,490
DTE Energy Music Center	Clarkston	15,158 / 15,158 (100%)	US$616,829
Bell Centre	Montreal	9,162 / 12,462 (74%)	US$765,464
José Miguel Agrelot Coliseum	San Juan	8,304 / 13,128 (63%)	US$690,978
Estadio do Caninde	São Paulo	9,831 / 21,205 (43%)	US$1,701,270
Pista de Atletismo	Rio de Janeiro	6,612 / 8,390 (79%)	US$999,107
Ginásio Gigantinho	Porto Alegre	6,887 / 11,925 (58%)	US$735,152
TOTAL		71,561 / 110,530 (65%)	US$6,265,290

== Road Dogs games ==
For the second year in a row, the Jonas Brothers held several softball games with their team the "Road Dogs" throughout the tour. The games were part of the "X the TXT" campaign which brings awareness to the dangers of texting while driving. "We’re a part of the "X the Text" campaign with our sponsor Allstate, which is an amazing thing. So many teen drivers and drivers out there have accidents texting while driving, and it's such a [great] thing to bring awareness to this", told Kevin Jonas to MTV.

=== Games dates ===
Date	City	State
United States
August 6, 2010	Joliet	Illinois
August 12, 2010	Washington, D.C.	
August 13, 2010	Hartford	Connecticut
August 16, 2010	Newark	New Jersey
August 19, 2010	Queens	New York
August 21, 2010	Islip	New York
August 26, 2010	Boston	Massachusetts
August 27, 2010	Camden	New Jersey
September 7, 2010	Jupiter	Florida
September 11, 2010	Houston	Texas
September 12, 2010	Fort Worth	Texas
September 18, 2010	San Jose	California
September 19, 2010	Irvine	California
