= Jonas Brothers World Tour 2009 =

2009 concert tour by the Jonas Brothers

- Tour by Jonas Brothers
- Promotional poster
- Location: Europe; North America; South America
- Associated album: Lines, Vines and Trying Times
- Start date: May 18, 2009
- End date: December 13, 2009
- Legs: 9
- No. of shows: 86
- Box office: $96.6 million ($138.6 million adj. for 2023 inflation)

Jonas Brothers concert chronology
- The Burning Up Tour (2008–09); Jonas Brothers World Tour 2009 (2009); Jonas Brothers: Live in Concert (2010)

The Jonas Brothers World Tour 2009 was the sixth concert tour and third headlining tour by the Jonas Brothers. It began on May 18, 2009 in Lima, Peru and ended on December 13, 2009 in San Juan, Puerto Rico. The Jonas Brothers played on multiple continents around the world. Honor Society and Wonder Girls served as the opening acts, with Jordin Sparks as a special guest. The tour coincided with the release of their fourth studio album Lines, Vines and Trying Times which was released on June 16, 2009. The tour won the Eventful Fans' Choice Award at the 2009 Billboard Touring Awards and became the 6th highest selling tour in 2009 after The Circus Tour, the I Am... World Tour, the Sticky & Sweet Tour, the U2 360° Tour and the Wonder World Tour.

== Stage ==
The stage was set up as an in-the-round at the center of the venue measuring 144-feet-wide to allow for better audience viewing. It incorporated many features such as a one-of-a-kind large circular water screen, a giant crane that extends over the audience, laser and automated video effects and a double Lazy Susan at the center stage, consisting of one in the center and an outer one as a ring around the other. It was designed similar to Britney Spears' Circus Tour. The tour used this stage for all of its legs except for the Caribbean and the South America legs of the tour, where they decided to use a normal stage with catwalk instead.

== Support ==
Demi Lovato supported them in Europe and also in all their Latin America tour dates.

British girl group Girls Can't Catch performed in United Kingdom tour dates.

The Wonder Girls, a South Korean girl group, joined the Jonas Brothers in various North American tour dates. Although, on July 1, it was announced that the Jonas Brothers and their management asked the Wonder Girls to open for their entire tour.

Also new pop singer Jessie James was added as a guest on tour. She served as a host for the concerts in June introducing each act and performing her single Wanted. She performed in all of the shows in June, 2009. She however did not perform at the Portland, Oregon concert.

Jordin Sparks did not appear at the San Antonio or Nashville shows because of throat problems, which couldn't let her sing. She did not appear at the New Orleans show because she was attending her boyfriend's funeral.

- Valerius (Opening Act, the Netherlands, Belgium, Ireland and France)
- Banda Cine (Opening Act at Brazil)
- Bocatabú (Opening Act at Dominican Republic)
- The Dolly Rockers
- Marilanne (Venezuela)
- Margarita Perez (Panama)
- Tuxido (North America Part 2 and Mexico)
- Demi Lovato (South America, Europe, surprise guest at Toronto)
- Everlife (Special Guests at Nashville)
- Honor Society (North America)
- Jessie James (select dates in North America)
- Jordin Sparks (North America, Mexico)
- McFly (Surprise Guests at London)
- Miley Cyrus (Surprise Guest at Dallas)
- Wonder Girls (North America)
- Girls Can't Catch (United Kingdom)
- Jacopo Sarno (Opening Act at Italy)
- Joy Mendy (Surprise guest at London)

== Set list ==
This set list is from the concert on July 15, 2009, in East Rutherford, New Jersey. It may not represent all concerts for the tour.

1. "Paranoid"
2. "That's Just the Way We Roll"
3. "Poison Ivy"
4. "Hold On"
5. "Play My Music"
6. "Fly with Me"
7. "Black Keys" / "A Little Bit Longer"
8. "Much Better"
9. "Year 3000"
10. "Tonight"
11. "Gotta Find You"
12. "Turn Right" / "When You Look Me in the Eyes"
13. "Sweet Caroline" (Neil Diamond cover)
14. "Live to Party" / "BB Good"
15. "World War III"
16. "Battlefield" (with Jordin Sparks)
17. "Lovebug"
18. "S.O.S."
19. "Burnin' Up"

== Tour dates ==
List of 2009 concerts, showing date, city, country, venue, opening acts, tickets sold, number of available tickets and amount of gross revenue
Date	City	Country	Venue	Opening acts	Attendance	Revenue
May 18, 2009	Lima	Peru	Estadio Nacional	Demi Lovato	79,364 / 82,488	$3,561,903
May 19, 2009	Lima	Peru	Estadio Nacional	Demi Lovato	79,364 / 82,488	$3,561,903
May 20, 2009	Santiago	Chile	Club Hípico de Santiago	Demi Lovato	33,376 / 35,986	$2,627,794
May 21, 2009	Buenos Aires	Argentina	River Plate Stadium	Demi Lovato	43,502 / 52,152	$2,147,864
May 23, 2009	Rio de Janeiro	Brazil	Sambadrome	Demi Lovato; Banda Cine	15,006 / 20,400	$1,329,811
May 24, 2009	São Paulo	Brazil	Morumbi Stadium	Demi Lovato; Banda Cine	34,248 / 40,000	$3,144,418
June 13, 2009	Madrid	Spain	Palacio de Deportes de la Comunidad de Madrid	Demi Lovato	13,449 / 13,449	$864,587
June 14, 2009	Paris	France	Le Zénith	Demi Lovato	6,063 / 6,063	$314,951
June 15, 2009	London	England	Wembley Arena	Demi Lovato	11,183 / 11,183	$478,277
June 20, 2009	Arlington	United States	Cowboys Stadium	Jordin Sparks; Honor Society; Jessie James	—N/a	—N/a
June 22, 2009	Tulsa	United States	BOK Center	Jordin Sparks; Honor Society; Jessie James	—N/a	—N/a
June 24, 2009	Denver	United States	Pepsi Center	Jordin Sparks; Honor Society; Jessie James	—N/a	—N/a
June 26, 2009	Nampa	United States	Idaho Center	Jordin Sparks; Honor Society; Jessie James	—N/a	—N/a
June 27, 2009	Portland	United States	Rose Garden	Jordin Sparks; Honor Society; Wonder Girls	—N/a	—N/a
June 28, 2009	Tacoma	United States	Tacoma Dome	Jordin Sparks; Honor Society; Jessie James; Wonder Girls	—N/a	—N/a
June 29, 2009	Vancouver	Canada	General Motors Place	Jordin Sparks; Honor Society	32,155 / 37,000	$1,901,745
June 30, 2009	Vancouver	Canada	General Motors Place	Jordin Sparks; Honor Society	32,155 / 37,000	$1,901,745
July 2, 2009	Edmonton	Canada	Rexall Place	Jordin Sparks; Honor Society; Wonder Girls	16,374 / 16,374	$1,152,769
July 4, 2009	Provo	United States	Stadium of Fire	Jordin Sparks; Honor Society; Wonder Girls	—N/a	—N/a
July 5, 2009	Winnipeg	Canada	MTS Centre	Jordin Sparks; Honor Society; Wonder Girls	14,348 / 14,348	$1,015,616
July 7, 2009	Omaha	United States	Qwest Center	Jordin Sparks; Honor Society; Wonder Girls	15,196 / 17,146	$825,753
July 8, 2009	Minneapolis	United States	Target Center	Jordin Sparks; Wonder Girls	17,354 / 18,331	$1,095,271
July 9, 2009	Milwaukee	United States	Bradley Center	Jordin Sparks; Wonder Girls	17,180 / 17,681	$1,003,070
July 10, 2009	Rosemont	United States	Allstate Arena	Jordin Sparks; Honor Society	35,820 / 35,820	$2,498,080
July 11, 2009	Rosemont	United States	Allstate Arena	Jordin Sparks; Honor Society	35,820 / 35,820	$2,498,080
July 13, 2009	Washington, D.C.	United States	Verizon Center	Jordin Sparks; Honor Society	18,138 / 18,138	$1,175,380
July 14, 2009	East Rutherford	United States	Izod Center	Jordin Sparks; Honor Society; Wonder Girls	39,464 / 39,464	$2,421,387
July 15, 2009	East Rutherford	United States	Izod Center	Jordin Sparks; Honor Society; Wonder Girls	39,464 / 39,464	$2,421,387
July 17, 2009	Boston	United States	TD Garden	Jordin Sparks; Honor Society; Wonder Girls	—N/a	—N/a
July 18, 2009	Boston	United States	TD Garden	Jordin Sparks; Honor Society; Wonder Girls	—N/a	—N/a
July 19, 2009	Uniondale	United States	Nassau Coliseum	Jordin Sparks; Honor Society; Wonder Girls	50,153 / 50,153	$2,981,027
July 20, 2009	Uniondale	United States	Nassau Coliseum	Jordin Sparks; Honor Society	50,153 / 50,153	$2,981,027
July 21, 2009	Uniondale	United States	Nassau Coliseum	Jordin Sparks; Honor Society	50,153 / 50,153	$2,981,027
July 23, 2009	Philadelphia	United States	Wachovia Center	Jordin Sparks; Honor Society	38,488 / 38,488	$2,865,222
July 24, 2009	Philadelphia	United States	Wachovia Center	Jordin Sparks; Honor Society	38,488 / 38,488	$2,865,222
July 25, 2009	Pittsburgh	United States	Mellon Arena	Jordin Sparks; Honor Society	17,144 / 17,144	$1,034,387
July 26, 2009	Auburn Hills	United States	The Palace of Auburn Hills	Jordin Sparks; Honor Society; Wonder Girls	19,756 / 19,756	$1,305,634
July 28, 2009	St. Louis	United States	Scottrade Center	Jordin Sparks; Honor Society; Wonder Girls	18,425 / 18,425	$1,105,456
July 29, 2009	Kansas City	United States	Sprint Center	Jordin Sparks; Honor Society; Wonder Girls	17,253 / 17,253	$1,175,369
July 31, 2009	Monterrey	Mexico	Arena Monterrey	Jordin Sparks; Demi Lovato	—N/a	—N/a
August 1, 2009	Paradise	United States	Mandalay Bay Events Center	Jordin Sparks; Demi Lovato	10,694 / 10,694	$920,722
August 3, 2009	San Jose	United States	HP Pavilion at San Jose	Jordin Sparks; Honor Society	17,455 / 17,455	$1,204,855
August 4, 2009	Sacramento	United States	ARCO Arena	Jordin Sparks; Honor Society	15,704 / 15,704	$1,072,235
August 5, 2009	Fresno	United States	Save Mart Center	Jordin Sparks; Honor Society; Wonder Girls	14,381 / 14,381	$857,956
August 7, 2009	Los Angeles	United States	Staples Center	Jordin Sparks; Honor Society	50,150 / 50,150	$3,489,588
August 8, 2009	Los Angeles	United States	Staples Center	Jordin Sparks; Honor Society	50,150 / 50,150	$3,489,588
August 9, 2009	Los Angeles	United States	Staples Center	Jordin Sparks; Honor Society	50,150 / 50,150	$3,489,588
August 11, 2009	Glendale	United States	Jobing.com Arena	Jordin Sparks; Honor Society; Wonder Girls	—N/a	—N/a
August 13, 2009	San Antonio	United States	AT&T Center	Jordin Sparks; Honor Society; Wonder Girls	17,192 / 17,192	$1,106,605
August 14, 2009	Houston	United States	Toyota Center	Jordin Sparks; Honor Society; Wonder Girls	—N/a	—N/a
August 15, 2009	New Orleans	United States	New Orleans Arena	Jordin Sparks; Honor Society; Wonder Girls	16,954 / 16,954	$1,021,803
August 16, 2009	Birmingham	United States	BJCC	Jordin Sparks; Honor Society; Wonder Girls	17,078 / 17,078	$1,025,908
August 18, 2009	Tampa	United States	St. Pete Times Forum	Jordin Sparks; Honor Society; Wonder Girls	—N/a	—N/a
August 19, 2009	Sunrise	United States	BankAtlantic Center	Jordin Sparks; Honor Society; Wonder Girls	—N/a	—N/a
August 21, 2009	Charlotte	United States	Time Warner Cable Arena	Jordin Sparks; Honor Society; Wonder Girls	17,254 / 17,254	$1,081,795
August 22, 2009	Atlanta	United States	Philips Arena	Jordin Sparks; Honor Society; Wonder Girls	17,214 / 17,214	$1,140,990
August 23, 2009	Lexington	United States	Rupp Arena	Jordin Sparks; Honor Society; Wonder Girls	18,852 / 22,477	$1,078,033
August 25, 2009	Nashville	United States	Sommet Center	Everlife; Honor Society; Wonder Girls	15,928 / 15,928	$1,010,685
August 26, 2009	Columbus	United States	Nationwide Arena	Jordin Sparks; Honor Society	17,429 / 18,261	$1,003,096
August 27, 2009	Cleveland	United States	Quicken Loans Arena	Jordin Sparks; Honor Society	19,060 / 19,574	$1,227,208
August 29, 2009	Montreal	Canada	Bell Centre	Jordin Sparks; Honor Society	19,127 / 20,232	$1,311,021
August 30, 2009	Toronto	Canada	Rogers Centre	Jordin Sparks; Honor Society; Wonder Girls	55,156 / 55,156	$3,382,171
August 31, 2009	Ottawa	Canada	Scotiabank Place	Jordin Sparks; Honor Society; Wonder Girls	16,339 / 17,465	$1,087,634
October 9, 2009	Uncasville	United States	Mohegan Sun Arena	Jordin Sparks; Honor Society; Wonder Girls	—N/a	—N/a
October 10, 2009	Uncasville	United States	Mohegan Sun Arena	Jordin Sparks; Honor Society; Wonder Girls	—N/a	—N/a
October 25, 2009	Santo Domingo	Dominican Republic	Estadio Olímpico Félix Sánchez	Bocatabú	—N/a	—N/a
October 27, 2009	Caracas	Venezuela	Hipodromo La Rinconada	Marilanne	12,256 / 20,000	$1,716,240
October 28, 2009	Panama City	Panama	Figali Convention Center	Margarita Perez	5,799 / 8,700	$736,947
October 30, 2009	Guadalajara	Mexico	Estadio 3 de Marzo	Tuxido	—N/a	—N/a
October 31, 2009	Mexico City	Mexico	Foro Sol	Tuxido	—N/a	—N/a
November 3, 2009	Milan	Italy	Mediolanum Forum	Jacopo Sarno	—N/a	—N/a
November 4, 2009	Pesaro	Italy	Adriatic Arena	Jacopo Sarno	—N/a	—N/a
November 6, 2009	Turin	Italy	Palasport Olimpico	Jacopo Sarno	—N/a	—N/a
November 10, 2009	Bilbao	Spain	Bizkaia Arena	—N/a	—N/a	—N/a
November 11, 2009	Madrid	Spain	Palacio de Deportes	—N/a	—N/a	—N/a
November 13, 2009	Rotterdam	Netherlands	Rotterdam Ahoy	Valerius	—N/a	—N/a
November 14, 2009	Antwerp	Belgium	Sportpaleis	Valerius	—N/a	—N/a
November 15, 2009	Cologne	Germany	Palladium	—N/a	—N/a	—N/a
November 17, 2009	Birmingham	England	LG Arena	Girls Can't Catch	—N/a	—N/a
November 18, 2009	Newcastle	England	Metro Radio Arena	Girls Can't Catch	—N/a	—N/a
November 20, 2009	London	England	Wembley Arena	Girls Can't Catch	—N/a	—N/a
November 21, 2009	London	England	Wembley Arena	Girls Can't Catch	—N/a	—N/a
November 22, 2009	Manchester	England	MEN Arena	Girls Can't Catch	—N/a	—N/a
November 24, 2009	Dublin	Ireland	The O2	Valerius	—N/a	—N/a
November 26, 2009	Paris	France	Palais Omnisports de Paris-Bercy	Valerius	15,452 / 16,447	$968,041
December 13, 2009 (Note: The concert of December 13, 2009 at the José Miguel Agrelot Coliseum in San Juan was originally scheduled to take place on October 24, 2009, but was postponed due to "production delays")	San Juan	Puerto Rico	José Miguel Agrelot Coliseum	—N/a	—N/a	—N/a
Total					962,913 / 1,015,558	$61,841,51

== Cancelled shows ==
Date	City	Country	Venue	Reason
November 7, 2009	Zürich	Switzerland	Hallenstadion	Nick Jonas suffering an upper respiratory infection
