= Music from Chasing Happiness =

Greatest hits album by Jonas Brothers
- Released: May 9, 2019
- Recorded: 2005–2019
- Genre: Pop; pop rock
- Length: 46:24
- Label: Republic

Jonas Brothers chronology
LiVe (2013)	Music from Chasing Happiness (2019)	Happiness Begins (2019)

Music from Chasing Happiness is the first greatest hits album and third soundtrack album by American pop rock band Jonas Brothers. It was released on May 9, 2019, through Republic Records. It contains sixteen of their hit singles recorded throughout their career, as well as hits from Nick Jonas's solo venture, his side band Nick Jonas & the Administration, Joe Jonas's solo venture as well as his other band, DNCE.

The album was released to accompany the Amazon Prime Video documentary of the same name, which follows the band during their 2019 reunion and chronicles their lives through the band's break up and the creative process of developing their then-upcoming album, Happiness Begins.

On July 12, 2019, a physical version was released exclusively through Amazon. This version contains an original song, Jersey, and a live rendition of their number one hit Sucker.

== Background ==
The compilation was released as a companion for the Jonas Brothers' Amazon Prime Original Film, Chasing Happiness. It was made available on CD, streaming services and digital download one month before the documentary's release, on June 4, 2019.

== Release ==
The album was initially released as a fifteen-track streaming and digital exclusive, with its release preceding the homonymous documentary. On July 12, 2019, it was reissued on digital platforms, in addition to a physical version on CD being released on the same day.

== Track listing ==
Music from Chasing Happiness track listing
No.	Title	Writer(s)	Original album	Length
1.	"Please Be Mine"	Nicholas Jonas; Joseph Jonas; Kevin Jonas	It's About Time (2006)	3:13
2.	"S.O.S"	N. Jonas	Jonas Brothers (2007)	2:33
3.	"Mandy"	N. Jonas; J. Jonas; K. Jonas	It's About Time	2:48
4.	"Year 3000"	James Bourne; Mattie Jay; Charlie Simpson; Steve Robson; Graham Jay	It's About Time	3:21
5.	"Hold On"	N. Jonas; J. Jonas; K. Jonas	Jonas Brothers	2:45
6.	"Lovebug"	N. Jonas; J. Jonas; K. Jonas	A Little Bit Longer (2008)	3:40
7.	"Burnin' Up"	N. Jonas; J. Jonas; K. Jonas	A Little Bit Longer	2:54
8.	"I Am What I Am"	Adam Schlesinger	It's About Time	2:10
9.	"6 Minutes"	Joe Belmaati; Kenny Gioia; Mich Hansen; Rich Cronin; Sheppard Goodman	It's About Time	3:06
10.	"Goodnight and Goodbye"	N. Jonas; J. Jonas; K. Jonas	Jonas Brothers	2:31
11.	"Video Girl"	N. Jonas; J. Jonas; K. Jonas	A Little Bit Longer	2:53
12.	"Rose Garden"	N. Jonas	Who I Am (2010)	3:34
13.	"Just in Love"	J. Jonas; James Fauntleroy II; LaShawn Daniels; Robin Tadross	Fastlife (2011)	3:27
14.	"Cake By The Ocean"	J. Jonas; Justin Tranter; Mattias Larsson; Robin Fredriksson	DNCE (2016)	3:39
15.	"Jealous"	N. Jonas; Simon Wilcox; Nolan Lambroza	Nick Jonas (2014)	3:43
Total length:				46:24

Physical edition and digital reissue track listing
No.	Title	Writer(s)	Producer(s)	Length
11.	"Jersey"	N. Jonas; J. Jonas; K. Jonas; Jason Evigan	Previously unreleased	3:12
17.	"Sucker" (live version)	N. Jonas; J. Jonas; K. Jonas; Ryan Tedder; Adam Feeney; Louis Bell	Happiness Begins (2019)	3:01
Total length:				52:00

Notes

- "Year 3000" is a cover of English pop-punk band Busted.
- "6 Minutes" is a cover of American pop and hip-hop band LFO.
- "Just in Love" features uncredited guest appearance from American rapper Lil Wayne.

== Charts ==
Weekly chart performance for Music from Chasing Happiness
Chart (2019)	Peak position
Irish Albums (IRMA)	70
