= List of Jonas Brothers concert tours =

The following is a list of tours by the Jonas Brothers.

== Fall 2005 Promo Tour ==
Fall 2005 Promo Tour
- Promotional tour by Jonas Brothers
- Location: U.S., North America
- Associated album: It's About Time
- Start date: November 5, 2005
- End date: December 17, 2005
- Legs: 1
- No. of shows: 16

Jonas Brothers concert chronology
- Jonas Brothers Fall 2005 Promo Tour (2005); American Club Tour (2006)

The Fall 2005 Promo Tour was the Jonas Brothers first tour, to promote their debut album It's About Time. It began on November 5, 2005, and ended on December 17, 2005. The tour also became a part of The Cheetah-licious Christmas Tour, as the Jonas Brothers were surprise guests who opened for both The Cheetah Girls and Aly & AJ for a total of 10 dates, while on this tour.

=== Tour dates ===
Date	City	Country	Venue
North America
November 8, 2005	Boston	United States	Middle East
November 10, 2005	Philadelphia	United States	North Star
November 12, 2005	Bay Shore	United States	Boulton Center for Performing Arts
November 20, 2005	Montclair	United States	Bloomfield Ave. Cafe
November 26, 2005	Hartford	United States	Webster Underground
November 27, 2005	Asbury Park	United States	The Stone Pony
December 6, 2005	Newark	United States	Performing Arts Center
December 7, 2005	Syracuse	United States	Landmark Theater
December 9, 2005	Albany	United States	Palace Theatre
December 10, 2005	Providence	United States	Providence Performing Arts Center
December 11, 2005	Reading	United States	Sovereign Performing Arts Center
December 12, 2005	Toms River	United States	Ritacco Center
December 13, 2005	Boston	United States	Orpheum Theatre
December 14, 2005	Philadelphia	United States	Kimmel Center
December 15, 2005	Wallingford	United States	Chevrolet Theatre
December 17, 2005	New York City	United States	Nokia Theatre Times Square

== American Club Tour ==
American Club Tour
- National tour by Jonas Brothers
- Location: U.S., North America
- Associated album: It's About Time
- Start date: January 28, 2006
- End date: March 3, 2006
- Legs: 1
- No. of shows: 28

Jonas Brothers concert chronology
- Fall 2005 Promo Tour (2005); American Club (2006); Marvelous Party Tour (2007)

The American Club Tour was the second concert tour of American boy band Jonas Brothers, launched in support of their debut album, It's About Time. Most of the tour was held in clubs and very small venues, as the band was not very well known at the time; relating with the equally young artist, Jen Marks. The tour began on January 28, 2006, in Roseville, and ended on March 3, 2006, in Orlando; comprising 28 dates.

=== Set list ===
1. "Mandy"
2. "Time for Me to Fly"
3. "Underdog"
4. "One Day at a Time"
5. "7:05"

=== Tour dates ===
Date	City	Country	Venue
North America
January 28, 2006	Roseville	United States	Underground Cafe
January 30, 2006	Seattle	United States	EC's Auditorium
January 31, 2006	Portland	United States	Room 304
February 2, 2006	Fort Collins	United States	The Starlight
February 3, 2006	Denver	United States	Rock Island
February 4, 2006	Kansas City	United States	Uptown Theater
February 5, 2006	Columbia	United States	Mojo's
February 6, 2006	Minneapolis	United States	7th Street Entry
February 8, 2006	Chicago	United States	Beat Kitchen
February 9, 2006	Indianapolis	United States	The Emerson Theater
February 11, 2006	Columbus	United States	The Basement
February 12, 2006	Buffalo	United States	Town Ballroom
February 14, 2006	New York City	United States	Avalon
February 15, 2006	Boston	United States	The Palladium
February 16, 2006	Providence	United States	Living Room
February 17, 2006	Hartford	United States	Webster Theater
February 18, 2006	Washington, D.C.	United States	9:30 Club
February 20, 2006	Philadelphia	United States	North Star
February 21, 2006	Wilkes-Barre	United States	Wilkes-Barre High School
February 23, 2006	Charlotte	United States	Tremont
February 24, 2006	Norfolk	United States	Norva Theatre
February 25, 2006	Charleston	United States	Music Farm
February 27, 2006	Nashville	United States	3rd & Lindsley
February 28, 2006	Atlanta	United States	Atlanta Masquerade
March 1, 2006	Gainesville	United States	Common Grounds
March 2, 2006	Winter Park	United States	State Theatre
March 3, 2006	Orlando	United States	Back Booth

== Marvelous Party Tour ==
Marvelous Party Tour
- National tour by Jonas Brothers
- Location: North America
- Associated album: Jonas Brothers
- Start date: June 25, 2007
- End date: October 21, 2007
- Legs: 3
- No. of shows: 46

Jonas Brothers concert chronology
- American Club Tour (2006); Marvelous Party Tour (2007); When You Look Me in the Eyes Tour (2008)

The Marvelous Party Tour (often called the Prom Tour) was the third concert tour of American boy band Jonas Brothers, launched to promote their second album, Jonas Brothers. The tour contained decorations such as photo booths to add realism to the prom theme. It began on June 25, 2007, and ended on October 21, 2007. It lasted for a total of 46 dates, making it their third longest tour.

=== Set list ===
1. "Kids of the Future"
2. "Mandy"
3. "Just Friends"
4. "Goodnight And Goodbye"
5. "Hello Beautiful"
6. "Australia"
7. "What I Go to School For"
8. "That's Just The Way We Roll"
9. "Hollywood"
10. "Inseparable"
11. "Still in Love With You"
12. "Hold On"
13. "S.O.S."
14. "Year 3000"

=== Tour dates ===
List of 2007 concerts
Date	City	Country	Venue
June 23, 2007	Winter Haven	United States	Cypress Gardens
June 24, 2007	Hershey	United States	Hersheypark Amphitheatre
June 25, 2007	Lodi	United States	Felician College
June 27, 2007	Nashville	United States	Ryman Auditorium
June 28, 2007	Eureka	United States	Six Flags St. Louis
June 29, 2007 (Note: Part of Alameda County Fair.)	Pleasanton	United States	Alameda County Fairgrounds
June 30, 2007 (Note: Part of San Diego County Fair.)	Del Mar	United States	Del Mar Fairgrounds
July 2, 2007	Cleveland	United States	House of Blues
July 5, 2007	Jackson	United States	Six Flags Great Adventure
July 6, 2007	Cohasset	United States	South Shore Music Circus
July 7, 2007	Westbury	United States	North Fork Theatre
July 9, 2007	North Myrtle Beach	United States	House of Blues
July 11, 2007	Savannah	United States	Johnny Mercer Theatre
July 12, 2007	Austell	United States	Six Flags Over Georgia
July 13, 2007	Bessemer	United States	Alabama Adventure
July 14, 2007	Baton Rouge	United States	Dixie Landin Theme Park
July 15, 2007	Gurnee	United States	Six Flags Great America
July 16, 2007	Albuquerque	United States	Kiva Auditorium
July 17, 2007	Tempe	United States	Marquee Theatre
July 19, 2007 (Note: Part of Sonoma County Fair.)	Santa Rosa	United States	Sonoma County Fairgrounds
July 21, 2007	Stillwater	United States	Lumberjack Days
July 22, 2007	Stillwater	United States	Radio Disney Parade
July 24, 2007	Tulsa	United States	Tulsa Performing Arts Center
July 26, 2007	Corpus Christi	United States	Selena Auditorium
July 28, 2007	Readington	United States	Festival of Ballooning
July 29, 2007	Philadelphia	United States	Penn's Landing Great Plaza
July 30, 2007 (Note: Part of California Mid-State Fair.)	Paso Robles	United States	Paso Robles Event Center
July 31, 2007	West Hollywood	United States	The Roxy Theatre
August 2, 2007	Mitchellville	United States	Six Flags America
August 3, 2007	Providence	United States	Lupo's
August 4, 2007	Uncasville	United States	Mohegan Sun Arena
August 5, 2007	Atlantic City	United States	The Walk
August 6, 2007	New York City	United States	Gramercy Theatre
August 7, 2007	New York City	United States	Gramercy Theatre
August 9, 2007	Agawam	United States	Six Flags New England
August 11, 2007	Sparta	United States	Kentucky Speedway
August 13, 2007 (Note: Part of Altamont Fair.)	Indianapolis	United States	Hoosier Lottery Grandstand
August 14, 2007	Greensburg	United States	Palace Theater
August 16, 2007	Poughkeepsie	United States	The Chance
August 17, 2007 (Note: Part of Altamont Fair.)	Altamont	United States	Altamont Fairgrounds
August 19, 2007	San Juan	Puerto Rico	Luis A. Ferré Performing Arts Center
August 21, 2007	Orlando	United States	House of Blues
August 23, 2007	Ocean Grove	United States	Bash at the Beach
September 1, 2007	Valdosta	United States	Wild Adventures
September 23, 2007 (Note: Part of Puyallup Fair.)	Puyallup	United States	The Puyallup Fair and Events Center
October 7, 2007 (Note: Part of Virginia State Fair.)	Mechanicsville	United States	Virginia State Fairgrounds
October 8, 2007 (Note: Part of State Fair of Texas.)	Dallas	United States	Fair Park
October 9, 2007 (Note: Part of Southern California Fair.)	Perris	United States	Lake Perris Fairgrounds
October 14, 2007 (Note: Part of Georgia National Fair.)	Perry	United States	Georgia National Fairgrounds and Agricenter
October 15, 2007 (Note: Part of South Carolina State Fair.)	Columbia	United States	South Carolina State Fairgrounds

== When You Look Me in the Eyes Tour ==
The When You Look Me in the Eyes Tour (also referred as the Look Me in the Eyes Tour and sometimes stylized as the WYLMITE Tour), is the fourth tour by the Jonas Brothers and their second tour to promote their self-titled studio album. It started on January 31, 2008, and ended on March 22, 2008.

== The Burning Up Tour ==
The Burning Up Tour was the fifth concert tour by the Jonas Brothers. This tour was to promote their third album A Little Bit Longer. This tour had also promoted the Disney Channel Original Movie, Camp Rock in which the Jonas Brothers had starred. Also, the Burning Up Tour was used to promote Disney starlet, Demi Lovato's music. The tour had started on July 4, 2008, in Toronto, and concluded on March 22, 2009, in San Juan.

== World Tour 2009 ==
The Jonas Brothers World Tour 2009 was the sixth concert tour and third headlining tour by the Jonas Brothers, promoting their fourth studio album Lines, Vines and Trying Times. It began on May 18, 2009, in Lima, Peru and ended on December 13, 2009, in San Juan, Puerto Rico.

== Live in Concert ==
The Jonas Brothers: Live in Concert was the seventh concert tour by American pop rock band, the Jonas Brothers to promote on their fourth studio album Lines, Vines and Trying Times and the soundtrack to their Disney Channel show Jonas. The tour started on August 7, 2010, in Tinley Park, Illinois, and ended on November 18, 2010, in Abu Dhabi. The tour included cities in the United States, Canada, the Caribbean, Mexico, Central America, South America, and Middle East. The brothers were accompanied by Demi Lovato and the cast of Camp Rock 2: The Final Jam to promote their albums Here We Go Again and Camp Rock 2: The Final Jam respectively.

== Jonas Brothers World Tour 2012/2013 ==
The Jonas Brothers World Tour 2012/2013 is the eighth concert tour by the Jonas Brothers, which promoted their originally-planned fifth studio album V that was ultimately cancelled. Three new songs from the original project were performed on the tour: "Let's Go", "Wedding Bells" and "First Time".

== Live 2013 ==
The Jonas Brothers Live 2013 is the ninth concert tour by American pop/rock band, the Jonas Brothers before their split on October 29, 2013. This tour included cities in the United States and Canada to promote their unreleased album V after their fourth studio album Lines, Vines and Trying Times (2009).

On October 9, 2013, the group cancelled their highly anticipated comeback tour days before it was slated to start, citing a "deep rift within the band" over "creative differences", later announcing their break-up as a band on October 29, 2013. After their split, the band released their second live album after the tour ended, which is composed of live performances from their Los Angeles and Uncasville shows and five original studio recordings that would've been on the V album.

== Happiness Begins Tour ==
Happiness Begins Tour was the tenth concert tour by the Jonas Brothers, in promotion of their fifth studio album, Happiness Begins, and their first one since reuniting after their 2013 separation. The tour began on August 7, 2019, in Miami, Florida, at the American Airlines Arena and concluded on February 22, 2020, in Paris at the AccorHotels Arena.

== Remember This Tour ==
The Remember This Tour was the eleventh concert tour by the Jonas Brothers. The tour began in Las Vegas at the Park Theater and concluded in Mexico City at the Arena Monterrey and consisted of 52 shows.

== Jonas Brothers on Broadway ==
Jonas Brothers on Broadway was the fourth concert residency by American pop rock band Jonas Brothers. performed at Marquis Theatre, a Broadway theater on the third floor of the New York Marriott Marquis hotel in the Theater District of Midtown Manhattan in New York City, United States. The residency opened on March 14, and ended on March 18, 2023, with each night being focused on one of the band's previous albums: Jonas Brothers (2007), A Little Bit Longer (2008), Lines, Vines and Trying Times (2009), Happiness Begins (2019) and The Album (2023).

== Five Albums. One Night. The World Tour ==
The Five Albums. One Night. The World Tour (also referred as The World Tour or simply The Tour) was the twelfth concert tour by American pop rock band Jonas Brothers, in promotion of their sixth studio album, The Album (2023), as well as their albums from Jonas Brothers (2007) until Happiness Begins (2019). It began on August 12, 2023, in New York City, New York, and concluded on October 16, 2024, in Krakow, Poland.

== Jonas20: Greetings from Your Hometown Tour ==
Jonas20: Greetings from Your Hometown Tour was the thirteenth concert tour by American pop rock band Jonas Brothers, in celebration of the band's 20th anniversary. The tour began on August 10, 2025, with a concert at the MetLife Stadium, in New Jersey, the band's home state.
