= Live (Jonas Brothers album) =

2013 live album by Jonas Brothers

LiVe

Live album by Jonas Brothers
- Released: November 26, 2013
- Recorded: July 23–August 16, 2013
- Venues: Mohegan Sun Arena (Uncasville); Gibson Amphitheatre (Los Angeles)
- Genre: Pop
- Length: 53:31
- Label: Jonas
- Producer: Nick Jonas

Jonas Brothers chronology
Jonas L.A. (2010)	LiVe (2013)	Music from Chasing Happiness (2019)

Singles from LiVe
- 1. "Pom Poms" Released: April 2, 2013; 2. "First Time" Released: June 25, 2013

LiVe is the second live album by American pop rock band Jonas Brothers, released on November 26, 2013, in the US exclusively on their website. The record marks their last release as a band before their break-up in 2013.

The album was stylized with an uppercase "V" for the number five in the Roman numeral, a reference to the original cancelled fifth studio album that was due for release in late 2013. It was recorded between July 23 and August 16, 2013, at Mohegan Sun Arena and Gibson Amphitheatre during their final tour before the band's breakup.

== Background ==
In August 2012, the Jonas Brothers announced a reunion to release a fifth album. On October 3, 2012, a preview of the song "Meet You In Paris" was released on Cambio. On October 11, 2012, at Radio City Music Hall in New York City, where they performed several songs from their previous albums along with a new song entitled "Let's Go", intended to be on their fifth studio album. During the reunion concert, they also performed a new song entitled "Wedding Bells". Another new song, entitled "First Time" was also debuted during the reunion concert. On October 29, 2012, it was announced that the Jonas Brothers would hold two concerts at the Pantages Theatre in Los Angeles. A third date was announced on November 2, 2012. The concerts took place on November 27, 28, and 29, 2012, respectively. They performed at Jingle Ball at L.A. Live on December 1, 2012, and announced several tour dates to take place in South America in February and March 2013 as part of their 2012/2013 World Tour, their first concert tour since the 2010 World Tour. They performed at the Viña del Mar International Song Festival on February 28, 2013, in Chile.

== Development ==
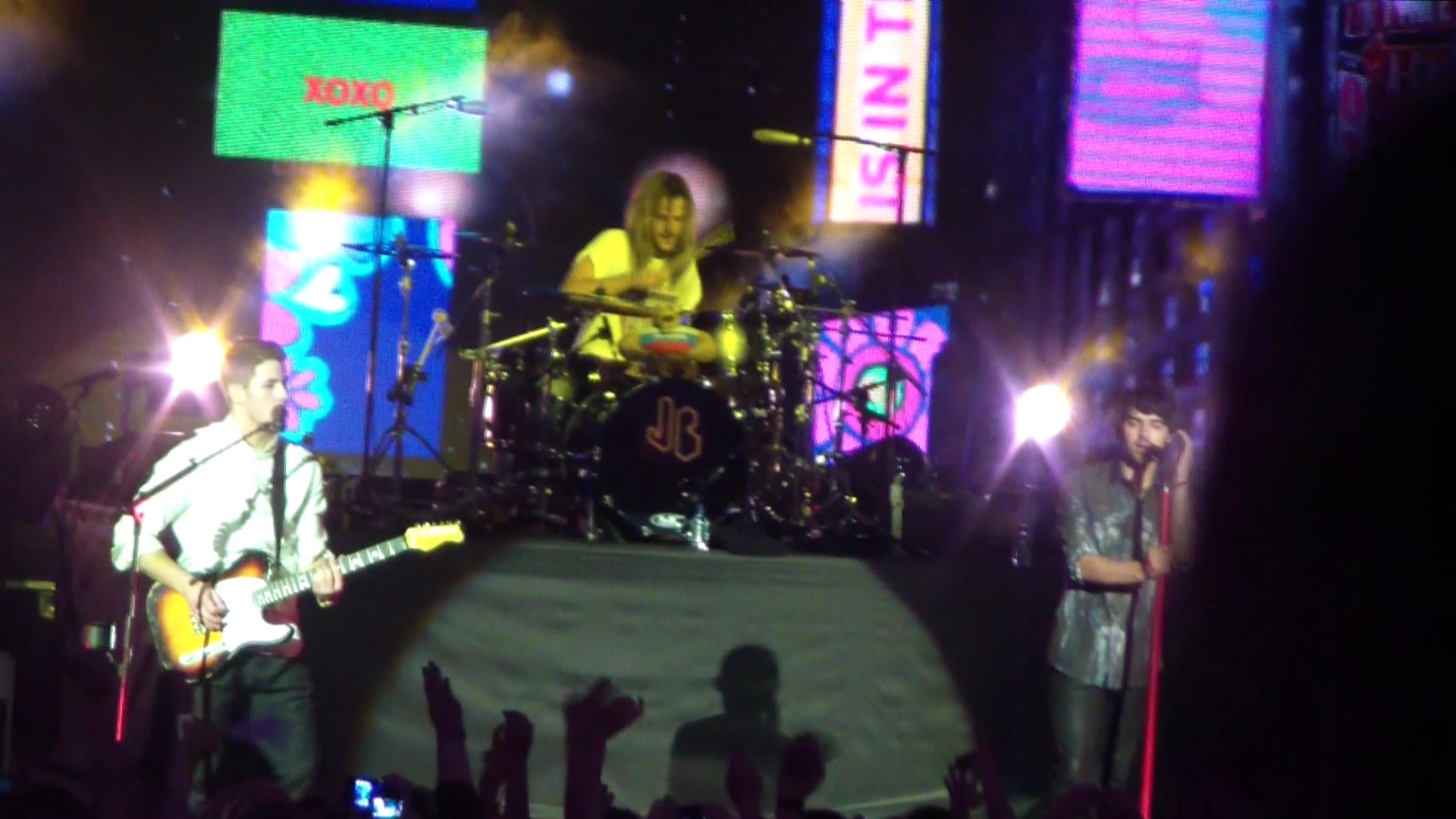
Jonas Brothers performing in Moscow, November 2012

Their fifth studio album, which would have been their first not to be released through Hollywood Records since 2006 and their first record since 2009's Lines, Vines and Trying Times, was scheduled to be released in 2013. The lead single, "Pom Poms" was released on April 2, 2013. The music video for the song was filmed in February 2013 in New Orleans, Louisiana and premiered on E! on April 2, 2013. "First Time", the second single from their fifth album, was released on June 25, 2013. On July 10, 2013, the group announced that their fifth studio album would be titled V (pronounced: Five), the Roman numeral for five.

On October 9, 2013, the group cancelled their highly anticipated comeback tour days before it was slated to start, citing a "deep rift within the band" over "creative differences". Following the tour cancellation, the Jonas Brothers' Twitter page went offline and the brothers' individual accounts became temporarily obsolete; causing several media outlets to report that a break-up was imminent. On October 29, 2013, the Jonas Brothers officially confirmed their split and announced that the release of V had been cancelled. During an interview, Nick Jonas stated that the album wouldn't be released but decided to release 16 recordings to their Team Jonas fan club members. "We want to do something special for our fans because they've been so supportive of us for so many years. What we've decided to do is package an album with 10 live tracks from the summer tour and four of the songs that would have been on 'V', and if you count 'Pom Poms' and 'First Time', it's actually 6 songs that would have been on 'V'. We’ll be sending that out soon for the fans." The album was released with the title "LiVe", spelled with the letter "V" capitalized, a reference to the original project, the cancelled fifth studio album.

After the band returned in 2019, the Jonas Brothers released the original project "V" in full as an LP through their merchandise website, which contains ten tracks, four of which were previously unreleased.

== Track listing ==
All tracks are produced by Nick Jonas.

=== LiVe track listing ===
2013 digital release
No.	Title	Writer(s)	Length
1.	"First Time"	Nicholas Jonas; Joseph Jonas; Kevin Jonas II; Paul Shelton III	4:54
2.	"Paranoid"	N. Jonas; J. Jonas; K. Jonas; Cathy Dennis; John Fields	4:08
3.	"Pom Poms"	N. Jonas; J. Jonas; K. Jonas; Shelton	3:33
4.	"World War III"	N. Jonas	3:29
5.	"Thinking Bout You"	Christopher Breaux; Robert Taylor	2:21
6.	"A Little Bit Longer"	N. Jonas	2:59
7.	"When You Look Me in the Eyes"	N. Jonas; J. Jonas; K. Jonas; Kevin Jonas Sr.; PJ Bianco; Raymond Boyd	4:15
8.	"Burnin' Up"	N. Jonas; J. Jonas; K. Jonas	3:11
9.	"Lovebug"	N. Jonas; J. Jonas; K. Jonas	4:18
10.	"S.O.S"	N. Jonas	3:46
11.	"Neon"	N. Jonas; J. Jonas; Shelton	3:36
12.	"The World"	N. Jonas; J. Jonas; Shelton	2:35
13.	"Wedding Bells"	N. Jonas; J. Jonas; Shelton	4:04
14.	"What Do I Mean"	N. Jonas; Shelton	3:23
Total length:			53:31

Notes

- "Thinking Bout You" is a cover of American singer Frank Ocean's song of the same name.
- Tracks 1–6, 8–10 are subtitled "Live, Los Angeles, 2013" and track 7 is subtitled "Live, Uncasville, 2013".
- Tracks 11–14 are studio recordings.

=== V track listing ===
Side A — 2019 vinyl release
No.	Title	Writer(s)	Length
1.	"Pom Poms"	Nicholas Jonas; Joseph Jonas; Kevin Jonas II; Paul Shelton III	3:18
2.	"Wedding Bells"	N. Jonas; J. Jonas; Shelton	4:04
3.	"Mr. Nice Guy"	N. Jonas; J. Jonas; K. Jonas; Shelton	3:21
4.	"Neon"	N. Jonas; J. Jonas; Shelton	3:35
5.	"First Time"	N. Jonas; J. Jonas; K. Jonas; Shelton	3:49
Total length:			14:18

Side B
No.	Title	Writer(s)	Length
1.	"Let's Go" (featuring Karmin)	N. Jonas; J. Jonas; K. Jonas; Shelton	3:38
2.	"What Do I Mean"	N. Jonas; Shelton	3:23
3.	"Don't Say"	N. Jonas; J. Jonas; Shelton	4:31
4.	"The World"	N. Jonas; J. Jonas; Shelton	2:34
5.	"Found"	N. Jonas; Greg Garbowsky; Matthew "Mdot" Finley	3:25
Total length:			17:31

Note

- Track 3 (Side A) and tracks 1, 3 and 5 (Side B) are denoted as "previously unreleased".

== Personnel ==
Credits for LiVe:

=== Jonas Brothers ===
- Nick Jonas – vocals, production (all tracks); guitars (1–5, 7, 9–14); keyboards (1, 11, 13, 14); drums (1, 14); piano (6, 12); bass (11–13); all programmed instrumentation [drums, bass, keys] (11–14)
- Joe Jonas – vocals (1–5, 7–12, 14, 15); background vocals (11–14)
- Kevin Jonas – guitars (1–5, 7–14); vocals (1); background vocals (all tracks)

=== Additional contributors ===
- John Taylor – guitar, background vocals (1–5, 8–10)
- Ryan Liestman – keyboards, background vocals (1–5, 8–10)
- Jack Lawless – drums (1–5, 8–10)
- Greg Garbowsky – bass, background vocals (1–5, 8–10)
- Paris Carney-Garbowsky – background vocals (1–5, 8–10)
- Megan Mullins – violin (1–5, 8–10); background vocals (1–5, 8–10)

== Release history ==
LiVe release history
Region	Date	Format(s)	Edition(s)	Label	Ref.
Various	November 26, 2013	Digital download	LiVe	Jonas Enterprises	
United States	June 20, 2019	Vinyl LP	V	Jonas Enterprises	
