= See No More =

Single by Joe Jonas

from the album Fastlife
- Released: June 13, 2011
- Recorded: January – June 2011 in Los Angeles, California
- Genre: Pop; R&B
- Length: 3:52
- Label: Hollywood
- Songwriters: Joe Jonas; Chris Brown; Brian Kennedy
- Producers: Kennedy; Brown

Joe Jonas singles chronology
| "Wouldn't Change a Thing" (2010) | "See No More" (2011) | "Just in Love" (2011) |

Music video
- "See No More" on YouTube

"See No More" is a song by American singer Joe Jonas. The song was released on June 13, 2011, as the first single from his debut album, Fastlife (2011). The mid-tempo pop and R&B song contains usage of synths, has prominent pop rock characteristics and lyrically explains a bad relationship. Most critics complimented See No More as a great start to a solo career, and fantastic lead single. Jonas co-wrote the song with American R&B singer Chris Brown, who also provides backing vocals through the song's chorus.

== Background and composition ==
"See No More"
A 22 second sample of "See No More" by Joe Jonas, where a portion of the chorus is heard.

Joe told Idolator the track, with its dramatic strings, “grabbed [my] heart” when he first heard the basic version, produced by Digging-featured hitmaker Brian Kennedy, who was also behind the boards for such jams as Rihanna’s #1 single “Disturbia,” among others. As he explained to E! News at the 2011 Billboard Music Awards: "The song is about a relationship ending and you’re trying to get over it, but at the same time you’ve got these mixed feelings… you’re fighting everything of seeing that person. It sounds like a sad song, but it carries a cool beat to it".

The song came together last year one day when Joe was working in the studio with Chris Brown (a credited co-writer on the song). Kennedy stopped by the studio, and Brown asked him what new beats he’d had stored on his laptop. Kennedy whipped out the “See No More” track, which he’d built from scratch while working in Nashville. Jonas and Brown went for it instantly. “It was just electric,” Jonas told E!. When [we] asked Kennedy to sum up Joe’s connection with “See No More,” (a club/R&B track that departs quite a bit from his pop-rock days), he told us, “I feel like it matches who he is. It has this confident kind of vibe that’s perfect for him — a guy coming into a man. He’s actually coming into that new sound, it’s natural. It feels honest. It feels believable".

The song is essentially about the memory of a relationship that just won’t quit, and the main hook of ‘See No More,’ co-penned by Chris Brown and Brian Kennedy, is “I don’t wanna wait for you/ I don’t wanna wake up thinking, hoping you’re gonna get it right this time.” He struggles with moving on, crooning “All I keep seeing is your picture / I don’t wanna see no more.” We’ve all been there and can relate. Towards the end of the song, during the bridge, Jonas sings, over a looped beat, “I used to be afraid of letting go / Right now I need you to set me free/ I can see it in your eyes” and “I don’t wanna see no more” as he still tries to expunge his brain from the memory of the one who has inflicted misery on his heart. Joe sings over scattered beeps, cinematic strings and a raspy R&B drumbeat - neatly side-stepping the feather-light pop-rock sound synonymous with his siblings."

== Critical reception ==
Sarah Maloy wrote for Billboard that "See No More" is reminiscent of the Jonas Brothers' "A Little Bit Longer," but with more fear: "It was so easy to trust you baby/Guess I was so stupid baby/ I did not ever think that this would come/ You're running right to another one," Jonas sings. The first taste of debut solo album "Fast Life" may lack depth, but a strong beat and solid vocal performance position the track as a contender for the stuck-in-your-head song of the summer." Amy Sciarretto from Pop Crunch rated it four out of five stars and says that "he has transitioned from middle Jonas Brother to bona fide pop singer a la Justin Timberlake or Jesse McCartney." Sciarretto also praised the song more mature (relatively speaking) R&B sound, while saying that "he is showing off his chops". Lewis Corner editor of Digital Spy also rated it four stars out of five, saying that "the result is a slice of dramatic synth-pop about adolescent anguish that not only serves as a perfectly executed image overhaul, but sets him apart from certain other males currently Ridin' Solo in the charts." TJ wrote for "Neon Limelight" that the song "finds a maturing Joe trying out different vocal approaches, from a tender falsetto, to a full voice (that, at times, sounds painfully whiny)" and that "his solo introduction is passable, but it does not feel authentic." Jamie Peck wrote for MTV Buzzworthy that "it's a much more mature sound than we are used to hearing from him or any of the Jonases, quite frankly. This R&B-inflected track expresses Joe's frustration at having to wait for his beloved to catch up with him, metaphorically speaking."

== Awards and nominations ==
"See No More" was nominated under the title "Choice Music: Break-up Song" in the 2011 Teen Choice Awards.

== Music video ==
Joe Jonas in the music video for 'See No More'.

The official music video for the song premiered on June 29, 2011 on E! News. In the video, he is looking upset over the betrayal he faces at the hands of his object of affection. Joe walks the earth, braves the elements and moves on from a broken heart.

=== Synopsis ===
The "See No More" video begins with a shot of a depressed Joe. Amidst a broken dishes on the floor, Joe skulks about in his empty house. The only remaining piece of furniture is a lone chair, which later supports Joe, as he stops to take a seat and look out the window while presumably fantasizing about happier times. Suddenly, the one who broke his heart is swirling outside in the dark in front of Joe's house wearing a lavender frock. Cut to Joe back inside his house and next the dress catches on fire, serving as the catalyst for the massive blaze which eventually overtakes Joe's sad, memory-filled house. As the video comes to a close, is seeing a still brokenhearted Joe emerging from the wreckage in a symmetrical grey cloud of smoke.

=== Reception ===
Jason Lipshutz wrote for Billboard that in the music video, Joe "flaunts his new maturity and sets fire to a handful of haunting memories."

== Charts ==
| Chart (2011) | Peak position |
|---|---|
| Belgium (Ultratip Bubbling Under Flanders) | 15 |
| Belgium (Ultratip Bubbling Under Wallonia) | 14 |
| UK Singles (Official Charts Company) | 53 |
| US Billboard Hot 100 | 92 |
| US Mainstream Top 40 (Billboard) | 37 |
