= Pom Poms (song) =

Single by Jonas Brothers

from the album Live
- Released: April 2, 2013
- Recorded: 2012
- Genre: Jazz rock
- Length: 3:18
- Label: Jonas
- Songwriter(s): Nick Jonas; Joe Jonas; Kevin Jonas; Paul Phamous
- Producer(s): Nick Jonas

Jonas Brothers singles chronology
"Fly with Me" (2009)	"Pom Poms" (2013)	"First Time" (2013)

Music video
- "Pom Poms" on YouTube

"Pom Poms" is a song recorded by American pop rock band the Jonas Brothers. It was written by Nick Jonas, Joe Jonas, Kevin Jonas and Paul Phamous. The song was released on April 2, 2013, as the lead single from their second live album, Live by Jonas Enterprises. It is the first single not to be released by the trio under their previous label, Hollywood Records.

== Background and composition ==
"Pom Poms"
A 19 second sample of "Pom Poms" by Jonas Brothers, where a portion of the chorus is heard.

During an interview with Ryan Seacrest on February 18, 2013, they revealed that their new single would be Pom Poms; and that they planned on releasing the track sometime this spring.

On March 24, 2013, a snippet of the song and the cover art of their new single was revealed.

The Jonas Brothers were present on On Air with Ryan Seacrest, April 2, and talked about the song, later premiered it for the first time on radio and afterwards talked about other projects and returning on tour in July.

== Critical reception ==
Bill Lamb of About.com gave the song a rating of 4.5 out of 5, praising the "irresistibly addictive pop hook" and "fusion of jazz-rock" of the song.

== Music video ==
On March 26, 2013, a preview of the music video was released online. The sneak peek has Kevin, Nick and Joe jamming in front of some flashy pyrotechnics. A second sneak peek was leaked online on March 27, the sneak peek has girls having fun on a car. Also that same day a third sneak peek released, of the Southern University marching band. A fourth teaser was released on March 29; it shows a little boy getting his drink. The final teaser was released online on March 30, 2013; the teaser shows someone dancing in a tiger suit.

The music video premiered on April 2, 2013, on E!. The music video for the song was directed by Marc Klasfeld and filmed in February 2013 in New Orleans, Louisiana. The trio performed on a high school football field. They were accompanied by Saints and Hornets cheerleaders, the Southern University marching band and a few Jonas Brothers fans. Video Static wrote: "The vibe is fun and the marching band action in the coda is sure to get this track played at every high school football game this autumn."

== Live performances ==
The brothers were scheduled to appear on Late Night with Jimmy Fallon on April 9, 2013 and the Today Show on April 17, 2013. The episode of the Today Show aired on April 25, 2013. They were scheduled to perform the song live on Live! with Kelly and Michael on April 18, 2013. They performed the song again on June 1 during the Acapulco Festival in Mexico. They are set to perform the song in a medley with First Time and as of June 14 a surprise song at the Miss USA 2013 competition. On June 16, it was revealed that the third song was Neon. They performed Pom Poms before First Time and Lovebug on Live Music Day. During the first concert on July 10, they performed the song Pom Poms again.

== Track listing ==
Digital download and streaming
No.	Title	Length
1.	"Pom Poms"	3:18

Canadian digital download and streaming
No.	Title	Length
1.	"Pom Poms (French version)"	3:18

10" vinyl single (Limited edition)
No.	Title	Length
1.	"Pom Poms (English version)"	3:18
2.	"Pom Poms (Spanish version)"	3:18
3.	"Pom Poms (French version)"	3:18
4.	"Pom Poms (Portuguese version)"	3:18

== Chart performance ==
Chart (2013)	Peak position
Belgium (Ultratip Bubbling Under Flanders)	68
Canada (Canadian Hot 100)	57
France (SNEP)	178
Mexico Top Anglo (Monitor Latino)	17
Spain (PROMUSICAE)	48
US Billboard Hot 100	60
Venezuela Pop/Rock General (Record Report)	13

== Release history ==
Region	Date	Format	Label
United States	April 2, 2013	Digital download	Jonas; Universal
Australia	April 2, 2013	Digital download	Jonas; Universal
Canada	April 2, 2013	Digital download	Jonas; Universal
Russia	April 3, 2013	Digital download	Jonas; Universal
The Netherlands	April 3, 2013	Digital download	Jonas; Universal
Germany	April 3, 2013	Digital download	Jonas; Universal
New Zealand	April 3, 2013	Digital download	Jonas; Universal
Canada	April 9, 2013	Digital download (French version)	Jonas; Universal
France	April 10, 2013	Digital download	Jonas; Universal
Spain	April 10, 2013	Digital download	Jonas; Universal
Italy	April 10, 2013	Digital download	Jonas; Universal
Japan	April 10, 2013	Digital download	Jonas; Universal
United Kingdom	July 14, 2013	Digital download	Jonas; Universal
