= Fastlife =

Studio album by Joe Jonas
- Released: October 11, 2011
- Recorded: 2010–2011
- Genres: Pop; electropop; R&B
- Length: 48:52
- Label: Hollywood
- Producers: Adonis; Chris Brown; Danja; Rob Knox; Hit-Boy

Joe Jonas chronology
Fastlife (2011)	Music for People Who Believe in Love (2025)

Singles from Fastlife
- 1. "See No More" Released: June 10, 2011; 2. "Just in Love" Released: September 13, 2011

Fastlife is the debut solo studio album by American recording artist Joe Jonas. The album was released on October 11, 2011, through Hollywood Records. Fastlife serves as Jonas' first album outside of his band Jonas Brothers, which went on hiatus one year prior to its release. Jonas hoped to create a more mature and "electric" sound for the album, a contrast from the pop-rock releases with his band. To achieve this goal, Jonas worked with a range of urban producers such as Danja and Chris Brown, among others. Fastlife lyrically speaks of topics such as love, sex, and breakups. Jonas received co-writer credits for seven songs on the album.

Fastlife received a generally mixed reception from music critics, with the record's production and lyrical themes receiving praise. Along with the album's mixed reviews, the project failed to achieve the commercial success Jonas had seen with his band. Fastlife sold a total of 18,000 copies in its first week of release, reaching number fifteen on the Billboard 200 chart. The album quickly fell off the chart, going on to sell 45,000 copies in the United States by 2015. The album fared similarly worldwide, reaching the lower end of various charts. Following the release of Fastlife, both Jonas and his band parted ways with Hollywood Records, purchasing the rights to their musical releases.

The album was preceded by the release of two singles. "See No More" was released as the lead single from the project in June 2011. The song reached number ninety-two on the Billboard Hot 100 chart. "Just in Love" was released as the album's second single in September, reaching number eighty-five on the official UK singles charts. The song was later remixed to feature rapper Lil Wayne, which was released in October 2011. "Love Slayer" was released as a promotional single for the album, reaching the top ten of the Dance Club Songs chart. Jonas promoted the album through various live performances and interviews.

== Background ==
Joe Jonas first rose to fame as a member of the pop-rock band Jonas Brothers, who made their debut in 2006. The group signed with Hollywood Records in 2007, and released their multi-platinum second studio album that same year. The band became a teen sensation, having a large teenage fan-base and receiving much media attention focused on their personal lives. The brothers participated in many projects with the Disney Channel, including a number of television shows and television films. Jonas had his first solo release with the song "This Is Me" (2008) alongside Demi Lovato. The duet entered the top ten of the Billboard Hot 100 chart and sold over 900,000 copies in the United States alone. He would later collaborate with Lovato again for various Disney projects, as well as the songs "Make a Wave" (2010) and "Wouldn't Change a Thing" (2010). Jonas and Lovato began a romantic relationship, though broke up in 2010. Even though they split, the two continued to tour together until Lovato left due to personal struggles with substance abuse and self-harm.

Jonas began dating actress Ashley Greene during the tour, whom he dated throughout the recording process of Fastlife.

While touring with the Jonas Brothers on their 2010 world tour, Jonas began working on a solo debut album. The project was officially announced on May 19, 2010. The announcement came during the period that fellow Jonas Brothers member Nick Jonas announced his side project, Nick Jonas & the Administration. Jonas claimed that he would not have worked on the album had his brothers not approved of the project. With Joe and Nick both working on solo projects, it was confirmed that the Jonas Brothers would be on an indefinite hiatus, allowing the brothers full freedom to focus on other endeavors. Nick confirmed that the band would reunite at some point, claiming they were "just taking some time to do some individual projects and enjoy that journey that each of us are on. It's exciting, you know, we're all doing different things and kind of taking those experiences and then we'll comeback and do something soon." In March 2011, while Jonas was still working on the project, he and Greene ended their relationship. The relationship and subsequent breakup provided inspiration for some of the lyrics on the album.

== Recording and production ==
In September 2010, a representative for Hollywood Records described the album as having a "dangerous" sound, and likened it to releases from Justin Timberlake. Jonas initially hoped for the record to have a "Hall & Oates meets disco-funk" vibe. During early recording sessions for Fastlife, Joe worked extensively with Robert Coppola Schwartzman on multiple songs, though none of them were released. Jonas would go on to describe the unreleased songs as having a "Freddie Mercury vibe". Schwartzman said the songs had a "retro '80s pop vibe with synthesizers and some electric guitar". Jonas would claim in 2013 that these songs were not used as the label hoped for the album to go in a different direction, hoping to achieve a similar sound to recording artist Justin Timberlake. Reportedly, the label found the tracks for the album to be "weird" and said they "sounded like demos", thus Jonas was told to work with producers who had worked with other Disney acts such as Miley Cyrus and Selena Gomez. Jonas described the early stages of the album as having a Michael Bublé sound, and revealed that two of the original songs were reworked into the finished product. Jonas would neglect to work with the producers the label hoped, instead working with producers such as Danja and Rob Knox on the majority of the project.

Jonas was a fan of Danja's work with artists such as Britney Spears and Mary J. Blige. On working with the producer, Jonas said "I told him that this was the kind of music I wanted to do and the type of album I wanted to create. At the same time I wanted to make something that was my own. We had two days apart and then came back and he presented me with some tracks and they were perfect. He was very easy to work with." Danja sought to make something different for Jonas, saying "There's such a gap between what I do and what the Jonas Brothers are. But that's the excitement -- it left us an opportunity to create something new." He contributed five songs for the album, including "Love Slayer". "Take It and Run" was one of the first songs produced for the project by Danja, and was written by Danja and Kevin Cossom. On the writing process, Danja said "It's Joe's album, it's not just something put together for him. He's collaborating with the writing. He's very different from what you'd expect. All I can say is he's an adult man. He has a rock-star edge about him."

Jonas worked with songwriter Claude Kelly for two days in New York City. Kelly, along with Danja, collaborated with Jonas on the song "Make You Mine". The two claimed to have worked on other songs together, though none of the other songs made the final track list. "Make You Mine" came to fruition after Jonas expressed a desire to create a "Michael Jackson tribute" for the album. Jim Beanz is credited as a producer on four songs for the project. Rob Knox worked with Jonas on three songs for the record, including the album's lead single "See No More" and the title track. Knox was quoted as saying "I look at Joe's scenario as kind of like when Justin Timberlake broke out of 'N Sync. Justin was 21 when he came out as a solo artist. Joe is coming to producers who know how to create that edgier pop feeling. We're not doing any boy-band songs." Jonas recorded a song titled "Black-Light" for the album, though it was not released. He also recorded a song titled "Body Language", which had a Latin feel and lyrically spoke of loving a girl who doesn't speak English. There were rumors of a song titled "Close to You" that featured Chris Brown on guest vocals. Jonas wanted the album's lyrics to be more personal than his releases with Jonas Brothers, stating "When I started writing for the record, I wanted it to be very personal … even though it's scary because it's just [me] by myself. People are going to listen and try to pinpoint what the lyrics are about, but I did my best without saying any names."

Jonas wrote all of the twelve songs featured on the album, including the remix of Just in Love featuring Lil Wayne and citing "Sorry" as the most personal on the album. Joe worked with his brother Nick on songs for the album, though none of them were included on Fastlife. On the process, Joe explained "I actually ended up writing with Nick for his project. At the time I was writing this record, though, he was more focused on doing the stuff he was doing … in London. That took up most of his time, so he wasn't really diving in quite yet with all the writing he's doing now, which has kind of taken over for him." Jonas met Chris Brown through a mutual colleague, with Jonas claiming they decided to work together after playing each other some of their music. The duo collaborated to write the song "See No More", with Brown providing background vocals for the song as well. Brown played Joe the song "Lighthouse", which he had written, and Jonas later recorded it for Fastlife. Hit-Boy is credited as the producer for "Lighthouse". Jonas later claimed to have been inspired by the music Brown played for him, which he claimed was evident in the finished product of Fastlife. The song "Just in Love" was initially announced under the title "Just in Love (With You)" prior to the release of the song. Following the release of "Just in Love", rapper Lil Wayne reached out to Jonas to record a verse for a remix of the song. On the collaboration, Jonas said "He just jumped on the record, and it's just super awesome to see that somebody like him would wanna support me [...] It means the world to me, and I love his rap, it's so dope." The remixed version of "Just in Love" appears as the final track on the album, despite not initially being on the track listing.

== Musical style ==
Jonas hoped to record an album that made people want to dance, and described the finished product as an "upbeat record". The record was seen as a drastic change from his sound with the Jonas Brothers, with Jonas describing Fastlife as "more urban and dance electronic" than the band's music. When asked about the dance elements of the album, Jonas claimed "It's the kind of music that I've always loved. I've always really been into dance music and electro music, and hip-hop music. I've always been sort of intrigued to go on my own path to create something different." The album was also seen as going in an R&B direction, with Jonas citing the genre as an influence for the project. He wanted to create an album that could be played in dance clubs, and began spending time in various clubs to gain inspiration for the album. Jonas said "We'd go out and just experience what every club was about. We'd listen to certain DJs and see how they worked the crowd. It was so new to me. What was so cool was that the music and vibe would vary from city to city - Miami clubs and L.A. clubs are totally different. But with this project, I wanted to find a sound that was universal." Jonas told Entertainment Weekly in February 2010 that the album was not "just a cheesy pop record", and claimed that the album had dance influences. Following the completion of the album, Jonas said the album was more "urban, hip-hop and dance" than his prior releases. He cited Tiësto, Swedish House Mafia, and Deadmau5 as some of the album's inspirations.

The album opens with "All This Time", which Slant Magazine described as a "more full-bodied spin on Nelly Furtado's "Say It Right" (2006). Jonas said the song is about helping a girl "get to a place of love again" and "showing them they can trust you." The Danja produced mid-tempo track has been described as "full of heavy bass and Timbaland-lite rhythms". The second song, "Just in Love", features Latin influences and lyrically speaks of Jonas' love for a girl, boasting the lyrics "Just running from the truth/ That I'm scared of losing you/ You are worth too much to lose/ Baby, even if you're still confused/ Girl I'm just in love with you." Jonas said the song was about the mixed emotions felt while fighting with a lover. The next track, "See No More", was described by Idolator as a "club/R&B track that departs quite a bit from his pop-rock days" and lyrically speaks of memories of a past relationship that don't seem to fade. Lewis Corner of Digital Spy called "See No More" a "slice of dramatic synth-pop about adolescent anguish". Idolator wrote that the fourth song, "Love Slayer", featured "pulsating club beats, [an] array of catchy hooks and [an] anthemic chorus." Jonas claimed the song is about a girl that is the "hottest girl in the room" and will "break your heart". The title track was inspired by Los Angeles, "just the busy city, running around, having fun."

The sixth song, "Make You Mine", sees Jonas taking home a girl from the club, boasting the lyrics "Gonna make you mine tonight/I wanna rock with you 'til sunrise/Let me do all the little things you like." "Sorry", initially referred to as "I'm Sorry", was described as a standout song on the album. Joe was quoted as saying that the ballad was "saying, I screwed up. I didn't cheat on the person, but just I messed up and I wanted the person back. I'm just putting it all on the table saying, 'I'm sorry. I wish I could have you back.'" "Kleptomaniac" sees Jonas singing of a girl who steals hearts, with lyrics such as "She's a kleptomaniac/She'll steal your heart and soul". The song features dubstep elements, and has been described as "dancefloor ready". "Not Right Now" is primarily an R&B song that has been described as "melancholy" and having elements of rock music. Lyrically, the track speaks of Jonas' desire to go back to the good times of a now-sour relationship. "Take It and Run" is a midtempo song that deals with running away with a lover, with lyrics such as "So many things I can't wait to show ya/Give me the chance to get to know ya/ … Here's our chance, let's/Take it and run." "Lighthouse" features metaphors of Jonas being trapped in a lighthouse with no windows. Jonas sings "But suddenly the truth doesn't feel so safe / You made a promise, you didn't keep it / There's no windows in this lighthouse / No answers to the questions why" in the mid-tempo song.

== Release and artwork ==
Fastlife was initially announced to have a release date of September 6, 2011. On July 29, it was confirmed that the album's release date had been pushed back to October 11, 2011, in the United States. The new release date coincided with Jonas' appearance as the opening act for various European shows on Britney Spears' worldwide Femme Fatale Tour (2011). The delayed release allowed Jonas to release the promotional single "Love Slayer" and official second single "Just in Love" to further promote the album, following the underperformance of the album's lead single. Jonas revealed the album's track list on September 1, though the remix of "Just in Love" was not on the list at the time. Previews of the album's songs became available online on October 6, only five days before its official release date. Fastlife was officially released in the Netherlands on October 11, 2011. It was released in North America on October 11, with a release in the United Kingdom following on October 24. Fastlife received a Parental Advisory label, affixed from the Recording Industry Association of America (RIAA) to identify explicit content.

While speaking with the Daily Bruin on the title of the record, Jonas stated "It was one of the first ideas for the album name. There's a song I wrote, called 'Fastlife', and it's about going out, having a good time and enjoying life to the fullest. That's how I look at life all the time. You might have speed bumps along the way, but you are just able to continue and have a great time." He later elaborated by adding "I think my life has been so crazy busy for the past year and a half, and I kind of wanted to show people a little bit more of what my life is about, bring them into it a little bit more, so that's been a fun experience." Jonas posted a virtual puzzle on his official website in August that allowed fans to attempt to put together the cover art for the album. The cover art was officially revealed on August 26, 2011. It features a close-up shot of Jonas in a black leather jacket, while the background consists of a blend of red, orange, and yellow lighting that has a "blurry, going-under-sedation" feel. The Hollywood Reporter wrote that the cover "shows a well-dressed Jonas staring deeply into the camera, with a bright background."

== Critical reception ==
Professional ratings
Aggregate scores
Source	Rating
Metacritic	66/100
Review scores
Source	Rating
Allmusic	4/5 stars
The Boston Globe	mixed
Entertainment Weekly	(B)
Rolling Stone	2/5 stars
Slant	3/5 stars
The Washington Post	favorable

Fastlife received positive reviews from music critics. At Metacritic, which assigns a normalized rating out of 100 to reviews from mainstream critics, the album received an average score of 66, based on 5 reviews, indicating "generally favorable reviews". Tim Sendra wrote a very positive review for Allmusic, rating it four stars out of five. Sendra perceived that Jonas "injected some personality" into the record, writing "Joe and his team of writers and producers put a lot of care into the sound of the record, making sure the uptempo tracks really have punch, the ballads have some grit, and the mid-tempo grooves have a believable amount of soul...Most importantly, a large part of the album is made up of songs with big melodic and rhythmic hooks that will propel you onto the dance-floor or have you singing along." Mikael Wood wrote for Entertainment Weekly that "Produced in large part by Danja, who worked on Justin Timberlake's FutureSex/LoveSounds, the club-friendly Fastlife largely favors the FutureSex — 'I'm loving that frame', Joe drools on 'Make You Mine' — yet it's the LoveSounds, as on gorgeous ballad 'Sorry', that most impress." Slant Magazine's Jonathan Keefe wrote a favorable review, commenting that "Jonas certainly can't match someone like Timberlake in terms of a defined aesthetic or presence, but at least he and his team had the smarts to enlist producers who know how to construct solid pop songs. That may not make Fastlife much of an artistic statement, but it does make it a better pop album than any of the Jonas Brothers' albums or Nick Jonas & the Administration's Who I Am (2010).

Allison Stewart wrote a favorable review for The Washington Post, stating that "Fastlife, is exactly what it should be, a fizzy, danceable, R&B-steeped club pop album that greases Jonas's transition to pop adulthood." Mesfin Fekadu wrote a mixed review for The Boston Globe, writing that "Overall, Fastlife is lifeless. Vocally, the 22-year-old Jonas is boring: He lacks energy when he sings, and even he doesn't seem interested in what he's singing about." Jody Rosen of Rolling Stone gave the album two out of five stars, calling Jonas' vocal performance "a flop" explaining "He sounds strained, simpering – like one of those High School Musical Disney kids trying to sing R&B." Common Sense Media generally praised the album, writing "Joe Jonas's dance-infused solo album is about 180 degrees different than the rock-leaning solo record from his younger brother, Nick. Yet like his bro, Joe has solid if not spectacular vocal talent and a penchant for producing catchy tunes with plenty of radio appeal." TheWrap wrote a mixed review for the album, stating "Fastlife isn't a terrible album, just a terribly producer-driven one, which leaves Jonas trying to fit into producer Danja's all-electro arrangements as nimbly as he squeezes into the designer duds he now favors." Pop Culture Online described the release as "a good album and Joe Jonas deserves recognition for his effort to appeal to a more mature audience. The young Jonas has good vocal tones a will surely go on to receive more radio air play and perhaps remixes in clubs." PluggedIn gave the album a negative review, commenting "Joe Jonas has evolved. Deal with it, we're told. But we'd rather not. I think for now we'll stick to wishing. If only the ready-to-commit, ready-to-take-responsibility side of Joe that we've glimpsed elsewhere could have convinced Fastlife Joe to slow down."

== Commercial performance ==
Fastlife debuted at number fifteen on the Billboard 200 in the United States with first week sales of 18,000 copies. The album fell to number 122 in its second week on the charts, marking its final appearance on the Billboard 200. It was reported in February 2015 that Fastlife had sold a total of 45,000 copies in the United States. Fastlife debuted at number twenty-three on the Canadian albums chart.

In the United Kingdom, Fastlife entered the UK Albums Chart at number ninety-nine, before falling off the chart the following week. The album fared slightly better in Italy, where it entered the charts at number twelve. The album spent a total of four weeks charting in the country. The album entered at number eight in Mexico, where it charted for a total of seven weeks. This marked Fastlife's longest chart run in any country. Fastlife peaked at number four in Portugal, marking its highest chart entry worldwide.

== Singles ==
"See No More" was released as the album's lead single on June 13, 2011. The song received a generally positive critical reception upon its release, with critics praising Jonas' new musical direction and vocal delivery. The song failed to have much commercial success, only reaching number ninety-two on the Billboard Hot 100 chart in the United States. "See No More" became Jonas' first song to chart on the Mainstream Top 40 chart, peaking at number thirty-seven. For the music video, Jonas "walks the earth, braves the elements and moves on from a broken heart." "Love Slayer" was released as a promotional single for the album prior to its release. The song was remixed and sent for airplay in night clubs, and as a result peaked at number eight on the Hot Dance Club Songs chart in the United States; it spent a total of thirteen weeks on the chart. "Love Slayer" remains his only appearance on the chart to date.

The album's second single, "Just in Love", was released on September 13, 2011. The song received a positive critical reception, namely for its production. Much like its predecessor, "Just in Love" failed to achieve commercial success upon its release. The song was released in a remixed form with rapper Lil Wayne on October 4, 2011. "Just in Love" failed to chart on the Billboard Hot 100, though did reach a peak of number three on the Bubbling Under Hot 100 singles chart. The song's music video saw Jonas and his on-screen girlfriend, model Angele Sassy, in various romantic settings throughout Europe. On December 9, 2011, a promotional video for "All This Time" was posted on French radio station NRJ's official website to promote the album in European territories.

== Promotion ==
Jonas performed "See No More", "Love Slayer", and "Fastlife" at Chicago's B96 Pepsi SummerBash on June 11, marking his first live performance as a solo artist. Jonas embarked on a promotional club tour throughout the United States to promote the album throughout June and July. On July 11, Jonas performed as the opening act for Swizz Beats during a promotional show in Brooklyn, though it was reported that the performance was met with a negative reaction from the crowd, who threw balls onto the stage. Alexis Swerdloff, editor of the show's sponsor Paper Magazine, claimed "There were a few balls thrown onto the stage — but they were promotional balls that were being thrown around all night — and that Joe was hardly met with stony silence! Rabid fans lined up around the block hours before the performance and were screaming throughout." Jonas performed "See No More" live on Late Night with Jimmy Fallon on July 13, marking his first televised live performance of the song. The performance was positively received, with Averi Harper of ChargedFM writing "His performance was complete with a couple of hip-hop back up dancers that gave him a Justin Timberlake kind of vibe. He's all grown up without the curly fro and donning a silver suit. Maybe getting the attention of women that are a little past their tween years."

On August 8, Jonas appeared on Lopez Tonight where he was interviewed and performed "See No More". On August 10, "Love Slayer" was released as a promotional single for the album intended for airplay in night clubs. Jonas teamed up with Cambio and Indaba Music to launch a contest that allowed fans to remix the song. The winner of the contest would receive $2,500 and their remix would be considered for an official release through Hollywood Records. The second and third-place winners also received cash, and were featured on the Cambio official website; ten honorable mentions won a copy of Fastlife upon its release later that year. The winner and runners-up of the contest were announced through the Cambio website on October 19, 2011. He performed a number of songs from the album for the iHeartRadio Live Show in New York on August 17. On August 22, Jonas appeared on Live on Letterman where he performed "Love Slayer", "Just in Love", "Fastlife", "Sorry", "Kleptomaniac", and "See No More". CBS Local wrote "One of the highlights of the evening was his rendition of 'Love Slayer' which is sure to become one of the bigger hits off this album. Listen to hear the screams from the ladies in the audience as Joe and his dancers tackle that number." Popcrush stated "With his Mediterranean good looks and sharp grey suit, which he paired with sneakers, Jonas sang and danced his way into many teenage hearts." Jonas appeared on Live with Regis and Kelly on September 8 to perform "Sorry".

Jonas co-headlined the Joe Jonas & Jay Sean Tour beginning on September 9, alongside artist Jay Sean and opening act JoJo. The tour lasted until October 6, 2011. Jonas performed a number of songs from Fastlife on the tour, as well as his own renditions of Jonas Brothers songs. The tour was initially set to only allow audience members to be above the age of eighteen due to venue locations, though this was lifted due to high demand. The tour received a mixed reception, with the Daily Bruin writing "While Jonas takes on the challenge to create a more mature sound and steer away from his tween image, there's no doubt that fans were more receptive of his songs from his Jonas Brothers days." Neon Limelight wrote "Impressing the crowd with his choreographed new moves, Joe came ready to shut the place down, and while he may not have done quite what he intended with his set, he definitely served up an E for effort." Jonas returned to television appearances on September 26, performing "Just in Love" on The Ellen DeGeneres Show. He again performed "Just in Love" on The Today Show on October 5. The performance served as his last promotional spot in the United States before traveling to Europe to promote the album.

Joe was the opening act for pop singer Britney Spears on ten European dates for her Femme Fatale Tour (2011). Jonas stated "She was the first girl I ever had a poster on my wall of, and her album was the first CD I ever bought. It's so funny to think I had that on my wall and here I am about to perform with her." Joe first opened the tour on October 16 in Sweden, touring with Spears until the October 31st show. Upon returning to the United States, Jonas appeared on The Tonight Show with Jay Leno on November 3, performing "Just in Love". He then appeared on Conan on November 7, and once more performed "Just in Love". On the performance, Popcrush wrote "Jonas and his band delivered a lively version of the track, with electric guitar flourishes and a slower intro section added to the arrangement." Due to the commercial failure of Fastlife, further promotion for the album was halted following the performance on Conan.

== Track listing ==
No.	Title	Writer(s)	Producer(s)	Length
1.	"All This Time"	Joe Jonas; Nathaniel Hills; Kevin Cossom; Marcella Araica	Danja; Jim Beanz (vocal)	4:27
2.	"Just in Love"	Jonas; Robin Tadross; James Fauntleroy; LaShawn Daniels	Rob Knox	3:27
3.	"See No More"	Jonas; Christopher Brown; Brian Kennedy	Chris Brown (co.); Kennedy	3:52
4.	"Love Slayer"	Hills; Cossom; Araica	Danja; Beanz(vocal)	4:10
5.	"Fastlife"	Jonas; Tadross; Fauntleroy; Daniels	Knox	4:01
6.	"Make You Mine"	Jonas; Hills; Claude Kelly; Araica	Danja; Kelly(vocal)	4:12
7.	"Sorry"	Jonas; Tadross; Fauntleroy; Daniels; Nuno Bettencourt	Knox	5:03
8.	"Kleptomaniac"	Adonis Shropshire; Tiffany Fred	Shropshire	4:04
9.	"Not Right Now"	Jonas; Hills; Cossom; Araica; James Washington	Danja; Beanz(vocal)	3:49
10.	"Take It and Run"	Hills; Cossom; Araica	Danja; Beanz (vocal)	4:36
11.	"Lighthouse"	Brown; Chauncey Hollis, Jr.; Kevin McCall	Brown (co.); Hit-Boy	3:45
12.	"Just in Love" (featuring Lil Wayne)	Jonas; Dwayne Carter, Jr.; Tadross; Fauntleroy; Daniels	Knox	3:27
Total length:				48:52

iTunes Store bonus tracks
No.	Title	Writer(s)	Producer(s)	Length
13.	"Just in Love" (Moto Blanco Radio Edit Remix)	Jonas; Knox; Tadross; Fauntleroy; Daniels	Knox	3:45
14.	"Just in Love" (Soul Seekerz Radio Remix)	Jonas; Knox; Tadross; Fauntleroy; Daniels	Knox	3:44
Total length:				56:21

== Charts ==
Chart (2011)	Peak Position
Argentinian Albums Chart	5
Belgian Albums Chart (Flanders)	42
Belgian Albums Chart (Wallonia)	54
Dutch Albums Chart	85
French Albums Chart	75
Italian Albums Chart	12
Mexican Albums Chart	8
Portuguese Albums Chart	4
Spanish Albums Chart	9
UK Albums Chart	99
US Billboard 200	15

== Release history ==
Country	Date	Label
Netherlands	October 7, 2011	Hollywood
Poland	October 10, 2011	Hollywood
Canada	October 11, 2011	Hollywood
Mexico	October 11, 2011	Hollywood
United States	October 11, 2011	Hollywood
Australia	October 13, 2011	Hollywood
Argentina	October 14, 2011	Hollywood
France	October 14, 2011	Hollywood
Germany	October 14, 2011	Hollywood
Brazil	October 18, 2011	Hollywood
Philippines	October 22, 2011	Hollywood
United Kingdom	October 24, 2011	Hollywood
