= Just in Love =

Single by Joe Jonas

from the album Fastlife
- Released: September 13, 2011
- Genre: Pop; R&B
- Length: 3:27
- Label: Hollywood
- Songwriter(s): Joe Jonas; James Fauntleroy II; LaShawn Daniels; Robin Tadross
- Producer(s): Rob Knox

Joe Jonas singles chronology
"See No More" (2011)	"Just in Love" (2011)	"One Chance to Dance" (2017)

Music video
- "Just in Love" on YouTube

"Just in Love" is a song by American singer Joe Jonas. The song was released on September 13, 2011 by Hollywood Records, as the second and final single from his debut studio album, Fastlife (2011). The song was written by Jonas and James Fauntleroy and produced by Rob Knox. The song garnered mixed reception from music critics. An official remix of the track features a verse from American rapper Lil Wayne and slightly altered production; it received a Parental Advisory sticker for this because of the explicit lyrics Lil Wayne raps, but the clean version was made the official version. The Lil Wayne remix was also featured in May 2019, on the tracklist of Jonas Brothers reunion documentary, Chasing Happiness. Lil Wayne's explicit lyrics are said there, but however, it does not have an explicit content tag and does not credit Lil Wayne's feature as well.

== Background and composition ==
"Just in Love"
A 20 second sample of "Just in Love" by Joe Jonas, where a portion of the chorus is heard.

The song was written by Joe Jonas and James Fauntleroy, with production by Rob Knox. "Just in Love" is a Latin-tinged dance track with a thumping beat behind a synthy sound. In the song, Joe professes his love for a girl who may not be clear about his intentions. On the chorus, he sings, "Just running from the truth/ That I'm scared of losing you/ You are worth too much to lose/ Baby, even if you're still confused/ Girl I'm just in love with you."

Jonas explained the song’s origin, telling Ryan Seacrest: "This is a song I wrote when I was going through a relationship with somebody. She [was] arguing with me, and all I could do was say ‘Listen, I love you, but we don’t need to go through this’".

== Critical reception ==
Scott Shetler from Pop Crunch rated it 4.5 out of five stars and says that "a seductive song that impresses in just about every way. The track has a lot of energy, with guitars and synths accentuating a powerful beat."

== Music video ==
Joe Jonas in the music video for 'Just in Love'.

The official music video for the song premiered on September 12, 2011 on E! News. It was directed by Jaci Judelson.

=== Synopsis ===
The video is composed of shots of Joe Jonas and his female companion (played by French model Angele Sassy) as they make out all around Paris, weaving together the tale of their brief but passionate love affair. However, all good things must come to an end and Joe leaves his French lady love behind. The video closes out with Joe looking back as he walks away in the dark of the night.

=== Reception ===
VH1 says of Joe’s new vid, "it’s a smart play: as he toes the line of ‘adult’ representation regarding sex, which everybody notices, he slyly introduces a more grown-up aesthetic in the background. And for our money, it works." MTV adds, "the retro-tinged, very sexy clip is set in Paris, with Joe cavorting around town with French model Angele. The two run around in their designer duds, making out in cafés, catching the metro, driving around in cars, hanging out in a bathtub and kissing in bed (a lot)." The Improper makes this quip about Jonas and his gal pal: "no purity rings are in sight as Joe climbs into the tub with her and the two have sex." The Huffington Post notes, "Paris has always been the city of transformations. It was true for Audrey Hepburn, it was true for Ernest Hemingway and now the city of light can be proud of initiating another young soul: Joe Jonas."

== Remix ==
On October 3, 2011, the official remix was released on On Air with Ryan Seacrest. It featured a new verse and background vocals from rapper Lil Wayne, replacing the second verse. The song was made available on iTunes on October 4, 2011. The remix is featured on the Fastlife CD, however, it is censored at two spots during Lil Wayne's rap.

== Track list ==
Digital download

- Just In Love 3:27

Remixes

- Just In Love [Moto Blanco Radio Mix] 3:43
- Just In Love [Moto Blanco Club Mix] 6:42
- Just In Love [Moto Blanco Instrumental] 6:42
- Just In Love [Soul Seekerz Radio Mix] 3:43
- Just In Love [Soul Seekerz Club Mix] 8:04
- Just In Love [Soul Seekerz Instrumental] 8:04
- Just In Love [Remix] 3:27 featuring Lil Wayne
- Just In Love [Clean Remix] 3:27 featuring Lil Wayne

== Charts ==
Chart (2011)	Peak position
Belgium (Ultratip Bubbling Under Flanders)	22
Belgium (Ultratip Bubbling Under Wallonia)	6
Romania (Romanian Top 100)	64
UK Singles (Official Charts Company)	85
