= Wedding Bells (Jonas Brothers song) =

Song by Jonas Brothers

from the album LiVe
- Released: November 27, 2013
- Recorded: 2012–2013
- Genre: Pop rock; soft rock
- Length: 4:05
- Label: Jonas Enterprises; Universal Music Group
- Songwriter(s): Nick Jonas
- Producer(s): Nick Jonas

"Wedding Bells" is a song by the Jonas Brothers, written and produced by Nick Jonas.

== Background and composition ==
"Wedding Bells"
A 23-second sample of "Wedding Bells" by Jonas Brothers, where a portion of the chorus is heard.

"You deal with other artists too, and when that's the situation, there's a mutual understanding that it's your way of expressing yourself. So it's necessary for you to talk about these things and they kind of have to know when they get involved, that's a possibility" -Nick Jonas said of their upcoming album during Jonas Brothers: Live From MTV.

"Wedding Bells" made direct references to Nick's ex-girlfriend Miley Cyrus, to which Cyrus acknowledged, stating that she felt that it was blatant that the song was about her but that she didn't mind being alluded to in the song. In "Wedding Bells", one of the lyrics are "'Cause if you recall our anniversary falls 11 nights into June", referencing to the date (June 11, 2006); of which Nick and Miley met, which Cyrus revealed in her 2009 autobiography Miles to Go, where she refers to Nick as "Prince Charming" but does not say his name outright.

During the concert in New York, Nick spoke about the song before he started singing it. Nick told the crowd, "You have to write a song and apologize for it later... I don't know that I've ever written a song that makes me as uncomfortable as this song does... and although it's not the way I feel at this moment in time, hopefully this gives you a glimpse into what that experience was like for me." In January, he released a picture of the sheet music on his instagram.

On May 21, 2013, a snippet of the studio version was released online. On November 27 of the same year, the full studio version of the song was released online.

== Reception ==
On October 18, 2012, Miley Cyrus spoke about the song with Ryan Seacrest. When asked if she thought the song was about her, she responded, "I don't know who else is getting married... so I feel like that's pretty blatant, it's whatever."

"Like I said, everyone has to write songs that are about things that they felt and he even introduced that this isn't the way that I am. So, you can't ever hate on someone for writing about something you've been through. I think that you kind of get a fair warning when you date an artist and someone that's a writer. When you're going through things that you're going to end up hearing about it on the radio."

== Live performances ==
The song was performed live for the first time on October 11 at the Radio City Music Hall in New York during the reunion concert of the Jonas Brothers. It was performed during the Asia, European and North American legs of the 2012/2013 World Tour. The song was also performed during Jingle Ball on December 1, 2012. The song was also performed during the Festival Internacional de la Canción de Viña del Mar. After that the song was taken off the main setlist during the South American dates of the tour. It was performed again on February 22. after that it as re-added to the main setlist of the tour. They performed the song again on June 1 during the Acapulco Festival in Mexico.

During the first concert on July 10, they performed "Wedding Bells" again.

== Personnel ==
- Nick Jonas – lead vocals, writer, guitar, keyboards, bass guitar, programming, producer
- Joe Jonas – background vocals
- Kevin Jonas II – guitar, background vocals
