= First Time (Jonas Brothers song) =

Single by Jonas Brothers

from the album Live
- Released: June 25, 2013
- Recorded: 2012
- Length: 3:48
- Label: Jonas
- Songwriters: Nick Jonas; Joe Jonas; Kevin Jonas
- Producer: Nick Jonas

Jonas Brothers singles chronology
"Pom Poms" (2013)	"First Time" (2013)	"Sucker" (2019)

Music video
- "First Time" on YouTube

"First Time" is a song recorded by American band, Jonas Brothers. The song was released on June 25, 2013, as the second single from their second live album, Live, by Jonas Enterprises. This was the final single released by the group before their breakup until the release of "Sucker" in 2019.

== Background and composition ==
"First Time"
A 21 second sample of "First Time" by Jonas Brothers, where a portion of the chorus is heard.

This new song is all about taking advantage of those moments and making them truly special. :-Nick Jonas shared of "First Time."

Though it does have the family harmonies of the brothers’ past releases, "First Time" really is an older sound, nice and danceable with a bit of an electronica feel. It’s all representative of the evolution of the band :-Nick Jonas shared of "First Time."

According to Joe Jonas, said in an interview with MTV on April 22 that the new single is possibly set to be released before they hit the road again in July 2013. On June 10, Kevin Jonas announced during a radio interview that the new single is coming soon. The next day on June 11 the single cover was released. "First Time", the album's second single, was announced on June 12 as the album's second single. During a livechat on Monday June 17, the release date will be announced. The full version of the song was leaked online on June 12. After leaking early the official release date was announced on June 14; The single will be released on June 25, 2013. Nick Jonas talked about the song in an interview with MTV on June 25; He Said: "I think it felt right. It felt like the kind of song that people that weren't maybe as familiar with our music and maybe wouldn't have called themselves fans would respond positively to because it's so different for us,". "Or, at least, I hope they will and it's one of my favorites, one of all of our favorites, I think from the minute we created it. So hopefully it's a positive reaction and it goes over great live. It's a big party when we play that song."

== Music video ==
The music video for "First Time" was filmed during the rehearsals for Miss USA 2013 at the Planet Hollywood in Las Vegas. On June 24 a sixteen-second preview of the video was released online. It shows the Jonas Brothers having fun at the pool with friends. On July 16, 2013, a second preview of the song was released online. The video premiered on July 17.

== Critical reception ==
"First Time" received generally positive reviews from critics. MuuMuse lauded the song, calling it an "infinitely lush and understated production" and "really beautiful". Sam Lansky of Idolator compared the "swoony and sincere" song to tracks by Coldplay and Kings of Leon, praising its "fizzy production" and "big, gorgeous, lighters-up chorus". Lansky went on to call it the band's best song and compared the "summer beach-party winding-down anthem" to the work of Mae and Death Cab for Cutie "at their poppiest".

== Live performances ==
The song was performed live for the first time on October 11 at the Radio City Music Hall in New York during the reunion concert of the Jonas Brothers. It was performed during the Asia, European and North American legs of the 2012/2013 World Tour. After that the song was taken off the main setlist during the South American dates of the tour. It was performed again on February 20.

They talked about the new record during the TV show on Live! with Kelly and Michael on April 18, 2013. During the show they performed the songs "Pom Poms" and "First Time". They performed the song again on June 1 during the Acapulco Festival in Mexico. They are set to perform the song in a medley with Pom Poms and as of June 14 a surprise song at the Miss USA 2013 competition. On June 16, it was revealed that the third song was Neon. They are set to perform the song as part of a medley during the Live Music Day. They performed First Time and Lovebug after Pom Poms on Live Music Day. During the first concert on July 10, they performed the song again.

== Track listing ==
Digital download
No.	Title	Length
1.	"First Time"	3:48

== Charts ==
Chart performance for "First Time"
Chart (2013)	Peak position
South Korea International Chart (GAON)	64
US Bubbling Under Hot 100 (Billboard)	14
US Pop Airplay (Billboard)	34

== Release history ==
Region	Date	Format	Label
United States	June 25, 2013	Mainstream airplay	Jonas Enterprises; Universal Music Group
United States	June 25, 2013	Digital download	Jonas Enterprises; Universal Music Group
Canada	June 25, 2013	Digital download	Jonas Enterprises; Universal Music Group
New Zealand	June 25, 2013	Digital download	Jonas Enterprises; Universal Music Group
Australia	June 25, 2013	Digital download	Jonas Enterprises; Universal Music Group
The Netherlands	September 20, 2013	Digital download	Jonas Enterprises; Universal Music Group
Belgium	September 20, 2013	Digital download	Jonas Enterprises; Universal Music Group
Russia	September 23, 2013	Digital download	Jonas Enterprises; Universal Music Group
France	September 23, 2013	Digital download	Jonas Enterprises; Universal Music Group
Spain	September 23, 2013	Digital download	Jonas Enterprises; Universal Music Group
Italy	September 23, 2013	Digital download	Jonas Enterprises; Universal Music Group
