= Fly with Me (Jonas Brothers song) =

Single by Jonas Brothers

from the album Lines, Vines and Trying Times
- Released: August 24, 2009
- Genre: Pop rock
- Length: 3:54 (album version); 3:49 (music video version)
- Label: Hollywood
- Songwriters: Jonas Brothers; Greg Garbowsky
- Producer: John Fields

Jonas Brothers singles chronology
"Paranoid" (2009)	"Fly with Me" (2009)	"Pom Poms" (2013)

Music video
- "Fly with Me" on YouTube

"Fly with Me" is the second single by American pop rock band Jonas Brothers from their fourth studio album Lines, Vines and Trying Times. It was released on June 9, 2009, through Hollywood Records. The song was introduced in the closing credits of the 2009 film Night at the Museum: Battle of the Smithsonian, in which the Brothers provided voiceover work. A Cantonese version of the song is played in the Flights of Fantasy Parade at Hong Kong Disneyland. An orchestrated instrumental arrangement of the song plays in the presentation of the honorary grand marshal that precedes the Festival of Fantasy Parade at Magic Kingdom, at Walt Disney World.

== Composition ==
"Fly with Me" was written by Nick Jonas, Joe Jonas, Kevin Jonas and Greg Garbowsky, while production was handled by John Fields. According to the sheet music published at Musicnotes.com, by Alfred Music Publishing, the track runs at 152 BPM and is in the key of C major, with a range in the song spanning from the notes G3 to F#5. It was written about Kevin and Danielle Jonas' relationship before marriage, despite both of them being far apart from each other.

== Critical reception ==
"Fly with Me" was met with mixed reviews from music critics. Bill Lamb of About.com stated, "[W]ith the piano, harp and chimes [sic] sounds [...] we begin an ultimately annoying program of guess which new instruments and even new genre we'll attempt on the next track." Jonathan Keefe of Slant Magazine said of the song, "sound like outtakes from recent parody of the band on South Park." Leah Greenblatt of Entertainment Weekly described the track as "wholesome" and " bow dutifully to the Jonases' younger fan base."

== Music video ==
The music video premiered on the Disney Channel on June 7, 2009, and was uploaded to group's YouTube account on the same day. It features footage of the group rehearsing the song with backstage "behind-the-scenes" video clips of their 2009 World Tour preparation and rehearsals.

== Track listing ==
- German and UK CD single
1. "Fly with Me" – 3:54
2. "That's Just the Way We Roll" (Live from The 3D Concert Experience) – 4:08
3. "S.O.S." (ITunes Live from Soho) – 2:31
4. "A Little Bit Longer" (ITunes Live from Soho) – 5:47
- UK enhanced CD single
1. "Fly with Me" – 3:30
2. "Fly with Me" (video) – 3:30
3. "Paranoid" (video) – 3:47

== Charts ==
Chart performance for "Fly with Me"
Chart (2009)	Peak position
Germany (GfK)	89
Japan (Japan Hot 100)	80
Lithuania (European Hit Radio)	45
Mexico Anglo (Monitor Latino)	7
UK Singles (Official Charts Company)	166
US Billboard Hot 100	83
Venezuela Top Anglo (Record Report)	25

== Release history ==
Release dates and formats for "Fly with Me"
Region	Date	Format	Label	Ref.
United Kingdom	August 24, 2009	CD single	Polydor	
Germany	September 25, 2009	CD single	Universal	
