= Lines, Vines and Trying Times =

2009 studio album by Jonas Brothers

Studio album by Jonas Brothers
- Released: June 16, 2009
- Recorded: 2008–2009
- Studios: Studio Wishbone, Ocean Way Recording
- Genre: Rock
- Length: 47:35
- Label: Hollywood
- Producer: John Fields

Jonas Brothers chronology
Music from the 3D Concert Experience (2009)	Lines, Vines and Trying Times (2009)	Live: Walmart Soundcheck (2009)

Singles from Lines, Vines and Trying Times
- 1. "Paranoid" Released: May 12, 2009; 2. "Fly with Me" Released: June 9, 2009

Lines, Vines and Trying Times is the fourth studio album by American pop rock band Jonas Brothers. It was released on June 16, 2009, through Hollywood Records. The album received mixed reviews from critics and fans. In its first week, the album sold 247,000 copies, debuting at number one on the Billboard 200. It was their third and last album released under Hollywood Records, and their last before a hiatus, which lasted from October 2013 to March 2019.

== Background ==
In an interview with Rolling Stone, Nick Jonas explained the title, Lines, Vines and Trying Times as "a bit of poetry we came up with on the set for the TV show." On the meaning, he stated, "Lines are something that someone feeds you, whether it's good or bad. Vines are the things that get in the way of the path that you're on, and trying times – well, obviously we're younger guys, but we're aware of what's going on in the world and we're trying to bring some light to it." He noted, "this new album for us, I wouldn't say it's a big jump, but it definitely is a progression in our music and a growth for us. It has a lot more kinds of horns and a lot more strings." Added Joe Jonas, "there's more to the music rather than just a typical kind of relationship song."

== Promotion ==
The Jonas Brothers were promoting the album on their 2009 world tour which began on May 18, 2009 in Lima, Peru. The track "Fly with Me" was featured during the end credits of Night at the Museum: Battle of the Smithsonian. They hosted three live web chats via Facebook (May 7, May 28 and June 4) to promote the album. The brothers performed songs off the album for a Walmart Soundcheck concert which was released on June 9, 2009. They performed on Good Morning America on June 12, 2009 as part of GMA's Summer Concert Series. Radio Disney premiered all the songs from the album over a period of four days between June 11 and June 14. The entire album premiered on June 16, 2009. On June 21, 2009, they co-hosted and performed at the 2009 MuchMusic Video Awards. The Jonas Brothers appeared on various television programs to promote the album which included: Live with Regis & Kelly, Late Show with David Letterman, Good Morning America, Jimmy Kimmel Live!, El Hormiguero, Larry King Live, The Today Show, Ellen and Late Night with Jimmy Fallon. On August 9, 2009, they hosted the 2009 Teen Choice Awards along with performing "Much Better".

== Critical reception ==
Professional ratings
Aggregate scores
Source	Rating
Metacritic	56/100
Review scores
Source	Rating
About.com	2.5/5 stars
AllMusic	3/5 stars
Chicago Tribune	2/5 stars
Consequence of Sound	3/5 stars
Entertainment Weekly	B−
Los Angeles Times	2.5/4 stars
New York Daily News	2.5/5 stars
PopMatters	3/10
Rolling Stone	3/5 stars
Slant Magazine	2/5 stars
Sputnikmusic	1.5/5 stars

Reviews for the album were mixed, both from critics and fans saying that it was "premature". According to review aggregator Metacritic, the album has received mixed or average reviews, scoring 56 out of 100 points based on 11 reviews. AllMusic named "overthinking and over-production" as the album's main flaws, and noted that the group's combination of "teen pop that skews adult in its sound and form" seemed effortless on their previous album, A Little Bit Longer, but felt that on Lines the "seams are showing." Greg Kot of the Chicago Tribune claimed, "The rush to maturity is, well, premature," and added that "the strings and horns [...] only bog things down." Entertainment Weekly criticized "Don't Charge Me for the Crime," calling it "the sonic equivalent of being held at gunpoint by a baby rabbit," but praised "Black Keys" as being the most honest track, adding that "its quiet brushstrokes of teenage despair easily transcend Lines' misdemeanor mutinies." The New York Daily News criticized "World War III," saying, "it sounds like they just pulled a collective hernia." In a two-star review, Evening Standard critic John Aizlewood enjoyed the jaunty fiddle in "What Did I Do to Your Heart?" and Common's thoughtful rap on "Don't Charge Me for the Crime", but felt that the remainder of the album "sinks in a swamp of sub-McFly blanditude."

== Singles ==
"Paranoid" was released as the album's lead single on May 12, 2009. Hollywood Records confirmed on April 29, 2009 that the track "Paranoid" would be the album's official single. On May 7, 2009 the song debuted on Radio Disney. It was released as an official radio single on May 8, 2009 and as a digital download on May 12. The music video was directed by Brendan Malloy and Tim Wheeler. The music video for Paranoid premiered on May 23, 2009 on Disney Channel. Paranoid peaked at number 37 on the Billboard Hot 100. "Fly with Me" was released as a single on June 9, 2009. The song was first used during the end credits of the movie Night at the Museum 2: Battle of the Smithsonian. A music video for the song premiered on Disney Channel on June 7, 2009. "Fly with Me" peaked at number 83 on the Billboard Hot 100, making it one of the group's lower charting singles.

Promotional single

"Keep It Real" was released as promotional single on September 6, 2009. Critiques of the song noted its strong similarities to Maxine Nightingale' 1975 recording "Right Back Where We Started From".

== Commercial performance ==
Lines, Vines and Trying Times debuted at number one on the US Billboard 200 with 247,000 copies, becoming the Jonas Brothers' second number-one album in the country. As of March 2015, the album has sold 757,000 copies in the United States.

== Track listing ==
All tracks are produced by John Fields.

Lines, Vines and Trying Times track listing
No.	Title	Writer(s)	Length
1.	"World War III"	Nicholas Jonas	3:12
2.	"Paranoid"	N. Jonas; Joseph Jonas; Kevin Jonas II; Cathy Dennis; John Fields	3:38
3.	"Fly with Me"	N. Jonas; J. Jonas; K. Jonas; Greg Garbowsky	3:54
4.	"Poison Ivy"	N. Jonas; J. Jonas; K. Jonas; Garbowsky	4:08
5.	"Hey Baby"	N. Jonas; J. Jonas; K. Jonas	3:18
6.	"Before the Storm" (featuring Miley Cyrus)	N. Jonas; J. Jonas; K. Jonas; Miley Cyrus	4:26
7.	"What Did I Do to Your Heart"	N. Jonas; J. Jonas; K. Jonas	3:17
8.	"Much Better"	N. Jonas; J. Jonas; K. Jonas	4:35
9.	"Black Keys"	N. Jonas	3:48
10.	"Don't Charge Me for the Crime" (featuring Common)	N. Jonas; J. Jonas; K. Jonas; Ryan Liestman; Lonnie Lynn, Jr.	3:59
11.	"Turn Right"	N. Jonas; J. Jonas; K. Jonas	2:48
12.	"Don't Speak"	N. Jonas; J. Jonas; K. Jonas; Fields	3:55
13.	"Keep It Real" (bonus track)	N. Jonas; J. Jonas; K. Jonas	2:51
Total length:			47:35

Japanese edition track listing
No.	Title	Writer(s)	Length
14.	"Infatuation" (Japanese bonus track)	David Darlington; Thomas G:son; Toshiya Kamada; Atsushi Kosugi	3:32
Total length:			51:07

Limited Edition Fan Pack track listing
No.	Title	Writer(s)	Length
13.	"Paranoid" (Soul Seekerz Radio Edit)	N. Jonas; J. Jonas; K. Jonas; Dennis	3:41
14.	"Paranoid" (Soul Seekerz Club Edit)	N. Jonas; J. Jonas; K. Jonas; Dennis	6:52
15.	"Fly With Me" (Digital Dog Radio Edit)	N. Jonas; J. Jonas; K. Jonas; Garbowsky	3:39
Total length:			61:47

Note

- The Limited Edition Fan Pack box set includes bonus features: "Exclusive Photo Shoot Video Montage", "Jonas Brothers Questions and Answers", "Jonas Brothers Talk You Through the Album"; and official videos: "Paranoid" (Music Video), "Paranoid" (Making of the Video), "Paranoid" (Karaoke Version), "Fly with Me" (Music Video) and "Fly with Me" (Karaoke Version).

== Personnel ==
Jonas Brothers

- Kevin Jonas II – lead guitar, backing vocals
- Joe Jonas – lead vocals
- Nick Jonas – guitars, lead vocals, keyboards, piano, glockenspiel, drums on "What Did I Do to Your Heart", "Hey Baby" and "Keep It Real"

Additional musicians

- John Fields – bass, guitars, keyboards, programming, vocals, percussion, baritone guitar, talk box
- John Taylor – lead guitar, vocals
- Dorian Crozier – drums, percussion, programming
- Ken Chastain – percussion, programming, keyboards
- Steve Lu – keyboards
- Commissioner Mike – police scanner on "Don't Charge Me for the Crime"
- Common – guest rap on "Don't Charge Me for the Crime"
- Chris Beaty – guitar solo on "Much Better"
- Will Owsley – pedal steel and guitar on "Turn Right"; mandolin and baritone guitar on "What Did I Do to Your Heart"
- Stuart Duncan – fiddle on "Turn Right" and "What Did I Do to Your Heart"
- Greg Garbowsky – bass on "What Did I Do to Your Heart"
- Jon Lind – acoustic guitar on "What Did I Do to Your Heart"
- Frédéric Yonnet – harmonica on "What Did I Do to Your Heart"
- Bruce Bouton – pedal steel on "Before the Storm"
- Miley Cyrus – guest vocal on "Before the Storm"
- Millard Powers – 12-string acoustic guitar on "Before The Storm"
- Michael Bland – drums on "Hey Baby" and "Paranoid"
- Jonny Lang – lead guitar on "Hey Baby"
- Steve Roehm – vibraphone on "Paranoid"
- Strings on "Black Keys", "Don't Speak", "Fly with Me", and "Before the Storm" arranged and conducted by Steve Lu and performed by Eric Gorfain, Daphne Chen, Radu Pieptea, Wes Precourt (violins), Caroline Buckman, Briana Bandy (violas), Richard Dodd and Matt Cooker (cellos).
- Horns on "Much Better" and "Hey Baby" arranged by Michael Nelson and performed by The Hornheads: Steve Strand (lead trumpet), Dave Jensen (trumpet), Michael Nelson (trombone), Kenni Holmen (tenor saxophone), Kathy Jensen (baritone saxophone).
- Horns on "Poison Ivy" arranged by Ken Chastain and performed by Matt Darling (trombone), Joe Mechtenberg (saxophone), Zack Lozier (trumpet).
- Horns on "World War III" arranged by Jerry Hey (trumpet), Gary Grant (trumpet), Dan Higgins (saxophone), Bill Reichenbach Jr. (trombone).
- Horns on "Keep It Real" arranged by Steve Lu and performed by Dan Fornero (trumpet), George Stanford (trombone), Brian Gallagher (saxophone).

Production

- John Fields – producer, engineer, mixing
- Paul David Hager – mixing, additional engineering
- Will Owsley – additional engineering
- Ken Chastain – additional engineering
- Michael B. Nelson – additional engineering
- Steven Miller – strings engineer
- Wesley Seidman – assistant strings engineer
- Dave McNair – mastering

== Charts ==
=== Weekly charts ===
Weekly chart performance for Lines, Vines and Trying Times
Chart (2009–2010)	Peak position
Argentina Albums (CAPIF)	3
Australian Albums (ARIA)	5
Austrian Albums (Ö3 Austria)	33
Belgian Albums (Ultratop Flanders)	16
Belgian Albums (Ultratop Wallonia)	20
Brazil Albums (ABPD)	5
Canadian Albums (Billboard)	1
Danish Albums (Hitlisten)	28
Dutch Albums (Album Top 100)	21
European Albums (Billboard)	7
Finnish Albums (Suomen virallinen lista)	15
French Albums (SNEP)	17
German Albums (Offizielle Top 100)	56
Greek Albums (IFPI)	6
Hungarian Albums (MAHASZ)	18
Irish Albums (IRMA)	6
Italian Albums (FIMI)	8
Japan Top Album Sales (Billboard Japan)	61
Mexican Albums (AMPROFON)	1
New Zealand Albums (RMNZ)	8
Norwegian Albums (VG-lista)	25
Polish Albums (ZPAV)	22
Portuguese Albums (AFP)	3
Scottish Albums (Official Charts)	12
Spanish Albums (Promusicae)	1
Swedish Albums (Sverigetopplistan)	14
Swiss Albums (Schweizer Hitparade)	46
Taiwan Albums (G-Music)	16
UK Albums (Official Charts)	9
US Billboard 200	1

=== Year-end charts ===
Year-end chart performance for Lines, Vines and Trying Times
Chart (2009)	Position
Canadian Albums (Billboard)	34
French Albums (SNEP)	169
US Billboard 200	54

== Certifications and sales ==
Certifications and sales for Lines, Vines and Trying Times
Region	Certification	Certified units/sales
Argentina (CAPIF)	Platinum	40,000^{^}
Brazil (Pro-Música Brasil)	Gold	30,000^{*}
Canada (Music Canada)	Platinum	80,000^{^}
Italy (FIMI)	Gold	30,000^{*}
Mexico (AMPROFON)	Gold	40,000^{^}
Spain (Promusicae)	Platinum	80,000^{^}
United States	—	757,000
^{*} Sales figures based on certification alone.^{^} Shipments figures based on certification alone.

== Release history ==
Region	Date
The Netherlands, Italy, France, Poland, Greece, Austria, Spain, Estonia, and Ireland	June 12, 2009
United Kingdom (selected), Portugal, Philippines and Mexico	June 15, 2009
United States, Canada, Brazil, and Colombia	June 16, 2009
Asia and Latin America	June 17, 2009
Australia and Oceania	June 19, 2009
