= Paranoid (Jonas Brothers song) =

Single by Jonas Brothers

from the album Lines, Vines and Trying Times
- Released: May 12, 2009
- Studio: Wishbone (Los Angeles, CA)
- Length: 3:39
- Label: Hollywood
- Songwriter(s): Nicholas Jerry Jonas; Joseph Adam Jonas; Paul Kevin Jonas II; Cathy Dennis; John Fields
- Producer(s): John Fields

Jonas Brothers singles chronology
"Tonight" (2009)	"Paranoid" (2009)	"Fly with Me" (2009)

Music video
- "Paranoid" on YouTube

"Paranoid" is the first single by American pop band Jonas Brothers from their fourth studio album, Lines, Vines and Trying Times. It was released on May 12, 2009, by Hollywood Records. The three brothers wrote the song with English singer Cathy Dennis and their record producer John Fields.

== Background and composition ==
"Paranoid"
A 21 second sample of "Paranoid" by Jonas Brothers, where a portion of the chorus is heard.

The song made its debut on Radio Disney on May 7, 2009, and proceeded to be released on Facebook during a live webcast. It was released on iTunes on May 12, 2009. It was subsequently released to mainstream radio on May 18, 2009.

== Music video ==
The music video was directed by Brendan Malloy and Tim Wheeler, who also directed the video for the group's song "Burnin' Up". The video premiered on May 23, 2009 on the Disney Channel.

The music video opens with Joe, Nick and Kevin sitting in three chairs in an empty warehouse, where they turn to each other but each brother switches seats suddenly. Then it shows scenes of all the brothers on their own. Kevin is in a room full of his clones, Joe goes up a ladder in a hotel hallway and finds himself in a wrestling ring and Nick opens a door in the hotel and is lost in a desert where his car comes and he starts driving. Once he is crossing the desert, he notices a girl in a car beside him, pointing him back on the road. Nick suddenly runs into a door, and he awakens from a dream. Joe and Kevin ask Nick if he's okay then notice two wrestlers and the girl in his car, who seem to have suddenly appeared, with numerous Kevin clones running towards them. This is all shown with scenes of the brothers playing in the warehouse from the opening. The music video was released on iTunes on May 26, 2009, and can now be found on YouTube. The video was filmed on May 3–5, 2009.

== Track listing ==
US and Europe CD single

1. "Paranoid"
2. "Pushin' Me Away" (from The 3D Concert Experience)

== Commercial performance ==
The song debuted on the Billboard Hot 100 at number 37.

== Charts ==
=== Weekly charts ===
Chart performance for "Paranoid"
Chart (2009)	Peak position
Belgium (Ultratip Bubbling Under Flanders)	12
Canada (Canadian Hot 100)	47
Chile (EFE)	7
Columbia (EFE)	5
Costa Rica (EFE)	2
Germany (GfK)	65
Guatemala (EFE)	3
Ireland (IRMA)	27
Japan (Japan Hot 100)	30
Latvia (European Hit Radio)	32
Lithuania (European Hit Radio)	4
Norway (VG-lista)	20
Scotland (OCC)	9
Spain (PROMUSICAE)	45
Spain Airplay (PROMUSICAE)	18
Sweden (Sverigetopplistan)	53
UK Singles (OCC)	56
US Billboard Hot 100	37
US Pop Airplay (Billboard)	27
US Dance Club Songs (Billboard)	10
Venezuela Top Anglo (Record Report)	3

=== Monthly charts ===
Monthly chart performance for "Paranoid"
Chart (2009)	Peak position
Brazil (Brasil Hot 100 Airplay)	47

== Certifications ==
Certifications for "Paranoid"
Region	Certification	Certified units/sales
Canada (Music Canada)	Gold	40,000^{‡}
^{‡} Sales+streaming figures based on certification alone.

== Release history ==
Release dates and formats for "Paranoid"
Region	Date	Format	Label	Ref.
United States	May 12, 2009	Digital download	Hollywood	
Italy	May 15, 2009	Radio impact	Universal	
United States	May 18, 2009	Contemporary hit radio	Hollywood	
Germany	June 12, 2009	CD single	Universal	
