= S.O.S (Jonas Brothers song) =

2008 single by Jonas Brothers

Single by Jonas Brothers

from the album Jonas Brothers
- B-side: "Year 3000" (album version)
- Released: August 3, 2007
- Recorded: 2007
- Genre: Dance-rock; pop rock; power pop
- Length: 2:33
- Label: Hollywood
- Songwriter: Nick Jonas
- Producer: John Fields

Jonas Brothers singles chronology
"Hold On" (2007)	"S.O.S" (2007)	"When You Look Me in the Eyes" (2007)

Audio sample
- file; help

Music video
- "S.O.S" on YouTube

"S.O.S" is a song by American pop group Jonas Brothers. The song was released as the third single on August 3, 2007, from their self-titled second album. It was also their debut international single in Europe in May 2008 and in the United Kingdom in early June 2008.

== Background and composition ==
"S.O.S" was written from a personal experience Nick Jonas had been through. He had gone through a bad night and had a hard time, and ended up composing it into a song. In an interview with Elvis Costello, Nick said that "S.O.S" was one of the songs that came to him in the middle of the night. He wrote the song in only ten minutes. In a TikTok posted on the 15-year anniversary of the song, Nick further revealed that he wrote the song alone in a hotel room at thirteen years old. He also said that the original title was "A Call I'll Never Get", but when making the track list for the album, everyone kept calling it "S.O.S", so they ended up going with that title instead.

== Chart performance ==
In August 2007, "S.O.S" debuted at number 65 on the Billboard Hot 100. In the week following its debut, the song rose to number 17 on the Billboard Hot 100, becoming the band's first single to reach the top 20. The single sold very well digitally, having peaked at number four on Billboard's Hot Digital Songs chart for two consecutive weeks in September 2007. It has sold 1.5 million copies in the US.

In Australia, "S.O.S" debuted inside the top 50 at number 48 on the ARIA Charts on April 13, 2008. It later peaked at number 47. The song entered the German charts for the week of June 13, 2008, at number 26.

In the UK, "S.O.S" was a moderate success, entering the UK Singles Chart at number 16 and rising the next week to number 13. However, despite large amounts of video airplay, it fell 11 places to number 24 the following week. In the fourth week on the UK Singles Chart, the single dropped another eight places to number 32. The song sold 2,000,000 copies worldwide becoming one of the best-selling songs of 2007. The song was later used as the B-side to "When You Look Me in the Eyes".

== Music video ==
The music video was filmed in June 2007 on board the RMS Queen Mary, a retired ocean liner moored in Long Beach, California, and was directed by Declan Whitebloom. It premiered alongside the single, via YouTube. It also features a cameo by Moises Arias. The song is about having troubled relationships with girlfriends. In the video, Nick is seen waiting for his significant other at a restaurant table, who then arrives with two friends. He then walks off, annoyed that she was not alone. Kevin appears, walking, when he gets a text which states, "I like u...but I don't like u ):." He then throws the phone in a wastebasket. Joe approaches a girl who appears to be waving at him, but Moises Arias appears behind him and walks off with the girl instead. In the end, the brothers see three new girls and chase after them. These scenes are intercut with footage of the Jonas Brothers performing on the ship's deck in front of an electric sign that says 'S.O.S.'

== Track listing ==
US and Europe maxi CD single

1. "S.O.S" (album version) – 2:33
2. "Hello Beautiful" (live) – 3:22
3. "Year 3000" (album version) – 3:21
- "S.O.S" music video – 2:33

== Charts ==
=== Weekly charts ===
Weekly chart performance for "S.O.S"
Chart (2007–2008)	Peak position
Australia (ARIA)	47
Austria (Ö3 Austria Top 40)	33
Belgium (Ultratop 50 Flanders)	8
Belgium (Ultratop 50 Wallonia)	9
Canada Hot 100 (Billboard)	49
Colombia (EFE)	8
Costa Rica (EFE)	2
Czech Republic Airplay (ČNS IFPI)	26
Denmark (Tracklisten)	28
European Hot 100 Singles	24
Europe (European Hit Radio)	18
France (SNEP)	15
Germany (GfK)	26
Ireland (IRMA)	14
Mexico Anglo (Monitor Latino)	4
Netherlands (Dutch Top 40)	32
Netherlands (Single Top 100)	81
Norway (VG-lista)	2
Sweden (Sverigetopplistan)	28
Switzerland (Schweizer Hitparade)	66
UK Singles (Official Charts)	13
UK Airplay (Music Week)	33
US Billboard Hot 100	17
US Pop Airplay (Billboard)	24
Venezuela Pop Rock (Record Report)	6

=== Year-end charts ===
Year-end chart performance for "S.O.S"
Chart (2008)	Position
Belgium (Ultratop 50 Flanders)	57
Belgium (Ultratop 50 Wallonia)	81
France (SNEP)	61
UK Singles (OCC)	188

== Certifications ==
Certifications for "S.O.S"
Region	Certification	Certified units/sales
Canada (Music Canada)	Platinum	80,000^{‡}
United Kingdom (BPI)	Silver	200,000^{‡}
^{‡} Sales+streaming figures based on certification alone.

== Release history ==
Release dates and formats for "S.O.S"
Region	Date	Format	Label	Ref.
Germany	May 30, 2008	CD single	Universal	
United Kingdom	June 16, 2008	CD single	Polydor	
