= The Burning Up Tour =

2008–09 concert tour by the Jonas Brothers

- Continental tour by Jonas Brothers
- Promotional poster
- Location: North America
- Associated albums: A Little Bit Longer; Camp Rock
- Start date: July 4, 2008
- End date: March 22, 2009
- No. of shows: 48 in North America
- Box office: $41 million ($58.6 million adj. for 2023 inflation)

Jonas Brothers concert chronology
- When You Look Me in the Eyes Tour (2008); The Burning Up Tour (2008–09); Jonas Brothers World Tour 2009 (2009)

The Burning Up Tour was the fifth concert tour by the Jonas Brothers. This tour was to promote their third album A Little Bit Longer. This tour had also promoted the Disney Channel Original Movie, Camp Rock in which the Jonas Brothers had starred. Also, the Burning Up Tour was used to promote Disney starlet, Demi Lovato's music. The tour had started on July 4, 2008, in Toronto, and concluded on March 22, 2009, in San Juan. Honor Society, Avril Lavigne, Demi Lovato, The Veronicas, Robert Schwartzman, and Taylor Swift appeared as guest performers on select tour dates. The tour went on to gross US$41 million in 48 shows.

== Concert film ==
The shows performed in Anaheim on July 13 and 14 were filmed for the concert film Jonas Brothers: The 3D Concert Experience which was released February 27, 2009. The live soundtrack was released the same week prior to the film's release on February 24, 2009.

== Set list ==
This set list is from the concert on August 26, 2008, in Burgettstown. It may not represent all concerts for the tour.

1. "That's Just the Way We Roll"
2. "Shelf"
3. "Hold On"
4. "BB Good"
5. "Goodnight and Goodbye"
6. "Video Girl"
7. "Gotta Find You"
8. "This is Me" (with Demi Lovato)
9. "A Little Bit Longer"
10. "I'm Gonna Getcha Good! (Shania Twain cover)
11. "Still in Love with You"
12. "Tonight"
13. "Year 3000"
14. "Pushin' Me Away"
15. "Hello Beautiful"
16. "Lovebug"
17. "Can’t Have You"
18. "Play My Music"
19. "Burnin' Up"

Encore

20. "When You Look Me in the Eyes"
21. "S.O.S."

== Tour dates ==
List of 2008 concerts
Date	City	Country	Venue	Opening act(s)	Attendance	Revenue
July 4, 2008	Toronto	Canada	Molson Amphitheatre	Demi Lovato	14,778 / 16,130	$551,886
July 5, 2008	Clarkston	United States	DTE Energy Music Theatre	Demi Lovato	15,119 / 15,119	$639,722
July 6, 2008 (Note: Part of Summerfest.)	Milwaukee	United States	Marcus Amphitheater	Demi Lovato	—N/a	—N/a
July 8, 2008	Oklahoma City	United States	Ford Center	Demi Lovato	11,727 / 13,035	$640,330
July 9, 2008	Dallas	United States	SuperPages.com Center	Demi Lovato	19,993 / 19,993	$722,062
July 11, 2008	Phoenix	United States	Cricket Wireless Pavilion	Demi Lovato	16,116 / 19,874	$626,514
July 12, 2008	Irvine	United States	Verizon Wireless Amphitheatre	Demi Lovato	15,965 / 15,965	$707,738
July 13, 2008	Anaheim	United States	Honda Center	Demi Lovato	23,337 / 23,337	$905,548
July 14, 2008	Anaheim	United States	Honda Center	Demi Lovato	23,337 / 23,337	$905,548
July 15, 2008	Mountain View	United States	Shoreline Amphitheatre	Demi Lovato	—N/a	—N/a
July 16, 2008 (Note: Part of KUDL 106.5 Endfest.)	Wheatland	United States	Sleep Train Amphitheatre	Demi Lovato	—N/a	—N/a
July 17, 2008	Concord	United States	Sleep Train Pavilion	Demi Lovato	—N/a	—N/a
July 19, 2008	Greenwood Village	United States	Fiddler's Green Amphitheatre	Demi Lovato	—N/a	—N/a
July 21, 2008	Omaha	United States	Qwest Center	Demi Lovato	11,543 / 13,456	$675,530
July 22, 2008	Maryland Heights	United States	Verizon Wireless Amphitheater	Demi Lovato; Avril Lavigne	17,956 / 20,606	$687,270
July 23, 2008	Noblesville	United States	Verizon Wireless Music Center	Demi Lovato; Avril Lavigne	18,817 / 24,249	$647,086
July 25, 2008	Hershey	United States	Star Pavilion	Demi Lovato; Avril Lavigne	—N/a	—N/a
July 26, 2008	Hartford	United States	New England Dodge Music Center	Demi Lovato; Avril Lavigne	21,830 / 21,830	$801,643
July 28, 2008	Cincinnati	United States	Riverbend Music Center	Demi Lovato; Avril Lavigne	14,924 / 20,319	$648,323
July 29, 2008	Charlotte	United States	Verizon Wireless Amphitheatre	Demi Lovato; Avril Lavigne	18,647 / 18,647	$777,974
July 30, 2008	Raleigh	United States	Time Warner Cable Music Pavilion	Demi Lovato; Avril Lavigne	19,355 / 19,914	$685,949
August 1, 2008	Scranton	United States	Toyota Pavilion	Demi Lovato; Avril Lavigne	15,084 / 17,043	$571,173
August 2, 2008	Saratoga Springs	United States	Saratoga Performing Arts Center	Demi Lovato; Avril Lavigne	19,672 / 25,087	$750,248
August 6, 2008	Baltimore	United States	1st Mariner Arena	Demi Lovato	11,419 / 11,419	$701,490
August 7, 2008	Mansfield	United States	Comcast Center	Demi Lovato	19,942 / 19,942	$908,797
August 8, 2008	Wantagh	United States	Nikon at Jones Beach Theater	Demi Lovato	13,959 / 13,982	$622,590
August 9, 2008	New York City	United States	Madison Square Garden	Demi Lovato	43,243 / 43,243	$2,359,600
August 10, 2008	New York City	United States	Madison Square Garden	Demi Lovato	43,243 / 43,243	$2,359,600
August 11, 2008	New York City	United States	Madison Square Garden	Demi Lovato	43,243 / 43,243	$2,359,600
August 14, 2008	Bethel	United States	Bethel Woods Center for the Arts	Demi Lovato	15,492 / 15,492	$641,290
August 15, 2008	Darien	United States	Darien Lake Performing Arts Center	Demi Lovato	—N/a	—N/a
August 16, 2008	Holmdel Township	United States	PNC Bank Arts Center	Demi Lovato	16,874 / 16,874	$651,790
August 18, 2008	Bristow	United States	Nissan Pavilion	Demi Lovato	22,567 / 22,567	$896,437
August 19, 2008	Virginia Beach	United States	Verizon Wireless Virginia Beach Amphitheater	Demi Lovato	19,971 / 19,971	$680,802
August 20, 2008	Atlanta	United States	Lakewood Amphitheatre	Demi Lovato	18,764 / 18,764	$702,609
August 22, 2008	Cuyahoga Falls	United States	Blossom Music Center	Demi Lovato; The Veronicas; Big Rob	20,761 / 21,051	$681,320
August 23, 2008	Columbus	United States	Nationwide Arena	Demi Lovato; The Veronicas; Big Rob	14,323 / 14,323	$809,704
August 24, 2008	Tinley Park	United States	First Midwest Bank Amphitheatre	Demi Lovato; The Veronicas; Big Rob	—N/a	—N/a
August 26, 2008	Burgettstown	United States	Post-Gazette Pavilion	Demi Lovato; The Veronicas; Big Rob	22,990 / 22,990	$750,614
August 27, 2008	Camden	United States	Susquehanna Bank Center	Demi Lovato; The Veronicas; Big Rob	24,884 / 24,884	$844,078
August 29, 2008 (Note: Part of Great New York State Fair.)	Syracuse	United States	Mohegan Sun Grandstand	Demi Lovato	—N/a	—N/a
August 30, 2008 (Note: Part of Great Allentown Fair.)	Allentown	United States	Allentown Fairgrounds	Demi Lovato	—N/a	—N/a
August 31, 2008 (Note: Part of Champlain Valley Fair.)	Essex Junction	United States	Champlain Valley Fairgrounds	Demi Lovato	—N/a	—N/a
September 2, 2008	University Park	United States	Bryce Jordan Center	Demi Lovato; The Veronicas; Big Rob	10,556 / 10,556	$468,168
September 4, 2008	Tampa	United States	Ford Amphitheatre	Demi Lovato; The Veronicas; Big Rob	—N/a	—N/a
September 5, 2008	West Palm Beach	United States	Cruzan Amphitheatre	Demi Lovato; The Veronicas; Big Rob	19,137 / 19,137	$698,178
November 29, 2008	Las Vegas	United States	MGM Grand	Honor Society; Demi Lovato	—N/a	—N/a
November 30, 2008	Los Angeles	United States	Hollywood Palladium	Honor Society	—N/a	—N/a
December 20, 2008	Mexico City	Mexico	Foro Sol	Honor Society	38,365 / 38,365	$2,502,897

List of 2009 concerts
Date	City	Country	Venue	Opening act(s)	Attendance	Revenue
March 8, 2009 (Note: Part of Houston Livestock Show and Rodeo.)	Houston	United States	Reliant Stadium	—N/a	—N/a	
March 22, 2009	San Juan	Puerto Rico	José Miguel Agrelot Coliseum	—N/a	—N/a	
Total					608,075 / 655,207	$25,978,647
