= The Burning Up Tour All Over Again =

2026 concert tour by the Jonas Brothers

- Tour by Jonas Brothers
- Promotional poster
- Location: North America
- Start date: August 20, 2026
- End date: December 22, 2026
- No. of shows: 51
- Supporting acts: Deleasa; Magnus Ferrell; Franklin Jonas; All Time Low; Jamie Miller; Baylee Littrell

Jonas Brothers concert chronology
- Jonas20: Greetings from Your Hometown Tour (2025–2026); The Burning Up Tour All Over Again (2026)

The Burning Up Tour All Over Again is the fourteenth concert tour by the American pop rock band Jonas Brothers. The tour was conceptualized as a revival of the Burning Up Tour (2008–09), emulating its set list and set pieces, plus a new set of songs, featuring other hits from the band's catalog. The tour commenced on August 20, 2026, at Madison Square Garden, in New York City, and is set to conclude on December 22, 2026, in Newark, New Jersey, consisting of 51 concerts.

== Background ==
On July 7, 2026, the band announced two nights at Madison Square Garden in New York City that was promoted as "The Burning Up Tour: All Over Again" set for August 20 and 21, 2026. Due to overwhelming demand, a third night set for August 22 was announced.

The tour was officially announced by the band on August 17, 2026, making its way across 45 cities in North America. Tickets went on sale on August 21, 2026.

On August 25, second shows were added in Los Angeles and Newark due to high demand.

== Set list ==
This set list is from the concert in New York City on August 20, 2026.

1. "That's Just the Way We Roll"
2. "Shelf"
3. "Hold On"
4. "BB Good"
5. "Goodnight and Goodbye"
6. "Video Girl"
7. "Gotta Find You" / "This is Me"
8. "Got Me Going Crazy" (video interlude)
9. "A Little Bit Longer"
10. "Still in Love with You"
11. "Tonight"
12. "Year 3000"
13. "Pushin' Me Away"
14. "Lovebug"
15. "Can’t Have You"
16. "Play My Music"
17. "When You Look Me in the Eyes"
18. "S.O.S"
19. "Burnin' Up"

Intermission

20. "Backwards"
21. "Love Me to Heaven"
22. "Waffle House"
23. "Cake by the Ocean"
24. "Jealous"
25. "Changing"
26. "Cool"
27. "Listen When Sad"
28. "Only Human"
29. "What a Man Gotta Do"
30. "Leave Before You Love Me"
31. "Sucker"
32. "Burnin' Up"

=== Surprise guests and set list alterations ===
- During the October 5, 2026 concert in Miami, "¿Cómo Pasó?" was performed with Ela Taubert.
- During the November 18, 2026, concert in Los Angeles, "I Won't Cry" and "When You Look Me in the Eyes" were performed with Remi Wolf.

== Tour dates ==
List of 2026 concerts, showing date, city, country, venue, and supporting acts
| Date (2026) | City | Country | Venue | Support act(s) |
|---|---|---|---|---|
| August 20 | New York City | United States | Madison Square Garden | Deleasa |
| August 21 | New York City | United States | Madison Square Garden | Deleasa |
| August 22 | New York City | United States | Madison Square Garden | Deleasa |
| September 25 | Boston | United States | TD Garden | Magnus Ferrell; Deleasa |
| September 26 | Manchester | United States | SNHU Arena | Jamie Miller; Deleasa |
| September 28 | Toronto | Canada | RBC Amphitheatre | Jamie Miller; Deleasa |
| September 30 | Washington, D.C. | United States | Capital One Arena | Jamie Miller; Deleasa |
| October 1 | Raleigh | United States | Lenovo Center | Jamie Miller; Deleasa |
| October 2 | Philadelphia | United States | Xfinity Mobile Arena | Magnus Ferrell; Deleasa |
| October 5 | Miami | United States | Kaseya Center | Magnus Ferrell; Deleasa |
| October 6 | Orlando | United States | Kia Center | Magnus Ferrell; Deleasa |
| October 8 | Atlanta | United States | State Farm Arena | Baylee Littrell; Magnus Ferrell; Deleasa |
| October 11 | Tampa | United States | Benchmark International Arena | Baylee Littrell; Magnus Ferrell; Deleasa |
| October 13 | Charlotte | United States | Spectrum Center | Baylee Littrell; Magnus Ferrell; Deleasa |
| October 15 | Indianapolis | United States | Gainbridge Fieldhouse | Baylee Littrell; Magnus Ferrell; Deleasa |
| October 16 | Columbus | United States | Nationwide Arena | Baylee Littrell; Magnus Ferrell; Deleasa |
| October 17 | Lexington | United States | Rupp Arena | Baylee Littrell; Magnus Ferrell; Deleasa |
| October 19 | Cleveland | United States | Rocket Arena | Baylee Littrell; Magnus Ferrell; Deleasa |
| October 20 | Buffalo | United States | KeyBank Center | Baylee Littrell; Magnus Ferrell; Deleasa |
| October 22 | Rosemont | United States | Allstate Arena | Baylee Littrell; Magnus Ferrell; Deleasa |
| October 24 | Toronto | Canada | Scotiabank Arena | Baylee Littrell; Magnus Ferrell; Deleasa |
| October 25 | Detroit | United States | Little Caesars Arena | Baylee Littrell; Magnus Ferrell; Deleasa |
| October 26 | Pittsburgh | United States | PPG Paints Arena | Baylee Littrell; Magnus Ferrell; Deleasa |
| November 1 | Milwaukee | United States | Fiserv Forum | Magnus Ferrell; Deleasa |
| November 2 | Saint Paul | United States | Grand Casino Arena | Magnus Ferrell; Deleasa |
| November 3 | Kansas City | United States | T-Mobile Center | Franklin Jonas; Deleasa |
| November 5 | Nashville | United States | Bridgestone Arena | Franklin Jonas; Deleasa |
| November 6 | Birmingham | United States | Legacy Arena | Franklin Jonas; Deleasa |
| November 8 | Houston | United States | Toyota Center | Franklin Jonas; Deleasa |
| November 9 | Oklahoma City | United States | Paycom Center | Franklin Jonas; Deleasa |
| November 10 | Dallas | United States | American Airlines Center | Franklin Jonas; Deleasa |
| November 13 | Austin | United States | Moody Center | Franklin Jonas; Deleasa |
| November 14 | San Antonio | United States | Frost Bank Center | Franklin Jonas; Deleasa |
| November 17 | Thousand Palms | United States | Acrisure Arena | Magnus Ferrell; Deleasa |
| November 18 | Los Angeles | United States | Hollywood Bowl | All Time Low; Magnus Ferrell; Deleasa |
| November 19 | Los Angeles | United States | Hollywood Bowl | All Time Low; Magnus Ferrell; Deleasa |
| November 21 | San Francisco | United States | Chase Center | Magnus Ferrell; Deleasa |
| November 22 | Sacramento | United States | Golden 1 Center | Magnus Ferrell; Deleasa |
| November 27 | Glendale | United States | Desert Diamond Arena | Magnus Ferrell; Deleasa |
| November 28 | Paradise | United States | MGM Grand Garden Arena | Magnus Ferrell; Deleasa |
| November 30 | San Diego | United States | Viejas Arena | Magnus Ferrell; Deleasa |
| December 2 | Anaheim | United States | Honda Center | Magnus Ferrell; Deleasa |
| December 5 | Seattle | United States | Climate Pledge Arena | Magnus Ferrell; Deleasa |
| December 7 | Salt Lake City | United States | Delta Center | Magnus Ferrell; Deleasa |
| December 9 | Denver | United States | Ball Arena | Magnus Ferrell; Deleasa |
| December 10 | Lincoln | United States | Pinnacle Bank Arena | Magnus Ferrell; Deleasa |
| December 12 | Sioux Falls | United States | Denny Sanford Premier Center | Magnus Ferrell; Deleasa |
| December 15 | Grand Rapids | United States | Van Andel Arena | Magnus Ferrell; Deleasa |
| December 19 | Elmont | United States | UBS Arena | Magnus Ferrell; Deleasa |
| December 21 | Newark | United States | Prudential Center | Magnus Ferrell; Deleasa |
| December 22 | Newark | United States | Prudential Center | Magnus Ferrell; Deleasa |

== Postponed concerts ==
List of postponed concerts
| Date (2026) | City | Country | Venue | Reason |
|---|---|---|---|---|
| October 9 | Birmingham | United States | Legacy Arena | Inclement weather |
