= List of songs written and produced by Nick Jonas =

The following list is a discography of production by Nick Jonas, an American singer and record producer. It includes a list of songs produced, co-produced and written sorted by year, artist, album and title.

== Songwriting and production credits ==
Title	Year	Artist	Album	Notes
"Jump Shout"	2006	Tiffany Giardina	We've Got Christmas	Writer
"Time For Me To Fly"	2006	Jonas Brothers	It's About Time	Writer
"One Day at a Time"	2006	Jonas Brothers	It's About Time	Writer
"Mandy"	2006	Jonas Brothers	It's About Time	Writer
"You Just Don't Know It"	2006	Jonas Brothers	It's About Time	Writer
"Underdog"	2006	Jonas Brothers	It's About Time	Writer
"7:05"	2006	Jonas Brothers	It's About Time	Writer
"Please Be Mine"	2006	Jonas Brothers	It's About Time	Writer
"Don't Tell Anyone"	2006	Jonas Brothers	—N/a	Writer
"SOS"	2007	Jonas Brothers	Jonas Brothers	Writer
"Hold On"	2007	Jonas Brothers	Jonas Brothers	Writer
"Goodnight and Goodbye"	2007	Jonas Brothers	Jonas Brothers	Writer
"That's Just the Way we Roll"	2007	Jonas Brothers	Jonas Brothers	Writer
"Hello Beautiful"	2007	Jonas Brothers	Jonas Brothers	Writer
"Still in Love with You"	2007	Jonas Brothers	Jonas Brothers	Writer
"Australia"	2007	Jonas Brothers	Jonas Brothers	Writer
"Games"	2007	Jonas Brothers	Jonas Brothers	Writer
"When You Look Me in the Eyes"	2007	Jonas Brothers	Jonas Brothers	Writer
"Inseparable"	2007	Jonas Brothers	Jonas Brothers	Writer
"Just Friends"	2007	Jonas Brothers	Jonas Brothers	Writer
"Hollywood"	2007	Jonas Brothers	Jonas Brothers	Writer
"Take a Breath"	2007	Jonas Brothers	Jonas Brothers	Writer
"Out of This World"	2007	Jonas Brothers	Jonas Brothers	Writer
"La La Land"	2008	Demi Lovato	Don't Forget	Writer, producer
"Get Back"	2008	Demi Lovato	Don't Forget	Writer, producer
"On The Line"	2008	Demi Lovato	Don't Forget	Writer, producer
"Don't Forget"	2008	Demi Lovato	Don't Forget	Writer, producer
"Gonna Get Caught"	2008	Demi Lovato	Don't Forget	Writer, producer
"Two Worlds Collide"	2008	Demi Lovato	Don't Forget	Writer, producer
"Back Around"	2008	Demi Lovato	Don't Forget	Writer, producer
"Behind Enemy Lines"	2008	Demi Lovato	Don't Forget	Writer, producer
"BB Good"	2008	Jonas Brothers	A Little Bit Longer	Writer
"Burnin' Up"	2008	Jonas Brothers	A Little Bit Longer	Writer
"Shelf"	2008	Jonas Brothers	A Little Bit Longer	Writer
"One Man Show"	2008	Jonas Brothers	A Little Bit Longer	Writer
"Lovebug"	2008	Jonas Brothers	A Little Bit Longer	Writer
"Tonight"	2008	Jonas Brothers	A Little Bit Longer	Writer
"Can't Have You"	2008	Jonas Brothers	A Little Bit Longer	Writer
"Video Girl"	2008	Jonas Brothers	A Little Bit Longer	Writer
"Pushin' Me Away"	2008	Jonas Brothers	A Little Bit Longer	Writer
"Sorry"	2008	Jonas Brothers	A Little Bit Longer	Writer
"Got Me Going Crazy"	2008	Jonas Brothers	A Little Bit Longer	Writer
"A Little Bit Longer"	2008	Jonas Brothers	A Little Bit Longer	Writer
"Live to Party"	2008	Jonas Brothers	A Little Bit Longer	Writer
"Infatuation"	2008	Jonas Brothers	A Little Bit Longer	Writer
"Over You"	2009	Honor Society	Fashionably Late	Writer, producer
"My Own Way"	2009	Honor Society	Fashionably Late	Writer, producer
"Sing For You"	2009	Honor Society	Fashionably Late	Writer
"Rock With You"	2009	Honor Society	Fashionably Late	Writer
"Stop The World"	2009	Demi Lovato	Here We Go Again	Writer
"Love Is On Its Way"	2009	Jonas Brothers	Music from the 3D Concert Experience	Writer
"World War III"	2009	Jonas Brothers	Lines, Vines and Trying Times	Writer
"Paranoid"	2009	Jonas Brothers	Lines, Vines and Trying Times	Writer
"Fly with Me"	2009	Jonas Brothers	Lines, Vines and Trying Times	Writer
"Poison Ivy"	2009	Jonas Brothers	Lines, Vines and Trying Times	Writer
"Hey Baby"	2009	Jonas Brothers	Lines, Vines and Trying Times	Writer
"Before the Storm"	2009	Jonas Brothers	Lines, Vines and Trying Times	Writer
"What Did I Do to Your Heart"	2009	Jonas Brothers	Lines, Vines and Trying Times	Writer
"Much Better"	2009	Jonas Brothers	Lines, Vines and Trying Times	Writer
"Black Keys"	2009	Jonas Brothers	Lines, Vines and Trying Times	Writer
"Don't Charge Me for the Crime"	2009	Jonas Brothers	Lines, Vines and Trying Times	Writer
"Turn Right"	2009	Jonas Brothers	Lines, Vines and Trying Times	Writer
"Don't Speak"	2009	Jonas Brothers	Lines, Vines and Trying Times	Writer
"Keep It Real"	2009	Jonas Brothers	Lines, Vines and Trying Times	Writer
"L.A. Baby (Where Dreams Are Made Of)"	2010	Jonas Brothers	Jonas L.A.	Writer
"Your Biggest Fan"	2010	Jonas Brothers	Jonas L.A.	Writer
"Things Will Never Be the Same"	2010	Jonas Brothers	Jonas L.A.	Writer
"Fall"	2010	Jonas Brothers	Jonas L.A.	Writer
"Drive"	2010	Jonas Brothers	Jonas L.A.	Writer
"Invisible"	2010	Jonas Brothers	Jonas L.A.	Writer
"Make It Right"	2010	Jonas Brothers	Jonas L.A.	Writer
"Set This Party Off"	2010	Jonas Brothers	Jonas L.A.	Writer
"One Day"	2011	Charice	Infinity	Writer, producer
"My Time"	2011	Gabrielle Giguere	—N/a	Producer
"Safe To Believe"	2012	Delta Goodrem	Child of the Universe	Writer
"Reaching For Something"	2012	Delta Goodrem	—N/a	Writer
"This Is Where We Belong"	2012	Delta Goodrem	—N/a	Writer
"Love You Forever"	2013	Zendaya	Zendaya	Writer, producer
"First Time"	2013	Jonas Brothers	LiVe	Writer, producer
"Pom Poms"	2013	Jonas Brothers	LiVe	Writer, producer
"Neon"	2013	Jonas Brothers	LiVe	Writer, producer
"The World"	2013	Jonas Brothers	LiVe	Writer, producer
"Wedding Bells"	2013	Jonas Brothers	LiVe	Writer, producer
"What Do I Mean"	2013	Jonas Brothers	LiVe	Writer, producer
"Found"	2013	Jonas Brothers	LiVe	Writer, producer
"Parachute"	2014	Olivia Somerlyn	—N/a	Writer, producer
"Breathe in Breathe out"	2014	Tich	—N/a	Writer
"Sunday Morning"	2016	Kevin Hart	Kevin Hart: What Now? (The Mixtape Presents Chocolate Droppa)	Writer
"Ready For Ya"	2017	Demi Lovato	Tell Me You Love Me	Writer
"Home"	2017	Nick Jonas	Ferdinand (Music from the Motion Picture)	Writer
"Watch Me"	2017	Nick Jonas	Ferdinand (Music from the Motion Picture)	Writer
"Sucker"	2019	Jonas Brothers	Happiness Begins	Writer
"Cool"	2019	Jonas Brothers	Happiness Begins	Writer
"Only Human"	2019	Jonas Brothers	Happiness Begins	Writer
"I Believe"	2019	Jonas Brothers	Happiness Begins	Writer
"Used to Be"	2019	Jonas Brothers	Happiness Begins	Writer
"Every Single Time"	2019	Jonas Brothers	Happiness Begins	Writer
"Don't Throw It Away"	2019	Jonas Brothers	Happiness Begins	Writer
"Love Her"	2019	Jonas Brothers	Happiness Begins	Writer
"Happy When I'm Sad"	2019	Jonas Brothers	Happiness Begins	Writer
"Trust"	2019	Jonas Brothers	Happiness Begins	Writer
"Strangers"	2019	Jonas Brothers	Happiness Begins	Writer
"Comeback"	2019	Jonas Brothers	Happiness Begins	Writer
"Jersey"	2019	Jonas Brothers	Music from Chasing Happiness	Writer
"Runaway"	2019	Sebastián Yatra, Daddy Yankee, Natti Natasha, Jonas Brothers	Dharma	Writer
"Lonely"	2019	Diplo, Jonas Brothers	Diplo Presents Thomas Wesley, Chapter 1: Snake Oil	Writer
"Like It's Christmas"	2019	Jonas Brothers	—N/a	Writer
"What A Man Gotta Do"	2020	Jonas Brothers	—N/a	Writer
"X"	2020	Jonas Brothers, Karol G	—N/a	Writer
"Five More Minutes"	2020	Jonas Brothers	—N/a	Writer
"HER"	2021	Jordan Mcgraw	—N/a	Writer
"Remember This"	2021	Jonas Brothers	—N/a	Writer
"Who's in Your Head"	2021	Jonas Brothers	—N/a	Writer
"Mercy"	2021	Jonas Brothers	Space Jam: A New Legacy	Writer
"Maan Meri Jaan (Afterlife)"	2023	Nick Jonas, King	—N/a	Writer
"Wings"	2023	Jonas Brothers	The Album	Writer
"Waffle House"	2023	Jonas Brothers	The Album	Writer
"Miracle"	2023	Jonas Brothers	The Album	Writer
"Montana Sky"	2023	Jonas Brothers	The Album	Writer
"Sail Away"	2023	Jonas Brothers	The Album	Writer
"Americana"	2023	Jonas Brothers	The Album	Writer
"Celebrate!"	2023	Jonas Brothers	The Album	Writer
"Vacation Eyes"	2023	Jonas Brothers	The Album	Writer
"Summer In The Hamptons"	2023	Jonas Brothers	The Album	Writer
"Summer Baby"	2023	Jonas Brothers	The Album	Writer
"Little Bird"	2023	Jonas Brothers	The Album	Writer
"Walls"	2023	Jonas Brothers, Jon Bellion	The Album	Writer
"I Hate Love"	2023	Kelly Clarkson, Steve Martin	Chemistry	Writer
"Do It Like That"	2023	Tomorrow X Together	—N/a	Writer
"this is what forever feels like"	2024	Nick Jonas, JVKE	—N/a	Writer
"Intro"	2024	Jonas Brothers	Live from the O2 London	Writer, producer
"When You Know (Live From The O2 London)"	2024	Jonas Brothers	Live from the O2 London	Writer, producer
"I Can't Lose"	2025	Jonas Brothers	Greetings from Your Hometown	Writer
"Tables"	2025	Jonas Brothers	Greetings from Your Hometown	Writer
"Love Me to Heaven"	2025	Jonas Brothers	Greetings from Your Hometown	Writer
"No Time to Talk"	2025	Jonas Brothers	Greetings from Your Hometown	Writer
"Greetings from Your Hometown"	2025	Jonas Brothers	Greetings from Your Hometown	Writer
"When You Know"	2025	Jonas Brothers	Greetings from Your Hometown	Writer
"Bully"	2025	Jonas Brothers	Greetings from Your Hometown	Writer
"Waste No Time"	2025	Jonas Brothers	Greetings from Your Hometown	Writer
"Lucky"	2025	Jonas Brothers	Greetings from Your Hometown	Writer
"Star"	2025	Jonas Brothers	Greetings from Your Hometown	Writer
"Coming Home This Christmas"	2025	Jonas Brothers	A Very Jonas Christmas Movie (Original Soundtrack)	Writer

== See also ==
- List of songs recorded by Nick Jonas
