= List of awards and nominations received by the Jonas Brothers =

Jonas Brothers awards and nominations
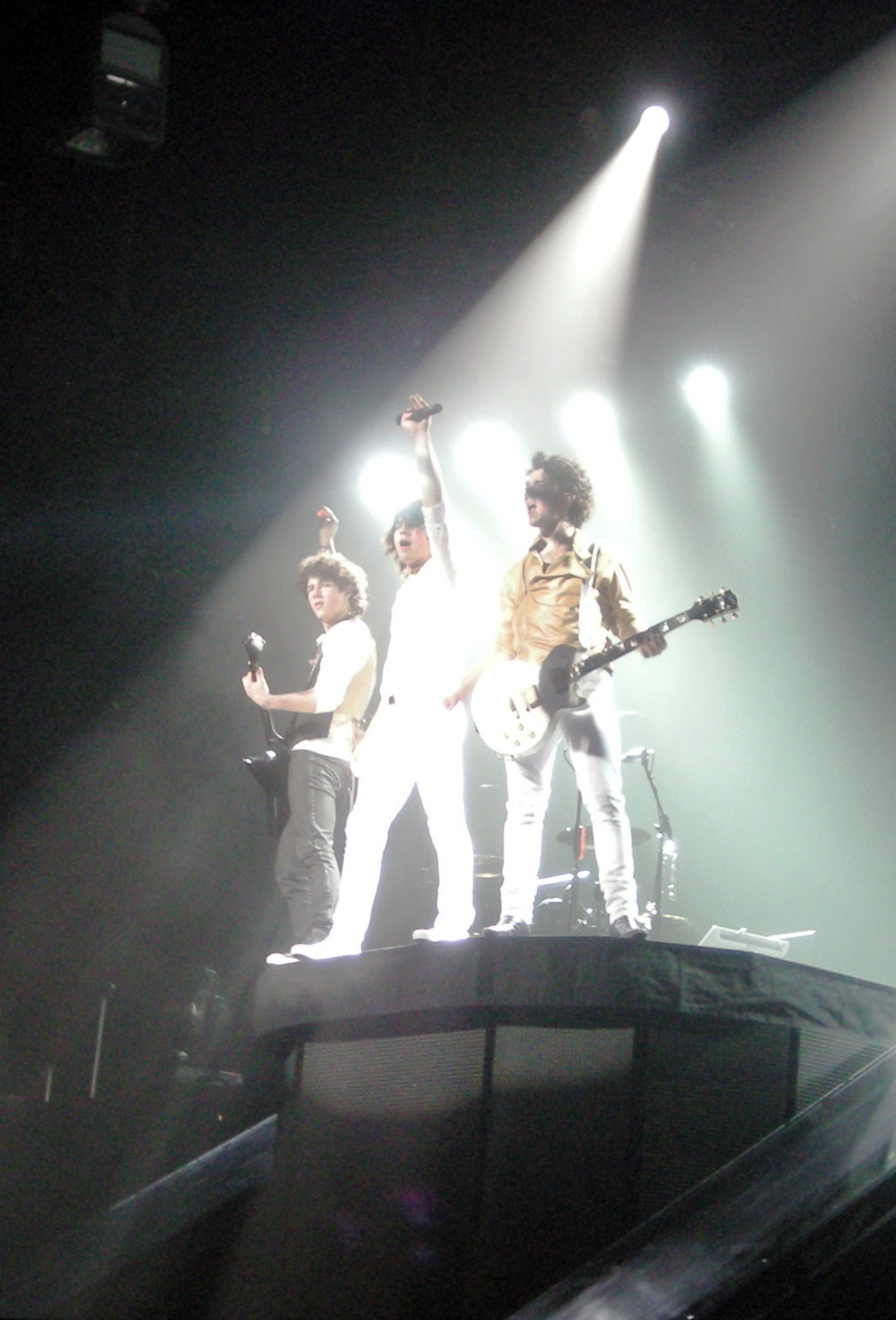
- Jonas Brothers in 2008 concert
Awards and nominations
Award	Wins	Nominations
American Music Awards	2	5
ASCAP Pop Music Awards	2	2
Billboard Music Awards	3	4
Billboard Live Music Awards	2	3
BMI Pop Awards	7	7
Clio Awards	2	2
Guinness World Records	1	1
Grammy Awards	0	2
iHeartRadio MMVAs	2	4
iHeartRadio Music Awards	1	9
iHeartRadio Titanium Awards	2	2
Los 40 Music Awards	1	4
MTV Europe Music Awards	0	6
MTV Italian Music Awards	3	4
MTV Millennial Awards	0	1
MTV Millennial Awards Brazil	0	2
MTV Video Music Awards	1	14
Nickelodeon Australian Kids' Choice Awards	0	3
Nickelodeon Italian Kids' Choice Awards	2	2
Nickelodeon Mexico Kids' Choice Awards	0	6
Nickelodeon Kids' Choice Awards	2	16
NRJ Music Awards	2	4
People's Choice Awards	1	7
Pollstar Awards	1	4
Shorty Awards	2	6
Teen Choice Awards	17	26

Totals (Note: Certain award groups do not simply award one winner. They acknowledge several different recipients, have runners-up, and have third place. Since this is a specific recognition and is different from losing an award, runner-up mentions are considered wins in this award tally. For simplification and to avoid errors, each award in this list has been presumed to have had a prior nomination.)
- Wins: 107
- Nominations: 227

The Jonas Brothers are an American pop rock band from Wyckoff, New Jersey. They are currently signed with Republic Records. They have released seven albums to date, It's About Time, Jonas Brothers, A Little Bit Longer, Lines, Vines, and Trying Times, Happiness Begins, The Album, and Greetings from Your Hometown.

The Jonas Brothers have received numerous awards and nominations throughout their career. They rose to prominence in the mid-2000s for their work with Hollywood Records and the Walt Disney Company. Since their debut, the bands music has garnered 51 #1 placements on official Billboard charts and have earned multiple wins at the Billboard Music Awards, MTV Video Music Awards, American Music Awards, iHeart Radio Music Awards and more. The group has been nominated for multiple Grammy Awards including for Best New Artist in 2009. They have been recognized for their work in TV and film, receiving People's Choice, Teen Choice, and ASTRA nominations, as well as their Disney Channel original TV series JONAS receiving an Emmy nomination in 2010.

Since 2005, the group has been recognized for their impact on pop culture and the entertainment and touring industries. In 2008, they became the youngest act in history to sign a deal with Live Nation Entertainment, the biggest live entertainment group in the world. That same year the group set a Guinness World Record for most singles to enter directly into the US Top 20 by a group with 5, which remains unbroken. In 2019, the band received the Decade Award from the Teen Choice Awards, recognizing their impact on pop culture and the entertainment industry as teen idols; with 17 wins, they are the 6th-most awarded act in the awards' history. That same year the group also received the NRJ Award of Honour to commemorate their chart-topping reunion. In 2023, the band was honored with both a star on the Hollywood Walk of Fame and the SoundExchange Hall of Fame Award. In 2025, the group was inducted into the New Jersey Hall of Fame, making them the youngest male inductees ever. The same year the group had their hand and footprints immortalized at the iconic TCL Theater, recognizing their 20 year career in music, television, and film. Rolling Stone Magazine named the trio one of the best Boy Bands of All Time and VH1 named them 3 of the Greatest Kid Stars' Of All Time.

== Adweek Awards ==
The Adweek Creator Visionary Awards is an awards ceremony that honors the innovators and influencers who have "not only entertained us, but also wholly shifted the approach to marketing, media and connection."

Year	Nominee / work	Award	Result
2023	Themselves	Celebrity Crossover Award	Won

== American Music Awards ==
The American Music Awards is an annual awards ceremony created by Dick Clark in 1973 and one of several annual major American music awards shows (among the others are the Grammy Awards, the MTV Video Music Awards etc.). Jonas Brothers have received five nominations and won twice.

Year	Nominee / work	Award	Result
2008	Themselves	T-Mobile Breakthrough Artist	Won
2019	Themselves	Favorite Duo or Group – Pop/Rock	Nominated
2019	"Sucker"	Favorite Song – Pop/Rock	Nominated
2020	Themselves	Favorite Duo or Group - Pop/Rock	Nominated
2020	Themselves	Favorite Artist - Adult Contemporary	Won

== ASCAP Pop Music Awards ==
Organized by the American Society of Composers, Authors and Publishers (ASCAP), the ASCAP Music Awards program honors the most-performed and outstanding songs written and their writers.

Year	Nominee / work	Award	Result
2020	“Sucker”	Song of the Year	Won
2020	"Only Human"	Award Winning Songs	Won

== ASTRA Awards ==
The ASTRA Awards were the annual awards for the Australian subscription television industry. The awards "recognize the wealth of talent that drives the Australian subscription television industry and highlight the creativity, commitment and investment in production and broadcasting."

Year	Nominee / work	Award	Result
2009	Themselves	Favourite International Personality or Actor	Nominated

== BBC Radio 1 Teen Awards ==
The BBC Radio 1 Teen Awards is an annual awards ceremony held in London that celebrates the best music and acting in the United Kingdom.

Year	Nominee / work	Award	Result
2019	Themselves	Best Group	Nominated

== Billboard ==
=== Billboard Music Awards ===
The Billboard Music Awards is an honor given out annually by Billboard, a publication and music popularity chart covering the music business.

Year	Nominee / work	Award	Result	Ref.
2020	Themselves	Top Artist	Nominated	
2020	Themselves	Top Duo/Group	Won	
2020	Themselves	Top Radio Songs Artist	Won	
2020	"Sucker"	Top Radio Song	Won	

=== Billboard Touring Music Awards ===
The Billboard Touring Award is an annual award hosted by Billboard. The Jonas Brothers have received 3 nominations, winning two.

Year	Nominee / work	Award	Result
2008	Jonas Brothers and Burger King	Concert Marketing and Promotion	Won
2009	Jonas Brothers World Tour 2009	Eventful Fans' Choice Award	Won
2009	Jonas Brothers World Tour 2009	Top Package	Nominated

== BMI Awards ==
=== BMI Pop Awards ===
The BMI Pop Awards are presented annually by Broadcast Music, Inc., honoring the songwriters, composers, and music publishers of the biggest pop songs of the year.

Year	Nominee / work	Award	Result	Ref.
2020	“Cool”	Most Performed Song of the Year	Won	
2020	“Sucker”	Most Performed Song of the Year	Won	
2021	“Only Human”	Most Performed Song of the Year	Won	
2021	“What a Man Gotta Do”	Most Performed Song of the Year	Won	
2022	"Leave Before You Love Me"	Most Performed Song of the Year	Won	
2023	"Who's In Your Head"	Most Performed Song of the Year	Won	
2025	"Waffle House"	Most Performed Song of the Year	Won	

=== BMI London Awards ===
The BMI London Awards are presented annually by Broadcast Music, Inc., honor the music creators responsible for the most performed songs of the past year in the U.K.

Year	Nominee / work	Award	Result	Ref.
2009	"Year 3000"	Most Performed Song of the Year	Won	
2021	"What a Man Gotta Do"	Most Performed Song of the Year	Won	

== Bravo Otto ==
The Bravo Otto is a German accolade honoring excellence of performers in film, television and music in Germany. The award is presented in gold, silver and bronze.

Year	Nominee / work	Award	Result	Ref.
2009	Themselves	Super Band	Silver	
2010	Themselves	Super Band	Silver	
2019	Themselves	Gruppe/Duo	Nominated	
2020	Themselves	Gruppe/Duo	Silver	

== Breaktudo Awards ==
Year	Nominee / work	Award	Result	Ref.
2020	Themselves	International Duo/Group	Nominated	

== British LGBT Awards ==
Year	Nominee / work	Award	Result	Ref.
2020	Themselves	Celebrity Ally	Nominated	

== Clio Awards ==
The Clio Awards is an annual award program that recognizes innovation and creative excellence in advertising, design, and communication, as judged by an international panel of advertising professionals.

Year	Nominee / work	Award	Result	Ref.
2020	“What a Man Gotta Do”	Bronze Winner	Won	
2024	The Album	Silver Winner	Won	

== Global Awards ==
The Global Awards are held by Global and reward music played on British radio stations including Capital, Capital XTRA, Heart, Classic FM, Smooth, Radio X, LBC and Gold, with the awards categories reflecting the songs, artists, programmes and news aired on each station. Jonas Brothers have received five nominations.

Year	Nominee / work	Award	Result
2020	Themselves	Best Group	Won
2021	Themselves	Best Group	Nominated
2022	Themselves	Best Group	Nominated
2024	Themselves	Best Group	Nominated
2024	Themselves	Best Pop	Nominated

== Golden Raspberry Awards ==
The Golden Raspberry Awards are awarded annually and are held concurrently to the Academy Awards. The "Razzies," as they are informally called, honour the year's worst in film. The Jonas Brothers have been nominated for two awards and won one.

Year	Nominee / work	Award	Result
2009	Themselves (Jonas Brothers: The 3D Concert Experience)	Worst Actor	Won
2009	Any two (or more) Jonas Brothers (Jonas Brothers: The 3D Concert Experience)	Worst Screen Couple	Nominated

== Grammy Awards ==
The Grammy Awards are awarded annually by the National Academy of Recording Arts and Sciences of the United States. The Jonas Brothers have received two nominations.

Year	Nominee / work	Award	Result	Ref.
2009	Themselves	Best New Artist	Nominated	
2020	"Sucker"	Best Pop Duo/Group Performance	Nominated	

== iHeartRadio Music Awards ==
The iHeartRadio Music Awards is an international music awards show founded by iHeartRadio in 2014. The Jonas Brothers has been received nine nominations, winning one award.

Year	Nominee / work	Award	Result	Ref.
2020	"Sucker"	Song of the Year	Nominated	
2020	"Sucker"	Best Music Video	Nominated	
2020	Themselves	Best Duo/Group of the Year	Won	
2021	Themselves	Best Duo/Group of the Year	Nominated	
2024	Themselves	Favorite Tour Style	Nominated	
2024	Themselves	Best Duo/Group of the Year	Nominated	
2026	Themselves	Favorite On Screen	Nominated	
2026	Jonas20: Greetings from Your Hometown Tour: Surprise Special Guests	Favorite Tour Tradition	Nominated	
2026	A Very Jonas Christmas Movie (Original Soundtrack)	Favorite Soundtrack	Nominated	

== iHeartRadio Titanium Awards ==
iHeartRadio Titanium Awards are awarded to an artist when their song reaches 1 Billion Spins across iHeartRadio Stations.

Year	Nominee/Work		Result	Ref
2020	"Sucker"	1 Billion Total Audience Spins on iHeartRadio Stations	Won	
2020	"Only Human"	1 Billion Total Audience Spins on iHeartRadio Stations	Won	

== LOS40 Music Awards ==
The LOS40 Music Awards is an annual awards established in 2006 by the Spanish music radio Los 40 Principales.

Year	Nominee / work	Award	Result	Ref.
2019	Themselves	Best International Artist	Won	
2019	Happiness Begins	Best International Album	Nominated	
2019	"Sucker"	Best International Song	Nominated	
2019	"Sucker"	Best International Video	Nominated	

== MTV ==
=== Los Premios MTV Latinoamérica ===
Los Premios MTV Latinoamérica is the Latin American version of the MTV Video Music Awards. The Jonas Brothers have received nine nominations, winning five. Joe Jonas and Nick Jonas, both received an individual award for the Best Fashionista (Most Fashionable) in 2008 and 2009 respectively.

Year	Nominee / work	Award	Result
2008	Themselves	Mejor Artista Pop Internacional (Best International Pop Artist)	Won
2008	Themselves	Mejor Artista Nuevo Internacional (Best International New Artist)	Nominated
2008	Themselves	Mejor Fanclub (Best Fanclub)	Nominated
2008	"When You Look Me in the Eyes"	Canción del Año (Song of the Year)	Nominated
2008	"When You Look Me in the Eyes"	Mejor Ringtone (Best Ringtone)	Nominated
2008	Joe Jonas	Best Fashionista (Most Fashionable)	Won
2009	Nick Jonas	Best Fashionista (Most Fashionable)	Won
2009	Themselves	Mejor Fanclub (Best Fanclub)	Nominated
2009	Themselves	Mejor Artista Pop Internacional (Best International Pop Artist)	Won

=== MTV Europe Music Awards ===
The MTV Europe Music Awards is an annual awards ceremony established in 1994 by MTV Europe. The Jonas Brothers have received six nominations.

Year	Nominee / work	Award	Result
2008	Themselves	New Act	Nominated
2009	Themselves	Best Group	Nominated
2019	Themselves	Best Group	Nominated
2019	Themselves	Best Pop	Nominated
2021	Themselves	Best Group	Nominated
2023	Themselves	Best Group	Nominated

=== MTV Italian Music Awards ===
The MTV Italian Music Awards (known as TRL Awards from 2006 to 2012) were established in 2006 by MTV Italy, awarding the most popular artists and music videos in Italy.

Year	Nominee / work	Award	Result
2008	"S.O.S."	Tormentone Dell'anno	Won
2008	Themselves	Best TRL Artist of the Year	Nominated
2009	Themselves	Best Cartello	Won
2009	Themselves	Best Event in Milan	Won

=== MTV MIAW Awards ===
The MTV Millennial Awards (commonly abbreviated as a MIAW) is an annual program of Latin American music awards, presented by the cable channel MTV Latin America to honor the best of Latin music and the digital world of the millennial generation.

Year	Nominee / work	Award	Result	Ref.
2019	"Sucker"	Global Hit	Nominated	

=== MTV Millennial Awards Brazil ===
The MTV Millennial Awards Brazil were held the first time in 2018. The awards are the Brazilian version of the Latin MTV Millennial Awards.

Year	Nominee / work	Award	Result	Ref.
2019	"Sucker"	Global Hit	Nominated	
2019	Themselves	Came back with everything!	Nominated	

=== MTV Video Play Awards ===
Year	Nominee / work	Award	Result	Ref.
2019	“Sucker”	Winning Video	Won	

=== MTV Video Music Awards ===
The MTV Video Music Awards is an annual awards ceremony established in 1984 by MTV. The Jonas brothers have received fourteen nominations.

Year	Nominee / work	Award	Result
2008	"Burnin' Up"	Best Pop Video	Nominated
2008	"Burnin' Up"	Video of the Year	Nominated
2019	"Sucker"	Video of the Year	Nominated
2019	"Sucker"	Song of the Year	Nominated
2019	"Sucker"	Best Pop	Won
2019	"Sucker"	Song of Summer	Nominated
2019	Themselves	Artist of the Year	Nominated
2019	Themselves	Best Group	Nominated
2020	"What a Man Gotta Do"	Best Pop	Nominated
2021	Themselves	Best Group	Nominated
2023	"Waffle House"	Best Choreography	Nominated
2023	Themselves	Best Group	Nominated
2023	"Do It Like That" with Tomorrow X Together	Song of the Summer	Nominated
2025	Themselves	Best Group	Nominated

== MuchMusic Video Awards ==
The MuchMusic Video Awards is an annual awards ceremony presented by the Canadian music video channel MuchMusic. The Jonas Brothers have received three nominations, winning two.

Year	Nominee / work	Award	Result
2009	"Lovebug"	International Video of the Year - Group	Nominated
2009	"Burnin' Up"	UR Fave: International Video - Group	Won
2010	"Paranoid"	International Video of the Year - Group	Won
2013	"Pom Poms"	International Video of the Year - Group	Nominated

== MYX Music Awards ==
The Myx Music Awards are accolades presented by the cable channel Myx to honor the biggest hits and hit makers in the Philippines. The Jonas Brothers have received two nominations.

Year	Nominee / work	Award	Result
2009	"When You Look Me in the Eyes"	International Video of the Year	Nominated
2020	"Sucker"	International Video of the Year	Nominated

== New Music Awards ==
The New Music Awards are honors given annually in music to both recording artists and radio stations by New Music Weekly magazine.

Year	Nominee / work	Award	Result
2020	Themselves	Top 40 Group of the Year	Won
2020	Themselves	AC/Hot AC Group of the Year	Won
2022	Themselves	AC Group of the Year	Won

== Nickelodeon Choice Awards ==
=== Nickelodeon Australian Kids' Choice Awards ===
The Nickelodeon Australian Kids' Choice Awards honor entertainers with a blimp trophy, as voted by children.

Year	Nominee / work	Award	Result	Ref.
2008	Themselves	Fave Band	Nominated	
2009	Themselves	Favorite International Band	Nominated	
2009	"Paranoid"	Song of the Year	Nominated	

=== Nickelodeon Italian Kids' Choice Awards ===
The Nickelodeon Italy Kids' Choice Awards is an annual awards show that awards entertainers with a blimp trophy.

Year	Nominee / work	Award	Result	Ref.
2008	Themselves	Best Band	Won	
2008	"S.O.S"	Most Addictive Track	Won	

=== Nickelodeon Mexican Kids' Choice Awards ===
The Nickelodeon Mexico Kids' Choice Awards is an annual awards show that awards entertainers with a blimp trophy.

Year	Nominee / work	Award	Result	Ref.
2010	Jonas L.A.	Favorite Show	Nominated	
2019	Themselves	Favorite International Artist or Group	Nominated	
2019	"Sucker"	Favorite Hit	Nominated	
2020	"What a Man Gotta Do"	Global Hit of the Year	Nominated	
2023	Themselves	Favorite Global Artist	Nominated	
2023	"Waffle House"	Global Hit of the Year	Nominated	

=== Nickelodeon Kids' Choice Awards ===
The Nickelodeon Kids' Choice Awards is an annual awards show established in 1988 by Nickelodeon. The Jonas Brothers have received 16 nominations and have won 2 awards.

Year	Nominee / work	Award	Result
2008	Themselves	Favorite Music Group	Won
2009	Themselves	Favorite Music Group	Won
2010	Joe Jonas	Favorite TV Actor	Nominated
2010	Nick Jonas	Favorite TV Actor	Nominated
2010	Themselves	Favorite Music Group	Nominated
2011	Joe Jonas	Favorite TV Actor	Nominated
2011	Nick Jonas	Favorite TV Actor	Nominated
2011	Themselves	Favorite Music Group	Nominated
2020	Themselves	Favorite Music Group	Nominated
2020	Sucker	Favorite Song	Nominated
2021	Themselves	Favorite Music Group	Nominated
2022	Themselves	Favorite Music Group	Nominated
2022	Leave Before You Love Me by Marshmello x Jonas Brothers	Favorite Music Collaboration	Nominated
2024	Themselves	Favorite Music Group	Nominated
2025	Slow Motion by Marshmello x Jonas Brothers	Favorite Music Collaboration	Nominated
2025	Themselves	Favorite Music Group	Nominated

== NME Awards ==
The NME Awards is an annual music awards show, founded by the music magazine, NME (New Musical Express). The first awards show was held in 1953, shortly after the founding of the magazine. The Jonas Brothers have received five awards over three years, receiving the "Worst Band" award for three years in a row.

Year	Nominee / work	Award	Result
2009	A Little Bit Longer	Worst Album	Won
2009	Themselves	Worst Band	Won
2010	Lines, Vines and Trying Times	Worst Album	Won
2010	Themselves	Worst Band	Won
2011	Themselves	Worst Band	Won

== NRJ Music Awards ==
An NRJ Music Award (commonly abbreviated as an NMA) is an award presented by the French radio station NRJ to honor the best in the French and worldwide music industry. The Jonas Brothers have received 4 nominations and have won 2 awards.

Year	Nominee / work	Award	Result
2009	Themselves	International Breakthrough of the Year	Won
2019	Themselves	International Duo/Group of the Year	Nominated
2019	Video of the Year	"Sucker"	Nominated
2019	Themselves	Award of Merit	Won

== Planeta Awards ==
The Planeta awards are hosted in Lima (Peru) from the radio TV station 107.7 fm. The Jonas Brothers have received 5 nominations and have won all 5 awards.

Year	Nominee / work	Award	Result
2008	Themselves	Best new artist international	Won
2008	Song of the year	"Lovebug"	Won
2009	Balada del año	"Paranoid"	Won
2009	Themselves	Best Fan club	Won
2010	Themselves	Best Artist (Banda del año)	Won

== People's Choice Awards ==
The People's Choice Awards are awards show recognizing the best in entertainment & pop culture, voted online by the general public and fans.

Year	Nominee / work	Award	Result
2011	Camp Rock 2: The Final Jam	Favorite Family TV Movie	Won
2019	Happiness Begins	Favorite Album	Nominated
2019	Sucker	Favorite Song	Nominated
2019	Themselves	Favorite Group	Nominated
2020	Themselves	Favorite Group	Nominated
2021	Themselves	Favorite Group	Nominated
2024	Themselves	Favorite Group	Nominated

== Pollstar Awards ==
The Pollstar Awards are awarded by the trade publication Pollstar to artists, management, talent buyers, venues, and support services for professionalism and achievements in the concert tour industry.

Year	Nominee / work	Award	Result
2009	Themselves	Best New Touring Artist	Won
2020	Happiness Begins Tour	Pop Tour of the Year	Nominated
2022	Remember This Tour	Pop Tour of the Year	Nominated
2023	Five Albums. One Night. The World Tour	Pop Tour of the Year	Nominated

== Premios Juventud ==
The Premios Juventud is an awards show for Spanish-speaking celebrities in the areas of film, music, sports, fashion and pop culture, presented by Univision. The Jonas Brothers have received one nomination.

Year	Nominee / work	Award	Result
2021	“X” featuring Karol G	Colaboración OMG	Nominated

== Premio Lo Nuestro ==
The Premio Lo Nuestro or Lo Nuestro Awards are Spanish-language awards show honoring the best Latin music of the year. The Jonas Brothers have received one nomination.

Year	Nominee / work	Award	Result
2020	“Runaway”	Colaboración del Año	Nominated

== Premios Oye! ==
Los Premios Oye! are presented annually by the "National Academy of Music in Mexico" to reward the best artists of the music industry. Los Premios Oye! are equivalent to the Grammy Awards in the United States. The Jonas Brothers received one nomination which they have won.

Year	Nominee / work	Award	Result
2008	Themselves	Main English artists of the year	Won

== Radio Disney Music Awards ==
The Radio Disney Music Awards (RDMA) were an annual awards show operated and governed by Radio Disney.

Year	Nominee / work	Award	Result
2006	Themselves	Best Group	Nominated
2006	Themselves	Best Group Made of Brothers/Sisters	Nominated
2006	"Year 3000"	Best Video That Rocks	Nominated
2007	Themselves	Best Group	Won
2007	"S.O.S"	Best Team Anthem	Nominated
2007	Themselves	Best New Artist	Nominated

== Shorty Awards ==
The Shorty Awards, also known as the "Shortys", is an annual awards show recognizing the people and organizations that produce real-time short-form content across Twitter, Facebook, YouTube, Instagram, TikTok, Twitch and the rest of the social web.

Year	Nominee / work	Award	Result	Ref.
2011	Themselves	Best in Music	Won	
2012	Themselves	Best Band	Won	
2013	Themselves	Best Band	Nominated	
2021	Lenovo Yoga & Intel Evo Presents: Jonas Brothers For All Creators	Immersive	Nominated	
2021	Lenovo Yoga & Intel Evo Presents: Jonas Brothers For All Creators	Multi-Platform Campaign	Nominated	
2021	Lenovo Yoga & Intel Evo Presents: Jonas Brothers For All Creators	User-Generated Content	Nominated	

== Spotify Plaques ==
The Spotify Plaques are awarded to artists to recognize songs that exceed 1 billion streams on the platform.

Year	Nominee / work	Award	Result
2021	"Sucker"	1,000,000,000 streams	Won
2025	"Leave Before You Love Me"	1,000,000,000 streams	Won

== Streamy Awards ==
The Streamy Awards recognize excellence in online video, including directing, acting, producing, and writing.

Year	Nominee / work	Award	Result
2023	Themselves	Crossover	Won

== Teen Choice Awards ==
The Teen Choice Awards is an annual awards show established in 1999 by the Fox Broadcasting Company. The Jonas Brothers have received 26 nominations, winning 17.

Year	Nominee / work	Award	Result
2008	Themselves	Choice Music Breakout Group	Won
2008	Themselves	Choice Male Red Carpet Icon[s]	Won
2008	Themselves	Choice Male Hottie[s]	Won
2008	"When You Look Me in the Eyes"	Choice Music Single	Won
2008	"When You Look Me in the Eyes"	Choice Music Love Song	Won
2008	"Burnin' Up"	Choice Summer Song	Won
2008	Themselves	Most Fanatic Fans	Won
2009	Themselves	Choice TV Actor Comedy	Won
2009	Jonas	Choice Breakout Show	Won
2009	"Lovebug"	Choice Music Love Song	Nominated
2009	Lines, Vines and Trying Times	Choice Music Album Group	Won
2009	Music from the 3D Concert Experience	Choice Music Soundtrack	Nominated
2009	Themselves	Choice Music Tour	Nominated
2009	Themselves	Choice Male Hottie	Nominated
2009	Themselves	Choice Red Carpet Fashion Icon Male	Won
2009	"Before The Storm"	Choice Summer Song	Won
2009	Frankie Jonas	Choice TV Breakout Male	Won
2009	Jonas Brothers: The 3D Concert Experience	Choice Movie Music/Dance	Nominated
2010	Themselves	Choice TV Actor Comedy	Won
2010	Themselves	Red Carpet Fashion Icon Male	Won
2019	Themselves	Choice Music Group	Nominated
2019	"Sucker"	Choice Song: Group	Nominated
2019	"Sucker"	Choice Pop Song	Nominated
2019	"Cool"	Choice Summer Song	Nominated
2019	Themselves	Choice Summer Group	Won
2019	Themselves	Decade Award	Won

== Telehit Awards ==
Year	Nominee / work	Award	Result
2010	Themselves	International Youth Artist	Won
2019	"Sucker"	Best Anglo Video	Nominated
2019	"Sucker"	Best Anglo Song	Nominated
2019	"Sucker"	People's Best Video	Won

== The Fact Music Awards ==
Year	Nominee / work	Award	Result
2023	"Do It Like That"	Best Music (Fall)	Nominated

== The Soup Awards ==
The Soup is a TV show hosted by comedian Joel McHale. Joe Jonas has received one nomination and won.

Year	Nominee / work	Award	Result
2010	Joe Jonas	Best Third Jonas	Won

== TMF Awards ==
The TMF Awards is an annual television awards show established in 1995 by The Music Factory. The Jonas Brothers have received eight nominations, winning four.

Year	Nominee / work	Award	Result
2008	Themselves	Best New Artist	Won
2008	Themselves	Best Pop	Won
2008	Jonas Brothers	Best New Album	Nominated
2008	Jonas Brothers	Best International Album	Won
2008	"S.O.S"	Best Video	Nominated
2009	Paranoid	Best Video	Won
2009	Lines, Vines and Trying Times	Best International Album	Nominated
2009	Themselves	Best Pop	Nominated

== Festival de Viña del mar-Chile ==
The Viña del mar's Festival, is a well-known festival in Chile, in which, the people (called monster) calls the awards and give it to the artists.[15]

Year	Nominee / work	Award	Result
2013	Themselves	Antorcha de plata	Won
2013	Themselves	Antorcha de oro	Won
2013	Themselves	Gaviota de plata	Won
2013	Themselves	Gaviota de oro	Won

== World Music Awards ==
The World Music Awards is an international award show founded in 1989. Awards are presented to the world's best-selling artists in a number of categories and to the best-selling artists from each major territory.

Year	Nominee / work	Award	Result
2014	Themselves	World's Best Live Act	Nominated
2014	Themselves	World's Best Group	Nominated

== Other accolades ==
=== World records ===
Name of publication, year the record was awarded, name of the record, and the name of the record holder
Publication	Year	World record	Record holder	R. Status	Ref.
Guinness World Records	2008	Most Entries directly into the U.S. Top 20 by a group in a year	Themselves	Record	

=== Honors ===
Year	Nominee / work	Award	Result	Ref.
2019	Themselves	Teen Choice Awards Decade Award	Honored	
2019	Themselves	NRJ Music Awards Award of Honour	Honored	
2023	Themselves	Hollywood Walk of Fame	Honored	
2023	Themselves	SoundExchange Hall of Fame	Honored	
2025	Themselves	New Jersey Hall of Fame	Honored	
2025	Themselves	TCL Theater Hand & Foot Imprints	Honored	

=== Philanthropy ===
Year	Nominee / work	Award	Result	Ref.
2010	Themselves	Make-A-Wish Foundation Chris Greicius Celebrity Award	Honored	
2010	Themselves	TJ Martell Foundation Honor	Honored	
2010	Themselves	Vh1 "Do Something!" Best Music Artist	Honored	
2012	Themselves	Variety Power of Youth Philanthropy Award	Honored	

=== Listicles ===
Name of publisher, name of listicle, year(s) listed, and placement result
Publisher	Listicle	Year(s)	Result	Ref.
American Society of Composers, Authors and Publishers (ASCAP)	Best New Classic Holiday Songs	2021, 2022, 2024, 2025	3rd ("Like It's Christmas")	
Billboard	100 Best Deep Cuts by 21st Century Pop Stars	2017	Listed ("Pushin' Me Away")	
Billboard	100 Greatest Boy Band Songs of All Time	2018	63rd ("S.O.S")	
Billboard	100 Greatest Boy Band Songs of All Time	2018	32nd ("Burnin' Up")	
Billboard	100 Greatest Albums of the 2010s	2019	86th ("Happiness Begins")	
Billboard	The Greatest Pop Star By Year (1981-2020)	2019	Placed	
Billboard	The 100 Greatest Music Videos of the 2010s	2019	84th ("Sucker")	
Billboard	30 Best Boy Band Albums of the Past 30 Years	2020	4th ("A Little Bit Longer")	
Billboard	Greatest of All Time Holiday 100 Songs	2022	70th ("Like It's Christmas")	
Billboard	The 100 Greatest Disneyverse Songs of All Time	2023	80th ("Send It On")	
Billboard	The 500 Best Pop Songs of All Time	2023	Listed ("Burnin' Up")	
Entertainment Weekly	Entertainers of the Year	2008	Placed	
Entertainment Weekly	25 Best Disney Channel Original Series of All Time	2022	Placed	
Forbes	Celebrity 100	2008, 2009, 2010, 2012, 2020	Placed	
Forbes	The Breakout Stars of 2008	2008	Placed	
Forbes	World's Most Powerful Celebrities	2008, 2009, 2010, 2020	Placed	
Forbes	Hollywood's Top Earning Moguls	2009	Placed	
Forbes	Top-Earning Boy Bands Of The Century	2016	Listed	
Google	World's Top 10 Most-Searched-For List	2008	Listed	
Google	Top Trending Musicians in the US	2025	6th	
The Hollywood Reporter	10 Best Songs of 2023	2023	3rd ("Vacation Eyes"	
Paper	The Break the Internet Awards	2019	1st (Comeback of the Year)	
People	100 Reasons to Love America	2019, 2022	Placed	
People	Sexiest Man Alive	2019	Placed	
People	Best of the Year	2025	Placed	
Rolling Stone	100 Best Songs of 2008	2008	49th ("Video Girl")	
Rolling Stone	Top 50 Albums of 2008	2008	40th ("A Little Bit Longer")	
Rolling Stone	Best Boy Bands of All Time: Reader’s Poll	2012	Listed	
Rolling Stone	50 Best Songs of 2019	2019	41st ("Sucker")	
Rolling Stone	75 Greatest Boy Band Songs of All Time	2020	59th ("Burnin' Up")	
Rolling Stone	75 Greatest Boy Band Songs of All Time	2020	25th ("Sucker")	
Rolling Stone	75 Greatest Boy Band Songs of All Time	2020	12th ("S.O.S")	
Variety	Youth Impact (under "Music")	2012	Placed	
VH1	'100 Greatest Kid Stars' Of All Time	2014	Listed	
