= Music from the 3D Concert Experience =

2009 live album by Jonas Brothers

Live album / soundtrack by Jonas Brothers
- Released: February 24, 2009
- Recorded: July 13–14, 2008
- Venue: Honda Center (Anaheim, CA)
- Length: 51:22
- Label: Hollywood Records
- Producer: Bruce Hendricks; Art Repola; Johnny Wright; Philip McIntyre; Kevin Jonas Sr.; Alan Sacks

Jonas Brothers chronology
A Little Bit Longer (2008)	Music from the 3D Concert Experience (2009)	Lines, Vines and Trying Times (2009)

Music from the 3D Concert Experience is the first live album and second soundtrack album by the American pop rock band Jonas Brothers. It was released on February 24, 2009, through Hollywood Records, three days before the accompanying concert film's release.

The soundtrack was expected to debut at the top of the charts but debuted at number three on the Billboard 200. As of February 2015, it has sold 189,000 copies in the United States.

== Critical reception ==
Professional ratings
Review scores
Source	Rating
AllMusic	3/5 stars

AllMusic's Stephen Thomas Erlewine gave the album a 3 out of 5 stars review. He highlighted the feature songs and the cover of Shania Twain's "I'm Gonna Getcha Good" as the moments the band stands out the most, while regarding the rest of the album's production as being too similar to the studio recordings. Erlewine concluded that the album is "enough to please the fans", but "not quite enough to turn into something more than a souvenir for them".

== Commercial performance ==
The album debut at number three and stayed for ten consecutive weeks and another four unconsecutive weeks.

== Track listing ==
Music from the 3D Concert Experience track listing
No.	Title	Writer(s)	Length
1.	"That's Just The Way We Roll"	Nicholas Jonas; Joseph Jonas; Kevin Jonas II; William James "Bleu" McAuley III	04:07
2.	"Hold On"	N. Jonas; J. Jonas; K. Jonas	02:48
3.	"BB Good"	N. Jonas; J. Jonas; K. Jonas; John Taylor	04:16
4.	"Video Girl"	N. Jonas; J. Jonas; K. Jonas	03:03
5.	"This Is Me" (featuring Demi Lovato)	Adam Watts; Andy Dodd	03:23
6.	"Hello Beautiful"	N. Jonas; J. Jonas; K. Jonas	03:14
7.	"Pushin' Me Away"	N. Jonas; J. Jonas; K. Jonas	03:40
8.	"Should've Said No" (featuring Taylor Swift)	Taylor Swift	04:14
9.	"I'm Gonna Getcha Good"	Regina Lange; John Lange	04:01
10.	"S.O.S"	N. Jonas	02:31
11.	"Burnin' Up"	N. Jonas; J. Jonas; K. Jonas	05:43
12.	"Tonight"	N. Jonas; J. Jonas; K. Jonas; Greg Garbowsky	03:31
13.	"Live To Party"	N. Jonas; J. Jonas; K. Jonas	03:09
14.	"Love Is On Its Way"	N. Jonas; J. Jonas; K. Jonas; Kevin Jonas Sr.	03:44
Total length:			51:22

Notes

- All tracks are produced by Art Repola, Johnny Wright, Philip McIntyre, Kevin Jonas Sr. and Alan Sacks.
- "I'm Gonna Getcha Good" is not featured in the film.

== Charts ==
=== Weekly charts ===
Chart (2009)	Peak position
Argentina Albums (EFE)	6
Australian Albums (ARIA)	92
Belgian Albums (Ultratop Flanders)	97
Dutch Albums (Album Top 100)	93
Italian Albums (FIMI)	38
Mexican Albums (Top 100 Mexico)	3
Spanish Albums (PROMUSICAE)	32
US Billboard 200	3
US Soundtrack Albums (Billboard)	1

=== Year-end charts ===
Chart (2009)	Position
US Soundtrack Albums (Billboard)	15

== Certifications ==
Region	Certification	Certified units/sales
Brazil (Pro-Música Brasil)	Gold	30,000^{*}
Ireland (IRMA) Video certification	Gold	2,000^{^}
United Kingdom (BPI) Video certification	Gold	25,000^{*}
^{*} Sales figures based on certification alone.^{^} Shipments figures based on certification alone.
