= When You Look Me in the Eyes Tour =

2008 concert tour by the Jonas Brothers

- Continental tour by Jonas Brothers
- Promotional poster
- Location: North America
- Associated album: Jonas Brothers; It's About Time
- Start date: January 31, 2008
- End date: March 22, 2008
- Legs: 1
- No. of shows: 39

Jonas Brothers concert chronology
- Marvelous Party Tour (2007); When You Look Me in the Eyes Tour (2008); The Burning Up Tour (2008–09)

The When You Look Me in the Eyes Tour (also referred as the Look Me in the Eyes Tour and sometimes stylized as the WYLMITE Tour), is the fourth tour by the Jonas Brothers and their second tour to promote their second album, Jonas Brothers. The opening act for the entire tour was Rooney, with Valora as a supporting opening act, as well as Jen Marks. The Look Me in the Eyes Tour started on January 31, 2008, and ended on March 22, 2008. It lasted for a total of 39 dates. During this time, the Jonas Brothers had also signed a two-year, multimillion-dollar worldwide touring deal with Live Nation.

== Opening Acts ==
- Jen Marks
- Valora
- Rooney

== Set list ==
This set list is from the concert on February 22, 2008, in Rosemont. It may not represent all concerts for the tour.

1. "Year 3000"
2. "Just Friends"
3. "Goodnight and Goodbye"
4. "Australia"
5. "Hello Beautiful"
6. "Take a Breath"
7. "Underdog"
8. "Shelf"
9. "Pushin' Me Away"
10. "That's Just the Way We Roll"
11. "Games"
12. "Take On Me (A-ha cover)
13. "Still in Love With You"
14. "Hollywood"
15. "Burnin' Up" (with drum break)
16. "When You Look Me in the Eyes"
17. "Hold On"

Encore

18. "A Little Bit Longer" / "So Far Away" (Carole King's interlude)
19. "S.O.S."

== Tour dates ==
Date	City	Country	Venue
January 31, 2008	Tucson	United States	Tucson Convention Center
February 1, 2008	Paradise	United States	Planet Hollywood Resort and Casino
February 2, 2008	Los Angeles	United States	Gibson Amphitheatre
February 3, 2008	Los Angeles	United States	Gibson Amphitheatre
February 4, 2008	Los Angeles	United States	Gibson Amphitheatre
February 5, 2008	Everett	United States	Comcast Arena
February 6, 2008	Portland	United States	Arlene Schnitzer Concert Hall
February 8, 2008	West Valley City	United States	E Center
February 9, 2008	Denver	United States	Colorado Convention Center
February 11, 2008	El Paso	United States	Chavez Theatre
February 12, 2008	San Antonio	United States	AT&T Center
February 14, 2008	Houston	United States	Toyota Center
February 15, 2008	North Little Rock	United States	Alltel Arena
February 16, 2008	Evansville	United States	Roberts Stadium
February 17, 2008	Peoria	United States	Peoria Civic Center
February 20, 2008	Minneapolis	United States	Target Center
February 21, 2008	Grand Rapids	United States	Van Andel Arena
February 22, 2008	Rosemont	United States	Allstate Arena
February 23, 2008	Detroit	United States	Fox Theatre
February 24, 2008	Louisville	United States	The Louisville Palace
February 25, 2008	St. Louis	United States	Fox Theatre
February 27, 2008	Kansas City	United States	Sprint Center
February 28, 2008	Grand Prairie	United States	Nokia Theatre
March 1, 2008	Hidalgo	United States	Dodge Arena
March 2, 2008	Lafayette	United States	Cajundome
March 4, 2008	Grand Prairie	United States	Nokia Theatre
March 7, 2008	Sunrise	United States	BankAtlantic Center
March 8, 2008	Tampa	United States	St. Pete Times Forum
March 9, 2008	Orlando	United States	Amway Arena
March 11, 2008	Richmond	United States	Richmond Coliseum
March 13, 2008	Reading	United States	Reading Eagle Theatre
March 14, 2008	Fairfax	United States	Patriot Center
March 15, 2008	Manchester	United States	Verizon Wireless Arena
March 16, 2008	Bridgeport	United States	Arena at Harbor Yard
March 18, 2008	Wallingford	United States	Chevrolet Theatre
March 19, 2008	Portland	United States	Cumberland County Civic Center
March 20, 2008	Boston	United States	Agganis Arena
March 21, 2008	Atlantic City	United States	Mark G. Etess Arena
March 22, 2008	East Rutherford	United States	Izod Center
April 18, 2008	Mexico City	Mexico	Vive Cuervo Salón

=== Box office score data ===
Venue	City	Tickets Sold / Available	Gross Revenue
E Center	West Valley City	4,732 / 4,732	$215,978
Colorado Convention Center	Denver	5,075 / 5,075	$232,506
Chavez Theatre	El Paso	2,531 / 2,531	$115,860
Toyota Center	Houston	10,542 / 10,595	$472,050
Alltel Arena	North Little Rock	7,840 / 8,262	$348,708
Roberts Stadium	Evansville	6,270 / 6,270	$255,665
Peoria Civic Center	Peoria	7,265 / 7,265	$298,998
Target Center	Minneapolis	9,103 / 9,396	$373,613
Van Andel Arena	Grand Rapids	7,898 / 8,026	$356,526
Allstate Arena	Rosemont	13,496 / 13,496	$587,573
Fox Theatre	Detroit	9,505 / 9,653	$398,118
The Louisville Palace	Louisville	2,691 / 2,691	$118,980
Fox Theatre	St. Louis	4,163 / 4,163	$179,634
Sprint Center	Kansas City	9,587 / 9,973	$424,770
NOKIA Theatre	Grand Prairie	12,660 / 12,660	$592,205
Dodge Arena	Hidalgo	5,878 / 5,903	$391,650
The Cajundome	Lafayette	8,012 / 8,012	$335,165
BankAtlantic Center	Sunrise	10,517 / 10,566	$431,800
St. Pete Times Forum	Tampa	7,990 / 8,852	$345,947
Amway Arena	Orlando	10,200 / 10,200	$471,629
Richmond Coliseum	Richmond	8,643 / 8,643	$395,443
Sovereign Center	Reading	6,657 / 6,657	$300,830
Patriot Center	Fairfax	7,289 / 7,289	$343,487
Verizon Wireless Arena	Manchester	8,761 / 8,761	$404,790
Arena at Harbor Yard	Bridgeport	8,267 / 8,267	$398,209
Chevrolet Theatre	Wallingford	4,525 / 4,525	$191,521
Cumberland County Civic Center	Portland	6,572 / 6,657	$299,740
Agganis Arena	Boston	6,736 / 6,736	$305,060
Mark Etess Arena	Atlantic City	5,244 / 5,244	$249,660
Izod Center	East Rutherford	15,919 / 15,919	$627,645
Vive Cuervo Salon	Mexico City	3,500 / 3,500	$149,476
TOTAL		238,068 / 240,519	$10,613,236
