= Jonas Brothers: The 3D Concert Experience =

2009 film directed by Bruce Hendricks

- Theatrical release poster
- Directed by: Bruce Hendricks
- Produced by: Kevin Jonas, Sr. Alan Sacks; Johnny Wright; Phil McIntyre
- Starring: Kevin Jonas; Joe Jonas; Nick Jonas; Demi Lovato; Taylor Swift
- Cinematography: Mitchell Amundsen; Reed Smoot
- Edited by: Michael Tronick
- Music by: Jonas Brothers
- Production companies: Walt Disney Pictures; Jonas Films
- Distributed by: Walt Disney Studios; Motion Pictures
- Release date: February 27, 2009
- Running time: 76 minutes 85 minutes (Extended edition)
- Country: United States
- Language: English
- Box office: $30.4 million ($46.3 million adj. for 2025 inflation

Jonas Brothers: The 3D Concert Experience is a 2009 American concert film released in Disney Digital 3-D, RealD 3D and IMAX 3D. It was released in the United States and Canada on February 27, 2009 with the release in other countries later on. The film stars Kevin, Joe, and Nick Jonas, of the American pop band the Jonas Brothers, in their theatrical debut.

The film received generally negative reviews from critics, and grossed $30.4 million worldwide.

== Plot ==
The 3D Concert Experience follows the Jonas Brothers during their Burnin' Up Tour in a behind-the-scenes look at their busy schedule while in New York City, August 9–11, 2008. As part of their concert tour, they also go on a press tour, including interviews and television performances to promote the release of their third studio album, A Little Bit Longer and ending their day in Madison Square Garden. The film intercuts to concert performances off their self-titled second studio album and third studio album, filmed during their tour on July 13–14, 2008 in Anaheim. Performing alongside the Jonas Brothers are guest stars Demi Lovato on "This Is Me", Taylor Swift on "Should've Said No" and the brothers' bodyguard Robert "Big Rob" Feggans on "Burnin' Up". The film also debuted two new studio recordings, "Love Is On Its Way", which was filmed in Central Park, and "Live to Party", which would later serve as the theme song for their Disney Channel TV series.

== Cast ==
Main

- Kevin Jonas - Guitar, backup vocals
- Joe Jonas - Vocals, guitar
- Nick Jonas - Guitar, vocals, drums, piano
- Demi Lovato - Vocals
- Taylor Swift - Vocals, guitar
- Robert "Big Rob" Feggans - Vocals

Band members

- John Taylor - Musical director/guitar
- Jack Lawless - Drums
- Ryan Liestman - Keyboards
- Greg Garbowsky - Bass

Additional

- Kevin Jonas, Sr.
- Denise Jonas
- Frankie Jonas

== Set list ==
1. "Lovebug" (instrumental) [intro]
2. "Tonight" (studio recorded vocals/live band in background) [opening credits]
3. "That's Just the Way We Roll"
4. "Hold On"
5. "BB Good"
6. "Goodnight and Goodbye"
7. "Video Girl"
8. "Gotta Find You"
9. "This Is Me" (with Demi Lovato)
10. "A Little Bit Longer"
11. "Play My Music" (studio recording)
12. "Hello Beautiful"
13. "Still in Love with You"
14. "Pushin' Me Away"
15. "Can't Have You"
16. "Should've Said No" (with Taylor Swift)
17. "Love Is On Its Way"
18. "S.O.S."
19. "Live to Party" (studio recording)
20. "Burnin' Up" (with Robert "Big Rob" Feggans)
21. "Tonight" (studio recording) [end credits]
22. "Shelf" (live performance) [end credits]

== Soundtrack ==
The film's soundtrack was released on February 24, 2009, three days before the film's release. It debuted at number #3 on the Billboard 200 and was certified gold by Pro-Música Brasil and the British Phonographic Industry (BPI).

== Reception and box office ==
The film received generally negative reviews from critics; on Rotten Tomatoes it holds a 23% rating based on 75 critics' reviews. The site's consensus reads, "Jonas Brothers: The 3-D Concert Experience should please the brothers' adoring followers, but for non-converts, this concert film is largely flat and unenlightening." On Metacritic, the film has a score of 45 out of 100 based on 14 reviews. In general, critics panned the film for lacking appeal to any people outside the group's fan base. According to Box Office Mojo in 2009, it was the sixth highest-grossing concert film, following Justin Bieber: Never Say Never, Michael Jackson's This Is It, Hannah Montana and Miley Cyrus: Best of Both Worlds Concert (in which the Jonas Brothers had a guest star role), One Direction: This Is Us and Katy Perry: Part of Me.

The film was nominated for a Teen Choice Award in 2009 for "Choice Movie: Music/Dance" and "Choice Music Album: Soundtrack". The film also received two nominations at the 30th Golden Raspberry Awards: Worst Actor for the Jonas Brothers (which they won) and Worst Screen Couple for "Any two (or more) Jonas Brothers".

== Home media ==
The film was released on DVD and Blu-ray on June 30, 2009. In the US, the Blu-ray edition of the film includes the anaglyph 3D version, with both one and two-disc DVD editions including only the 2D version of the film. However, for the UK and Australia DVD releases, Disney chose to release the film with the 3D version on DVD, as there was no Blu-ray release in either country.

DVD Extended Edition

- Anaglyph 3D version of the film
- Two performances not included in the theatrical release: "Can't Have You" and "A Little Bit Longer"
- Extra songs included in the bonus features: "Shelf" and "Lovebug"
- Up Close and Personal: Behind the Scenes with the Jonas Brothers

The film was included as part of the release catalog for the launch of the Disney+ streaming platform in November 2019, along with Hannah Montana and Miley Cyrus: Best of Both Worlds Concert, however, both films were not released in 3D. The film was renamed Jonas Brothers: The Concert Experience, much like the US DVD release of the concert film.

== See also ==
- The Burning Up Tour
