= BB Good =

BB Good may refer to:

- B. B. Good, American disc jockey
- "BB Good" (song)
