= Magnus Ferrell =

American singer-songwriter (born 2004)

- Born: Magnus Paulin Ferrell; March 7, 2004 (age 22); Los Angeles, California, U.S.
- Genres: Pop; R&B; soul
- Occupations: Singer-songwriter; musician
- Instruments: Vocals; piano
- Labels: Visva; Republic
- Website: www.magnusferrell.com

Magnus Paulin Ferrell (/ˈfɛrəl/; born March 7, 2004) is an American singer-songwriter and musician. After releasing music independently while studying at the University of Southern California, he signed with Visva Records and Republic Records. His 2026 single "Asleep Talking" became his first entry on a Billboard chart, debuting at number 24 on the Digital Song Sales chart. Later that year, he was nominated for Best New Artist at the 2026 MTV Video Music Awards.

Ferrell is the eldest son of actor and comedian Will Ferrell and Viveca Paulin.

== Early life and education ==
Ferrell was born on March 7, 2004, in Los Angeles, California, to Will Ferrell and Viveca Paulin. He began studying piano as a child and became interested in jazz as a teenager, playing in school jazz ensembles. His paternal grandfather, Roy Lee Ferrell Jr., was a musician who played saxophone and keyboards with the Righteous Brothers. Ferrell speaks Swedish, having learned it through his mother, and grew up spending summers in Gnesta.

Ferrell attended the University of Southern California, where he studied acting. During his time at USC, he increasingly pursued music and later left school to focus on his recording career.

== Career ==
=== 2023–2025: Early releases and record deal ===
In March 2023, Ferrell performed at the Troubadour in West Hollywood as part of a concert organized by USC students. Annenberg Media reported that he had also performed at the Mayan Theater and Hotel Ziggy in Los Angeles and had opened for the Psychedelic Furs at the Music Box in San Diego.

Ferrell released the six-track EP Hasn't Even Started in 2024. The project included the singles "Life or Death", "Missed Your Chance" and "Don't Talk to Me Like That".

He subsequently signed with Visva Records and Republic Records. In 2025, his song "Slow Down", recorded with Deacon Phillippe, was featured in the film You're Cordially Invited. He also released singles including "Miss Me Vendetta", "Ain't the Feeling" and "New Sensation".

=== 2026: "Asleep Talking" and wider recognition ===
Ferrell released "Asleep Talking" on April 24, 2026 through Visva and Republic Records. The song received increased attention after Will Ferrell played an excerpt during an appearance on Michelle Obama and Craig Robinson's IMO podcast. It subsequently became Magnus Ferrell's first Billboard chart entry, debuting at number 24 on the Digital Song Sales chart.

Ferrell made his first festival appearance at Outside Lands in San Francisco in August 2026. V described him that month as a multi-instrumentalist whose growing audience followed the success of "Asleep Talking", his Republic Records deal and a developing festival schedule.

In August, Ferrell was announced as a nominee for Best New Artist at the 2026 MTV Video Music Awards. He was also announced as a supporting act on select dates of the Jonas Brothers' 2026 The Burning Up Tour All Over Again.

== Musical style ==
Ferrell's music has been described as incorporating pop, R&B, soul, funk and jazz influences. He has cited his early study of jazz piano as influential to his songwriting and musicianship. Ferrell has frequently collaborated with songwriter and producer Gabe Yaron.

== Discography ==
=== Extended plays ===
- Hasn't Even Started (2024)
- Groove Therapy (2026)

=== Selected singles ===
- "Life or Death" (2024)
- "Miss Me Vendetta" (2025)
- "Ain't the Feeling" (2025)
- "New Sensation" (2025)
- "Asleep Talking" (2026)
- "Waste Your Heart" (2026)

== Awards and nominations ==
| Year | Organization | Category | Result | Ref. |
|---|---|---|---|---|
| 2026 | MTV Video Music Awards | Best New Artist | Nominated | |
