= Listen When Sad =

2026 single by Jonas Brothers

Single by Jonas Brothers
- Released: August 28, 2026
- Genre: Pop-punk
- Length: 3:48
- Label: Jonas Brothers Recordings, LLC
- Songwriters: Joseph Jonas; Nicholas Jonas; Kevin Jonas II; John Fields; Jack Lawless; JP Saxe; Tommy English; Paris Carney
- Producer: John Fields

Jonas Brothers singles chronology
"Cliché" (Jonas Brothers remix) (2025)	"Listen When Sad" (2026)

Lyric video
- "Listen When Sad" on YouTube

"Listen When Sad" is a song by American pop rock group Jonas Brothers. It was released on August 28, 2026, through Jonas Brothers Recordings, LLC. The three group members, Joe, Nick, and Kevin Jonas, wrote the song with producer John Fields, alongside tour drummer Jack Lawless, JP Saxe, Tommy English, and Paris Carney.

== Background and lyrics ==
The song was announced at the band's pop-up for Complex in New York City on August 20, 2026. The Jonas Brothers debuted the song live on the same day at their show at Madison Square Garden, which began the band's The Burning Up Tour All Over Again. Nick Jonas from the group explained that he and his brothers had regained interest on "a sound that was kind of the sound of the early 2000s" for the song, citing American rock bands Switchfoot, Taking Back Sunday, Dashboard Confessional as influences. He stated that they reunited with John Fields, a frequent producer collaborator of the band whom they worked with on previous records.

The group said in a statement that there was "something special" about the song, which marks a return to "one of the most pivotal eras in our musical journey" with "the emo and alternative influences we grew up on" and felt "like a piece of our heritage channeled through who we are today" to the band. A pop-punk song, it features the band returning to their older sound they had in the 2000s.

== Charts ==
Chart performance for "Listen When Sad"
Chart (2026)	Peak position
Canada Hot AC (Billboard)	29
New Zealand Hot Singles (RMNZ)	38
US Pop Airplay (Billboard)	37
