= A Little Bit Longer (song) =

2008 single by Jonas Brothers

Promotional single by Jonas Brothers

from the album A Little Bit Longer
- Released: August 5, 2008
- Recorded: 2007
- Genre: Pop rock
- Length: 3:25 (Album version); 5:47 (Live at SoHo version)
- Label: Hollywood
- Songwriter: Nick Jonas
- Producer: John Fields

"A Little Bit Longer" is a song by the Jonas Brothers, written and sung by Nick Jonas. The song was released as the first promotional single from their third studio album of the same name.

== Background and composition ==
"A Little Bit Longer"
A 20 second sample of "A Little Bit Longer" by Jonas Brothers, where a portion of the chorus is heard.

The title of the album, "A Little Bit Longer", comes from their song of the same name, which Nick Jonas wrote about his feelings with having type 1 diabetes. Nick explained his motivations for writing the "life song" about his battle with type 1 diabetes at a press conference Wednesday morning (August 6). "I had a day when my sugar was out of range, and I sat down at the piano and wrote it in 20 minutes," he said. "And it was because I had this strong inspiration. A lot of people have told me it's inspiring." In their book Burning Up, Nick said that he wrote a song about diabetes called "A Little Bit Longer": "I was in Canada shooting Camp Rock, and I was having one of those days where my blood sugar was a little bit out of control. I walked into a banquet room at the hotel where we were staying and saw a baby grand piano. Nobody was in there, so I sat down and began to play. Fifteen minutes later I called everybody into the room to come listen to the song. They all loved it. It was a really great feeling, because I had been feeling so down."

== Other uses ==
A live version of the song was used in 2008 as a B-side of their single "Burnin' Up". The song was included on their 2009 EP iTunes Live from SoHo. The live version of the song played at SoHo was also featured on the "Fly with Me" EP. On May 11, 2010, the song formed part of a medley with the song "Black Keys" on the live album Nick Jonas & The Administration Live at the Wiltern January 28th, 2010.

The song was also a part of the Jonas Brothers: The 3D Concert Experience movie set list.

== Critical reception ==
Professional ratings
Review scores
Source	Rating
Entertainment Weekly	B+

Chris Willman of Entertainment Weekly gave the album a grade of B+ and wrote: "The album really has only one true, through-and-through ballad — the closing title song, a tune Nick wrote about being hospitalized for diabetes, which comes off as surprisingly matter-of-fact and unsentimental. Several more upbeat numbers bear comely choruses that suggest they might have been conceived as ballads, but rather than simply indulge worshipful lasses who'd probably gladly sway their arms to goop, the boys can't help but keep credibly rocking out. For that, Jonas Brothers, the parents of the world salute you...and, possibly, secretly burn copies of their daughters' CDs to play on their way to work."

== Live performances ==
Nick Jonas performed "A Little Bit Longer" for the first time during the Jonas Brothers' When You Look Me in the Eyes Tour. The performance of the song consisted of Nick Jonas singing the song behind the piano. During the song Nick would often do a short speech about the song, and would finish it with a backing band. It became a feature of every subsequent tour. During the Jonas Brothers World Tour 2009 he performed the song in a medley with the song "Black Keys". In 2010 during his time as Nick Jonas & the Administration he performed the song in a medley with "Black Keys" as part of their Who I Am Tour. In 2011 he performed the song with the Administration; first in a medley with the Coldplay song "Yellow" during their performance at the Cisco Bluesfest in Ottawa, Ontario, Canada on July 16. On August 13 of the same year he performed during Musikfest an acoustic version of "A Little Bit Longer" again in a medley with Coldplay's "Yellow" and "It Takes Two" from the musical Hairspray. He once again performed the song as a medley with "Yellow" during the Nick Jonas 2011 Tour, and regularly sang it during the Jonas Brothers' 2012/2013 World Tour. On some dates he performed the song on a guitar. On November 28, 2012, the song was again performed in a medley with "Yellow". The following day, Nick performed the song acoustically in a medley with "Yellow" and the Rihanna song "Diamonds". On March 3, 2013, the song was performed in Argentina alongside "Diamonds" again.

On July 13, the song was performed as part of the set list of the Jonas Brothers Live Tour. On July 23, July 25, and July 31, "A Little Bit Longer" and "Black Keys" were both performed in a medley. On August 3 it was performed in a medley with "Dear God".

== Versions ==
- "A Little Bit Longer" (album version) – 3:25

Other versions

- "A Little Bit Longer" (iTunes Live from SoHo) – 5:47
- "A Little Bit Longer" (live version) – 8:38
- "Black Keys / A Little Bit Longer" (live) – 7:16

== Personnel ==
Credits for A Little Bit Longer:

- Nick Jonas – lead vocals, piano
- John Fields – producer

== Charts ==
Chart (2008–2009)	Peak position
Canada Hot 100 (Billboard)	10
US Billboard Hot 100	11
US Pop 100 (Billboard)	20
