= Alan Sacks =

American executive producer (1943–2024)

- Born: 1943; United States
- Died: October 22, 2024 (aged 80–81); New York, U.S.
- Occupation(s): Producer, screenwriter

Alan Sacks (1943 – October 22, 2024) was an American executive producer, most well known as producer and co-creator of the television series Welcome Back, Kotter. He managed the band Unlocking the Truth.

== Disney ==
Alan Sacks produced a string of films for the Disney Channel, starting with Smart House in 1999. He followed it up with the Emmy Award-winning The Color of Friendship in 2000. He was executive producer of Camp Rock and Camp Rock 2: The Final Jam, starring Demi Lovato and the Jonas Brothers. He also produced the supervised television series Jonas. Among his other Disney Channel projects, they include The Other Me, Pixel Perfect, and You Wish!. In 2009, he produced the film Jonas Brothers: The 3D Concert Experience.

== Television ==
Sacks helped develop and co-create Welcome Back, Kotter with Gabe Kaplan in 1975, based on Kaplan's stand-up routine about his high school buddies in Brooklyn. He also worked on Chico and The Man, a show created by Welcome Back, Kotter executive producer James Komack. In 1991, he created and produced a short-lived Saturday morning children's show built around the comedy and western band Riders In The Sky.

He produced a number of made-for-television movies in the 70's and 80's, including Women at West Point in 1979; Twirl in 1981; Rosie: The Rosemary Clooney Story in 1982; and A Cry for Love among others.

== Film projects ==
In 1984, after a project involving the band The Runaways imploded, he took the footage and incorporated it into a plot about a director working under the gun to finish a movie starring Joan Jett. The resulting film, Du-Beat-e-o, set against the backdrop of the then-burgeoning L.A. Hardcore Punk scene, starred Ray Sharkey and Derf Scratch of the band Fear.

In 1986, he wrote and produced the skateboarding film Thrashin' starring Josh Brolin, Robert Rusler, and Pamela Gidley. The film is notable for featuring a music performance by the original incarnation of the band Red Hot Chili Peppers.

Sacks also produced several documentaries, including Elko: The Cowboy Gathering, in 1994, and the video His Holiness the Dalai Lama: Compassion as a Source Of Happiness in 2007.

== Theater ==
Sacks wrote, directed, and co-produced the Off-Broadway production Lenny Bruce (In His Own Words).

== Music ==
Sacks was a manager of the metal group Unlocking the Truth. He helped the group secure a six-album record deal with Sony Music worth upwards of $1.7 million.

== Personal life and death ==
Sacks later resided in Los Angeles with his wife and youngest daughter. Along with producing, he was also a professor emeritus at Los Angeles Valley College. He taught classes on film, television, and broadcasting until his retirement from teaching in 2007.

Sacks died from lymphoma in New York on October 22, 2024, at the age of 81.
