= John Lloyd Taylor =

American guitarist

John Taylor
- Born: John Lloyd Taylor; March 23, 1982 (age 44)
- Origin: United States
- Genres: Teen pop, pop rock
- Occupations: Guitarist, director

John Lloyd "J.T." Taylor (born March 23, 1982) is an American musician and director. Not to be confused with the bassist of Duran Duran who shares the same name, he is best known as the lead guitarist and musical director for the pop rock band the Jonas Brothers, from 2005 to 2013. He is also in the band formerly known as Bulldozer, now known as Ocean Grove, consisting of himself and the rest of the Jonas Brothers' band: Greg Garbowsky, Ryan Liestman (formerly), and Jack Lawless.

== Career ==
=== Music ===
John Taylor helps the Jonas Brothers' music production by playing lead guitar for the band. John's name is used in the Jonas Brothers' hit song "Lovebug". "No way, John Taylor!" can be heard clearly in the background at 1:05. Also in the song Burnin' Up.

=== Performances ===
John Taylor has played guitar alongside the Jonas Brothers as they performed with Stevie Wonder, Brad Paisley, Steven Curtis Chapman, Michael W. Smith, Amy Grant, Vince Gill, Dan Aykroyd, Demi Lovato, Jordin Sparks, Jesse McCartney, Taylor Swift, and Miley Cyrus.

=== Television & film ===
Like bandmates Greg Garbowsky, Ryan Liestman and Jack Lawless, John Taylor has performed alongside the Jonas Brothers. He has performed on many television and awards shows, such as the Grammy Awards, Saturday Night Live, Dick Clark's New Year's Rockin' Eve, American Music Awards, Dancing With the Stars, MTV Video Music Awards, The Much Music Video Awards, The Good Morning America Summer Concert Series, the Today Show Summer Concert Series, and FN MTV. He also made several appearances on The Ellen DeGeneres Show and many other talk shows like The Tonight Show with Jay Leno, Jimmy Kimmel Live!, Live with Regis and Kelly, and The Oprah Winfrey Show. He also played at the Disney Channel Kids Inaugural He has appeared in several episodes of Jonas Brothers: Living the Dream with the Jonas Brothers.

He performed in the Hannah Montana & Miley Cyrus: Best of Both Worlds Concert and Jonas Brothers: The 3D Concert Experience.

He also featured in episode 5, "Band's Best Friend", of the Jonas Brothers TV series, JONAS as Joe's history teacher.

He appears in Demi Lovato's 2017 YouTube documentary Demi Lovato: Simply Complicated as well as the 2019 Amazon Prime Video documentary Jonas Brothers: Chasing Happiness, which he directed.

== Personal life ==
John Taylor graduated from State College Area High School in State College, Pennsylvania before attending Berklee College of Music and Pennsylvania State University.
