= Greg Garbowsky =

American bassist

- Also known as: Garbo
- Born: Gregory Robert Garbowsky; September 10, 1986 (age 40); South Plainfield, New Jersey, U.S.
- Genres: Pop rock, pop
- Occupation: Bassist
- Years active: 2003–present

Gregory Robert Garbowsky (born September 10, 1986) also known as Garbo, is an American musician best known as the bass guitarist for the pop rock bands Ocean Grove and Jonas Brothers.

== Early life and education ==
Garbowsky was born and raised in South Plainfield, New Jersey, the son of Lois and Robert Garbowsky. He has one sibling, Juliann. He attended John E. Riley Elementary School and began playing violin in 3rd grade. He played drums in middle school and when he was 13, he asked his parents for a bass guitar for Christmas.

Garbowsky graduated from South Plainfield High School in 2004 and that fall enrolled in Seton Hall University in South Orange. He played bass in a band called Level Zero, which won a Battle of the Bands at Seton Hall in 2005. In the spring of 2005, he had just finished his freshman year when he decided he wanted to go into music production. He was looking to change colleges when he got a call from his music pastor at Evangel Church in Scotch Plains. One of the pastor's friends, Paul Kevin Jonas Sr., had three sons, Kevin, Nick, and Joe, who were putting together a band and were looking for a bass player. The pastor recommended Garbowsky to Jonas Sr. Garbowsky began touring professionally when he was 18 years old.

== Career ==
=== DNCE ===
In 2015, Garbowsky became the manager of the Republic signed group DNCE with former band mates Joe Jonas as lead vocals and Jack Lawless as drums.

=== Ocean Grove ===
In 2011, Garbowsky's band Ocean Grove released their first EP "Little Record" on iTunes. They will be touring with indie pop band He Is We this summer.

=== Songwriting ===
He has co-written songs with the Jonas Brothers, including "Tonight" off of the 2008 Hollywood Records release A Little Bit Longer. "Tonight" reached up to #8 on the Billboard Hot 100. Also, the song "Games" off of the album Jonas Brothers, released in 2007. "Tonight" was remixed by Timbaland in 2009 for a special download through Verizon phones.

Gregory Garbowsky also co-wrote the songs "Poison Ivy" and "Fly with Me" which are on the Jonas Brothers' album Lines, Vines and Trying Times. "Fly with Me" is also featured in the end credits of the movie Night at the Museum 2: Battle of the Smithsonian.

He co-wrote the song "Full Moon Crazy" for the band, Honor Society. The song was on their first album, 'Fashionably Late', which came out on September 15, 2009. The song was also the title of Honor Society's first headlining tour.

Garbowsky co-wrote "In The End," "Last Time Around," and "Tonight" off of the Nick Jonas & the Administration album "Who I Am" released in 2010.

He also co-wrote "When I'm Gone" on the 2011 album Bury Me In My Rings by The Elected, a side-project of Rilo Kiley.

Garbowsky has written songs with Glen Ballard, The Veronicas, Delta Goodrem, Babyface and many others.

Garbowsky also gets writing credit on the final Jonas Brothers album "liVe" (2013), which was given through the Team Jonas Fan Club. He co-wrote "Found" with Nick Jonas.

=== Performances ===
Garbowsky has been on every tour with the Jonas Brothers since their start in 2005. In addition, he has also played bass as part of special live performances with Stevie Wonder, Brad Paisley, Martina McBride, Steven Curtis Chapman, Michael W. Smith, Amy Grant, Vince Gill, Dan Aykroyd, Demi Lovato, Jordin Sparks, Honor Society, Jesse McCartney, Taylor Swift, Miley Cyrus, and Hannah Montana.

He also was in the band 'Level Zero', when he was in college. They participated in a "Battle of the Bands" competition at Seton Hall, and won. Presently, the band is still playing in the New Jersey area under the name "Afterall".

=== Television and film ===
Garbowsky has performed alongside the Jonas Brothers on many television shows and awards shows including Good Morning America, Late Night with Jimmy Fallon, and The Tonight Show with Jay Leno. Moreover, he has appeared in several episodes of Jonas Brothers: Living the Dream with the Jonas Brothers. He also appeared in the theatrical concert films for Miley Cyrus and Jonas Brothers.

== Personal life ==
On April 14, 2012, Garbowsky married musician Paris Carney. He is the brother-in-law of musician Zane Carney and musician/actor Reeve Carney.
