= Jonas Brothers (album) =

Studio album by Jonas Brothers
- Released: August 7, 2007
- Recorded: February–March 2007
- Genre: Pop punk
- Length: 42:49
- Label: Hollywood
- Producer: John Fields

Jonas Brothers chronology
It's About Time (2006)	Jonas Brothers (2007)	A Little Bit Longer (2008)

Alternative covers
- Bonus Jonas Edition

Alternative cover
- Cover released in Japan, Malaysia, the Philippines, Australia, South America and New Zealand

Singles from Jonas Brothers
- 1. "Year 3000" Released: March 12, 2007; 2. "Hold On" Released: May 22, 2007; 3. "S.O.S" Released: August 3, 2007; 4. "When You Look Me in the Eyes" Released: December 28, 2007

Jonas Brothers is the second studio album released by the Jonas Brothers. It is their first album to be released under Hollywood Records, and was released on August 7, 2007. "Hold On" was the album's second single, followed by "S.O.S" as the third single, and "When You Look Me in the Eyes" as the fourth single.

== Singles ==
"Year 3000", a cover of a song by the British band Busted, was serviced as the lead single from Jonas Brothers. Previously released in 2006 by Columbia from the album It's About Time, "Year 3000" was re-released by Hollywood Records on March 13, 2007. The song peaked at number 31 on the Billboard Hot 100 and sold 1,050,000 copies. "Hold On" was the official second single from the album and was released on May 22, 2007. It was featured in the Disney Channel Original Movie Johnny Kapahala: Back on Board, and a music video was released to promote the film. "S.O.S" was the album's third single and was released on August 3, 2007. It was the most successful single from the album, peaking at No. 47 in Australia on the ARIA Singles Chart, No. 49 on the Canadian Hot 100, No. 13 on the UK Singles Chart and No. 19 on the US Billboard Hot 100. It was their first single to chart in Canada and the UK. It was their first top-twenty hit in the United States. "When You Look Me in the Eyes" was the album's final single, released on December 28 and produced by John Fields. It was a re-recording of the version that initially appeared on Nick's self-titled solo album. It marked their third chart performance in Australia (No. 46 on the ARIA Singles Chart), their second in Canada and the UK (No. 30 on both the Canadian Hot 100 and the UK Singles Chart), and their fourth in the United States (No. 25 on the Billboard Hot 100, and their third top-40 song).

"Kids of the Future" was released as a single for the soundtrack to the 2007 animated motion picture Meet the Robinsons and later included in the Jonas Brothers' debut album.

== Reception ==
Professional ratings
Review scores
Source	Rating
AllMusic	3.5/5 stars
Contactmusic.com	1.5/5 stars
Cross Rhythms	7/10
Robert Christgau	(dud)

Stephen Thomas Erlewine of AllMusic described the band as "cheerful, good-natured, and, best of all, tuneful," going on to say about the album, "It all adds up an album that's tighter and better than their debut, and one that suggests that they not only deserve their popularity on Radio Disney, but they might have the writing and performing skills to last beyond that as well." Cross Rhythms praised the album saying, "Jonas Brothers have delivered an album that's high-energy pop-punk overflowing with catchy hooks and muscular guitar licks."

== Commercial performance ==
Jonas Brothers debuted at number five on the US Billboard 200 with 69,000 copies, becoming the Jonas Brothers' first top 10 album in the country. As of March 2015, the album has sold 2,409,000 million copies in the United States, becoming Jonas' best-selling album to date.

== Track listing ==
No.	Title	Writer(s)	Length
1.	"S.O.S"	Nick Jonas	2:33
2.	"Hold On"	Nick Jonas, Joe Jonas and Kevin Jonas	2:45
3.	"Goodnight and Goodbye"	Nick Jonas, Joe Jonas and Kevin Jonas	2:31
4.	"That's Just the Way We Roll"	Nick Jonas, Joe Jonas, Kevin Jonas and William McCauley III	2:53
5.	"Hello Beautiful"	Nick Jonas, Joe Jonas, Kevin Jonas	2:29
6.	"Still in Love with You"	Nick Jonas, Joe Jonas and Kevin Jonas	3:10
7.	"Australia"	Nick Jonas, Joe Jonas and Kevin Jonas	3:33
8.	"Games"	Nick Jonas, Joe Jonas, Kevin Jonas, John Taylor, Greg Garbowsky and Alex Noyes	3:21
9.	"When You Look Me in the Eyes"	Nick Jonas, Joe Jonas, Kevin Jonas Sr., Kevin Jonas, PJ Bianco and Raymond Boyd	4:09
10.	"Inseparable"	Nick Jonas, Joe Jonas, Kevin Jonas and Josh Miller	2:50
11.	"Just Friends"	Nick Jonas, Joe Jonas and Kevin Jonas	3:07
12.	"Hollywood"	Nick Jonas, Joe Jonas, Kevin Jonas and John Fields	2:49
13.	"Year 3000"	James Bourne, Charlie Simpson, Steve Robson and Matt Willis	3:22
14.	"Kids of the Future"	Marty Wilde, Ricky Wilde, Nick Jonas, Joe Jonas and Kevin Jonas	3:20
Total length:			42:49

Walmart bonus track
No.	Title	Length
15.	"Baby Bottle Pop Theme Song"	1:31
Total length:		43:49

The Bonus Jonas Edition bonus tracks
No.	Title	Writer(s)	Length
15.	"Take a Breath"	Nick Jonas, Joe Jonas, Kevin Jonas and Jess Cates	3:18
16.	"We Got the Party" (Hannah Montana featuring Jonas Brothers)	Kara DioGuardi, Greg Wells	3:36
Total length:			49:43

International edition
No.	Title	Writer(s)	Length
13.	"Take a Breath"	Nick Jonas, Joe Jonas, Kevin Jonas and Jess Cates	3:18
Total length:			42:43

Digital platform/2019 re-release bonus track
No.	Title	Writer(s)	Length
14.	"S.O.S." (Live)	Nick Jonas	2:54
Total length:			45:37

British bonus track
No.	Title	Writer(s)	Length
14.	"Out of This World"	Nick Jonas, Joe Jonas, Kevin Jonas and Zac Maloy	3:10
Total length:			45:53

Notes

- "Kids of the Future" does not appear on LP editions of the album

=== Bonus Jonas Edition DVD ===
Jonas Brothers: The Bonus Jonas Edition includes a DVD containing:

- Full concert performance at the Blender Theatre at Gramercy
1. "Kids of the Future"
2. "Just Friends"
3. "S.O.S"
4. "Goodnight & Goodbye"
5. "Hello Beautiful"
6. "Australia"
7. "That's Just the Way We Roll"
8. "Hollywood"
9. "Inseparable"
10. "Still in Love with You"
11. "Hold On"
12. "Year 3000"
- Music videos
  - "S.O.S"
  - "Hold On"
  - "Kids of the Future" (Live at the 2007 Disney Channel Games closing ceremony)
  - "Year 3000"

Total running time: approximately 55 minutes

Woolworths exclusive DVD (UK)

An exclusive DVD containing:

- Music videos
  - "S.O.S"
  - "Hold On"
  - "When You Look Me in the Eyes"
- Band in a Bus trailer
- "Jonas Brothers Meet The Queen" - Video from the Jonas Brother's YouTube channel

== Personnel ==
- Nick Jonas – vocals, rhythm guitar, keyboards, drums on "Australia"
- Joe Jonas – lead vocals
- Kevin Jonas – lead guitar, background vocals
- John Taylor – rhythm and lead guitar, background vocals
- John Fields – Producer, bass, additional keyboards and guitar, programming, string arrangements on "Inseparable"
- Dorian Crozier – drums, percussion, programming
- Greg Suran - additional guitar on "When You Look Me in the Eyes"
- Stephen Lu – string arrangements, conducting on "When You Look Me in the Eyes", "Hello Beautiful" and "Hold On"
- The Section Quartet - strings
- Chris Lord-Alge – mixing

== Charts ==
=== Weekly charts ===
Weekly chart performance for Jonas Brothers
Chart (2007–2010)	Peak position
Argentina Albums (EFE)	2
Australian Albums (ARIA)	43
Austrian Albums (Ö3 Austria)	14
Belgian Albums (Ultratop Flanders)	7
Belgian Albums (Ultratop Wallonia)	11
Brazil Albums (ABPD)	2
Canadian Albums (Billboard)	10
Chilean Albums (IFPI)	4
Danish Albums (Hitlisten)	9
Dutch Albums (Album Top 100)	65
European Albums (Billboard)	6
Finnish Albums (Suomen virallinen lista)	32
French Albums (SNEP)	16
German Albums (Offizielle Top 100)	19
Greek Albums (IFPI)	21
Irish Albums (IRMA)	14
Italian Albums (FIMI)	10
Mexican Albums (AMPROFON)	3
New Zealand Albums (RMNZ)	29
Norwegian Albums (VG-lista)	20
Polish Albums (ZPAV)	6
Portuguese Albums (AFP)	13
Scottish Albums (Official Charts)	9
South African Albums (RISA)	2
Spanish Albums (Promusicae)	5
Swedish Albums (Sverigetopplistan)	16
Swiss Albums (Schweizer Hitparade)	53
Taiwan Albums (G-Music)	10
UK Albums (Official Charts)	9
US Billboard 200	5
Venezuelan Albums (IFPI)	1

=== Year-end charts ===
2007 year-end chart performance for Jonas Brothers
Chart (2007)	Position
US Billboard 200	134

2008 year-end chart performance for Jonas Brothers
Chart (2008)	Position
US Billboard 200	17

== Certifications and sales ==
Certifications and sales for Jonas Brothers
Region	Certification	Certified units/sales
Argentina (CAPIF)	Platinum	68,000
Brazil (Pro-Música Brasil)	Platinum	60,000^{*}
Canada (Music Canada)	Platinum	100,000^{‡}
Ireland (IRMA)	Gold	7,500^{^}
Mexico (AMPROFON)	Platinum	100,000^{^}
Poland (ZPAV)	Gold	10,000^{*}
Portugal (AFP)	Gold	10,000^{^}
Spain (Promusicae)	Gold	40,000^{^}
United Kingdom (BPI)	Gold	100,000^{^}
United States (RIAA)	Platinum	2,409,000
^{*} Sales figures based on certification alone.^{^} Shipments figures based on certification alone.^{‡} Sales+streaming figures based on certification alone.

== Release history ==
Release dates and formats for Jonas Brothers
Region	Date	Format	Version	Label	Ref.
Canada	August 7, 2007	CD	Standard	Universal	
United States	August 7, 2007	CD	Standard	Hollywood	
United States	October 30, 2007	CD	The Bonus Jonas Edition	Hollywood	
Japan	December 5, 2007	CD	Standard	Universal	
Germany	June 13, 2008	CD	Standard	Universal	
United Kingdom	June 23, 2008	CD	Standard	Polydor	
