= Tonight (Jonas Brothers song) =

2008 single by Jonas Brothers

Single by Jonas Brothers

from the album A Little Bit Longer
- Released: January 4, 2009
- Recorded: 2007–08
- Genre: Pop rock; teen pop
- Length: 3:29
- Label: Hollywood
- Songwriters: Nick Jonas; Joe Jonas; Kevin Jonas; Greg Garbowsky
- Producer: John Fields

Jonas Brothers singles chronology
"Lovebug" (2008)	"Tonight" (2009)	"Paranoid" (2009)

Music video
- "Tonight" on YouTube

"Tonight" is a song by the American pop band Jonas Brothers from their third studio album, A Little Bit Longer (2008). It was released as the third and final single from the album on January 9, 2009. Fueled by digital downloads, the song debuted and peaked at number eight on the Billboard Hot 100 songs chart on August 7, 2008, the group's second top ten single and third highest-charting single to date. The song also reached the top twenty in Canada.

The song's official single release was confirmed at the 36th Annual American Music Awards. They also performed the song later that night during the show. They have confirmed that filming for the music video is complete and it will be sent to mainstream radio in early January. The song was released on January 4, 2009 and the music video was released on January 19, 2009.

== Background and composition ==
"Tonight"
A 20 second sample of "Tonight" by Jonas Brothers, where a portion of the chorus is heard.

According to the band's iTunes podcast, Jonas Brothers Countdown to A Little Bit Longer, Nick Jonas stated that:

"This song is about being in a relationship with somebody and getting into arguments that will not work out that night. It's also one of my favorite songs on the album."

USA Today's Ken Barnes called the song "pandemically infectious". Glenn Gamboa of Newsday likened the song to the music of Fall Out Boy, calling it "sleek, adrenalized good-time pop".

== Music video ==
The music video for "Tonight," was directed by Bruce Hendricks, director of Walt Disney Studios' Jonas Brothers: The 3D Concert Experience. It contains scenes from the 3D movie, including concert and backstage footage along with interaction with fans.

== Remix ==
- "Tonight" (Timbaland Remix) "Tonight" was remixed by Timbaland in 2009 for a special download through Verizon phones.
- "I Gotta Feeling/Tonight" (played on the 2009 World Tour with a mix of "I Gotta Feeling" of The Black Eyed Peas).

== Personnel ==
- Nick Jonas – lead vocals, guitar, drums, composer
- Joe Jonas – lead vocals, guitar, composer
- Kevin Jonas – backing vocals, guitar, composer
- John Taylor – backing vocals, guitar
- Greg Garbowsky – composer
- John Fields – producer

== Chart performance ==
"Tonight" was released on July 29, 2008 on the iTunes Store and soon reached number one on the iTunes Top Songs chart. It was the third song from A Little Bit Longer that reached number one on that chart.

With over 131,000 downloads in its initial week of release, "Tonight" was the highest debuting song on the Billboard Hot 100 in the issue dated August 16, 2008, coming in at number eight, without an official single release. The Jonas Brothers became the first act to have two songs debut in the top ten on the chart in the same calendar year since Madonna achieved the feat in 1998. The following week, "Tonight" fell to number 74. It premiered during the Kids Inaugural: We Are The Future on Disney Channel on January 19, 2009.

The song re-entered the Billboard Hot 100 at number 89 on February 26, 2009, on the back of promotion for the upcoming Jonas Brothers: The 3D Concert Experience. Then it gained 18 spots to number 71.

== Charts ==
Chart performance for "Tonight"
Chart (2008–09)	Peak position
Canada Hot 100 (Billboard)	13
Chile (EFE)	5
Columbia (EFE)	6
Costa Rica (EFE)	9
Mexico Ingles Airplay (Billboard)	17
US Billboard Hot 100	8
US Pop 100 (Billboard)	22

== Nick Jonas & the Administration version ==
"Tonight"

Song by Nick Jonas & the Administration

from the album Who I Am
- Released: 2010
- Recorded: 2009; Blackbird Studio's, Nashville, Tennessee
- Genre: Pop rock; soft rock
- Length: 4:19
- Label: Jonas; Hollywood
- Songwriters: Nick Jonas; Joe Jonas; Kevin Jonas; Greg Garbowsky
- Producer: John Fields

Nick covered the song for his side-project Nick Jonas & the Administration. The new version of the song appeared on their debut album Who I Am. On May 11, 2010, it the song was used on the live album: Nick Jonas & the Administration Live at the Wiltern January 28th, 2010.

=== Versions ===
- "Tonight" (Single Version, No Party) – 4:19
- "Tonight" (Live) – 5:47
- "Tonight" (acoustic) – 3:37

=== Music video ===
There was no official music video of the Administration version of the song. However, on the Limited Edition DVD, there was a video of Nick Jonas & the Administration performing "Tonight". The video was shot in black and white.

=== Live performances ===
They performed the new version of the song live for the first time during the Who I Am Tour.

They performed on January 30, 2010 an acoustic version of the song during Radio Disney Total Access.

=== Personnel ===
- Nick Jonas – lead vocals, lead guitar, composer
- Tommy Barbarella – keyboards
- Michael Bland – drums, vibraphone, vocals
- Sonny Thompson – guitars, vocals (on DVD Who I Am, and live performances)
- John Fields – bass, guitars, percussion, vibraphone, producer
- David Ryan Harris – guitars, vocals (on CD Who I Am)
- Joe Jonas – composer
- Kevin Jonas – composer
- Greg Garbowsky – composer
- Dave McNair – mastering
- Jon Lind – A&R
- David Snow – creative director
- Paul David Hager – mixing
- Philip McIntyre – management
- Johnny Wright – management
- Kevin Jonas Sr. – management

=== Release history ===
Region	Date	Format	Label
Germany	January 29, 2010	Digital download	Hollywood
United States	February 2, 2010	Digital download	Hollywood
