= A Little Bit Longer =

2008 studio album by Jonas Brothers

- Standard cover

Studio album by Jonas Brothers
- Released: August 12, 2008
- Studios: Wishbone (Los Angeles); Cherry Beach Sound (Toronto); The Saltmine (Mesa, AZ); The Gibson Bus; Capitol (Los Angeles)
- Genres: Rock; power pop
- Length: 39:31
- Label: Hollywood
- Producer: John Fields

Jonas Brothers chronology
Jonas Brothers (2007)	A Little Bit Longer (2008)	Music from the 3D Concert Experience (2009)

Singles from A Little Bit Longer
- 1. "Burnin' Up" Released: June 19, 2008; 2. "Lovebug" Released: September 30, 2008; 3. "Tonight" Released: February 17, 2009

A Little Bit Longer is the third studio album by the American pop rock band Jonas Brothers. It was released on August 12, 2008, through Hollywood Records. The album received generally favorable reviews from critics and was preceded by three singles, "Burnin' Up", "Lovebug" and "Tonight". The album was number 40 on Rolling Stone's Best 50 Albums of 2008. One of the songs from the album, "Video Girl" was also number 49 on Rolling Stone's list of the 100 Best Songs of 2008.

== Background ==
The title of the album, "A Little Bit Longer", comes from their song of the same name, which Nick Jonas wrote about his feelings with having type 1 diabetes. The album artwork was released by Team Jonas, the Jonas Brothers' official fan club, to fan club members via an e-mail newsletter on June 20, 2008.

== Promotion ==
On August 5, 2008, A Little Bit Longer was uploaded to MTV's The Leak, enabling the album to be streamed before it was released. The brothers performed their second single, "Lovebug" at the 2008 MTV Video Music Awards

One of the extra tracks, "Live to Party", was later the theme song for their television show Jonas.

=== Singles ===
"Burnin' Up" is the album's first single and was officially released on June 19, 2008. The music video for "Burnin' Up" premiered on Disney Channel, following the premiere of Camp Rock, a day after. The album's second single "Lovebug" was revealed at the 2008 MTV Video Music Awards. It was officially released on September 30, 2008. The official music video for "Lovebug" premiered on the Disney Channel on October 19, 2008. The album's third and final single "Tonight".

=== Promotional singles ===
"A Little Bit Longer" was released on August 5, 2008, as the first promotional single. On March 12, 2009, "Pushin' Me Away" was released as the second and final promotional single.

== Critical reception ==
Professional ratings
Aggregate scores
Source	Rating
Metacritic	66/100
Review scores
Source	Rating
AllMusic	4/5 stars
Entertainment Weekly	B+
Detroit Free Press	3/4 stars
The Gazette	3/5 stars
The Guardian	1/5 stars
Jesus Freak Hideout	3.5/5 stars
Los Angeles Times	2.5/5 stars
Rolling Stone	4/5 stars
Slant Magazine	2.5/5 stars
Toronto Star	2.5/4 stars

A Little Bit Longer received generally positive reviews from music critics. At Metacritic, the album received an above average score of 66 out of 100. In a 4-star review written by Rolling Stone editor Jody Rosen he stated, "The boys fantastic third album is steeped in the fuzzed-up guitars, three-part harmonies and cotton-candy choruses of Big Star and Cheap Trick. Power-pop die-hards awaiting the genre's commercial saviors must reckon with the fact that the messiahs have arrived". Natalie Nichols of the Los Angeles Times wrote, "The third album from the alpha boy band of the moment is certainly of the moment. Jersey-born Jonas siblings Nick (15), Kevin (20), and Joe (18) hit all the right pop notes with such numbers as the romping come-on 'Got Me Going Crazy', the slightly funky 'Burnin' Up' (a very pale imitation of Prince) and the emo-lite of brokenhearted ballad 'Can't Have You'".

In a mixed review from the Toronto Star, Ben Rayner when speaking about the albums demographic wrote, "Young hearts will melt, elder stomachs will churn", and "[A Little Bit Longer] has one uncritical audience in particular in mind and it serves it as well as can be expected".

== Commercial performance ==
A Little Bit Longer debuted at number one on the US Billboard 200 selling 525,402 copies in its first week, according to Nielsen SoundScan. The album also debuted at number one on the US Billboard Comprehensive Albums, Top Digital Albums, Top Internet Albums, and Tastemakers charts.

In its second week, the album remained at number one on the US Billboard 200 selling an additional 147,000 copies, making it the band's fastest selling album to date. In its third week, it fell to number four on the chart, selling another 80,000 copies. On October 17, 2008, the album was certified platinum by the Recording Industry Association of America (RIAA) for sales of over a million copies in the United States. As of March 2015, the album has sold 2,082,000 million copies in the United States.

== Track listing ==
All tracks are produced by John Fields.

A Little Bit Longer track listing
No.	Title	Writer(s)	Length
1.	"BB Good"	Nicholas Jonas; Joseph Jonas; Kevin Jonas II; John Taylor	2:56
2.	"Burnin' Up"	N. Jonas; J. Jonas; K. Jonas	2:54
3.	"Shelf"	N. Jonas; J. Jonas; K. Jonas	3:48
4.	"One Man Show"	N. Jonas; J. Jonas; K. Jonas	3:08
5.	"Lovebug"	N. Jonas; J. Jonas; K. Jonas	3:40
6.	"Tonight"	N. Jonas; J. Jonas; K. Jonas; Greg Garbowsky	3:29
7.	"Can't Have You"	N. Jonas; PJ Bianco	4:28
8.	"Video Girl"	N. Jonas; J. Jonas; K. Jonas	2:53
9.	"Pushin' Me Away"	N. Jonas; J. Jonas; K. Jonas	3:03
10.	"Sorry"	N. Jonas; J. Jonas; K. Jonas; John Fields	3:12
11.	"Got Me Going Crazy"	N. Jonas	2:35
12.	"A Little Bit Longer"	N. Jonas	3:25
Total length:			39:31

Japanese edition track listing
No.	Title	Writer(s)	Length
1.	"When You Look Me in the Eyes"	N. Jonas; J. Jonas; K. Jonas; Kevin Jonas Sr.; Bianco; Raymond Boyd	4:09
14.	"Hello Goodbye"	John Lennon; Paul McCartney	2:07
15.	"Live to Party"	N. Jonas; J. Jonas; K. Jonas	2:58
16.	"Infatuation"	David Darlington; Thomas G:son; Toshiya Kamada; Atsushi Kosugi	3:30
Total length:			52:16

Japanese deluxe edition track listing
No.	Title	Writer(s)	Length
1.	"When You Look Me in the Eyes"	N. Jonas; J. Jonas; K. Jonas; K. Jonas Sr.; Bianco; Boyd	4:09
14.	"Hello Goodbye"	Lennon; McCartney	2:07
15.	"Infatuation"	Darlington; G:son; Kamada; Kosugi	3:30
16.	"Burnin' Up" (live)	N. Jonas; J. Jonas; K. Jonas	3:48
17.	"Shelf" (live)	N. Jonas; J. Jonas; K. Jonas	4:56
18.	"Pushin' Me Away" (live)	N. Jonas; J. Jonas; K. Jonas	3:23
19.	"A Little Bit Longer" (live)	N. Jonas	8:38
Total length:			1:06:05

Japanese deluxe edition bonus DVD
No.	Title	Length
1.	""When You Look Me in the Eyes" (music video)"	4:16
2.	""Burnin' Up" (music video)"	3:26
3.	""Burnin' Up" ("Making of the Video")"	5:01
4.	""Lovebug" (music video)"	4:19
5.	""Lovebug" ("Making of the Video")"	4:22
6.	"JB Special Message"	0:21
7.	"A Little Bit Longer: Album piece with exclusive photo gallery"	2:15
8.	"A Little Bit Longer: Clear Channel Stripped performance"	3:24
9.	"Band in a Bus trailer"	3:15
10.	"YouTube videos: DJ Danger (0:55); Nick J Show (0:54); Taichi (1:13); Gibson Surprise Visit (0:44); Look Me in the Eyes Tour Makes History (0:53); Meet the Queen Josephyne (1:54)"	6:53
Total length:		37:32

Target edition
No.	Title	Writer(s)	Length
13.	"Hello Goodbye"	John Lennon; Paul McCartney	2:07
Total length:			41:41

Walmart edition
No.	Title	Writer(s)	Length
13.	"Live to Party"	N. Jonas; J. Jonas; K. Jonas	2:58
Total length:			42:32

Australian edition
No.	Title	Writer(s)	Length
14.	"Hello Goodbye"	Lennon; McCartney	2:07
Total length:			44:08

European edition
No.	Title	Writer(s)	Length
13.	"When You Look Me in the Eyes"	N. Jonas; J. Jonas; K. Jonas; Kevin Jonas Sr.; PJ Bianco; Raymond Boyd	4:09
Total length:			40:45

UK edition
No.	Title	Writer(s)	Length
14.	"Live to Party"	N. Jonas; J. Jonas; K. Jonas	2:58
Total length:			43:43

== Exclusive DVDs ==
Target Exclusive DVD

The Target edition of A Little Bit Longer includes a DVD with the following:

- "JB Rules"
- Live videos from the Disney Channel Games 2008:
  - "S.O.S."
  - "Burnin' Up"
  - "This Is Me" (with Demi Lovato)

Jonas Brothers official site pre-order bonus DVD

Fans that pre-ordered A Little Bit Longer online before its release received a DVD with the following:

- Jonas Brothers' special message
- A Little Bit Longer album piece
- "A Little Bit Longer" (acoustic live performance)
- "Lovebug" (acoustic performance)
- Band in a Bus trailer
- Jonas Brothers YouTube videos

Woolworths (UK) Exclusive DVD

Buyers of the CD had the option to get an exclusive DVD at extra cost, As they did with "Jonas Brothers" & "Camp Rock"

- Jonas Brothers' special message
- A Little Bit Longer album piece
- Band in a Bus trailer
- Jonas Brothers YouTube videos

UK "FanPack"

Released in the UK, a limited edition Fan pack containing

- Regular version of the album cd
- Girls skinny fit teeshirt
- Tote bag
- Bracelet
- 4 Pin Badges
- All contained inside a clear vanity case with Jonas Brothers emblem

Canadian deluxe edition

The Canadian Deluxe Edition of A Little Bit Longer includes a DVD with the following:

- Live @ Much: Jonas Brothers- A MuchMusic Special Presentation
- A Little Bit Longer Album Piece
- Band in a Bus Trailer
- Jonas Brothers YouTube videos;
  - DJ Danger
  - Nick J Show- Anger
  - Tai Chi
  - Nick J Show- Revenge
  - Gibson Surprise Visit
  - Look Me in the Eyes Makes History
  - Meet the Queen
- Music videos
  - "Burnin' Up"
  - "Lovebug"

== Personnel ==
Jonas Brothers

- Joe Jonas – vocals
- Kevin Jonas – guitar, mandolin, vocals
- Nick Jonas – guitar, keyboards, vocals
- John Lloyd Taylor – guitar, vocals

Additional personnel

- John Fields – bass, keyboards, guitar, programming, string arrangement on "Sorry"
- Dorian Crozier – drums, percussion, keyboards, programming
- Stephen Lu – string arrangement, conducting on "Shelf", "A Little Bit Longer", "Video Girl", "Can't Have You"
- Eric Gorfain – violin
- Daphne Chen – violin
- Leah Katz – viola
- Richard Dodd – cello (The Section Quartet appears courtesy of Decca)
- Big Rob – vocals on "Burnin' Up"
- Meaghan Martin – vocals on "Video Girl"
- Ken Chastain – tambourine on "Video Girl"

== Charts ==
=== Weekly charts ===
Weekly chart performance for A Little Bit Longer
Chart (2008–2010)	Peak position
Australian Albums (ARIA)	13
Austrian Albums (Ö3 Austria)	27
Belgian Albums (Ultratop Flanders)	75
Belgian Albums (Ultratop Wallonia)	58
Brazil Albums (ABPD)	1
Canadian Albums (Billboard)	1
Croatian Albums (IFPI)	30
Danish Albums (Hitlisten)	38
Dutch Albums (Album Top 100)	40
European Albums (Billboard)	6
French Albums (SNEP)	14
German Albums (Offizielle Top 100)	23
Greek Albums (IFPI)	21
Hungarian Albums (MAHASZ)	39
Irish Albums (IRMA)	15
Italian Albums (FIMI)	2
Japanese Albums (Oricon)	35
Mexican Albums (AMPROFON)	1
New Zealand Albums (RMNZ)	11
Norwegian Albums (VG-lista)	27
Polish Albums (ZPAV)	11
Portuguese Albums (AFP)	27
Scottish Albums (Official Charts)	22
South African Albums (RISA)	14
Spanish Albums (Promusicae)	3
Swedish Albums (Sverigetopplistan)	54
Swiss Albums (Schweizer Hitparade)	55
Taiwan Albums (G-Music)	15
UK Albums (Official Charts)	19
US Billboard 200	1

=== Year-end charts ===
Year-end chart performance for A Little Bit Longer
Chart (2008)	Position
US Billboard 200	25
Chart (2009)	Position
US Billboard 200	77

== Certifications and sales ==
Certifications and sales for A Little Bit Longer
Region	Certification	Certified units/sales
Brazil (Pro-Música Brasil)	Platinum	60,000^{*}
Canada (Music Canada)	2× Platinum	160,000^{‡}
GCC (IFPI Middle East)	Gold	3,000^{*}
Ireland (IRMA)	Gold	7,500^{^}
Italy	—	50,000
Mexico (AMPROFON)	Platinum	80,000^{^}
New Zealand (RMNZ)	Gold	7,500^{^}
Poland (ZPAV)	Gold	10,000^{*}
Spain (Promusicae)	Platinum	80,000^{^}
United Kingdom (BPI)	Gold	100,000^{^}
United States (RIAA)	Platinum	2,082,000
^{*} Sales figures based on certification alone.^{^} Shipments figures based on certification alone.^{‡} Sales+streaming figures based on certification alone.

== Release history ==
Country	Date
United States	August 12, 2008
Canada	August 12, 2008
Brazil	August 12, 2008
Argentina	August 21, 2008
Colombia	August 21, 2008
Hong Kong	August 26, 2008
United Kingdom	September 29, 2008
Europe	October 3, 2008
Philippines	October 6, 2008
Australia	October 13, 2008
New Zealand	October 13, 2008
South Africa	November 14, 2008
Taiwan	November 14, 2008
Canada (Deluxe Edition)	December 9, 2008
Japan	January 14, 2009
