= Pushin' Me Away =

Promotional single by Jonas Brothers

from the album A Little Bit Longer
- Released: July 14, 2008
- Recorded: 2008
- Genre: Pop punk; pop rock
- Length: 3:03
- Label: Hollywood
- Songwriters: Nick Jonas; Joe Jonas; Kevin Jonas
- Producer: John Fields

"Pushin' Me Away" is a song by American pop rock band the Jonas Brothers for their third studio album A Little Bit Longer (2008). It was written by band members Nick Jonas, Joe Jonas and Kevin Jonas; production was helmed by John Fields. The song is a pop rock and teen pop influenced track. "Pushin' Me Away" received generally favorable reviews from contemporary music critics, who complimented its overall production. It was released as the second promotional single from the album and peaked at number 16 on the U.S. Billboard Hot 100.

== Release ==
"Pushin' Me Away"
An eighteen second sample of "Pushin' Me Away"

"Pushin' Me Away" was supposed to have been released on July 15, 2008, and it is the release date for the song on the iTunes music store, but the song went on sale on the evening of July 14, 2008.

Like all the other songs this song was recorded during The Best of Both Worlds Tour where they were the opening act. The song was also used in Jonas Brothers: The 3D Concert Experience.

== Charts ==
=== Weekly charts ===
Chart (2008)	Peak position
US Billboard Hot 100	16
US Digital Song Sales (Billboard)	2
US Pop 100 (Billboard)	27
