= When You Look Me in the Eyes =

Song by Jonas Brothers

Single by Jonas Brothers

from the album Jonas Brothers
- B-side: "S.O.S" (Live version)
- Released: December 28, 2007
- Recorded: July 2, 2007
- Genre: Pop rock
- Length: 4:09
- Label: Hollywood
- Songwriters: Nick Jonas; Joe Jonas; Kevin Jonas; Kevin Jonas Sr.; PJ Bianco; Raymond Boyd
- Producer: John Fields

Jonas Brothers singles chronology
"S.O.S" (2007)	"When You Look Me in the Eyes" (2007)	"We Rock" (2008)

Music video
- "When You Look Me in the Eyes" on YouTube

"When You Look Me in the Eyes"

Song by Nick Jonas

from the album Nicholas Jonas
- Released: 2005
- Length: 4:03
- Label: INO; Daylight; Columbia
- Songwriters: Nick Jonas; Joe Jonas; Kevin Jonas; Kevin Jonas Sr.; PJ Bianco; Raymond Boyd

"When You Look Me in the Eyes" is a song by the American pop rock band Jonas Brothers. The song was released as the fourth and final single from their self-titled second album, on December 28, 2007. In the United Kingdom, it was released as a double-A side with "Burnin' Up".

An earlier version of the song, featuring different lyrics and production, was released in 2005 on Nick Jonas' debut album, Nicholas Jonas.

The band's When You Look Me in the Eyes Tour was named after the song, their most current single at the time of the tour. The song was released as the first single on the band's third album A Little Bit Longer in Japan, re-titled in Japanese as "Mitsumeau Koi" (見つめあう恋, "Love Is Watching Each Other").

== Background and composition ==
"When You Look Me in the Eyes"
A 23 second sample of "When You Look Me in the Eyes" by Jonas Brothers, where a portion of the chorus is heard.

"When You Look Me in the Eyes", according to About.com's Bill Lamb, "avoids wallowing in cliche by featuring the ever-present youthful energy of Nick and Joe Jonas sharing vocals. Turning the song into a vocal duet lifts this record well above banality."

== Music video ==
The music video premiered on December 28, 2007, on YouTube and on the Disney Channel after the worldwide premiere of Minutemen, and on April 20, 2008, on Disney Channel Asia. It shows the Jonas Brothers playing the song during a concert and footage of their personal lives. The video also features the brothers' younger brother, Frankie Jonas, and is in black-and-white. The Disney Channel edit of the video features fans holding up a different sign from the one featured in the edit of the video released elsewhere. The video includes pieces filmed by Joe. Most of the music video was filmed inside The Eagles Club (The Rave) or outside in downtown Milwaukee, Wisconsin and in the Chicago, Illinois area.

== Track listing ==
US and Europe CD single

1. "When You Look Me in the Eyes" (album version) — 4:09
2. "S.O.S" (live version) — 2:35

== Chart performance ==
"When You Look Me in the Eyes" reached number 25 on the U.S. Billboard Hot 100. On August 15, 2008, the song re-entered the Australian ARIA Singles Chart, peaking at number 46; it became their highest-peaking song on the chart, surpassing "S.O.S" (number 47), but this record was surpassed again, with "Burnin' Up", peaking at number 38. It entered the UK Singles Chart at number 30, as part of a double-A side with "Burnin' Up". It has sold 1,180,000 copies in the US.

== Charts ==
=== Weekly charts ===
Weekly chart performance for "When You Look Me in the Eyes"
Chart (2007)	Peak position
Australia (ARIA)	46
Belgium (Ultratip Bubbling Under Flanders)	2
Canada Hot 100 (Billboard)	30
Chile (EFE)	6
Costa Rica (EFE)	7
Japan (Japan Hot 100)	3
Netherlands (Dutch Top 40 Tipparade)	12
Netherlands (Single Top 100)	92
Romania (Romanian Top 100)	95
Scotland Singles (OCC)	12
UK Singles (OCC)	30
US Billboard Hot 100	25
US Adult Pop Airplay (Billboard)	38
US Pop Airplay (Billboard)	16
Venezuela Pop Rock (Record Report)	3

=== Year-end charts ===
Year-end chart performance for "When You Look Me in the Eyes"
Chart (2008)	Position
Brazil (Crowley)	50

== Certifications ==
Certifications for "When You Look Me in the Eyes"
Region	Certification	Certified units/sales
Canada (Music Canada)	Gold	40,000^{‡}
United Kingdom (BPI) with "Burnin' Up"	Silver	200,000^{‡}
^{‡} Sales+streaming figures based on certification alone.

== Release history ==
Release dates and formats for "When You Look Me in the Eyes"
Region	Date	Format	Label	Ref.
United States	February 4, 2008	Contemporary hit radio	Hollywood	
Germany	February 13, 2008	CD single	Universal	
