= Lovebug (Jonas Brothers song) =

Single by Jonas Brothers

from the album A Little Bit Longer
- Released: September 8, 2008
- Recorded: 2007
- Length: 3:40 (album version); 3:26 (radio edit)
- Label: Hollywood
- Songwriters: Nick Jonas; Joe Jonas; Kevin Jonas
- Producer: John Fields

Jonas Brothers singles chronology
| "Burnin' Up" (2008) | "Lovebug" (2008) | "Tonight" (2009) |

Music video
- "Lovebug" on YouTube

"Lovebug" is a song by the American pop rock band Jonas Brothers. It was released as the third official single off their third studio album, A Little Bit Longer, on September 8, 2008. Lyrically, "Lovebug" is about being smitten by a girl for the first time and attracting feelings for said girl from that moment. A music video was released to accompany the single and is a period piece romance that was inspired by The Notebook.

== Background and composition ==
"Lovebug"
A 22 second sample of "Lovebug" by Jonas Brothers, where a portion of the chorus is heard.

The song was written while on tour with Miley Cyrus on her Best of Both Worlds Tour. Nick said that "we were in the hotel room and sat down that night and wrote it in about 15 or 20 minutes." The song was confirmed to be the second single from the album on August 12, 2008.

The song first premiered at the 2008 MTV Video Music Awards, where the Jonas Brothers performed it on the backlot of Paramount Studios in Hollywood, California.

== Music video ==
Disney Channel featured the Sunday night premiere of the "Lovebug" music video on October 19, 2008 (8:55 p.m., ET/PT). An exclusive look at the making of the video was presented throughout the evening (8:00 – 9:00 p.m., ET/PT) during episodes of Hannah Montana and Wizards of Waverly Place.

Directed by Philip Andelman (who has directed music videos for Demi Lovato and John Mayer), is a period piece that depicts the love story between a young woman and a sailor as he is preparing to deploy to war. Kevin Jonas explained that The Notebook was one of the inspirations for the video.

Kevin, Joe and Nick portray different characters, including members of a ballroom band. A sweeping dance routine, 1950s fashion and cars bring the Jonas Brothers' vision to life. Camilla Belle and Josh Boswell also star.

== In popular media ==
- The Jonas Brothers made a cameo in Night at the Museum: Battle of the Smithsonian as cherubs. They sang a snippet of the song immediately after singing a cover of Celine Dion's "My Heart Will Go On" from Titanic.
- Performed on a Dancing with the Stars season seven result show by Mark Ballas, Derek Hough, Lacey Schwimmer, and Inna Brayer.
- The first verse was sung and played by John Grimes on the ITV2 show Jedward: Let Loose.

== Track listing ==
- CD single
1. "Lovebug" – 3:40
2. "Shelf" (Live Version) – 4:54
- 10" picture disc
1. "Lovebug" – 3:41
2. "Lovebug" (Live in Los Angeles 2013) – 4:17

== Chart performance ==
"Lovebug" debuted on the week ending September 27, 2008 at number 84 on the Billboard Hot 100 chart. It first peaked at number 57 on the week ending November 9, 2008 before leaving five weeks later. On the week ending January 10, 2009, it reappeared and reached a new peak at number 49. It has sold 857,000 copies in the US. It debuted at number 84 on the Canadian Hot 100 and first peaked at number 70 before falling off the chart and reappearing on the week ending January 10, 2009 at number 45. The song was given a digital release in Australia and peaked at number 95.

== Charts ==
Chart performance for "Lovebug"
| Chart (2008–2009) | Peak position |
|---|---|
| Australia (ARIA) | 95 |
| Canada Hot 100 (Billboard) | 45 |
| Chile (EFE) | 5 |
| Costa Rica (EFE) | 6 |
| El Salvador (EFE) | 1 |
| Guatemala (EFE) | 4 |
| Lithuania (European Hit Radio) | 56 |
| Mexico Airplay (Billboard) | 44 |
| Mexico Ingles Airplay (Billboard) | 9 |
| UK Singles (Official Charts) | 92 |
| US Billboard Hot 100 | 49 |
| US Pop Airplay (Billboard) | 29 |
| Venezuela Top Anglo (Record Report) | 8 |

== Certifications ==
Certifications for "Lovebug"
| Region | Certification | Certified units/sales |
|---|---|---|
| Canada (Music Canada) | Platinum | 80,000^{‡} |
^{‡} Sales+streaming figures based on certification alone.

== Release history ==
Release dates and formats for "Lovebug"
| Region | Date | Format | Label | Ref. |
|---|---|---|---|---|
| United States | September 8, 2008 | Contemporary hit radio | Hollywood | |
| United Kingdom | December 1, 2008 | CD single | Polydor | |
