= Hold On (Jonas Brothers song) =

Single by Jonas Brothers

from the album Jonas Brothers
- B-side: "Take a Breath"
- Released: May 22, 2007
- Recorded: February 2007
- Genre: Arena rock; pop punk; power pop
- Length: 2:45
- Label: Hollywood
- Songwriters: Nicholas Jonas; Joseph Jonas; Kevin Jonas II
- Producer: John Fields

Jonas Brothers singles chronology
"Year 3000" (2006)	"Hold On" (2007)	"S.O.S" (2007)

Music video
- "Hold On" on YouTube

"Hold On" is a song by American pop rock band Jonas Brothers. The song was released as the second single from their self-titled second album and was released on May 22, 2007. The iTunes Store named this single as number three on their "Best of the Store" Playlist on August 7, 2007.

== Background and composition ==
"Hold On"
A 16 second sample of "Hold On" by Jonas Brothers, where a portion of the chorus is heard.

"Hold On" was written by Nick Jonas, Joe Jonas and Kevin Jonas. According to Nick Jonas, the song was one of the first tracks written for their self-titled album. Explaining why they chose the song as the lead single, Kevin Jonas stated, "I think it was the first song that really captured the transition from the first album to this one... this was our song that we wrote, and people heard what we wanted to say." Speaking about the song's meaning, Joe Jonas stated, "You could be in any situation, but you're holding on because you don't want to give up on love. Say you're in a terrible situation, you can always find the light if you look hard enough."

It is featured on the Disney Channel Original Movie, Johnny Kapahala: Back on Board and the film Free Style.

== Critical reception ==
Billboard called the track, "a true classic," praising the song lyrically and musically. They stated, "From the second the song starts with pulsating electric guitar, the Jonas Brothers' vocals take off – particularly on the titular hook – as they send a message of hope for those experiencing heartbreak or simply going through a tough time."

== Music video ==
The music video for "Hold On" was released on May 22, 2007 and was directed by Declan Whitebloom. The video starts with the band grabbing their instruments and playing them. There, Joe Jonas starts singing as they play instruments. Then while the second chorus is being sung the walls and the roof fly away leaving the band on a windy desert only with their instruments. They keep singing as the wind hits on their faces. The song ends as the wind stops.

== Chart performance ==
In August 2007, "Hold On" debuted at number 92 on the Billboard Hot 100, becoming the band's second charting single in their career (the first being "Year 3000", which peaked at number 31). The single peaked at number 53 on the Hot 100.

== Live performances ==
"Hold On" is featured on multiple Jonas Brothers tours, including their Happiness Begins Tour. The group also performed the song live on their The Tour.

== Track listing ==
Digital download
No.	Title	Length
1.	"Hold On"	2:44

CD single
No.	Title	Length
1.	"Hold On"	2:44
2.	"Hold On" (instrumental)	2:44

7" vinyl
No.	Title	Length
1.	"Hold On"	2:45
2.	"Take a Breath"	3:19

== Personnel ==
Jonas Brothers

- Nick Jonas – vocals, rhythm guitar, keyboards
- Joe Jonas – vocals
- Kevin Jonas – lead guitar, backing vocals

Production

- Kevin Jonas Sr – executive producer
- Jon Lind – executive producer, A&R
- Ted Jensen – mastering
- Chris Lord-Alge – mixing
- Keith Armstrong – assistant mixing
- John Fields – recording, producer
- PJ Bianco – additional recording
- Ross Hogarth – additional recording
- Steven Miller – additional recording

== Charts ==
Chart performance for "Hold On"
Chart (2007–08)	Peak position
Australia Hitseekers (ARIA)	13
Belgium (Ultratop 50 Flanders)	26
Belgium (Ultratop 50 Wallonia)	29
Chile (EFE)	4
Costa Rica (EFE)	8
UK Singles (OCC)	106
US Billboard Hot 100	53

== Release history ==
Release dates and formats for "Hold On"
Region	Date	Format	Label	Ref.
United States	May 27, 2007	Digital download	Hollywood	
Various	July 24, 2007	Digital download	Hollywood	
