= Burnin' Up (Jonas Brothers song) =

Single by Jonas Brothers

from the album A Little Bit Longer
- Released: June 19, 2008
- Recorded: 2008
- Genre: Pop rock; teen pop; dance-rock; power pop
- Length: 2:54 (album version); 2:37 (No-Rap version)
- Label: Hollywood
- Songwriters: Nicholas Jonas; Joseph Jonas; Kevin Jonas II
- Producer: John Fields

Jonas Brothers singles chronology
"Play My Music" (2008)	"Burnin' Up" (2008)	"Lovebug" (2008)

Music video
- "Burnin' Up" on YouTube

"Burnin' Up" is the lead single from American pop rock band the Jonas Brothers' third studio album, A Little Bit Longer, and was officially released on June 19, 2008. It was released as a single and became a hit via digital downloads and peaked at number five on the Billboard Hot 100, becoming the group's first top five single in the US and formerly their highest-charting song as a group until "Sucker" was released in 2019. The song features uncredited vocals from American rapper Big Rob.

== Background and composition ==
"Burnin' Up"
A 17 second sample of "Burnin' Up" by Jonas Brothers, where a portion of the chorus is heard.

The band first performed this song on their When You Look Me in the Eyes Tour as well as at the 2008 Disney Channel Games. Their summer tour, titled the Burnin' Up Tour, is named after this song. The song also features a rap from their bodyguard, Robert "Big Rob" Feggans.

Entertainment Weekly stated that the song "was inspired by Jonas Brothers' unlikely appreciation for the work of babe magnet Prince." Nick Jonas also stated that the song is "about this girl — maybe she's at a party — and you feel that immediate connection [and] both know it's there." The song was also included on Grammy Nominees 2009.

== Critical reception ==
Time critic Josh Tyrangiel named this the sixth best song of 2008.

== Commercial performance ==
With strong digital sales, "Burnin' Up" debuted at number five on the US Billboard Hot 100, making it the band's most successful single until "Sucker" debuted at number one in March 2019. With more than 183,000 downloads and sold the single for the first week it went on sale. As of February 2015, it has sold 1.9 million copies in the US. In 2019, it was certified double platinum by the RIAA.

== Music video ==
The music video for "Burnin' Up" premiered after the premiere of Camp Rock on the Disney Channel on June 20, 2008. In the video, the brothers read over a potential video treatment and imagine how the video would play out, in which they are portrayed as action film stars. Nick as James Bond in Double Inferno, Joe as a Sonny Crockett parody in Hot Tropic, and Kevin as a Kung Fu master in The Burning Dragon. The video features cameo appearances from Selena Gomez, David Carradine, Robert Davi and Danny Trejo. The video was directed by Brendan Malloy and Tim Wheeler. The video was nominated for Video of the Year and Best Pop Video at the 2008 MTV Video Music Awards, but both lost to Britney Spears and the video for her song "Piece of Me".

== Track listing ==
US and Europe CD single

1. "Burnin' Up" – 2:54
2. "Burnin' Up (No-Rap)" – 2:37

== Charts ==
=== Weekly charts ===
Contemporaneous chart performance of "Burnin' Up"
Chart (2008)	Peak position
Australia (ARIA)	31
Austria (Ö3 Austria Top 40)	39
Belgium (Ultratip Bubbling Under Flanders)	29
Canada Hot 100 (Billboard)	14
Chile (EFE)	7
Costa Rica (EFE)	2
Denmark (Tracklisten)	39
European Hot 100 Singles (Billboard)	49
Germany (GfK)	35
Hungary (Editors' Choice Top 40)	19
Ireland (IRMA)	21
Italy (FIMI)	16
Latvia (European Hit Radio)	23
Mexico Anglo (Monitor Latino)	7
Netherlands (Single Top 100)	65
Netherlands (Tipparade)	5
Netherlands (TMF Superchart)	5
Norway (VG-lista)	12
Scottish Singles Sales (Official Charts)	12
UK Singles (Official Charts) "Burnin' Up" / "When You Look Me In The Eyes"	30
US Billboard Hot 100	5
US Pop 100 (Billboard)	9
US Pop Airplay (Billboard)	12
US Adult Pop Airplay (Billboard)	30
Venezuela (Record Report)	1

2023 chart performance of "Burnin' Up"
Chart (2023)	Peak position
Hot Trending Songs Chart (Billboard)	18

=== Year-end charts ===
Year-end chart rankings of "Burnin' Up"
Chart (2008)	Position
Canada (Canadian Hot 100)	76
US Billboard Hot 100	73
US Mainstream Top 40 (Billboard)	65

== Certifications ==
Region	Certification	Certified units/sales
Australia (ARIA)	Gold	35,000^{‡}
Canada (Music Canada)	3× Platinum	240,000^{‡}
New Zealand (RMNZ)	Platinum	30,000^{‡}
United Kingdom (BPI) with "When You Look Me in the Eyes"	Silver	200,000^{‡}
United States (RIAA)	2× Platinum	2,000,000^{‡}
^{‡} Sales+streaming figures based on certification alone.

== Release history ==
Release dates and formats for "Burnin' Up"
Region	Date	Format	Label	Ref.
United States	June 24, 2008	Digital download	Hollywood	
Australia	September 15, 2008	CD single	EMI	
Germany	September 19, 2008	CD single	Universal	
United Kingdom (Note: "Burnin' Up" was released as a double A-side with "When You Look Me in the Eyes" in the United Kingdom.)	September 22, 2008	CD single	Polydor	
Germany (Note: 2-track version)	September 26, 2008	CD single	Universal	
