= Frankie Jonas =

American singer and actor (born 2000)

Franklin Jonas
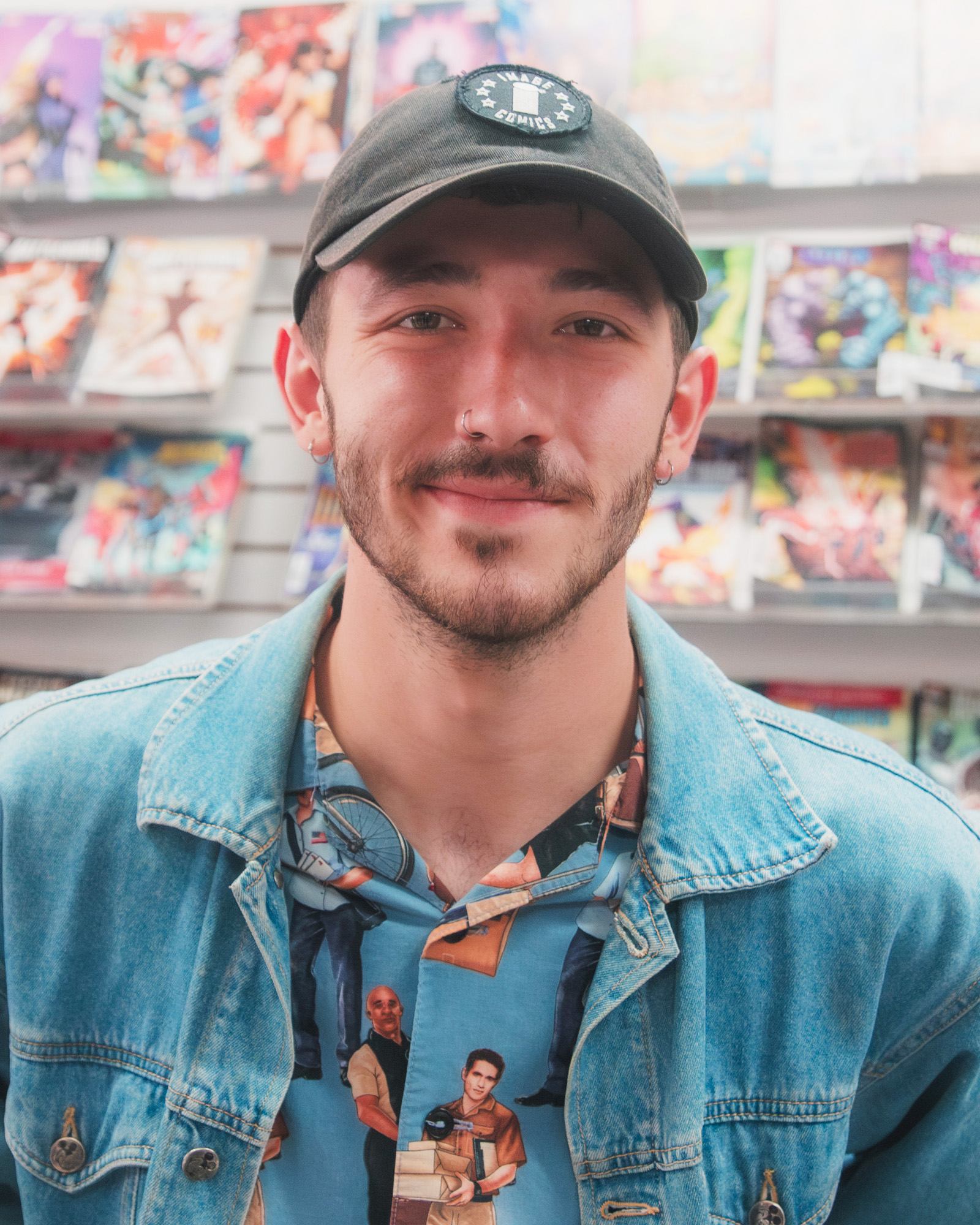
- Jonas in 2026

Background information
- Also known as: Frankie Jonas
- Born: Franklin Nathaniel Jonas; September 28, 2000 (age 26); Ridgewood, New Jersey, U.S.
- Education: Columbia University
- Occupations: Actor; singer
- Years active: 2008–present
- Member of: Franklin Jonas & The Byzantines
- Relatives: Kevin Jonas (brother); Joe Jonas (brother); Nick Jonas (brother); Danielle Jonas (sister in-law); Priyanka Chopra (sister in-law)

Franklin Nathaniel Jonas (born September 28, 2000) is an American singer and actor. Jonas voiced Sōsuke in the English dub of the 2008 film Ponyo and was a recurring character in the Disney Channel series Jonas. He also appeared in a minor role in the Disney Channel original film Camp Rock 2: The Final Jam. He has also made appearances on Married to Jonas on E! which follows the life of his brother Kevin Jonas. In 2009, Jonas won "Choice Breakout TV Star – Male" at the Teen Choice Awards. In 2023, he launched a music career as a singer and songwriter. He has released two singles and one extended play, Sewer Rat. Since 2025, he has released music with his band, Franklin Jonas & The Byzantines.

== Early life ==
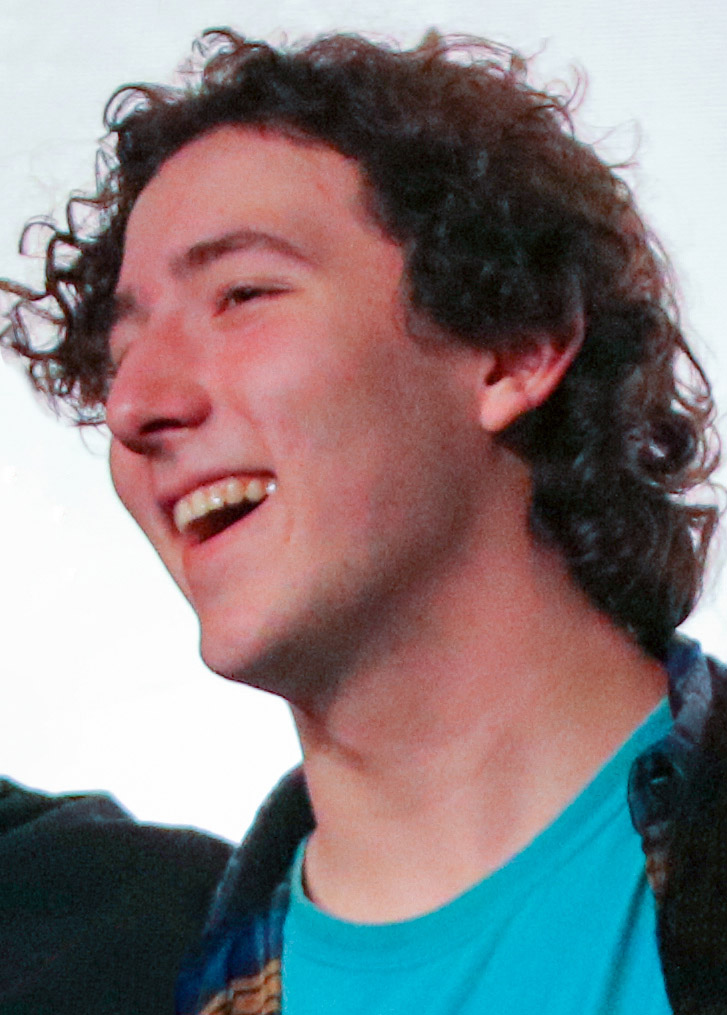
Jonas in 2019

Franklin Nathaniel Jonas was born on September 28, 2000, in Ridgewood, New Jersey, the youngest son of Denise (née Miller) and Paul Kevin Jonas Sr. He has three older brothers who make up the pop trio Jonas Brothers, Kevin (b. 1987), Joe (b. 1989), and Nick (b. 1992) He spent most of his teens residing in Southlake, Texas where the brothers bought a home and he attended Carroll Senior High School.

In 2019, Jonas graduated from the Blackbird Academy in Nashville with a certificate in audio engineering and moved to Los Angeles to start his career as a studio engineer. He started taking astrophysics and writing classes in November 2020 at Columbia University.

== Career ==
=== Child actor ===
In 2009, Jonas voice acted in Hayao Miyazaki's animated film Ponyo, released in American theaters on August 14, 2009. He played Sōsuke, a character who is befriended by a juvenile fish named Ponyo (voiced by Noah Cyrus), who wants to become a human girl. They both sing the theme song of the film. He appeared as a recurring character in the Disney Channel Original Series, Jonas for which he won the award for "Choice Breakout TV Star Male" at the 2009 Teen Choice Awards. His first on-screen film role was in Camp Rock 2: The Final Jam, alongside the Jonas Brothers as Junior Rocker Trevor. He also appeared in the E! reality show, Married to Jonas, following Kevin Jonas and his wife Danielle in their married life, including the comeback of the Jonas Brothers in late 2013.

=== Solo music career ===
In June 2017, Jonas posted his debut track on SoundCloud called "Shanghai Noon". Less than a year later, he uploaded "Appa" on the same platform. In January 2019, he produced Alli Haber's song "Too Young".

Jonas had 1.9 million followers on TikTok as of July 2022. On March 31, 2021, it was announced that Jonas had signed with UTA, the agency that represents his three older siblings.

He has been co-hosting ABC's Claim to Fame show with his brother Kevin Jonas since July 11, 2022.

In February 2023, Jonas released his debut single "Cocaine". He followed up with his second single release, "Hoboken" on April 26, 2023. Jonas made his live performance debut at Stagecoach Festival on April 29, 2023. He released his debut extended play Sewer Rat on June 21, 2023. The EP featured "Cocaine" and "Hoboken" as well as three new songs.

=== Franklin Jonas & The Byzantines ===
Since 2025, Jonas has been performing as the vocalist of his band, Franklin Jonas & The Byzantines, featuring guitarist Tim Bruns and banjo player Aidan Harbeson. In 2025, they released three singles, "Village Liquors", "Road Soda", and "Break the Levee". The following year, they released single "High And Sad", as well as a second version of the song with guest vocal from Noah Cyrus.

Franklin Jonas & The Byzantines opened for the Jonas Brothers on their 2025 tour, Jonas20: Greetings from Your Hometown Tour. In 2026, they opened for Hunter Hayes on his The Evergreen Tour; for The Maine as part of their tour, I Love You But I Chose The Maine; and for Nick Jonas on his solo tour, A Night with Nick. Their first headline tour, First of Many Tour kicked off in August 2026.

== Personal life ==
In a March 2021 interview, Jonas discussed his suicidal thoughts, alcoholism, and struggle to sobriety. He is a student at Columbia University taking astrophysics and academic writing classes.

Jonas dislikes being referred to as the "Bonus Jonas". His older brothers promised to stop calling him that after he said that he found it "hurtful".

In September 2021, Jonas, Charli D'Amelio, Suni Lee, and Lil Huddy received backlash after they were all seen wearing Scientology necklaces on TikTok. The prank was seen as distasteful considering the many scandals associated with Scientology. The post has since been deleted.

== Discography ==
=== Solo discography ===
==== Extended plays ====
Album	Album details
Sewer Rat	Released: June 21, 2023; Label: Pizzaslime Records; Formats: Digital download, streaming

==== Singles ====
Year	Song	Artist(s)
2010	"Ponyo on the Cliff by the Sea"	Noah Cyrus and Frankie Jonas
2023	"Cocaine"	Franklin Jonas
2023	"Hoboken"	Franklin Jonas
2023	"Grow Up"	Franklin Jonas
2023	"New Girl"	Franklin Jonas
2023	"Cherub"	Franklin Jonas

=== Franklin Jonas & The Byzantines ===
==== Singles ====
Year	Song	Featured artist(s)
2025	"Village Liquors"	—N/a
2025	"Road Soda"	—N/a
2025	"Break the Levee"	—N/a
2026	"Hoboken Revisited"	—N/a
2026	"High and Sad"	Noah Cyrus

== Filmography ==
=== Television ===
Year	Television	Role	Notes
2008	Jonas Brothers: Living the Dream	Himself	
2008	Jonas Brothers: Band in a Bus	Himself	
2009–2010	Jonas	Frankie Lucas	
2011–2013	The Haunting Hour: The Series	Dave and Steffan	Episodes: "Pumpkinhead", and "Coat Rack Cowboy".
2012–2013	Married to Jonas	Himself	Docu-soap
2022–present	Claim to Fame	Himself	Co-host with Kevin Jonas

=== Film ===
Year	Film	Role	Notes
2009	Ponyo	Sōsuke	Voice, English dub
2009	Night at the Museum: Battle of the Smithsonian	Kid in Museum	Uncredited
2009	Jonas Brothers: The 3D Concert Experience	Himself	Cameo
2010	Camp Rock 2: The Final Jam	Trevor	
2011	Jonas Brothers: The Journey	Himself	Unauthorized documentary
2011	Spooky Buddies	Pip	Voice
2012	The Reef 2: High Tide	Junior	Voice
2013	Gutsy Frog	Frankie	
2019	Jonas Brothers: Chasing Happiness	Himself	Documentary
2020	Jonas Brothers: Happiness Continues	Himself	Documentary, Concert Film
2025	A Very Jonas Christmas Movie	Himself	

=== Web ===
Year	Title	Role	Notes
2009	KSM: Read Between the Lines	Himself	Episode: "Hangin' with the Jonas Brothers"; cameo

=== Music videos ===
Year	Song	Artist
2008	"When You Look Me in the Eyes"	Jonas Brothers (cameo appearance)
2009	"Love Is on Its Way"	Jonas Brothers (cameo appearance)
2009	"Fly with Me"	Jonas Brothers (cameo appearance)
2009	"Ponyo On the Cliff By the Sea"	Noah Cyrus and Frankie Jonas
2012	"Sweet Baby"	Jru Driscoll (cameo appearance)
2017	"Remember I Told You"	(Nick Jonas featuring Anne-Marie & Mike Posner) (cameo appearance)

== Awards and nominations ==
Year	Award	Category	Role	Result
2009	Teen Choice Awards	Choice TV Breakout Star Male	Frankie Lucas on Jonas	Won
2009	CHILI OFF XVI	Chili Cook Off	Chili Cook	4th Place
2010	J-14 Teen Model Awards	Icon of Tomorrow	Biff	Nominated
2010	Great Chili Cook Off 2010	Chili Cook Off	Chili Cook	6th Place
2011	CHILI OFF XVIII	Chili Cook Off	Chili Cook	3rd Place
