= Jonas Brothers Family Roast =

2021 stand-up comedy special

- Official release poster
- Showrunner: James Longman
- Teleplay by: Lauren Greenberg (head writer)
- Directed by: Alex Van Wagner
- Presented by: Kenan Thompson
- Starring: Kevin Jonas; Joe Jonas; Nick Jonas; Danielle Jonas; Sophie Turner; Priyanka Chopra Jonas
- Country of origin: United States
- Original language: English

Production
- Executive producers: Emma Conway; Gabe Truner; James Longman
- Producers: Kevin Jonas; Joe Jonas; Nick Jonas
- Running time: 68 minutes
- Production company: Fulwell 73

Original release
- Network: Netflix
- Release: November 23, 2021

Jonas Brothers Family Roast is a 2021 stand-up comedy special starring American pop rock band Jonas Brothers. It was released globally on November 23, 2021, on Netflix. It was directed by Alex Van Wagner and produced by the brothers themselves and production company Fulwell 73.

The special was hosted by Kenan Thompson, and features guest appearances by the brother's wives, Danielle Jonas, Sophie Turner and Priyanka Chopra Jonas, comedians Pete Davidson and Gabriel Iglesias, as well as celebrities like Niall Horan, John Legend, Lilly Singh, Jack Whitehall and Blake Shelton.

== Synopsis ==
The Jonas Brothers host a family roast where guest stars, including their wives, poke fun at them. It also includes sketches, songs and games.

== Cast ==
- Kevin Jonas
- Joe Jonas
- Nick Jonas
- Danielle Jonas
- Sophie Turner
- Priyanka Chopra Jonas
- Frankie Jonas
- Pete Davidson
- Niall Horan
- Kenan Thompson
- Gabriel Iglesias
- John Legend
- Lilly Singh
- Jack Whitehall
- Blake Shelton

== Background ==
The special was first announced through a trailer, where comedian Pete Davidson, makes fun of the Jonas Brothers. It was marketed by Netflix as a "one of a kind comedy special" and its first family roast. In a statement shared with People, the streaming platform also announced that the Jonas Brothers' wives, Priyanka Chopra Jonas, Sophie Turner and Danielle Jonas, would join the roast as special guests.

On the weekend prior to the announcement, Joe Jonas had one of his videos go viral on TikTok, when he showed a picture of his younger brother, Nick, coming out of the water at the beach displaying digitally altered, unnaturally large nipples, from a photo that was released on the internet around 2014.

== Release ==
The stand-up comedy special was released globally on Netflix, on November 23, 2021.

== Reception ==
The special received mostly positive reviews from critics. Ishita Srivastava, from Indian website DailyO, described the roastings as funnier than she could expect, and that the jokes didn't held back on personal topics. Jack Colin, from The Hollywood Insider, wrote that the stand-up comedy was full of laughters that would please both long-term fans of the band, and those unaware of their careers. He was pleased by the professional comedians jokes, but that the Jonas wives' roasts were the highlight of the show.
