= A Very Jonas Christmas Movie =

2025 film directed by Jessica Yu

- Release poster
- Directed by: Jessica Yu
- Written by: Isaac Aptaker; Elizabeth Berger
- Produced by: Adam Fishbach; Kevin Jonas; Joe Jonas; Nick Jonas; Spencer Berman; Isaac Aptaker; Elizabeth Berger; Scott Morgan
- Starring: Kevin Jonas; Joe Jonas; Nick Jonas; Chloe Bennet; Billie Lourd; Laverne Cox; Andrew Barth Feldman; Randall Park; Jesse Tyler Ferguson
- Cinematography: Brendan Steacy
- Edited by: Peter CabadaHagan
- Music by: Siddhartha Khosla; Alan DeMoss
- Production companies: Disney Branded Television; 20th Television
- Distributed by: Disney+
- Release date: November 14, 2025
- Running time: 80 minutes
- Country: United States
- Language: English

A Very Jonas Christmas Movie is a 2025 American Christmas musical comedy film directed by Jessica Yu and written by Isaac Aptaker and Elizabeth Berger. It stars the Jonas Brothers (Kevin Jonas, Joe Jonas, and Nick Jonas) and Chloe Bennet.

The film was released on Disney+ and Hulu on November 14, 2025. It received positive reviews from critics, with particular praise directed at the music and the chemistry of the Jonas Brothers.

== Plot ==
After finishing their recent European tour in London, the Jonas Brothers long to return home to their families for the holidays. There are tensions between them, as each of them has different expectations about their role in the band. Santa Claus, who does not want them to break up, puts a curse on them that does not allow them to return home until they have worked out their issues. As the curse forms, the brothers' plane explodes due to a lightning strike.

Unable to book a new flight in London, the brothers head to Paris via train, which Santa detours to Amsterdam, where Joe meets an old friend, Lucy. As Joe loses their passports swimming with her and Nick fights old rival Ethan, they are forced to travel to Hamburg to hitchhike a flight. En route, Santa has their car break down and drives them in a lorry, where they reconcile. Santa seemingly lifts the curse and allows them to return home.

On the plane, the brothers argue and the pilot falls unconscious, leading to a crash-landing. Their arguing continues and they part ways, including the pilot. After they are attacked by wolves, they reconcile, leading Santa Claus to permanently lift the curse. They are found by their assistant, Brad and taken home in a helicopter. The brothers arrive home and celebrate Christmas together with their family, where Joe meets Lucy again and confesses his love for her.

One month later, the Jonas Brothers are on tour again.

During the credits, a video of Ethan apologizing to Nick is shown.

== Cast ==
- Kevin Jonas as Kevin
- Joe Jonas as Joe
- Nick Jonas as Nick
- Chloe Bennet as Lucy
- Billie Lourd as Cassidy
- Laverne Cox as Stacy
- Andrew Barth Feldman as Ethan
- Randall Park as Brad
- Jesse Tyler Ferguson as Santa
- Priyanka Chopra Jonas as Priyanka
- Danielle Jonas as Danielle
- KJ Apa as Gene
- Andrea Martin as Deb
- Kenny G as Kenny G
- Justin Tranter as Piano Player
- Will Ferrell as Will Ferrell
- Franklin Jonas as Franklin

== Production ==
In January 2025, it was announced that a Christmas comedy film, tentatively titled Jonas Brothers Christmas Movie, was in development for Disney+, with Jessica Yu directing, Isaac Aptaker and Elizabeth Berger writing the screenplay, and Kevin Jonas, Joe Jonas, and Nick Jonas starring as themselves. Chloe Bennet joined the cast as Lucy. Billie Lourd, Laverne Cox, KJ Apa, Andrew Barth Feldman, Randall Park, and Jesse Tyler Ferguson were later added to the cast. It was filmed in Toronto.

== Music ==
By November 2025, Siddhartha Khosla and Alan DeMoss had composed the score. The film features seven original songs by the Jonas Brothers, including "Coming Home This Christmas", featuring Kenny G.

== Release ==
The film's title and a first teaser were announced during JonasCon, a fan convention held by the Jonas Brothers to celebrate the band's 20th anniversary. A Very Jonas Christmas Movie was released on Disney+ and Hulu on November 14, 2025.

== Reception ==
=== Viewership ===
JustWatch, a guide to streaming content with access to data from more than 20 million users around the world, reported that A Very Jonas Christmas Movie was among the top-performing new Christmas releases of 2025, based on U.S. streaming popularity from January 1 to December 2, 2025. TVision, using its Power Score to evaluate CTV programming through viewership and engagement across over 1,000 apps, announced that it was the eleventh most-streamed film in the U.S. during December 2025.

=== Critical response ===
On the review aggregator website Rotten Tomatoes, 87% of 15 critics' reviews are positive.

Writing for The New York Times, Chris Azzopardi characterized A Very Jonas Christmas Movie as a deliberately "fan-oriented" holiday film that plays to the comic contrast between the Jonas Brothers' pop-star image and their current lives as "three extremely exhausted dads in our 30s." He noted that the film is fully self-aware, using a fantastical Santa-driven premise to explore sibling tensions that nevertheless "feel real." Azzopardi characterized the tone as a mix of "festive sugar rushes and nostalgic kitsch," praising the self-mocking script by Isaac Aptaker and Elizabeth Berger for its sly commentary on the brothers, while suggesting that although the songs are relatively slight, the dad jokes and brotherly roasting provide a "delightfully unserious" appeal. Liz Kocan of Decider described the film as a "smart" and "self-aware holiday comedy," arguing that it sets the bar "pretty high" for seasonal streaming releases. She highlighted the "tight" script and the Jonas Brothers' "believably tense but also funny" dynamic, noting that their interactions feel grounded in real sibling relationships. While she wrote that the songs help move the plot forward, Kocan emphasized that the film's main appeal lies in its comedy rather than its music. She also singled out Andrew Barth Feldman, writing that he "practically steals the whole movie," and noted that viewers "don’t have to be a Jonas Brothers fan to enjoy" the film.

Slate's Nadira Goffe described A Very Jonas Christmas Movie as “easy holiday viewing” that also reflects where the Jonas Brothers are in their career. She described the film as "perfectly fine" and family-friendly, praising the brothers' charm and noting that Nick Jonas works well as a comedic foil, Kevin is "heartwarming," and Joe fits naturally into a romantic role. Goffe argued that the most engaging aspect is how the film draws on recognizable, real-life tensions within the group, using long-standing dynamics to create emotional stakes beneath the humor. She situated the movie within the band's broader nostalgia-driven career phase, suggesting it looks backward while still signaling that the Jonas Brothers "have still got juice in the tank" after two decades. Writing for Variety, Owen Gleiberman stated that the film is a knowingly lightweight and self-aware holiday musical, describing it as a "synthetic holiday trifle" and a "disposable stocking stuffer" even by streaming-era Christmas standards. He noted that the film casts the Jonas Brothers as exaggerated versions of themselves in a low-stakes, Planes, Trains and Automobiles-style premise about trying to reunite for Christmas. While he found much of the film to be conventional holiday fare, Gleiberman wrote that the musical numbers were generally pleasant and contributed to the film's appeal as a mild "guilty pleasure." He also singled out Nick Jonas as the "clear stand-out as an actor," praising his on-screen presence and suggesting he showed the most promise beyond the group's music career.

== Awards and nominations ==
Award	Date of ceremony	Category	Recipient(s)	Results	Ref.
Nickelodeon Kids' Choice Awards	November 14, 2026	Watch Party: Kids' Choice	A Very Jonas Christmas Movie	Nominated	
