= A Night with Nick =

2026 concert tour by Nick Jonas

- Tour by Nick Jonas
- Promotional poster
- Location: United States; Canada
- Associated album: Sunday Best
- Start date: June 4, 2026
- End date: June 13, 2026
- No. of shows: 6
- Supporting acts: Franklin Jonas & the Byzantines; Magnus Ferrell

Nick Jonas concert chronology
- Future Now Tour (2016); A Night with Nick (2026)

A Night with Nick was the fourth concert tour by the American singer-songwriter Nick Jonas, supporting his fifth studio album, Sunday Best (2026). The tour commenced on June 4, 2026, at Fallsview Casino Resort, in Niagara Falls, Ontario, and concluded on June 13, 2026, at Hard Rock in Atlantic City, New Jersey, consisting of six concerts.

== Background and announcement ==
On May 29, 2025, the Jonas Brothers confirmed the release of their seventh studio album Greetings from Your Hometown. It was released on August 8, 2025. The brothers then announced that they would embark on another concert tour, Jonas20: Greetings from Your Hometown Tour. The tour was created in celebration of the 20th anniversary of the Jonas Brothers. During the course of the tour, more dates were announced, including Nick Jonas' Sunday Best Brunch, an intimate performance hosted by Jonas and held on November 30, 2025, where his fifth solo album, Sunday Best, was announced. It took place at Nellie's Southern Kitchen in Las Vegas. During the event, the singer performed songs from the then-upcoming album. Sunday Best was released on February 6, 2026, through Republic Records.

On April 22, 2026, Jonas announced A Night with Nick, a series of intimate performances set to take place on the East Coast. The shows showcased songs from Sunday Best, as well as songs from previous records from Jonas' solo career. The first concert took place at the Fallsview Casino Resort, in Niagara Falls, Ontario, on June 4. The second was set for June 6, at the Hall at Live! in Hanover, Maryland. The third show was held in Charlotte, North Carolina at the Fillmore Charlotte, on June 7. Whilst the fourth one happened at the Tabernacle, in Atlanta on June 10. The fifth show was scheduled for June 11, at the Pantheon at Caesars Virginia, in Danville, Virginia. And the sixth and final concert was set to take place on June 13, in Atlantic City, New Jersey, at the Hard Rock. Franklin Jonas & the Byzantines and Magnus Ferrell served as opening acts for the tour.

== Tour dates ==
List of 2026 concerts
Date (2026)	City	Country	Venue	Supporting acts	Attendance	Revenue
June 4	Niagara Falls	Canada (Note: Promoted as New York in press material.)	Fallsview Casino Resort	Franklin Jonas & the Byzantines; Magnus Ferrell	—	—
June 6	Hanover	United States	The Hall at Live!	Franklin Jonas & the Byzantines; Magnus Ferrell	—	—
June 7	Charlotte	United States	The Fillmore Charlotte	Franklin Jonas & the Byzantines; Magnus Ferrell	—	—
June 10	Atlanta	United States	Tabernacle	Franklin Jonas & the Byzantines	—	—
June 11	Danville	United States	The Pantheon at Caesars Virginia	Franklin Jonas & the Byzantines	—	—
June 13	Atlantic City	United States	Hard Rock	Franklin Jonas & the Byzantines	—	—
