= Olympic Dreams Featuring Jonas Brothers =

2021 NBC television special

- Official release poster
- Written by: David Ferguson
- Starring: Kevin Jonas; Joe Jonas; Nick Jonas; Terry Crews; Rich Eisen
- Country of origin: United States
- Original language: English

Production
- Executive producer: Mike Yurchuk
- Running time: 60 minutes

Original release
- Network: NBC
- Release: July 21, 2021

Olympic Dreams Featuring Jonas Brothers is a 2021 television special starring American pop rock band Jonas Brothers. It was released globally on July 21, 2021, on NBC.

== Synopsis ==
The Jonas Brothers are pitched against one another, with help from Team USA's Olympic athletes to try and prove that they have what it takes to compete at an Olympic level.

== Cast ==
- Kevin Jonas
- Joe Jonas
- Nick Jonas
- Terry Crews
- Rich Eisen
- Laurie Hernandez
- Nastia Liukin
- Sydney McLaughlin
- Sanya Richards-Ross
- Gentel Sharrie
- Alise Willoughby

== Background ==
The special was first announced through an exclusive trailer for People, where Olympic athletes help the Jonas Brothers with training for the Olympic-level competitions.

== Production ==
During the filming for the special in May 2021, Nick fractured his ribs while biking for the BMX racing. After the incident, he told Entertainment Weekly that no major implications occurred and he would be back to his professional commitments shortly after that.

== Release ==
The sports special aired on NBC, on July 21, 2021, two days before the Opening Ceremony for the 2020 Summer Olympics. Olympic Dreams Featuring Jonas Brothers showcased the brothers competing in sports-themed challenges mentored by U.S. Olympic athletes such as Sydney McLaughlin-Levrone, Sanya Richards-Ross, and Alise Willoughby.

== Promotion ==
In celebration of both the NBC special and the 2020 Summer Olympics, the Jonas Brothers released the song "Remember This", which was set to be featured during NBC's U.S. Olympic trials coverage on June 18, 2021. Further promotion for the song tied into NBC's coverage of the 2020 Summer Olympics. The band released a special Olympics-themed version of "Remember This", which premiered during an NBC special on July 21, 2021.

Additionally, NBC's telecast of the closing ceremony featured a live performance of "Remember This" displaying highlights from the Games.
