= Joe Jonas =

American singer and actor (born 1989)

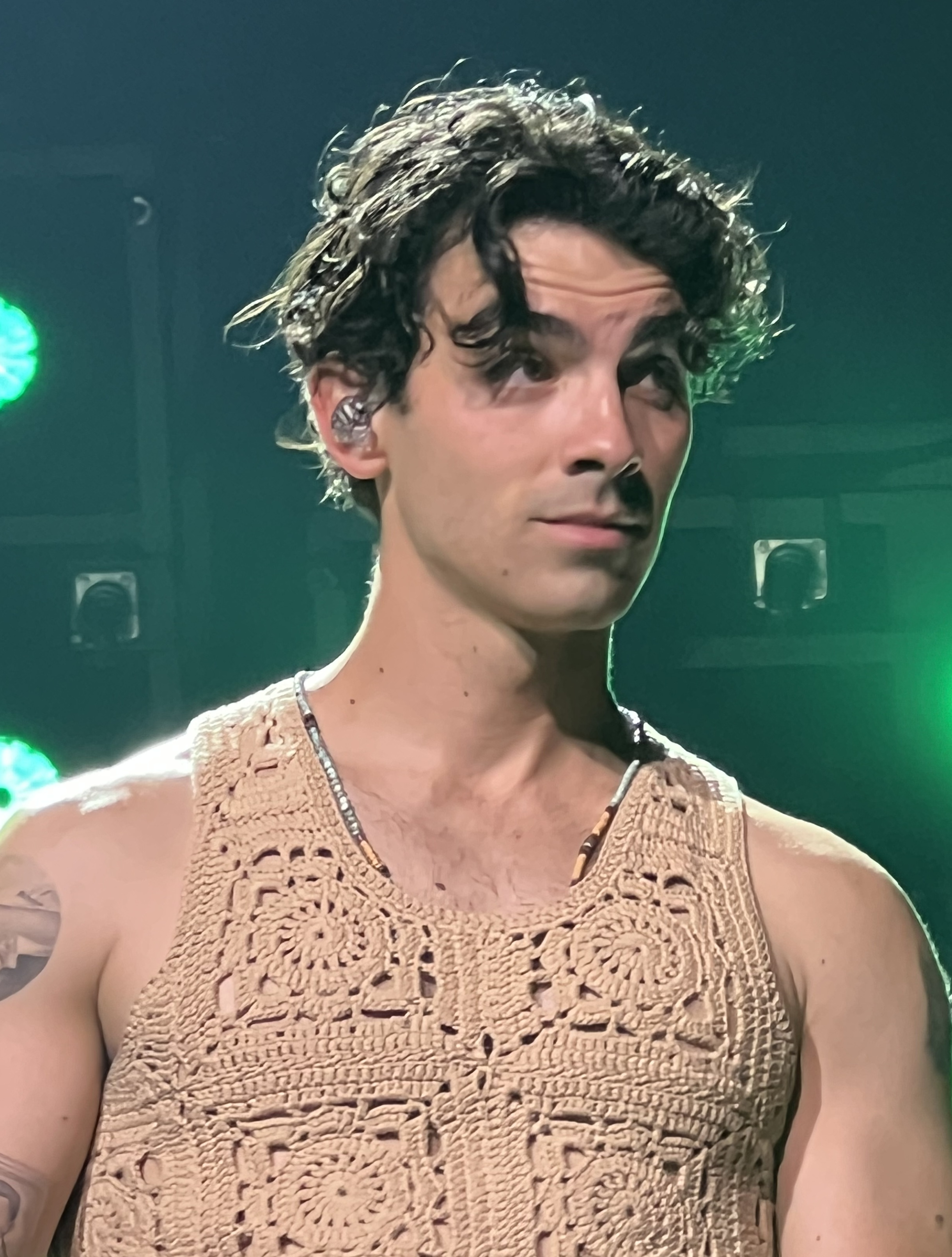
- Jonas in 2023
- Born: Joseph Adam Jonas; August 15, 1989 (age 37); Casa Grande, Arizona, U.S.
- Occupations: Singer; songwriter; musician; actor
- Years active: 2002–present
- Spouse: Sophie Turner (m. 2019; div. 2024)
- Children: 2
- Relatives: Kevin Jonas (brother); Nick Jonas (brother); Franklin Jonas (brother); Danielle Jonas (sister in-law); Priyanka Chopra (sister in-law)
- Musical career
- Genres: Pop; rock; R&B
- Instruments: Vocals; guitar; piano
- Labels: Hollywood; Republic
- Member of: Jonas Brothers; DNCE

Signature
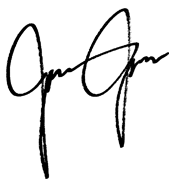

Joseph Adam Jonas (born August 15, 1989) is an American singer, songwriter, and actor. He rose to fame as a member of the pop rock band the Jonas Brothers, alongside his brothers Kevin and Nick. The group released their debut studio album It's About Time through Columbia Records in 2006. After signing with Hollywood Records, the group released their self-titled second studio album in 2007, which became their breakthrough record. The band became prominent figures on the Disney Channel during this time, gaining a large following through the network: they appeared in the widely successful musical television film Camp Rock (2008) and its sequel Camp Rock 2: The Final Jam (2010) as well as two of their own series, Jonas Brothers: Living the Dream (2008–2010) and Jonas (2009–2010).

The band's third studio album, A Little Bit Longer (2008), saw continued commercial success for the group; the album's lead single "Burnin' Up" hit the top five on the Billboard Hot 100 chart. Their fourth studio album, while still successful on the Billboard 200 chart, saw a decline in record sales. After the group confirmed a hiatus, Joe released his debut solo studio album, Fastlife (2011), which saw moderate commercial success. After the Jonas Brothers officially parted ways due to creative differences, Jonas formed the funk-pop band DNCE in 2015, serving as the lead vocalist. The group saw the significant commercial success of their debut single "Cake by the Ocean", which peaked at number 9 on the Billboard Hot 100 chart in the United States.

== Early life ==
Joseph Adam Jonas was born on August 15, 1989 in Casa Grande, Arizona, the son of Denise (née Miller) and Paul Kevin Jonas. His father is a songwriter, musician, and former ordained minister at an Assemblies of God church while his mother is a former sign language teacher and singer. He has an older brother, Kevin, and two younger brothers, Nick and Frankie.

He attended Eastern Christian High School in North Haledon, New Jersey.

In 2002, Joe appeared in Baz Luhrmann's Broadway production of La bohème.

== Career ==
=== 2005–2007: Breakthrough with Jonas Brothers ===
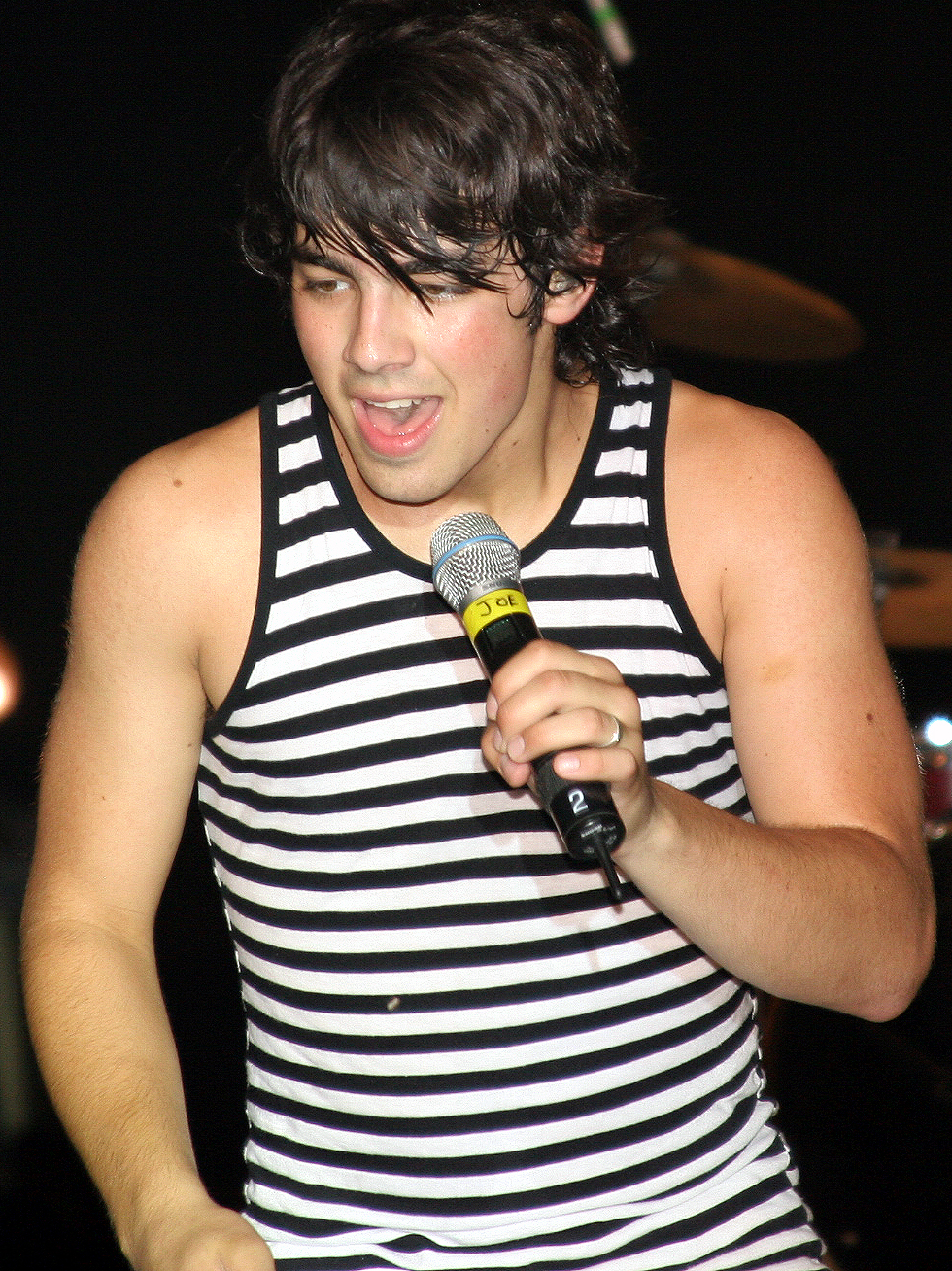
Joe performing in Bessemer with the Jonas Brothers, in 2007

In 2005, Joe, Kevin, and Nick recorded Please Be Mine, their first song recorded. Upon hearing the song, the Columbia Records president Steve Greenberg decided to sign the brothers as a group. They considered naming their group "Sons of Jonas" before settling on the name Jonas Brothers. While working on their debut studio album, the band toured throughout 2005 with artists such as Jump5, Kelly Clarkson, Jesse McCartney, the Backstreet Boys, and The Click Five among others. The group released their debut single, "Mandy", in December 2005. The album was initially scheduled for a February 2006 release date, though executive changes at Columbia's parent company Sony led to numerous delays on the project's release. During this time, the group began making appearances on various Disney Channel related soundtracks and toured with Aly & AJ throughout 2006. The band's debut album, It's About Time (2006), was released on August 8, 2006. The album received little backing from the label, who had no further interest in promoting the band. The album's second single, "Year 3000", had its music video premiere on the Disney Channel in the beginning of 2007. Dissatisfied with how the release of the record was handled, the band hoped to depart from Columbia Records and find a new label; it was later confirmed in 2007 that the group had been dropped by the label. The album went on to sell a total of 67,000 copies in the United States.

Only a short period of time after their departure from Columbia Records, it was confirmed that the group had signed a new contract with Hollywood Records. While working on their new album, the group continued to gain popularity due to soundtrack appearances and promotional appearances. The group released their self-titled second studio album through Hollywood Records on August 7, 2007. The album entered the top five of the Billboard 200 in the United States, going on to sell over two million copies in the country. Joe and his brothers made their acting debut on an August 17 episode of the Disney series Hannah Montana titled "Me and Mr. Jonas and Mr. Jonas and Mr. Jonas". The band performed the collaboration "We Got the Party" with lead actress Miley Cyrus, with the episode gaining over ten million viewers and became basic cable's most watched series telecast ever. The group's single "S.O.S" became their first top twenty hit on the Billboard Hot 100, and has sold over 1.5 million copies in the country, they put out Hold On, When You Look Me in the Eyes among singles.

=== 2008–2010: Acting ===
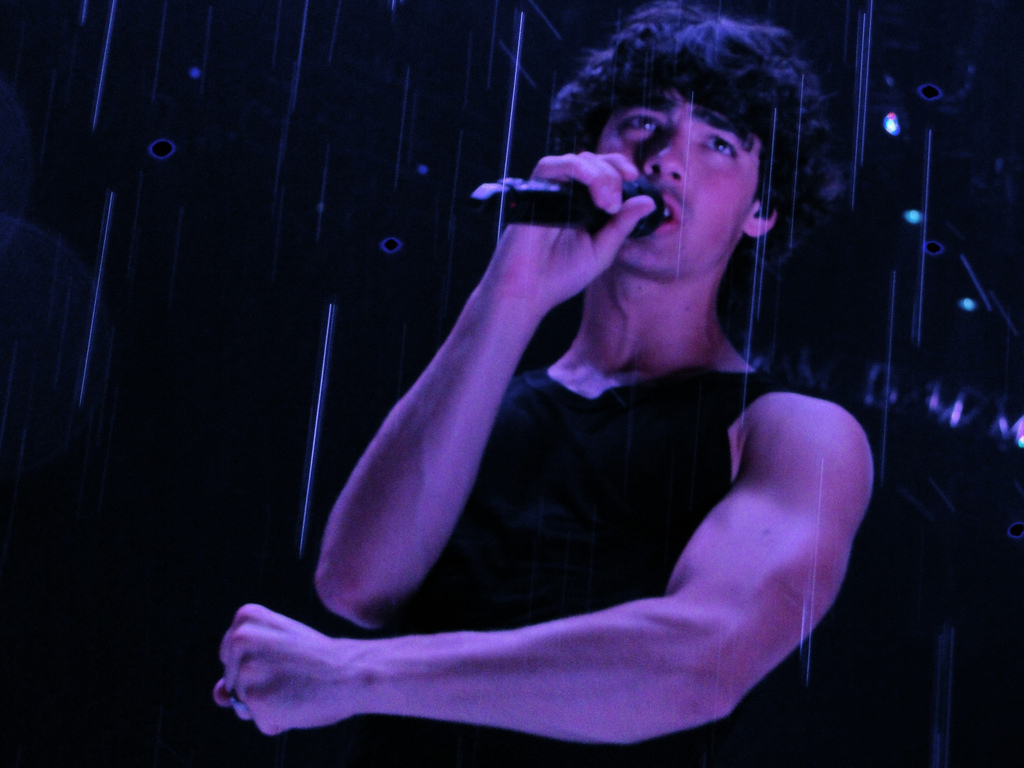
Joe Jonas on Jonas Brothers World Tour, in 2009

In May 2008, he and the band began starring in their own Documentary series Jonas Brothers: Living the Dream. Jonas made his film debut along with his brothers in the Disney Channel film Camp Rock (2008). The film's soundtrack was released on July 17, 2008, and sold 188,000 copies in its first week of release in the United States. Joe recorded the duet "This Is Me" for the project, with the song reaching the top ten of the Billboard Hot 100 chart. The song served as Jonas' first release outside of the Jonas Brothers. It has sold just over 900,000 copies in the United States. The Jonas Brothers' third studio album, A Little Bit Longer, was released in the United States on August 12, 2008. The album became their first to debut at number one on the Billboard 200 chart, selling over 525,000 copies in its first week of release. The album went on to sell over two million copies in the United States, making it their second multi-platinum album. The album was preceded by the release of the single "Burnin' Up" (2008), which became the band's first top five hit in the United States. Love Bug, Tonight were put out among singles. Joe and his brothers starred in the 3D biopic Jonas Brothers: The 3D Concert Experience, which received a theatrical release on February 27, 2009. The film was a financial success and is the sixth highest-grossing concert film.

Jonas starred with all three of his brothers in their second Disney Channel series, Jonas, which made its debut on May 2, 2009. The show's second and final season aired under the name Jonas L.A. The band released their fourth studio album, entitled Lines, Vines and Trying Times, on June 16, 2009. The project debuted at the top spot on the Billboard 200, boasting first week sales of 247,000 copies. Paranoid and Fly with Me were put out as singles. Joe was featured as a guest judge on a January 2010 episode of the ninth season of the singing competition American Idol. In February 2010, Jonas made a cameo appearance in Vampire Weekend's music video for "Giving Up the Gun" along with Jake Gyllenhaal, Lil Jon, and RZA. He later guest starred in a 2010 episode of Hot In Cleveland as Valerie Bertinelli's son, Will. Jonas starred in the sequel Camp Rock 2: The Final Jam.

=== 2011–2014: Fastlife and group disbandment ===
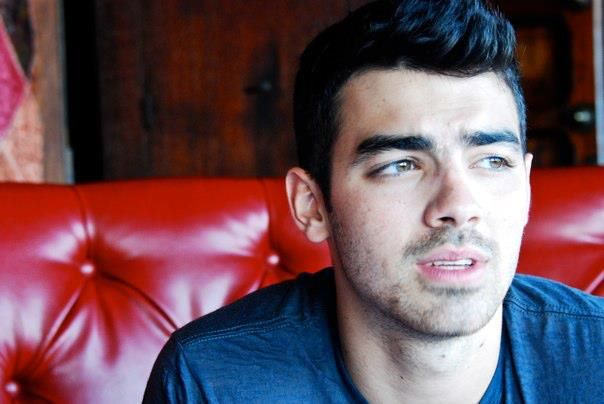
Jonas in an interview in 2011

In 2011, it was announced that Jonas was planning on recording a solo album. Jonas hoped to incorporate elements of funk into the album. Jonas released the album's lead single, titled "See No More", made in collaboration with Chris Brown on June 3, 2011. The single failed to have much commercial success, only reaching ninety-two on the Billboard Hot 100 chart. On August 4, 2011, Jonas announced via Twitter that he would join Britney Spears on her European tour starting October 16, 2011. Ryan Seacrest premiered the album's second single, "Just in Love", on September 9, 2011. The single was later remixed to include rapper Lil Wayne. Jonas later confirmed the album to be titled Fastlife. In support of the album, Joe co-headlined with Jay Sean in the Joe Jonas & Jay Sean Tour with JoJo as the opening act. The tour kicked off on September 9, 2011, and concluded on October 6, 2011. Fastlife was released through Hollywood Records on October 11, 2011. The album sold a total of 18,000 copies in its first week of release, debuting at number fifteen on the Billboard 200. The album quickly fell off of the albums chart, going on to sell a mere 45,000 copies by 2015. On May 1, 2012, it was announced that both the Jonas Brothers and Joe Jonas had parted ways with Hollywood Records.

It was confirmed in April 2013 that the Jonas Brothers would reunite to begin working on their fifth studio album and an upcoming tour. Kevin Jonas later starred in his own E! reality series, Married to Jonas, which focused on his marriage to new wife Danielle. The show featured appearances from Joe and Nick and documented the band's preparations for their musical comeback. That same year, Jonas participated in Fox's dating game show The Choice. Jonas began dating model Blanda Eggenschwiler in September 2012, with the two dating until July 2014. Jonas co-wrote the song "Dreams" for the John Legend album Love in the Future (2013). The brothers performed in Russia in September 2012, making it their first live performance since their 2010 tour. Their much-anticipated reunion concert, which had been announced in August 2012, took place on October 11, 2012, at Radio City Music Hall in New York City. The band's fifth studio album, set to be released independently through their own label, was slated for release in 2013. The Jonas Brothers also announced an upcoming North American tour, with tickets going on sale. The album, initially titled V, Live included the previously released singles, "Pom Poms" and "First Time". On October 9, 2013, the group cancelled their upcoming tour days before it was slated to start, citing a "deep rift within the band" over "creative differences". Only days later, it was confirmed that the band had officially ended.

=== 2015–2018: DNCE and The Voice Australia ===
With the band officially broken up, Jonas began working on a new musical project with producers such as Malay and Mattman & Robin. While working on the project, Jonas was unsure whether he wanted to record a second studio album or start a new band. Upon working with Justin Tranter on multiple songs, Jonas decided to form a band with his friends and former touring partners Jack Lawless and JinJoo Lee. Cole Whittle, a member of the alternative rock band Semi Precious Weapons, became the fourth and final member of the group. The group named themselves DNCE, a misspelling of the word dance. DNCE released their debut single, "Cake by the Ocean", in 2015. Their Swaay debut extended play was released in October 2015. Their self title DNCE album was later released. It debuted at number seventy-nine on the Billboard 200 chart in the United States but peaked at number nine.

In 2018, he joined the Australian version of The Voice as a coach replacing Seal, a year after being an advisor on the American version. In June 2018, Jonas and British DJ Jonas Blue released their collaborative track "I See Love", a song for the film Hotel Transylvania 3: Summer Vacation. He also voiced a Kraken in the movie.

=== 2019–2023: Jonas Brothers and DNCE reunions ===
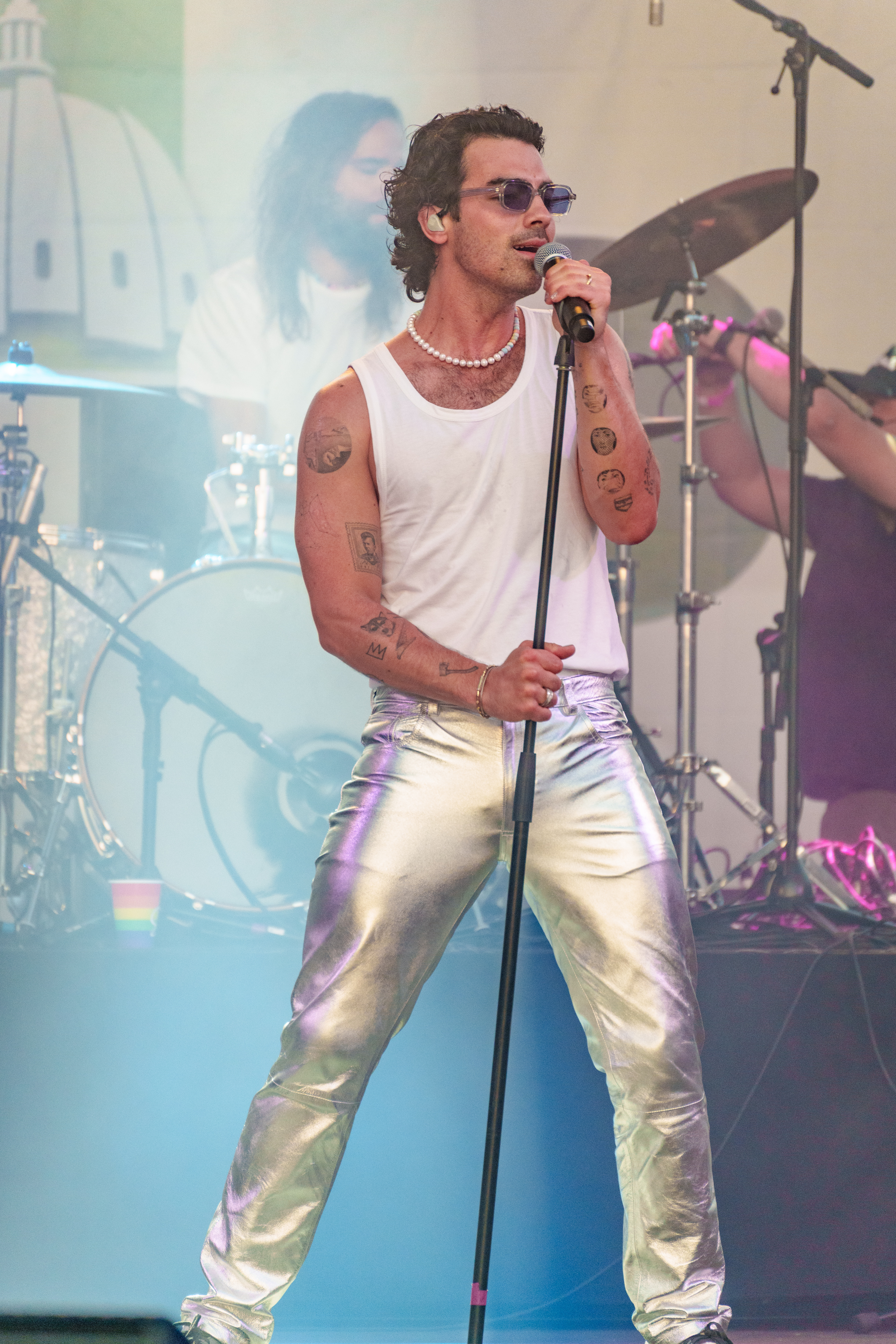
Jonas performing at Capital Pride in June 2022.

Starting in late January, rumors were swirling on Twitter and other social media that the three brothers were going to reform the Jonas Brothers. On February 28, 2019, the Jonas Brothers officially announced their return along with a new single, "Sucker", which released the next day, March 1. In April 2019, Joe Jonas appeared at WE Day California, portions of which were aired on ABC in August of the same year. He would eventually disclose that he experienced an isolated instance of fecal incontinence during a performance around this time, while wearing white clothing. Reflecting on the incident in 2023, he told KIIS-FM: "It wasn’t as big of a deal as I thought. But such is life. It has happened to many artists. I feel like I’ve paid my dues, and I feel like I’m a part of some secret club now."

In January 2021, it was announced that Jonas was among the cast of the Korean War movie Devotion. During March 2021, the filming took place on Tybee Island, Georgia. The movie, which is expected to premiere in 2022, also had filming on Arthur Ravenel Jr. Bridge in Charleston, South Carolina during May 2021. He has called his joining the cast of Devotion a "life changing" experience. In September 2022, it was announced that Jonas had co-authored a song titled "Not Alone" for the credits of the movie, calling the song "One of the favorites that I've ever written" and labeling the song as "spiritual".

In February 2022, Jonas announced the return of DNCE along with Lawless and Lee. Jonas announced the return of the band with a new song by Norwegian DJ Kygo, titled Dancing Feet, which was released on February 25, 2022.

The Jonas Brothers released their sixth studio album The Album in May 2023.

=== 2024–present: JONASCON 2025, Music for People Who Believe in Love, and The Voice ===
On July 17, 2024, Jonas announced the release of his second studio album, Music for People Who Believe in Love, which was initially set to be released on October 18, 2024, but was later postponed to May 23, 2025. The lead single from the album, "Work It Out", was released on July 19, 2024. The second single, "What This Could Be", was released on October 4. During JonasCon, a fan convention held by the Jonas Brothers to celebrate their 20th anniversary as a band, Jonas revealed the Music for People Who Believe in Love track list. "Heart by Heart" was released as the album's third single on April 25, 2025.

The Jonas Brothers also released a single together "Love Me to Heaven" on March 21, 2025, and performed on March 23, 2025 at JONASCON 2025 in New Jersey.

In April 2026, Jonas sang the national anthem at Wrestlemania 42. In August 2026, it was announced that Jonas will become a coach on the thirty-first season of The Voice, set to air in early 2027.

== Personal life ==
Jonas has dated Gigi Hadid, Taylor Swift and Demi Lovato. He began dating English actress Sophie Turner in 2016. The couple became engaged in October 2017, and married on May 1, 2019, in Las Vegas, Nevada. They held their second wedding ceremony in Paris, France on June 29, 2019. The couple have two daughters. In September 2021, Jonas and Turner purchased a mansion in Miami, Florida for $11 million. The mansion was reportedly inspired by architect Frank Lloyd Wright. Prior to moving to Miami, Jonas and Turner sold their house in Encino, a neighborhood of Los Angeles, for $15.2 million. In November 2022, the Jonases' Miami residence was listed for sale with an asking price of nearly $17 million.

In September 2023, Jonas filed for divorce from Turner in Miami, Florida. Turner subsequently sued Jonas and cited "wrongful detention," saying that Jonas refused to allow their daughters to return to England, which had been registered as their permanent residence in April. Jonas and Turner reached a temporary custody agreement in October. In January 2024, a New York judge dismissed the lawsuit with both Turner and Jonas agreeing, as the court considered that Jonas could not have given up the children's passports due to a ruling by a Florida court, where the divorce had been initiated. The divorce was finalized in September 2024. He was in a brief relationship with model Stormi Bree earlier that year.

In April 2026, Jonas announced that and Puerto Rican model Tatiana Gabriela were in a relationship, whom he had begun dating during the summer of 2025. The couple split up in November 2026.

== Discography ==
Solo albums

- Fastlife (2011)
- Music for People Who Believe in Love (2025)

with the Jonas Brothers

- It's About Time (2006)
- Jonas Brothers (2007)
- A Little Bit Longer (2008)
- Lines, Vines and Trying Times (2009)
- Happiness Begins (2019)
- The Album (2023)
- Greetings from Your Hometown (2025)

with DNCE

- DNCE (2016)

== Filmography ==
=== Film ===
Year	Title	Role	Notes	Ref.
2008	Hannah Montana and Miley Cyrus: Best of Both Worlds Concert	Himself	Concert film	
2009	Jonas Brothers: The 3D Concert Experience	Himself	Concert film	
2009	Night at the Museum: Battle of the Smithsonian	Cherub (voice)		
2016	Zoolander 2	Himself		
2017	Demi Lovato: Simply Complicated	Himself	Documentary film	
2018	Hotel Transylvania 3: Summer Vacation	Kraken (voice)		
2019	Chasing Happiness	Himself	Documentary film	
2020	Happiness Continues: A Jonas Brothers Concert Film	Himself	Concert film	
2022	Devotion	Marty Goode		
2025	A Very Jonas Christmas Movie	Himself	Also producer	
2025	A Very Jonas Christmas Movie Yule Log	Himself		

=== Television ===
Year	Title	Role	Notes	Ref.
2007	Hannah Montana	Himself	Episode: "Me and Mr. Jonas and Mr. Jonas and Mr. Jonas"	
2008	Camp Rock	Shane Gray	Television film	
2008	Disney Channel Games	Himself / Contestant	5 episodes; part of Green Team	
2008–10	Jonas Brothers: Living the Dream	Himself	Documentary series	
2008	Jonas Brothers: Live in London	Himself	Television documentary	
2008	Jonas Brothers: Band in a Bus	Himself	Television documentary	
2008	Jonas Brothers: Live & Mobile	Himself	Television documentary	
2009	Atrévete a soñar	Himself	Episode: "Promesa de amor"	
2009–10	Jonas	Joe Lucas	Lead role	
2010	Camp Rock 2: The Final Jam	Shane Gray	Television film	
2010–12	Hot in Cleveland	Will	2 episodes	
2010	American Idol	Guest judge	Season 9; 2 episodes	
2010	Sonny with a Chance	Himself	Episode: "A So Random Holiday Special"	
2012	The Choice	Himself	Episode 2	
2012–13	Married to Jonas	Himself	Recurring role	
2012	The Next: Fame Is at Your Doorstep	Judge / Mentor	Season 1	
2015	I Can Do That	Contestant	Season 1	
2016	Grease Live	Johnny Casino	Television special	
2016	Comedy Bang! Bang!	Himself	Episode: "Joe Jonas Wears a Maroon and Gold Letterman Jacket With White Sneakers"	
2017	Angie Tribeca	Detective Green	Episode: "Boyz II Dead"	
2017, 2020	The Voice	Mentor	Season 13 (Team Adam Levine) and season 18 (Team Nick)	
2018	The Voice Australia	Judge	Season 7	
2019	Songland	Himself	Episode: "Jonas Brothers"	
2020	Cup of Joe	Host	Quibi series	
2020	Home Movie: The Princess Bride	Princess Buttercup	"Chapter Six: The Fire Swamp"	
2020	Dash & Lily	Himself	Performed Like It's Christmas alongside Nick and Kevin Jonas	
2021	Olympic Dreams Featuring Jonas Brothers	Himself	NBC special	
2021	Jonas Brothers Family Roast	Himself	Netflix special	
2022	The Righteous Gemstones	Himself	Episode: "After I Leave, Savage Wolves Will Come"	
2022	Becoming a Popstar	Judge	Also executive producer	
2026	Camp Rock 3	Shane Gray	Television film	

=== Web ===
Year	Title	Role	Notes	Ref.
2009	KSM: Read Between the Lines	Himself	Episode: "Hangin' with the Jonas Brothers"	

=== Music videos ===
Year	Title	Artist	Notes	Ref.
2017	"Boys"	Charli XCX	Cameo	

=== Commercials ===
Campaigns /commercials
Year	Product(s)/Campaign(s)	Brand(s)	Role	Ref.
2022	"Make it T-Time" campaign	Tanqueray Gin		
2022	Don't mess with Texas® Campaign	Don't mess with Texas® - Official		

== Awards and nominations ==
Year	Award	Category	Nominee	Result	Ref.
2008	Los Premios MTV Latinoamérica	Fashionista Award ― Male	Himself	Won	
2009	Kids Choice Awards	Favorite TV Actor	Himself	Won	
2010	J-14's Teen Icon Awards	Icon Tweeter	Himself	Nominated	
2011	Kids Choice Awards	Favorite TV Actor	Himself	Nominated	
