= Danielle Jonas =

American television personality

- Born: Danielle Vivian Deleasa; September 18, 1986 (age 40); Denville, New Jersey, U.S.
- Other name: Dani
- Occupations: Television personality; businesswoman
- Years active: 2007–present
- Spouse: Kevin Jonas (m. 2009)
- Children: 2
- Relatives: Joe Jonas (brother-in-law); Nick Jonas (brother-in-law); Franklin Jonas (brother-in-law); Priyanka Chopra (sister-in-law)

Danielle Vivian Jonas (née Deleasa; born September 18, 1986) is an American reality television personality. From 2012 to 2013, she starred on Married to Jonas alongside her husband, musician and actor Kevin Jonas.

== Early and personal life ==
Danielle Vivian Deleasa was born on September 18, 1986, in Denville Township, New Jersey. She has two sisters and one younger brother. She is of Italian descent. She attended Morris Knolls High School. She worked as a hairdresser before meeting Kevin Jonas. She met him while both of their families were on vacation in the Bahamas in 2007. They were married on December 19, 2009, at Oheka Castle on Long Island. They have two daughters, Alena and Valentina.

In October 2025, she shared that she was diagnosed with lyme disease after she started noticing something was wrong when she began experiencing hair loss.

== Married to Jonas ==
Danielle starred in the reality television show Married to Jonas, which was about her marriage to Kevin Jonas, a member of the Jonas Brothers. The show debuted in 2012 and ran for two seasons. Danielle's main story line in the first season focused on her tumultuous relationship with her mother-in-law, Denise Jonas.

== Business ventures ==
In late 2013, Jonas and her husband partnered with Dreft to launch an app called Amazing Baby Days that allows couples to capture all of the moments from their pregnancy through the first year of a child's life. She live tweeted the birth of her first daughter as a part of the Dreft partnership.

Jonas founded a jewelry company called Danielle Jonas Co. and launched her first line of jewelry in December 2018 called Moments. The line is based around the concept of birthstones and many of the pieces are named after or inspired by her two daughters. She has said that she has plans to expand the company to include jewelry for children as well as silver pieces (as the collection is currently mostly gold based).

== Filmography ==
=== Film ===
Year	Film	Role	Notes
2025	A Very Jonas Christmas Movie	Herself	

=== Television ===
Year	Film	Role	Notes
2008	Jonas Brothers: Living the Dream	Herself (uncredited)	Season 1 Episode 10
2012	Chelsea Lately	Herself	
2012	E! Special: Kevin & Dani Jonas	Herself	TV documentary
2012	Big Morning Buzz Live	Herself	
2012–2013	Married to Jonas	Herself	TV series
2013	Teen Choice Awards 2013	Herself	Award Show
2012–2013	Rachael Ray	Herself	
2012–2015	Fashion News Live	Herself	Reoccurring guest Host
2015	Say Yes to the Dress: Designer Dreams	Herself	Season 13 Episode 10

=== Music videos ===
Year	Title	Artist(s)	Role	Ref.
2013	"First Time"	Jonas Brothers	Herself	
2019	"Sucker"	Jonas Brothers	Herself	
2020	"What a Man Gotta Do"	Jonas Brothers	Herself	

== Awards and nominations ==
Year	Title	Award	Nominated work	Result
2013	Teen Choice Awards	Choice Television: Reality Show	Married to Jonas	Nominated
2013	Teen Choice Awards	Choice Television: Female Reality Star	Danielle Jonas	Nominated
