= Kevin Jonas =

American musician (born 1987)

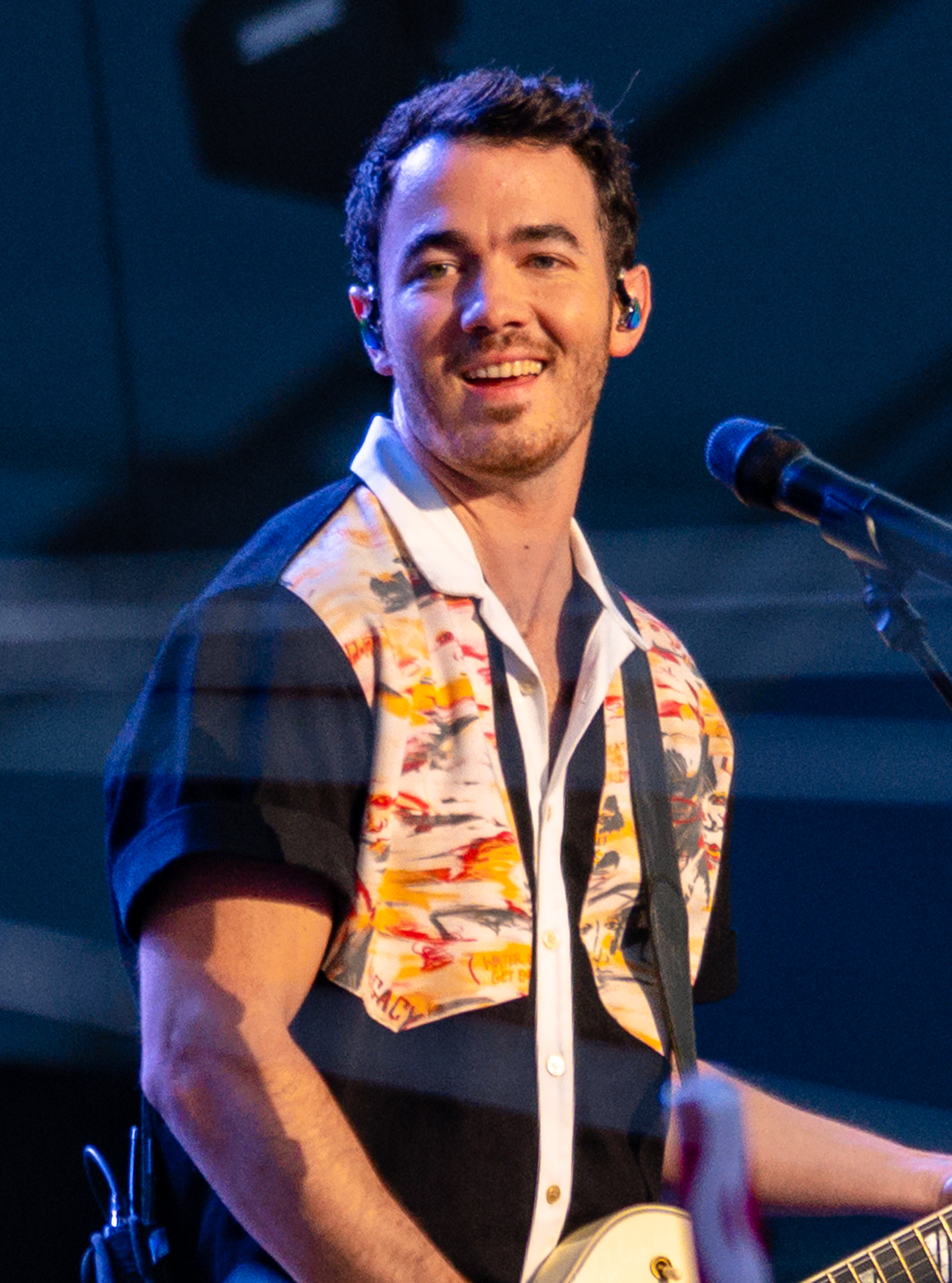
- Jonas in 2021
- Born: Paul Kevin Jonas Jr. November 5, 1987 (age 38); Teaneck, New Jersey, U.S.
- Occupations: Musician; singer; songwriter; actor
- Years active: 2000s–present
- Spouse: Danielle Deleasa (m. 2009)
- Children: 2
- Relatives: Joe Jonas (brother); Nick Jonas (brother); Franklin Jonas (brother)
- Musical career
- Origin: Wyckoff, New Jersey, U.S.
- Genres: Rock; pop rock; power pop; teen pop; funk rock
- Instruments: Guitar; vocals
- Label: Hollywood
- Member of: Jonas Brothers

Paul Kevin Jonas Jr. (born November 5, 1987) is an American musician, singer, songwriter and actor. He rose to fame as the lead guitarist of the pop rock band Jonas Brothers alongside his younger brothers, singer-songwriters Joe and Nick Jonas. The three brothers became prominent figures on the Disney Channel in the late 2000s, gaining a large following through the network: they appeared in the widely successful musical television film, Camp Rock (2008) and its sequel, Camp Rock 2: The Final Jam (2010) as well as two other series, Jonas Brothers: Living the Dream (2008–2010) and Jonas (2009–2010).

After the Jonas Brothers confirmed a hiatus in 2012, Kevin appeared on his own E! reality series that same year, Married to Jonas, with his wife, Danielle Jonas. Following the band's initial break-up in 2013, he appeared on the seventh season of The Celebrity Apprentice in 2014, founded the construction company Jonas Werner, and became the co-CEO of The Blu Market, an influencer marketing company. In February 2019, the Jonas Brothers reunited and would go on to release their fifth studio album, Happiness Begins, that summer. The band members appeared in two Amazon Prime Video documentaries named Jonas Brothers: Chasing Happiness and Happiness Continues in 2019 and 2020, respectively. Kevin appeared on People magazine's list of the Sexiest Men Alive in 2008 at the age of 21. He therefore was included as part of its 21 Club. Since 2025, Jonas has ventured into solo work, with his debut solo single, "Changing", being released in November 2025. His second solo single, "Little Things", was released in May 2026.

== Early life ==
Paul Kevin Jonas Jr. was born on November 5, 1987, in Teaneck, New Jersey, and grew up in Wyckoff. His mother, Denise Marie (née Miller), is a former sign language teacher and singer, and his father, Paul Kevin Jonas Sr., is a songwriter, musician, and former ordained minister at an Assemblies of God church. He has three younger brothers, Joe (b. 1989), Nick (b. 1992), and Franklin (b. 2000). As a child, Jonas appeared in several TV commercials as well as print ads. Unlike his brothers, he originally did not intend to become a musician but became interested one day after stumbling upon a book on playing guitar and playing his father’s guitar. He attended Eastern Christian High School in North Haledon, New Jersey.

== Career ==
=== 2005–2006: Career beginnings ===
In early 2005, Columbia Records' new president, Steve Greenberg, listened to Nick's record. While Greenberg did not like the album, he did like Nick's voice. After hearing the song "Please Be Mine", written and performed by all the brothers, Daylight/Columbia Records decided to sign the three as a group act. After being signed to Columbia, the brothers considered naming their group "Sons of Jonas" before settling on the name "Jonas Brothers". It's About Time, the brothers' first album, was released on August 8, 2006. According to the band's manager, it was only a "limited release" of a little over 50,000 copies. Because Sony was not interested in further promoting the band, the Jonas Brothers then considered switching labels. The band was ultimately dropped by Columbia Records in early 2007.

=== 2007–2012: Breakthrough with the Jonas Brothers ===
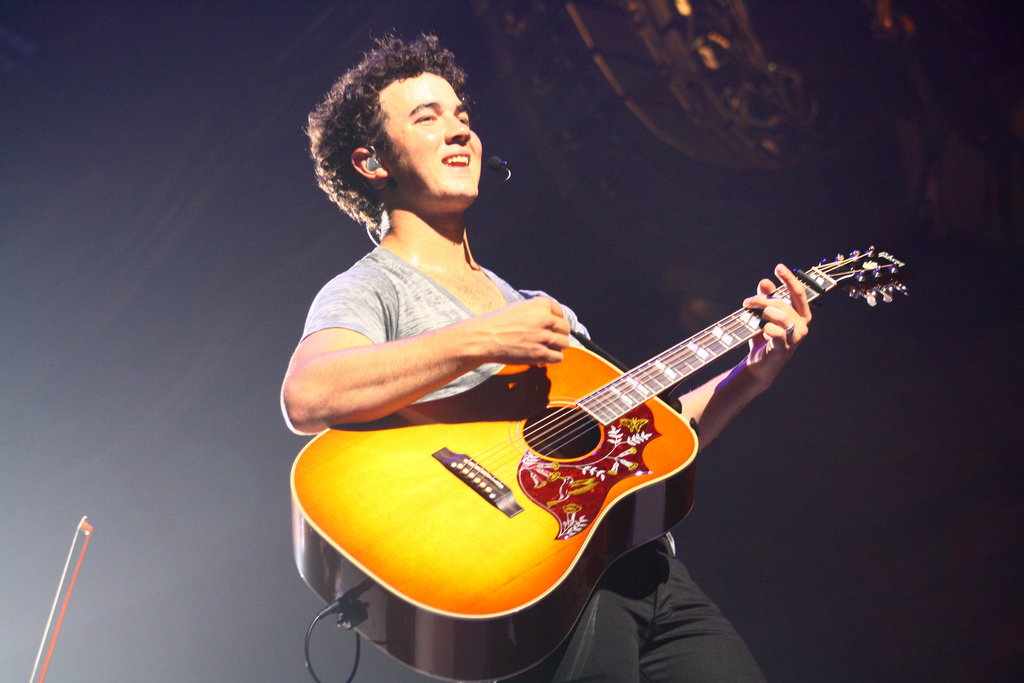
Jonas performing in 2009

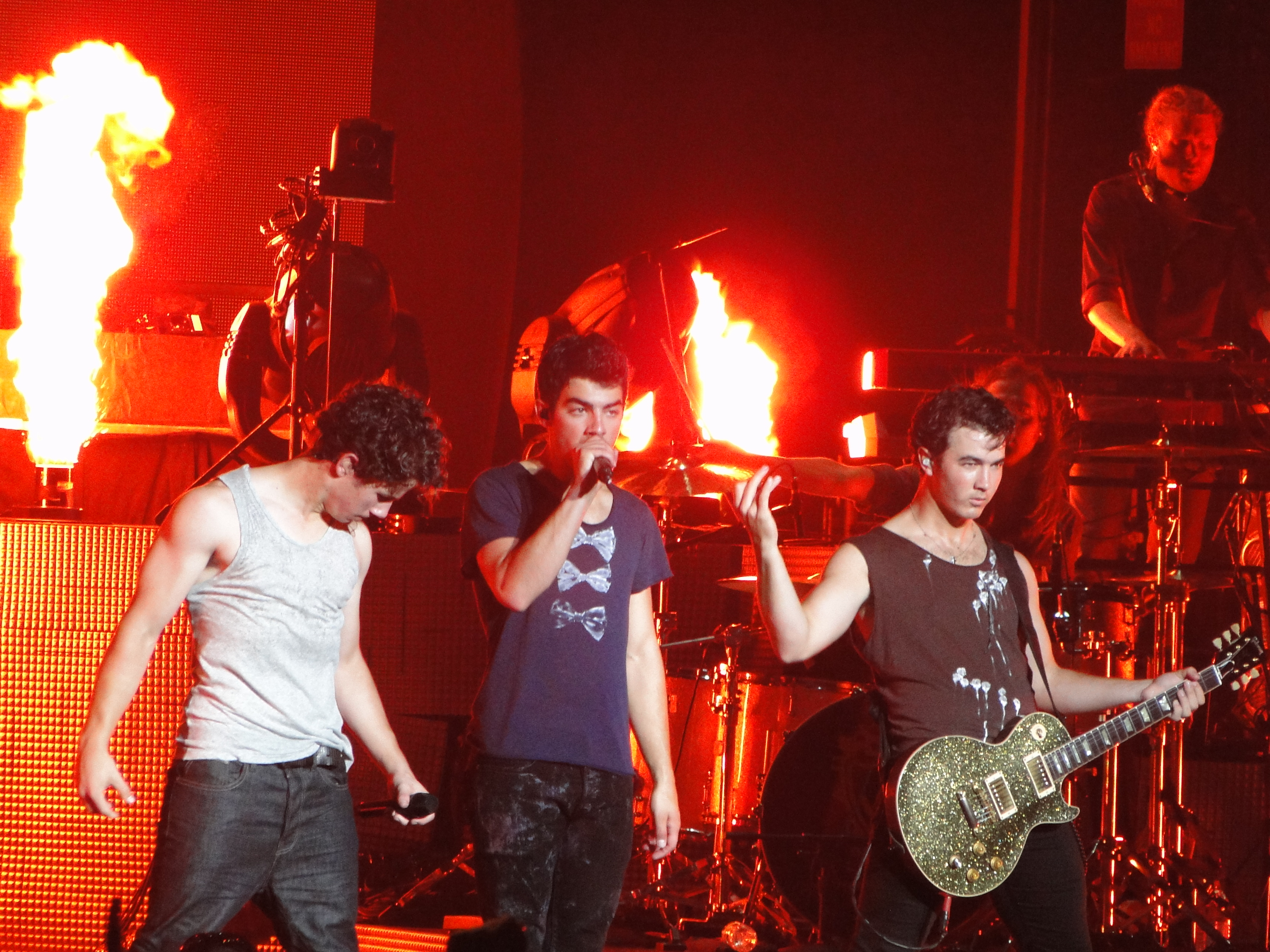
Jonas Brothers performing "Burnin' Up" in 2010

After shortly being without a label, the Jonas Brothers signed with Hollywood Records in February 2007. Around the same time, the brothers began appearing in Gap Inc. commercials for Baby Bottle Pop, singing the jingle. Their self-titled second album, Jonas Brothers, was released on August 7, 2007. It reached number five on the Billboard Hot 200 chart in its first week. Jonas and his brothers guest-starred in an episode of Hannah Montana, titled "Me and Mr. Jonas and Mr. Jonas and Mr. Jonas", which aired August 17, 2007 on Disney Channel. The episode debuted alongside the television film High School Musical 2 and a sneak peek of Phineas and Ferb. The episode broke basic cable records with a record 10.7 million viewers and became basic cable's most watched series telecast ever.

Jonas and his brothers also starred in the Disney Channel Original Movie Camp Rock, where they played a band called "Connect 3". Kevin played Jason, a guitarist; Nick played Nate, also a guitarist; and Joe played the lead male role and lead singer, Shane Gray. A soundtrack for the movie was released on June 17, 2008. The film premiered on June 20, 2008, on Disney Channel in the United States, on Disney Channel, and on Family in Canada. They returned in the sequel, Camp Rock 2: The Final Jam, which premiered on September 3, 2010. The Disney Channel reality short series, Jonas Brothers: Living the Dream, premiered on Disney Channel, May 16, 2008. The show, which ran until September 5, 2008, documented the brother's lives during the Look Me in the Eyes Tour. The name was inspired by their hit song When You Look Me in the Eyes. The series was renewed for a second season, which premiered March 21, 2010. The second season followed the band on the European leg of their World Tour 2009. The Jonas Brothers' third studio album, A Little Bit Longer, was released in the United States on August 12, 2008, and peaked at No. 1 on the Billboard 200.

Kevin, Joe, Nick, and Frankie starred in their own Disney Channel Original Series, Jonas, which premiered May 2, 2009. The show was renewed for a second season premiering June 20, 2010 as Jonas L.A. It centered on the brothers vacationing at their summer house in Los Angeles with Stella and Macy. On June 16, 2009, the brothers' fourth studio album, and third release under Hollywood Records, titled Lines, Vines, and Trying Times was released. The album peaked at number 1 on the Billboard 200 with 247,000 copies sold.

Jonas appeared on MTV's fourth episode of When I Was 17, talking about life as a teenager, regarding sports and his hairstyles. He guest hosted Live with Kelly, December 13, 2011, and did so a second time on July 4, 2012. It was announced on May 1, 2012, that the Jonas Brothers parted ways with their record label Hollywood Records, and bought the rights to their music.

=== 2013–2018: Jonas Brothers split ===
Kevin appeared in an E! reality series alongside his wife, Danielle, and his brothers, which premiered on August 19, 2012. Produced by Ryan Seacrest, Married to Jonas documented the young couple's domestic life as well as the brothers' recording efforts as they prepared to release their fifth studio album. The final episode of the second season aired on May 26, 2013. On October 29, 2013, The Jonas Brothers officially announced that the band was breaking up because of creative differences.

After parting ways with the Jonas Brothers in 2013, he founded the real estate development, construction company called JonasWerner, and is the co-CEO of The Blu Market company, which deals with communications and plans for social media influencers. Jonas was part of the seventh season of Celebrity Apprentice taping in spring 2014, which was filmed throughout New York City. He was fired in the second episode when his team lost the competition, during which time he'd been acting as the team leader. Kevin also made a cameo in a 2014 episode of The Real Housewives of New Jersey, working in his new role as contractor, leading the construction on Housewife Kathy Wakile's home.

In 2015, he created the food app Yood. As of 2016, he is also in partnership with the video-sharing app We Heart It.

=== 2019–present: Jonas Brothers reunion and Happiness Begins ===
On February 28, 2019, nearly six years after the Jonas Brothers' initial breakup, the brothers announced the band's reunion. They commenced their reunion the next day by releasing a new single, "Sucker" on March 1, 2019, and partaking in a week-long segment on The Late Late Show with James Corden. Jonas and his brothers appeared in the band's documentary Chasing Happiness, which was released on June 4, 2019. On May 9, 2019, a compilation album titled Music from Chasing Happiness was released. It consists of old Jonas Brothers songs, two Nick songs, one Joe song featuring a guest appearance from Lil Wayne, and a song from Joe's band DNCE. Directed by John Lloyd Taylor, the documentary covers the brothers' childhood, how they started as a band, why the band broke up, and how the band got back together.

They released their fifth studio album, Happiness Begins on June 7, 2019. It was the band's first album released after their reunion. They have released two songs with other artists: their feature on "Runaway" by Sebastián Yatra, Daddy Yankee, and Natti Natasha, as well as their collaboration on "Lonely" with Diplo. They released a song titled "Greenlight" for their episode of Songland the same day on June 18, three days before "Runaway". On November 8, they released a Christmas song, "Like It's Christmas". On January 17, 2020, they released the single "What a Man Gotta Do". Since July 11, 2022, Jonas has been co-hosting the reality competition series Claim to Fame on ABC alongside his brother, Franklin Jonas.

Jonas starred alongside his brothers in A Very Jonas Christmas Movie, which was released on Disney+ and Hulu on November 14, 2025, along with a soundtrack album. On November 20, 2025, Jonas released his debut solo single, "Changing", marking Jonas' official debut as a solo artist, after years of performing exclusively with siblings Joe and Nick. The song was written by Jason Evigan and produced by Mark Schick. On May 15, 2026, Jonas released his second single, "Little Things", which was written by Evigan, Sarah Hudson, James Abrahart, and Ferras.

== Personal life ==
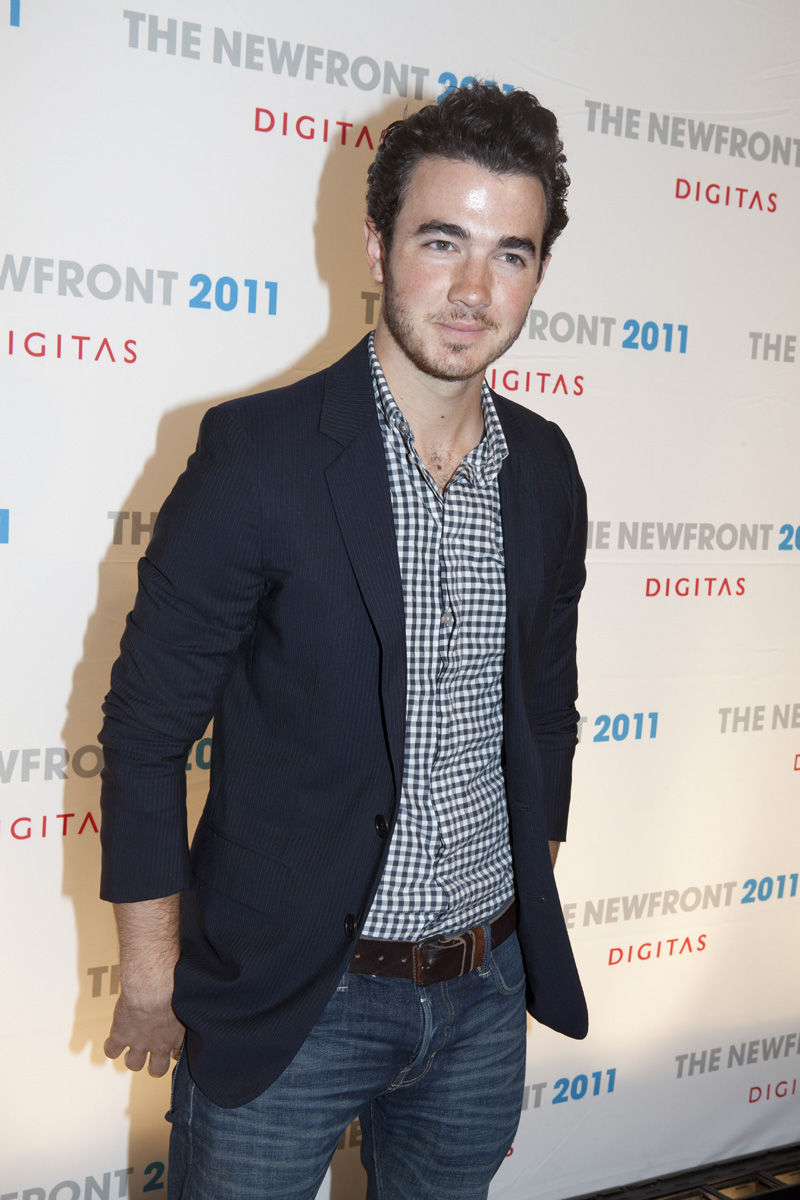
Jonas in 2011

Kevin Jonas lives in New Jersey with his wife, Danielle Jonas, and their two daughters, Alena and Valentina. Danielle is a former hairdresser with Ryan Rodgers Redken Ambassador, and the pair married at Oheka Castle on December 19, 2009, with his brothers Joe and Nick as his best men. The couple met while vacationing with their families in the Bahamas in May 2007. Their first daughter was born on February 2, 2014, and their second daughter was born on October 27, 2016.

During April 2021, Jonas showed support for the NGO GiveIndia during the worsening situation of the COVID-19 pandemic in India and urged fans to help donate to the organization to help. The following September, Jonas and his wife Danielle announced the release of a book for children titled There's a Rock Concert in My Bedroom, which chronicles the story of Emma, a girl who is excited about participating in her school's talent show. The Jonases said the initiative was motivated by their daughters. It was released in April 2022.

In June 2024, Jonas shared that he was diagnosed with skin cancer after discovering a malignant mole on his forehead. He had it removed and is currently cancer free.

== Discography ==
=== Singles ===
List of singles as lead artist, showing year released and album name
Title	Year	Peak chart positions				Album
Title	Year	US Adult	DOM Ang. Air.	PAN Ang. Air.	PRY Ang. Air.	Album
"Changing"	2025	40	18	9	15	Non-album singles
"Little Things"	2026	—	—	—	—	Non-album singles

== Filmography ==
=== Film ===
Year	Title	Role	Notes
2008	Hannah Montana and Miley Cyrus: Best of Both Worlds Concert	Himself	
2008	Camp Rock	Jason Gray	Television film
2009	Jonas Brothers: The 3D Concert Experience	Himself	
2009	Night at the Museum: Battle of the Smithsonian	Cherub (voice)	
2009	Beyond All Boundaries	Mike Mervosh (voice)	
2010	Camp Rock 2: The Final Jam	Jason Gray	Television film
2019	Chasing Happiness	Himself	Documentary
2020	Happiness Continues: A Jonas Brothers Concert Film	Himself	Documentary
2025	A Very Jonas Christmas Movie	Himself	
2025	A Very Jonas Christmas Movie Yule Log	Himself	
2026	Camp Rock 3	Jason Gray	Television film; also executive producer

=== Television ===
Year	Title	Role	Notes
2007	Hannah Montana	Himself	Episode: "Me and Mr. Jonas and Mr. Jonas and Mr. Jonas"
2008	Disney Channel Games	Contestant	
2008–2010	Jonas Brothers: Living the Dream	Himself	
2009–2010	Jonas	Kevin Percy Lucas	
2010	When I Was 17	Himself/Contestant	1 episode
2010	Minute to Win It	Himself/Contestant	
2012–2013	Married to Jonas	Himself/Contestant	
2014	The Real Housewives of New Jersey	Himself/Contestant	
2015	The Apprentice	Contestant	Season 14
2019	Songland	Himself	Episode: "Jonas Brothers"
2020	The Voice	Guest mentor	Season 18
2020	Dash & Lily	Himself	Episode: "New Year's Eve"
2021	Jonas Brothers Family Roast	Himself	Netflix special
2021	Olympic Dreams Featuring Jonas Brothers	Himself	Television special
2022–2024	Claim to Fame	Host	

=== Internet ===
Year	Title	Role	Notes	Ref.
2009	KSM's Read Between the Lines	Himself	Episode: "Hangin' with the Jonas Brothers"	

=== Video games ===
Year	Title	Voice role	Notes	Ref.
2009	Night at the Museum: Battle of the Smithsonian	Cherub		
