= Nick Jonas =

American musician and actor (born 1992)

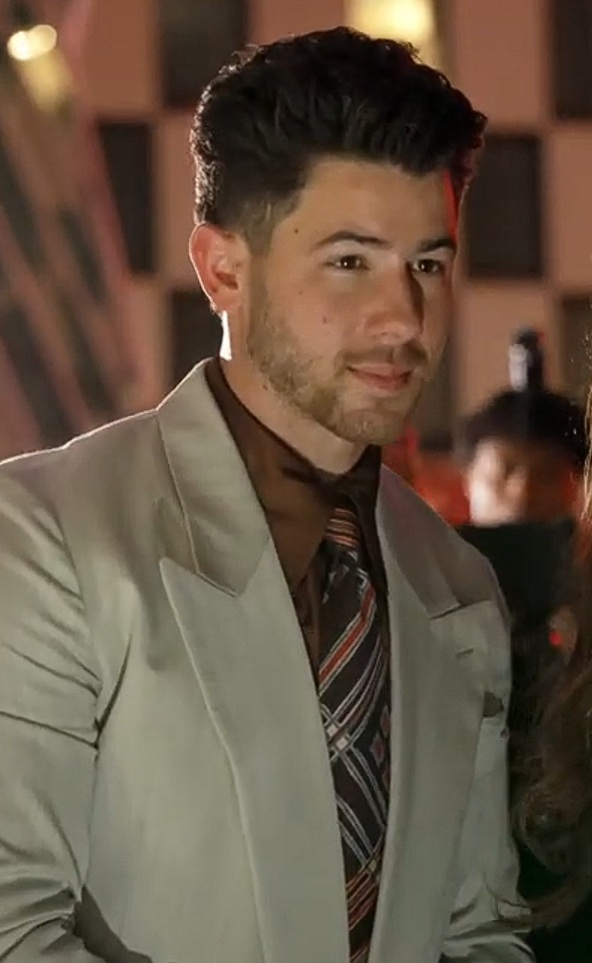
- Jonas in 2026
- Born: Nicholas Jerry Jonas; September 16, 1992 (age 34); Dallas, Texas, U.S.
- Occupations: Singer; songwriter; musician; actor
- Years active: 1999–present
- Spouse: Priyanka Chopra (m. 2018)
- Children: 1
- Relatives: Kevin Jonas (brother); Joe Jonas (brother); Franklin Jonas (brother); Danielle Jonas (sister in-law)
- Musical career
- Genres: Pop; rock; R&B
- Instruments: Vocals; guitar; keyboards; drums
- Labels: INO; Daylight; Columbia; Hollywood; Island; Republic
- Member of: Jonas Brothers; Nick Jonas & the Administration
- Website: nickjonas.com

Signature
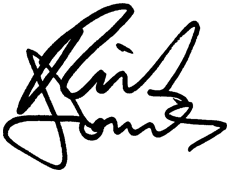

Nicholas Jerry Jonas (born September 16, 1992) is an American singer, songwriter, musician and actor. He rose to fame as a member of the pop rock band Jonas Brothers, alongside his brothers Joe and Kevin. The group released multiple albums together, and became prominent figures on Disney Channel starring in the successful musical television film Camp Rock (2008) and its sequel Camp Rock 2: The Final Jam (2010), before appearing in their own series, Jonas Brothers: Living the Dream (2008–2010) and Jonas (2009–2010).

Following a hiatus from the band, Jonas formed another band, Nick Jonas & the Administration in 2010, and released one album. By 2013, Jonas had signed with Island Records and released a self-titled album in 2014, which saw the success of the single "Jealous" which peaked at number seven on the US Billboard Hot 100. He followed this with his third studio album Last Year Was Complicated (2016) peaked at number two on the US Billboard 200. In 2019, the Jonas Brothers reunited and have released various albums in the years following. Jonas' next solo album, Spaceman (2021), saw some success, before he signed with Republic Records and released Sunday Best (2026).

Outside of music, Jonas has since appeared in multiple films including Jumanji: Welcome to the Jungle (2017), Jumanji: The Next Level (2019), Chaos Walking (2021) and Power Ballad (2026). He has starred in various non-Disney television shows including Kingdom (2014–2017) and Scream Queens (2015). He has since appeared in a number of theatre productions on Broadway.

== Life and career ==
=== 1992–2006: Childhood and career beginnings ===
Jonas was born in Dallas, Texas, the third son of Denise (née Miller) and Paul Kevin Jonas. Jonas' father is a songwriter, musician, and former ordained minister at an Assemblies of God church, while his mother is a former sign language teacher and singer. Nick has a younger brother, Frankie, and two older brothers, Joe and Kevin. Jonas was raised in Wyckoff, New Jersey and homeschooled by his mother. Jonas' career started when he was discovered at the age of six in a barber shop, where his mother was getting her hair cut, and was referred to a professional show business manager. He began performing on Broadway at the age of seven, portraying characters such as Tiny Tim, Chip Potts, Little Jake, and Gavroche among other roles. Jonas wrote a song titled "Joy to the World (A Christmas Prayer)" with his father while performing in Beauty and the Beast (2002), featuring background vocals from Jonas' fellow cast members, which was featured on the compilation album Broadway's Greatest Gifts: Carols for a Cure, Vol. 4. The song was later released through INO Records to Christian Radio in 2003, serving as Jonas' debut single.

The single caught the attention of Columbia Records, leading to Jonas signing with Columbia and INO to release his debut studio effort. "Dear God" (2004) was released as the lead single from the project, followed by a re-recorded version of "Joy to the World (A Christmas Prayer)". Jonas co-wrote songs for the album with his two older brothers, who also provided background vocals for the release. Nicholas Jonas (2004) received a limited release on September 5, 2004. The project was scheduled for a wide release in December, but was pushed back before ultimately being cancelled altogether. The new president of Columbia Records, Steve Greenberg, liked Jonas' voice on the record, but did not like the album. Upon hearing the song "Please Be Mine", he decided to sign Jonas and his brothers as a group. After being signed to Columbia, the brothers considered naming their group Sons of Jonas before settling on the name Jonas Brothers. In 2005, Jonas was diagnosed with type 1 diabetes at the age of 13.

While working on their debut studio album, the band toured throughout 2005 with artists such as Jump5, Kelly Clarkson, Jesse McCartney, the Backstreet Boys, and The Click Five, among others. The band's debut single, "Mandy", was released in December 2005. The album was initially scheduled for a February 2006 release date, but executive changes at Columbia's parent company Sony led to numerous delays on the project's release. It was during this time that the group began making appearances on various Disney Channel-related soundtracks, and toured with Aly & AJ throughout 2006. The band's debut album, It's About Time (2006), was released on August 8, 2006. The album received little backing from the label, who had no further interest in promoting the band. During its initial run, the album only received a limited release of 50,000 copies. Unhappy with how the release of the record was handled, the band hoped to depart from Columbia Records and find a new label; it was later confirmed in 2007 that the group had been dropped by the label. The album went on to sell a total of 1,750,000 copies.

=== 2007–2011: Breakthrough with Jonas Brothers and other projects ===
Shortly following their departure from Columbia Records, it was confirmed that the Jonas Brothers had signed with Hollywood Records. While working on their new album, the group continued to gain popularity from soundtrack appearances and promotional appearances. The group released their self-titled second studio album through Hollywood Records on August 7, 2007. The album entered the top five of the Billboard 200 in the United States, going on to sell over two million copies in the country. The group's single "S.O.S" became their first top twenty hit on the Billboard Hot 100, and has sold over 1.5 million copies in the country. Nick and his brothers made their acting debut on an August 17 episode of the Disney series Hannah Montana titled "Me and Mr. Jonas and Mr. Jonas and Mr. Jonas". The band performed the collaboration "We Got the Party" with lead actress Miley Cyrus, with the episode garnering over ten million viewers and becoming basic cable's most watched series telecast ever. In May 2008, he and the band began starring in their own Disney series Jonas Brothers: Living the Dream.

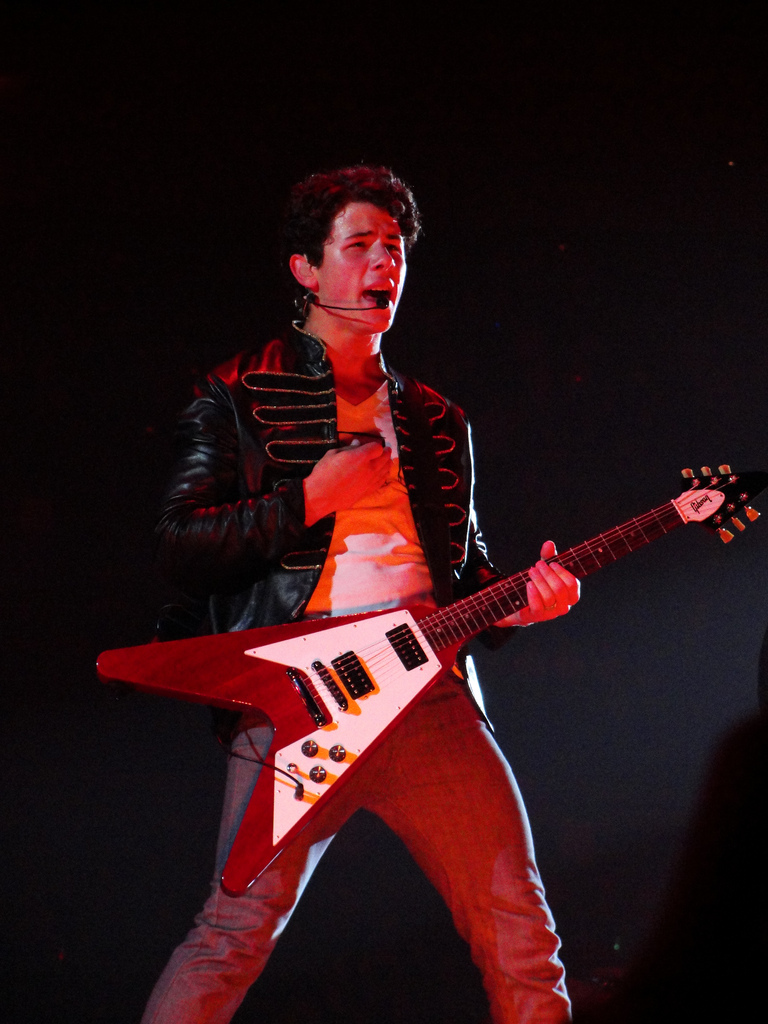
Jonas performing in July 2009

Jonas made his film debut along with his brothers in the Disney Channel film Camp Rock (2008), starring alongside Demi Lovato. The film's soundtrack was released on June 17, 2008, and sold 188,000 copies in its first week of release in the United States. The movie went on to become a major hit for the network, receiving 8.86 million viewers. The band achieved further success with their third studio album, A Little Bit Longer (2008), which became their first to debut at number one on the Billboard 200 chart; the project sold over 525,000 in its first week of release. The album went on to sell over two million copies in the United States, making it their second multi-platinum album. A Little Bit Longer remains the band's highest-selling effort to date. "Burnin' Up" (2008) served as the album's lead single, becoming the band's first top five hit in the United States.

The band starred in the 3D biopic Jonas Brothers: The 3D Concert Experience, which received a theatrical release on February 27, 2009. The film was a financial success, and is the sixth highest-grossing concert film. Jonas starred with all three of his brothers in their second Disney Channel series, Jonas, which made its debut on May 2, 2009. The band released their fourth studio album, titled Lines, Vines and Trying Times, on June 16, 2009. The project debuted at the top spot on the Billboard 200, boasting first week sales of 247,000 copies.

Following the release of their fourth studio album, the Jonas Brothers confirmed that they would be taking a hiatus to focus on solo projects. While Joe chose to record a solo record, Nick opted to form the band Nick Jonas & the Administration, signing with Hollywood Records to release the project and later doing a tour. On June 21, Jonas made his West End debut performing in Les Misérables for the second time, this time in the role of Marius Pontmercy. Jonas was originally supposed to play the role for only three weeks, but was able to extend his run until July 24, 2010, because of changes in the Jonas Brothers touring schedule. He also appeared in the 25th Anniversary Concert at The O2 Arena on October 3, 2010, again playing the role of Marius Pontmercy. He starred in How to Succeed in Business Without Really Trying on Broadway. From August 5–7, Jonas performed in the musical Hairspray as Link Larkin at the Hollywood Bowl. He also starred in the sequel Camp Rock 2: The Final Jam (2010), which was a commercial success. Jonas later appeared in the 2011 series Mr. Sunshine; he played Eli Cutler, an up-and-coming singer who wants everything his way before he performs at the Sunshine Center. He also played the role of Ryan on an episode of the sitcom Last Man Standing.

=== 2012–2013: Jonas Brothers split ===
Jonas guest-starred on an episode of Smash as Lyle West, a young musician and television star backing a promising Broadway musical; Jonas would later reprise the role in the show's season finale on May 14. Jonas had a cameo appearance in the last episode of the second season of the comedy web series Submissions Only. Jonas was to perform in the musical How to Succeed in Business Without Really Trying as J. Pierrepont Finch from January 24 to July 1, 2012. Despite this, the musical ended its run on May 20. Jonas recorded five songs for the project, which were released as an extended play in 2012. The Jonas Brothers confirmed in March that work had begun on their fifth studio album. The band officially parted ways with Hollywood Records in May 2012; they purchased the rights to all of their music from the label. Despite claims that Jonas would be signing on as a judge for the twelfth season of the singing competition American Idol, Jonas opted to appear instead as a mentor with Demi Lovato on The X Factor. Jonas made guest appearances on the television series Married to Jonas, starring his older brother Kevin and his wife. The television show also documented their return to music and the process of working on their fifth album.

The Jonas Brothers released a new single, "Pom Poms" (2013), on April 2 through their own record label. The music video for the song was filmed in February 2013 in New Orleans, Louisiana and premiered on E! on April 2, 2013. Nick was the co-host of the Miss USA 2013 competition on NBC; Jonas and his brothers performed during the event. The band released "First Time" as the second single from their forthcoming album. The band cancelled their highly anticipated tour in October only days before it was set to begin, citing a "deep rift within the band" over "creative differences", leading to speculation that the brothers would be parting ways musically. They officially confirmed on October 29 that the band had split up for good. The split led to the cancellation of their comeback album, though Nick confirmed that some of the songs recorded for the project would become available for fans through an upcoming release; the band released a live album featuring five songs from their unreleased fifth studio album. Around this time, Jonas guest starred as a computer hacker on an episode of Hawaii Five-0.

=== 2014–2018: Nick Jonas and Last Year Was Complicated ===
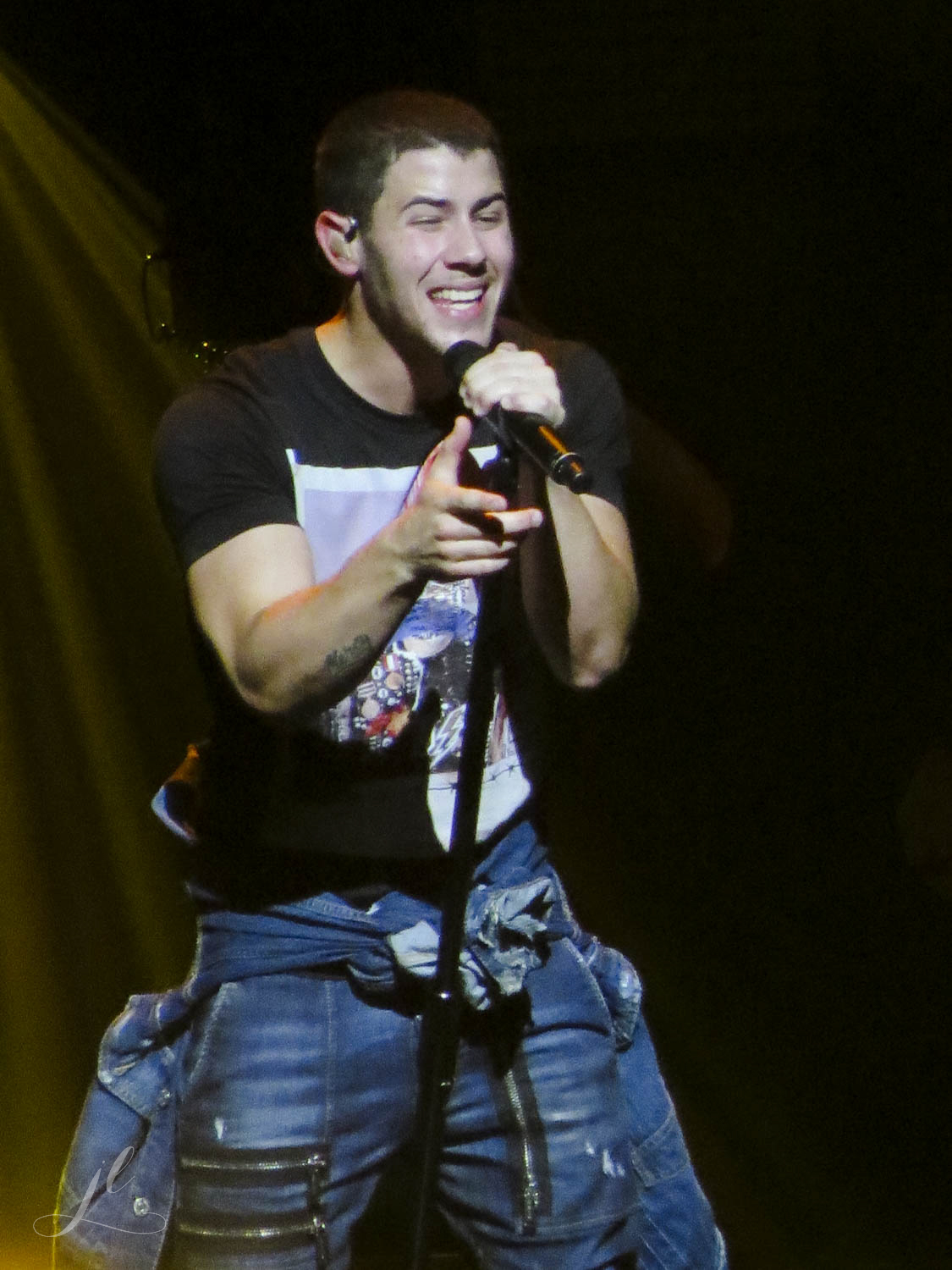
Jonas performing in Denver, Colorado (2016)

With the Jonas Brothers officially broken up, Jonas began working on material for his second studio album. In 2014, he worked as the musical and creative director on Demi Lovato's Neon Lights Tour, overseeing video content, wardrobe, lighting and staging, and song arrangement. He joined Lovato on stage for select shows of the concert, performing three of her songs with her. Jonas went on to appear in two more episodes of Hawaii Five-O, and was cast in a starring role as Nate Kulina in the drama series Kingdom. The series premiered on DirecTV's Audience Network, and was renewed for two more seasons only two weeks later. Jonas made his return to music with the release of "Chains", the lead single to his second studio album. "Jealous" was later released as the album's second single, going on to become Jonas' first top ten hit as a solo artist on the Billboard Hot 100.

Jonas released his second studio album, Nick Jonas, through Island Records on November 10, 2014. The album debuted at number six on the Billboard 200, selling over 37,000 copies in its first week of release. Following the success of "Jealous" and the album, "Chains" was re-released as the next single from the album. The single achieved commercial success, reaching the top twenty of the Billboard Hot 100 and becoming his second multi-platinum single. Jonas served as a guest mentor for Christina Aguilera on the eighth season of The Voice. He also starred in the film Careful What You Wish For, which was filmed in 2013. In 2015, Jonas released a new single, "Levels", as the lead single to the re-released version of his debut album, Nick Jonas X2. Jonas had a recurring role as Boone Clemens in the comedy horror series Scream Queens; he is credited for five episodes of the first season.

Work on Jonas' third studio album began as early as 2014, prior to the release of Nick Jonas. The album was initially set to be titled Unhinged, but was changed to Last Year Was Complicated prior to its release. "Close", a collaboration with Tove Lo, was released as the album's lead single. The project was a commercial success, reaching the top twenty of the Billboard Hot 100 and becoming his third top ten hit on the Mainstream Top 40 chart. Last Year Was Complicated was released on June 10 to a generally positive reception. The album sold a total of 66,000 equivalent album units in its first week of release, entering the Billboard 200 chart at number two. This marks his highest peaking effort as a solo artist to date. "Bacon" has been serviced as the second single from the album. Jonas's contributions as a songwriter led to him receiving the Hal David Starlight Award in the Songwriters Hall of Fame. Jonas embarked on the co-headlining Future Now Tour (2016) alongside Demi Lovato on June 29, and continued on the tour until the final concert on September 17. In May 2015, Billboard revealed that Jonas was in the process of starting an "artist-centric" new record label, Safehouse Records, of which he would be co-founder and co-owner. The label would be a partnership between Jonas, Demi Lovato, and Lovato then-manager Phil McIntyre, and will form part of a new collaborative arrangement with record label Island. Jonas also starred in the drama film Goat alongside James Franco, which was released on September 23, 2016. He participated in a rap battle with Kevin Hart on October 27.

On May 26, 2017, Jonas released the single "Remember I Told You" which features British singer-songwriter Anne-Marie and American singer and producer Mike Posner. Jonas released the song "Find You" on September 14, 2017. Jonas contributed to the Ferdinand soundtrack with the songs "Home" and "Watch Me", released on October 20. "Home" was nominated for the Golden Globe Award for Best Original Song. In May 2018, Jonas released the single "Anywhere", a collaboration with DJ/Producer Mustard. Jonas and Mustard performed the song live, along with "Jealous", with contestant Jurnee during the finale of American Idol season 16 on May 21. They also performed the song during the 2018 MTV Movie & TV Awards on June 18. In an August 2018 interview with Teen Vogue, Jonas announced the impending release of a collaboration with Robin Schulz titled "Right Now", which he co-wrote with Skylar Grey. In August 2018, it was announced that Jonas had joined the cast of the animated film UglyDolls alongside Kelly Clarkson and Pitbull, which was released on May 3, 2019. Jonas also performs the song "The Ugly Truth" for the film, which appears on the soundtrack album.

=== 2019–2025: Jonas Brothers reunion, The Voice and Spaceman ===
Starting in late January, rumors were swirling online that the three brothers were going to reform the Jonas Brothers. On February 28, 2019, the Jonas Brothers officially announced their return along with a new single, "Sucker", which released the next day, March 1. The group's fifth album, Happiness Begins was released on June 7. In October 2019, it was announced that Jonas would join The Voice as a coach for its eighteenth season and later for its twentieth season. Jonas had a role in Roland Emmerich's World War II blockbuster movie Midway, which was released on November 8, 2019.

On February 20, 2021, it was announced that Jonas would host Saturday Night Live for the first time on February 27. He was SNL's musical guest for the fourth time, performing his single, "Spaceman", from his fourth studio album, also titled Spaceman. The second single, titled "This Is Heaven", was released on March 4, 2021.

On March 15, 2021, Jonas and his wife Priyanka Chopra announced the nominees for the 93rd Academy Awards. On April 30, 2021, it was announced that Jonas would host the 2021 Billboard Music Awards. Nick Jonas is set to star as Frankie Valli in a proshot taping of the musical Jersey Boys.

In March 2023, Jonas and King released a single in Hindi and English, titled "Maan Meri Jaan (Afterlife)".

=== 2026: Sunday Best ===
On November 30, 2025, Jonas announced his upcoming fifth studio album, Sunday Best. "Gut Punch" was released as the album's first single on January 1, 2026.

== Other ventures ==
Outside of his acting and music career, Jonas ventured in various directions. In 2014, he signed a contract with modeling agency Wilhelmina Models. In 2017, he released his shoe collection 1410, a collaboration with versatile sneaker company Creative Recreation. In 2018, he released a spring clothing line with John Varvatos, labeled JV x NJ. Later in the year, they also released a fragrance, also labeled JV x NJ. In 2019, they released two more fragrances: JVXNJ Red and JVxNJ Silver.

In July 2022, Jonas and Chopra announced an investment in Perfect Moment, a 1979-founded company dedicated mainly to womenswear. The company said that the couple will play a "substantial role" in the marketplaces of Asia and the Middle East. In October 2022 it was annmounced that Nick collaborated with PGX on a capsule collection for the golfsport. The PXG x NJ collection includes apparel and accessories, from hats and bags to shirts, pants, socks.

In September 2019, Jonas announced that he had collaborated with John Varvatos and the spirits giant Stoli Group on an ultra-premium tequila named Villa One. The tequila, which was rolled out in the U.S. in September, came in Silver, Reposado and Añejo expressions. At the end of 2020, the tequila was made available for purchase in the United Kingdom. In May 2021, it was made available in Canada. On September 29, 2021, it was announced that Nick Jonas and Priyanka Chopra Jonas had joined the producing team of Douglas Lyons' Broadway comedy Chicken & Biscuits, currently in previews at Circle in the Square Theatre.

=== Image 32 ===
Jonas was an executive producer for the show Dash & Lily, with Stranger Things producer Shawn Levy. Levy produced the series with Josh Barry via his 21 Laps banner. The series was released on November 10, 2020, on Netflix. Jonas was involved on casting, filming, and music. He also made a cameo in the series, giving love advice and performing the single "Like It's Christmas" with his brothers. In 2020, Amazon Studios greenlit an unscripted series following engaged couples as they prepare for their sangeet, an Indian pre-wedding tradition. Jonas was announced as an executive producer through Image 32, and Chopra Jonas would executive produce through Purple Pebble Productions.

Television
| Year | Title | Role | Notes |
|---|---|---|---|
| 2020 | Dash & Lily | Himself/Performer | Executive Producer |
| TBA | Untitled Sangeet Project | | Executive Producer |

== Public image ==
During the early stages of their career, the Jonas Brothers were seen as role models and teen idols by their fans, and they drew much media attention when they made the decision to begin wearing purity rings during their time on the Disney Channel. Though he has stated that the rings helped "shape [his] view of sex", Nick felt that his faith became more about his personal relationship with God. He claimed in 2016 that all of the youth at their church had been asked to wear them, and he did not have a "full understanding" of what the ring meant. Jonas has more recently earned the title of a sex symbol following a string of provocative photo shoots. He has often rejected the title, stating that: "I don't really consider myself [a sex symbol]. If someone wants to give me that title, that's fine, but I don't say these words about myself. I just try to be humble, make sexy music and push the envelope a little bit."

Jonas was featured on OK!'s list of 2014's Sexiest Men Alive, while his photo shoot for Flaunt was listed on their Most Memorable Naked Moments list. He was ranked at number ten on People's Sexiest Men Alive list in 2015. He was ranked in sixth place on Capital FM's list of Sexiest Men in Pop during 2016. Jonas' new public image has led to him receiving a large fan following in the LGBT community, a fact he claims to be "thrilled" about. Some of Jonas' interviews and comments have drawn criticism for being "gay pandering", though Jonas has denied these claims. He was deemed Sexiest Reality Show Judge in the 2020 People's Sexiest Men Alive poll. That same year, he was also nominated alongside Joe and Kevin for Sexiest Brothers.

== Personal life ==
=== Health ===
Jonas was diagnosed with type 1 diabetes at the age of thirteen and uses an insulin pump to help him manage his condition. He has developed the Change for the Children Foundation; partnering with five different charities, their goal is to raise money and awareness for diabetes. He also developed a public service announcement with the Washington Nationals to support diabetes care at Children's National Medical Center in Washington, D.C. Since August 6, 2008, Bayer Diabetes Care has partnered with Jonas as a diabetes ambassador to encourage young people to manage their diabetes. Jonas testified in the U.S. Senate to promote more research funding for the condition.

=== Relationships ===
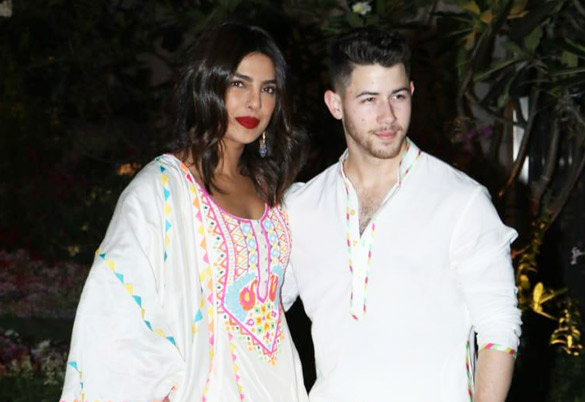
Chopra and Jonas at a Holi celebration party in Mumbai in 2020

Jonas dated fellow Disney star Miley Cyrus from June 2006 to December 2007. He also briefly dated another Disney star, Selena Gomez, in 2008, and she appeared in his band's music video for "Burnin' Up". In May 2011, Jonas started dating Australian singer Delta Goodrem. They broke up in February 2012. Jonas started dating model and Miss Universe 2012, Olivia Culpo, in 2013. They ended their relationship in 2015 after nearly two years of dating. Culpo is the inspiration for, and appears in the music video of, Jonas's most successful song to date, 2014 smash hit "Jealous".

In May 2018, Jonas started dating Indian actress Priyanka Chopra. Jonas proposed to her on July 19, 2018, a day after her birthday, in Crete, Greece. Jonas and Chopra got formally engaged the following month in a Punjabi Roka ceremony in Mumbai. In December 2018, the couple married at Umaid Bhawan Palace, Jodhpur, in traditional Hindu and Christian ceremonies. The ceremony was photographed by Jose Villa. In January 2022, Jonas announced that he and Chopra had welcomed their first child, a daughter, Malti Marie Chopra Jonas, via surrogacy.

=== Philanthropy ===
In 2009, Jonas was involved in "Disney's Friends for Change", an organization which promoted "environmentally-friendly behavior", alongside his brothers. Jonas Brothers, Demi Lovato, Miley Cyrus, and Selena Gomez, as the ad hoc musical team "Disney's Friends For Change", recorded the charity single "Send It On", all of the proceeds of which were accepted into the Disney Worldwide Conservation Fund. It debuted on the Billboard Hot 100 at No. 20.

In January 2010, Jonas donated $25,000 from his family foundation to the North Texas Food Bank. He made the visit as part of a joint effort with the television program The Biggest Loser and Feeding America, a national network of food banks. In the same year, Jonas further volunteered his efforts for Do Something by offering his time as a prize to teens who donated jeans to Do Something and Aeropostale's "Teens for Jeans" campaign. Further, Jonas filmed another PSA, this one in support of Do Something's "Battle of the Bands" campaign, for the advancement of music education in schools. Jonas is also a member of the National Youth Leadership Committee for the Ronald Reagan Centennial Celebration, along with Jordin Sparks, Genevieve Ryan, and Brodi Conover.

In 2017, Jonas, alongside Demi Lovato and DNCE, began a Crowd Rise campaign to raise money to support Hurricane Harvey relief.

In March 2020, Jonas and his wife, Priyanka Chopra, announced they have donated to several organizations, including UNICEF, Feeding America, Goonj, Doctors Without Borders, No Kid Hungry, GiveIndia, PM CARES Fund, and others to help fight the outbreak of COVID-19. They also made donations to the Equal Justice Initiative and American Civil Liberties Union, amid the widespread protests over the murder of George Floyd in June 2020. The next month, they made donations to Bihar and Assam flood relief organizations following the Assam flood and asked their fans to provide help and support as well.

In April 2021, Jonas and Chopra urged fans to donate to the GiveIndia NGO through their fundraiser "Together for India" during the resurgence of the COVID-19 pandemic in India. By 13 May 2021, the fundraiser had reached their initial target of $1 million, and they subsequently raised the target to $3 million.

== Discography ==
Solo albums

- Nicholas Jonas (2004)
- Nick Jonas (2014)
- Last Year Was Complicated (2016)
- Spaceman (2021)
- Sunday Best (2026)

with The Administration

- Who I Am (2010)

with the Jonas Brothers

- It's About Time (2006)
- Jonas Brothers (2007)
- A Little Bit Longer (2008)
- Lines, Vines and Trying Times (2009)
- Happiness Begins (2019)
- The Album (2023)
- Greetings from Your Hometown (2025)

== Filmography ==
=== Theatre ===
| Year | Title | Role | Notes |
|---|---|---|---|
| 2000 | A Christmas Carol | Tiny Tim | |
| 2001 | Annie Get Your Gun | Little Jake | Broadway |
| 2002 | Beauty and the Beast | Chip | Broadway |
| 2003 | Les Misérables | Gavroche | Broadway |
| 2003 | The Sound of Music | Kurt | PaperMill Playhouse |
| 2010 | Les Misérables | Marius Pontmercy | West End, June 21, 2010 – July 24, 2010 |
| 2010 | Les Misérables | Marius Pontmercy | October 3, 2010 (25th Anniversary Concert) |
| 2011 | Hairspray | Link Larkin | August 5–7, 2011 at the Hollywood Bowl |
| 2012 | How to Succeed in Business Without Really Trying | J. Pierrepont Finch | Broadway, January 24 – May 20, 2012 |
| 2021 | Chicken & Biscuits | Producer | Broadway |
| 2023 | Jonas Brothers on Broadway | Himself | Broadway residency, March 14–18, 2023 |
| 2025 | The Last Five Years | Jamie Wellerstein | Broadway, March 18 - June 22, 2025 |

=== Film ===
Film
| Year | Title | Role | Notes |
|---|---|---|---|
| 2009 | Night at the Museum: Battle of the Smithsonian | Cherub | Voice |
| 2015 | Careful What You Wish For | Doug Martin | |
| 2016 | Goat | Brett Land | |
| 2017 | Jumanji: Welcome to the Jungle | Jefferson "Seaplane" McDonough | |
| 2019 | UglyDolls | Lou | Voice |
| 2019 | Midway | Aviation Machinist Mate Bruno Gaido | |
| 2019 | Jumanji: The Next Level | Jefferson "Seaplane" McDonough | |
| 2021 | Chaos Walking | Davy Prentiss Jr. | |
| 2023 | Love Again | Joel | |
| 2023 | The Good Half | Renn Wheeland | |
| 2025 | You're Cordially Invited | Pastor Luther | |
| 2025 | A Very Jonas Christmas Movie | Himself | Also producer |
| 2025 | A Very Jonas Christmas Movie Yule Log | Himself | |
| 2026 | Power Ballad | Danny | |
| 2026 | Jumanji: Open World † | Jefferson "Seaplane" McDonough | Post-production |
| TBA | White Elephant † | | Post-production; Also producer |

Concert/ Documentary Film
| Year | Title | Role | Notes |
|---|---|---|---|
| 2008 | Hannah Montana and Miley Cyrus: Best of Both Worlds Concert | Himself | Concert Film |
| 2009 | Jonas Brothers: The 3D Concert Experience | Himself | Concert Film |
| 2010 | Les Misérables: 25th Anniversary Concert | Marius Pontmercy | Concert Film |
| 2015 | Taylor Swift: The 1989 World Tour Live | Himself | Concert film |
| 2017 | Demi Lovato: Simply Complicated | Himself | Documentary film |
| 2019 | Chasing Happiness | Himself | Documentary film |
| 2020 | Happiness Continues: A Jonas Brothers Concert Film | Himself | Concert Film, Documentary film |
| TBA | Jersey Boys † | Frankie Valli | Musical Taping |

=== TV ===
Television
| Year | Title | Role | Notes |
|---|---|---|---|
| 2007 | Hannah Montana | Himself | Episode: "Me and Mr. Jonas and Mr. Jonas and Mr. Jonas" |
| 2008 | Camp Rock | Nate Gray | Television film |
| 2009–2010 | Jonas | Nick Lucas | 33 episodes |
| 2010 | Camp Rock 2: The Final Jam | Nate Gray | Television film |
| 2011 | Mr. Sunshine | Eli White | Episode: "Employee of the Year" |
| 2011 | Last Man Standing | Ryan Vogelson | Episode: "Last Christmas Standing" |
| 2012 | Smash | Lyle West | 2 episodes |
| 2012 | Submissions Only | Lonely Dancer | Episode: "Another Interruption" |
| 2013–2015 | Hawaii Five-0 | Ian Wright | 3 episodes |
| 2014–2017 | Kingdom | Nate Kulina | 40 episodes |
| 2015 | Scream Queens | Boone Clemens | 5 episodes |
| 2020 | Dash & Lily | Himself | Episode: "New Year's Eve" |
| 2021 | Calls | Sam | Episode: "The Universe Did It" |
| 2026 | Camp Rock 3 | Nate Gray | Television film |

Reality television
| Year | Title | Notes |
|---|---|---|
| 2008 | Disney Channel Games | 5 episodes; part of Red Team |
| 2008–2010 | Jonas Brothers: Living the Dream | 18 episodes |
| 2008–2010 | Extreme Makeover: Home Edition | "The Akers Family" (Season 6, Episode 2), "The Heathcock Family" (Season 7, Episode 17) |
| 2009 | Band in a Bus | Reality DVD |
| 2010 | I Get That a Lot | May 19, 2010 episode |
| 2010 | The Biggest Loser | Season 10, Episode 13 |
| 2012 | The X Factor | Season 2 (Judges Houses) 1, 2, 3 (October 10–11 & October 17) |
| 2012–2013 | Married to Jonas | 4 episodes |
| 2015, 2020–2021 | The Voice | Season 8 (The Battle Round), Season 18 and Season 20 coach |
| 2016 | CMT Crossroads | Summer 2016 performance with Thomas Rhett |
| 2016 | Running Wild with Bear Grylls | Location: Sierra Nevada |
| 2019 | Songland | Episode: "Jonas Brothers" |
| 2021 | Olympic Dreams Featuring Jonas Brothers | NBC special |
| 2021 | Jonas Brothers Family Roast | Netflix special |
| 2022 | Dancing with Myself | dance creators |

Guest appearances
| Year | Title | Notes |
|---|---|---|
| 2008 | Studio DC: Almost Live | Second show |
| 2009–2021 | Saturday Night Live | 2009 (musical guest/sketches), 2016 (musical guest/sketches), 2019 (musical guest), 2021 (Host/musical guest) |
| 2010 | Live! with Regis and Kelly | January 8, 2010 episode |
| 2010 | Minute to Win It | May 12, 2010 episode |
| 2012 | Opening Act | Nick Jonas & Patrick Tanner |
| 2013 | Miss USA 2013 | Host and performer with Jonas Brothers |
| 2015 | 2015 Kids' Choice Awards | First time hosting an awards show |
| 2016 | Maya & Marty | June 14, 2016 episode |
| 2016–2019 | Carpool Karaoke | May 16, 2016 episode alongside Demi Lovato; March 7, 2019 episode alongside Joe and Kevin Jonas |
| 2020 | Dash & Lily | Performed Like It's Christmas alongside Joe and Kevin Jonas |
| 2021 | 2021 Billboard Music Awards | Second time hosting an awards show |
| 2021 | My Life | Highlights show |

=== Web ===
Web
| Year | Title | Role | Notes | Ref. |
|---|---|---|---|---|
| 2009 | KSM: Read Between the Lines | Himself | Episode: "Hangin' with the Jonas Brothers" | |
| 2021 | Jonas Brothers: Moments Between The Moments | Himself | Mini Series | |

=== Music videos ===
Music video appearance
| Year | Title | Artist | Notes |
|---|---|---|---|
| 2011 | "My Time" | Gabrielle Giguere | Producer, cameo |
| 2015 | "OXO" (Lyric Video) | Olivia Somerlyn | Cameo |

=== Commercials ===
Commercials
| Year | Brand(s) | Role | Ref. |
|---|---|---|---|
| 2023 | Dexcom | Himself | |

== Tours ==
With The Administration

- Who I Am Tour (2010)
- Nick Jonas 2011 Tour (2011)

Headlining

- Nick Jonas Live (2014)
- Nick Jonas: Live in Concert (2015)
- A Night with Nick (2026)

Co-headlining

- Future Now Tour (with Demi Lovato) (2016)

Opening act

- Maroon V Tour (Maroon 5) (2015)
- 24K Magic World Tour (Bruno Mars) (2018)

== Awards and nominations ==
| Year | Title | Award | Nominated work | Result |
|---|---|---|---|---|
| 2009 | Los Premios MTV Latinoamérica | Best Fashionista (Most Fashionable) | Himself | Won |
| 2010 | Kids' Choice Awards | Favorite TV Actor | Himself | Nominated |
| 2010 | Nickelodeon Mexico Kids' Choice Awards | Favorite International Character Male | Himself | Nominated |
| 2010 | Teen Choice Awards | Choice Music: Love Song | "Stay" | Nominated |
| 2010 | Teen Choice Awards | Choice Breakout Artist: Male | Nick Jonas & The Administration | Nominated |
| 2010 | Young Hollywood Awards | Young Hollywood Artist of the Year | Himself | Won |
| 2011 | Kids' Choice Awards | Favorite TV Actor | Himself | Nominated |
| 2011 | DRLC | DREAM Award | Himself | Won |
| 2012 | Broadway Beacon Awards 2012 | "Contributions to the theater community" | Himself | Won |
| 2013 | Teen Choice Awards | Acuvue Inspire Award | Himself | Won |
| 2014 | Young Hollywood Awards | Coolest Crossover Artist | Himself | Won |
| 2014 | MTV European Music Awards | Artist on the Rise | Himself | Nominated |
| 2015 | Kids' Choice Awards | Favorite Male Singer | Himself | Won |
| 2015 | Radio Disney Music Awards | He's The One – Best Male Artist | Himself | Nominated |
| 2015 | Radio Disney Music Awards | XOXO – Best Crush Song | "Jealous" | Nominated |
| 2015 | Much Music Video Awards | Favorite International Artist | Himself | Nominated |
| 2015 | Teen Choice Awards | Choice Male Artist | Himself | Nominated |
| 2015 | Teen Choice Awards | Choice Song: Male Artist | "Jealous" | Nominated |
| 2015 | MTV Video Music Awards | Best Male Video | "Chains" | Nominated |
| 2015 | MTV Europe Music Award | Best US Act | Himself | Nominated |
| 2015 | American Music Awards | Favorite Male Artist – Pop/Rock | Himself | Nominated |
| 2016 | People's Choice Awards | Favorite Premium Cable TV Actor | Kingdom | Nominated |
| 2016 | People's Choice Awards | Favorite Male Artist | Himself | Nominated |
| 2016 | Kids' Choice Awards | Favorite Male Singer | Himself | Nominated |
| 2016 | Radio Disney Music Awards | He's The One – Best Male Artist | Himself | Nominated |
| 2016 | iHeartRadio Music Awards | Triple Threat Artist | Himself | Nominated |
| 2016 | Hal David Starlight Award | Hal David Starlight Award | Himself | Won |
| 2016 | BMI Awards | Pop Songwriter | "Jealous" | Won |
| 2016 | iHeartRadio Much Music Video Awards | iHeartRadio International Artist of the Year | Himself – "Close" | Won |
| 2016 | iHeartRadio Much Music Video Awards | Most Buzzworthy International Artist or Group | Himself – "Close" | Nominated |
| 2016 | Teen Choice Awards | Choice Music: Male Artist | Himself | Nominated |
| 2016 | Teen Choice Awards | Choice Music Single: Male | "Close" – Nick Jonas featuring Tove Lo | Nominated |
| 2016 | Teen Choice Awards | Choice Music: Love Song | "Close" – Nick Jonas featuring Tove Lo | Nominated |
| 2016 | Teen Choice Awards | Choice Summer Music Star: Male | Himself | Nominated |
| 2016 | Teen Choice Awards | Choice Summer Tour | "Future Now Tour" – Demi Lovato and Nick Jonas | Nominated |
| 2016 | Teen Choice Awards | Choice Style: Male | Himself | Won |
| 2016 | MTV Video Music Awards | Song of Summer | "Bacon" | Nominated |
| 2017 | People's Choice Awards | Favorite Premium Series Actor | Kingdom | Nominated |
| 2017 | Radio Disney Music Awards | He's The one – Best Male Artist | Himself | Nominated |
| 2017 | Radio Disney Music Awards | Stuck In Our Heads – Best Song To Lip Sync To | Bacon | Nominated |
| 2017 | Radio Disney Music Awards | I'm With The Band! – Radio Disney Favorite Tour | Himself & Demi Lovato – Future now tour | Nominated |
| 2017 | Radio Disney Music Awards | Hero Award | Himself | Won |
| 2017 | CMT Music Awards | CMT Performance of the Year | "Close" – with Thomas Rhett | Nominated |
| 2018 | 75th Golden Globe Awards | Best Original Song – Motion Picture | Home | Nominated |
| 2018 | Guild of Music Supervisors' GMS Awards | Best Song/Recording Created for a Film | Home | Nominated |
| 2018 | 2018 MTV Movie & TV Awards | Best On-Screen Team | Dwayne Johnson, Kevin Hart, Jack Black, Karen Gillan and Nick Jonas – Jumanji: Welcome to the Jungle | Nominated |
| 2018 | 2018 Teen Choice Awards | ChoiceSceneStealer | Jumanji: Welcome to the Jungle as Jefferson "Seaplane" McDonough | Nominated |
| 2018 | 2018 MTV Europe Music Awards | Best World Stage | Himself | Nominated |
| 2021 | Streamy Awards | Crossover | Himself | Nominated |
