= Happiness Continues: A Jonas Brothers Concert Film =

2020 concert film

- Official release poster
- Directed by: Anthony Mandler
- Produced by: Phil McIntyre; John Lloyd Taylor; Monte Lipman; Wendy Goldstein; Baz Halpin
- Starring: Kevin Jonas; Joe Jonas; Nick Jonas
- Music by: Jonas Brothers
- Production company: Amazon Studios
- Distributed by: Amazon Prime Video
- Release date: April 24, 2020
- Running time: 104 minutes
- Country: United States
- Language: English

Happiness Continues: A Jonas Brothers Concert Film (also referred to as simply Happiness Continues) is a 2020 concert film starring American pop rock band Jonas Brothers, and directed by Anthony Mandler. It was released globally at Amazon Prime Video on April 24, 2020. The film depicts the Jonas Brothers as they perform on their reunion concert tour, Happiness Begins (2019-2020).

The concert film serves as a follow-up to the 2019 documentary Chasing Happiness.

== Synopsis ==
The Jonas Brothers perform their reunion world concert tour, the Happiness Begins Tour (2019-2020). The film provides footage from the backstage and routine of the band while on the road, as well as one on one interviews with Nick, Kevin and Joe Jonas.

== Background ==
The film was announced by the band, as a surprise release, less than one day before the release. After the announcement, the brothers started a live stream video to comment on what fans should expect from the movie.

== Production ==
Filming took place on different cities during the Happiness Begins Tour, including the tour's first stop at Miami, Florida, as well as the New York City concerts at Madison Square Garden.

== Release ==
The film was released on April 24, 2020, and serves as a follow-up to the 2019 documentary, Chasing Happiness.

The set list for the concert features song's from the band's old catalog, like "Burnin' Up", "S.O.S", and "Year 3000", and songs from their comeback album, Happiness Begins.

== Reception ==
Writing for TV Guide, Lindsay MacDonald commented that the movie seems like "pure happiness", and that it could cheer the Jonas Brothers fans, since it was released during the COVID-19 pandemic, when live concerts around the world were being canceled. Katie Green from Platform Magazine recommended the film, as well as the previous documentary, Chasing Happiness, stating that the concert film would be worth watching, not only by the fans, but for general audiences, while the world was in lockdown. She wrote that the behind-the-scenes parts, showcasing the brothers' relationship with their families, were a highlight of the film.
