= Chasing Happiness =

2019 documentary film by John Lloyd Taylor

- Official release poster
- Directed by: John Lloyd Taylor
- Produced by: Reece Pearson; Grant Macdowell
- Starring: Kevin Jonas; Joe Jonas; Nick Jonas
- Music by: Jonas Brothers
- Production companies: Amazon Studios; Philymack
- Distributed by: Amazon Prime Video
- Release date: June 4, 2019
- Running time: 96 minutes
- Country: United States
- Language: English

Chasing Happiness (also known as Jonas Brothers: Chasing Happiness) is a 2019 American documentary film that follows the American pop rock band Jonas Brothers and their lives since the band's break up in 2013, until their reunion in 2019. It was directed by John Lloyd Taylor, produced by Reece Pearson and Grant Macdowell, and released to Amazon Prime Video on July 4, 2019.

A follow-up, Happiness Continues: A Jonas Brothers Concert Film, chronicles the brothers as they travel the world to perform for the Happiness Begins Tour.

== Synopsis ==
After the Jonas Brothers break up in 2013, the band members chased their individual projects. In 2019, they discuss the details of what drove them apart, and what made them want to reunite as a band once more.

== Background ==
On April 22, 2019, the Jonas Brothers announced their then-upcoming reunion album Happiness Begins (2019), which was set to be released on June 7, 2019. The album was preceded by the documentary, titled Chasing Happiness, which was set to premiere worldwide on June 4, 2019, on Amazon Prime Video. The trailer for the film was released online on May 9, 2019.

== Release ==
The documentary film was released on June 4, 2019, three days before the release of their reunion fifth studio album, Happiness Begins.

Happiness Continues: A Jonas Brothers Concert Film, which chronicles the brothers as they travel the world to perform for the Happiness Begins Tour, displaying backstage routines as well as the performances, serves as a follow-up to Chasing Happiness.

== Music ==
To accompany the documentary, the band released a soundtrack, called Music from Chasing Happiness, released on May 9, 2019, through Republic Records. It was made available on CD, streaming services and digital download one month before the documentary's release.

Aside from the band's select old catalog, the soundtrack contains an original song, "Jersey", and a live rendition of their Billboard Hot 100 number one single Sucker.

== Reception ==
On the review aggregator website Rotten Tomatoes, 75% of 8 critics' reviews are positive, with an average rating of 7.0/10. Chris Willman, from entertainment magazine Variety, wrote that the documentary showcases an insightful view on the ups and downs for the band, the reasons they broke up and got back together. While he felt that the film, at times, feels somewhat fabricated and displays the band in the way they wanted to be displayed, it also showed some sides from the brothers that weren't all that positive, to which he noted made the documentary worthwhile.
