= Jonas Brothers: Living the Dream =

Television series

- Genre: Reality television
- Created by: Jonas Brothers
- Starring: Kevin Jonas; Joe Jonas; Nick Jonas
- Narrated by: Kevin Jonas; Joe Jonas; Nick Jonas
- Country of origin: United States
- Original language: English
- No. of seasons: 2
- No. of episodes: 29

Production
- Executive producer: Alan Sacks
- Producer: Erin Shockey
- Production locations: United States; Europe
- Editors: Jared Gutstadt; Timothy Dixon
- Running time: 6 minutes

Original release
- Network: Disney Channel
- Release: May 16, 2008 – May 31, 2010

Jonas Brothers: Living the Dream is an American reality television short series that aired from May 16, 2008, until May 31, 2010, on Disney Channel. The series followed the personal and touring lives of the sibling band trio Kevin Jonas, Joe Jonas and Nick Jonas, the Jonas Brothers, while on tour. The series' first season aired from May 16, 2008, to September 5, 2008, while the second and final season ended aired March 21, 2010, to May 31, 2010.

== Cast ==
- Kevin Jonas
- Joe Jonas
- Nick Jonas

== Episodes ==
=== Series overview ===
Season	Episodes	Originally released	
Season	Episodes	First released	Last released
1	16	May 16, 2008	September 5, 2008
2	11	March 21, 2010	May 31, 2010

=== Season 1 (2008) ===
The first season followed the Jonas Brothers as they embarked on their When You Look Me in the Eyes Tour in 2008.

No. overall	No. in season	Title	Narrated by	Original release date
1	1	"To Do List"	Nick	May 16, 2008
2	2	"The Big Game"	Kevin	May 23, 2008
3	3	"Downtime Jonas Style"	Joe	May 30, 2008
4	4	"Our Fans Rock"	Kevin	June 6, 2008
5	5	"Driver's Ed"	Joe	June 13, 2008
6	6	"Our Mom and Dad"	Joe	June 20, 2008
7	7	"Hello Hollywood"	Joe	June 27, 2008
8	8	"Health Kick"	Joe	July 4, 2008
9	9	"We Are Family"	Kevin	July 11, 2008
10	10	"School Rocks"	Nick	July 18, 2008
11	11	"Musical Scrapbook"	Nick	July 25, 2008
12	12	"Nothing's Gonna Slow Me Down"	Nick	August 1, 2008
13	13	"Rock Star in Training"	Nick	August 8, 2008
14	14	"We're the Boss"	Kevin	August 15, 2008
15	15	"Dream On"	Kevin	August 22, 2008
16	16	"Best Of: Jonas Brothers Living The Dream"	Nick, Joe and Kevin	September 5, 2008
17	17	"Fashion Rocks"	Kevin	September 12, 2008
18	18	"It's Cool to be Different"	Nick	September 26, 2008

=== Season 2 (2010) ===
Season 2 followed the Jonas Brothers as they embarked on the European legs of their 2009 world tour.

No. overall	No. in season	Title	Narrated by	Original release date
19	1	"Kick Off"	Kevin	March 21, 2010
20	2	"Healthy Living"	Joe	March 28, 2010
21	3	"Keeping It Real"	Nick	April 11, 2010
22	4	"We Are Our Music"	Nick	April 18, 2010
23	5	"Rockin' Acts of Kindness"	Joe	April 25, 2010
24	6	"Universal Language of Music"	Joe	May 2, 2010
25	7	"Team Jonas"	Kevin	May 9, 2010
26	8	"Out of My Control"	Nick	May 16, 2010
27	9	"My Other Big Dream"	Joe	May 24, 2010
28	10	"Who I Am"	Nick	May 30, 2010
29	11	"3 Guys and a Dream"	Kevin	May 31, 2010
