= Every Other Time =

2001 single by LFO

Single by LFO

from the album Life Is Good
- B-side: "Life Is Good"; "Erase Her"; "Summer Girls"
- Released: May 29, 2001
- Length: 4:07
- Label: J
- Songwriters: Rich Cronin, Kenny Gioia, Shep Goodman
- Producers: Kenny Gioia, Shep Goodman

LFO singles chronology
"West Side Story" (2000)	"Every Other Time" (2001)	"Life Is Good" (2002)

Audio sample
- A sample from LFO's "Every Other Time": file; help

"Every Other Time" is a song by American pop band LFO. It was released on May 29, 2001, as the first single of their final album, Life Is Good (2001). The song reached number 44 on the US Billboard Hot 100, number 24 on the UK Singles Chart, and number 18 on the New Zealand Singles Chart.

== Critical reception ==
Chuck Taylor of Billboard magazine reviewed the song favorably, saying that it "shapes its personality around the elements of a traditional live band: guitars, bass, percussion." He goes on to say that this track demonstrates "evolution, maintaining a clever chorus and some memorable instrumental hooks but, thankfully, shedding the gimmicky sing-song elements of those previous radio staples."

== Track listings ==
US 7-inch single

A. "Every Other Time"
B. "Life Is Good"

UK CD single

1. "Every Other Time" – 4:07
2. "Erase Her" – 4:25
3. "Every Other Time" (video)
4. Lyrics and album sampler

European CD single

1. "Every Other Time" – 3:55
2. "Erase Her" – 4:27
3. "Summer Girls" – 4:17
4. "Every Other Time" (video)

== Charts ==
=== Weekly charts ===
Chart (2001)	Peak position
Germany (GfK)	98
New Zealand (Recorded Music NZ)	18
Scottish Singles Sales (Official Charts)	13
UK Singles (Official Charts)	24
US Billboard Hot 100	44
US Mainstream Top 40 (Billboard)	8

=== Year-end charts ===
Chart (2001)	Position
US Mainstream Top 40 (Billboard)	38

== Release history ==
Region	Date	Format	Label	Ref.
United States	May 29, 2001	Contemporary hit radio	J	
Denmark	September 17, 2001	CD	J	
New Zealand	October 22, 2001	CD	J	
Australia	October 29, 2001	CD	J	
