= It's About Time (Jonas Brothers album) =

Studio album by Jonas Brothers
- Released: August 8, 2006
- Recorded: July–August 2005; April 2006 (tracks 1, 3 and 11)
- Studio: Mojo Music Ltd, Quad Studios (Nashville, TN)
- Genre: Pop rock; pop-punk
- Length: 35:54
- Label: Columbia; INO; Daylight
- Producer: Michael Mangini; Steve Greenberg

Jonas Brothers chronology
It's About Time (2006)	Jonas Brothers (2007)

Singles from It's About Time
- 1. "Mandy" Released: March 20, 2006; 2. "Year 3000" Released: May 16, 2006

It's About Time is the debut studio album from the Jonas Brothers. It was released on August 8, 2006, through Columbia Records. The album was released through Columbia's Daylight Records imprint. A DualDisc of this version of the album was also released. The DualDisc version contains the complete 3-part video for the album's lead single "Mandy".

After Columbia Records dropped the group from their roster list, they signed with Hollywood. Hollywood received the rights to distribute the single "Year 3000" which was also released on the group's first Hollywood Records album. The album also managed to sell 123,000 copies in the US.

In August 2012, the Jonas Brothers announced the vinyl re-release of the album exclusively in the 2012 gift for premium members of Team Jonas along with a digital download with each vinyl album.

== Background ==
It's About Time was produced by Michael Mangini and Steve Greenberg. The album was inspired by personal experiences from the band, such as the highs and lows of dating, being on the road and having been given the opportunity to follow their dreams at such a young age. Nick Jonas stated, "A lot of it is about typical teenage love stuff like 'Oh, what am I going to do if I can't see her today?' It's not stuff that we don't know about."

One of the songs on the album, "Time for Me to Fly", was featured in the film Aquamarine in 2006. The songs "What I Go to School For" and "Year 3000" are covers originally by English pop rock band Busted.

== Singles ==
"Mandy"
A sample of "Mandy" performed live by Jonas Brothers, serviced as the lead single from It's About Time.

"Mandy" was sent to contemporary hit radio in the United States on March 20, 2006, as the first single from the album. "Year 3000" was released on May 16, 2006, as the album's second single. The song peaked at number 31 on the Billboard Hot 100.

== Tours ==
On November 5, 2005, Jonas Brothers began their first promo tour in support of the album. Their second tour, Jonas Brothers American Club Tour, promoted abstinence from illegal drugs. The tour consisted of gigs in clubs, and with small crowds. The tour started on January 28, 2006, and ended on March 3, 2006, with a total of 28 shows. A week later, they made their national TV debut on TRL.

== Vinyl release ==
In August 2012, the album was made available on vinyl as an exclusive gift for renewing or new premium members of Team Jonas. The vinyl release also includes a digital download of the album and a thank you note from Kevin, Joe and Nick. Select copies were autographed by the brothers and mailed out randomly along with one of three Jonas Brothers turntables by Crossley Turntables.

== Critical reception ==
Professional ratings
Review scores
Source	Rating
AllMusic	3.5/5 stars
Cross Rhythms	5/10 squares
Jesus Freak Hideout	1.5/5 stars

It's About Time was met with mixed reviews from music critics. Stephen Thomas Erlewine of AllMusic gave a positive review for the album stating, "at its best, bubblegum has an effervescence that transcends generations, something that the Jonas Brothers come close to achieving here. They're a likeable bunch of kids singing likeable, ingratiating melodies that are perhaps a little too sweet but are still irresistible." He compared the group's pop punk sound to Hanson. He ended off remarking, "It's About Time is a fun debut, with more hooks than most teen-oriented music in 2006." A mixed review came from Mike Rimmer of Cross Rhythms who criticized the album for having "generic teenage songs". However, he highlighted Nick Jonas' vocals on "One Day At A Time", as well as praising the tracks "I Am What I Am" and "What I Go To School For". John DiBiase of Jesus Freak Hideout gave a negative review for the album noting, "It's About Time bears similar schizophrenic and mismatched songwriting." He also added, "The end result just feels like the byproduct of a few hyperactive kids with a lack of focus."

=== Commercial performance ===
It's About Time peaked at number 91 on the Billboard 200 and sold 67,000 copies in the US. Due to poor album sales, Columbia Records dropped the band and stopped printing and distributing copies of the album in late 2006. As of March 2015, the album sold 123,000 copies in the United States.

== Track listing ==
It's About Time track listing
No.	Title	Writer(s)	Length
1.	"What I Go to School For"	Charlie Simpson; James Bourne; John McLaughlin; Matt Willis; Steve Robson	3:33
2.	"Time for Me to Fly"	Joseph Jonas; Kevin Jonas II; Nicholas Jonas; PJ Bianco	3:05
3.	"Year 3000"	Simpson; Bourne; Willis; Robson	3:21
4.	"One Day at a Time"	J. Jonas; K. Jonas; N. Jonas; Michael Mangini; Steve Greenberg	3:54
5.	"6 Minutes"	Joe Belmaati; Kenny Gioia; Mich Hansen; Rich Cronin; Michael Goodman	3:06
6.	"Mandy"	J. Jonas; K. Jonas; N. Jonas	2:48
7.	"You Just Don't Know It"	J. Jonas; K. Jonas; N. Jonas; Desmond Child	3:37
8.	"I Am What I Am"	Adam Schlesinger	2:10
9.	"Underdog"	J. Jonas; K. Jonas; N. Jonas; Jess Cates; Stargate	3:15
10.	"7:05"	J. Jonas; K. Jonas; N. Jonas; Mangini	3:47
11.	"Please Be Mine"	J. Jonas; K. Jonas; N. Jonas	3:13
Total length:			35:49

Notes

- All tracks are produced by Michael Mangini and Steve Greenberg, except tracks 1 and 3 (produced by LCV) and track 11 (produced by Jon Kaplan).
- "What I Go to School For" and "Year 3000" are covers of English pop-punk band Busted.
- "6 Minutes" is a cover of American pop and hip-hop band LFO.

== Personnel ==
Credits for It's About Time adapted from AllMusic.

=== Jonas Brothers ===
- Nick Jonas – lead vocals, guitar, keyboard, drums
- Joe Jonas – lead vocals, tambourine, keyboard
- Kevin Jonas – guitar, background vocals

=== Additional musicians ===
- John R. Angier – piano
- Jimmie Bones – guitar
- Thad DeBrock – drums
- Steve Greenwell – bass guitar, keyboards
- Jon Leidersdorff – drums
- Michael Mangini – guitar, keyboards

=== Production ===
- Jake Chessum – photography
- Chris Gehringer – mastering
- David Gray – A&R
- Steve Greenberg – producer (2, 4–10)
- Steve Greenwell – engineering (2, 4–10), mixing (8–10)
- Femio Hernández – mixing assistant (2, 4–7)
- Kevin Jonas Sr. – management
- Jon Kaplan – producer, engineer, and mixing (11)
- LCV – producer, engineer, mixing, and all instruments (1, 3)
- Tom Lord-Alge – mixing (2, 4–7)
- Aimee MacAuley – design
- Michael Mangini – producer (2, 4–10)
- Maria P. Marulanda – art direction
- David Massey – A&R
- Chris Roach – assistant engineering (1, 3)
- Johnny Wright – management
- Ken Wright – assistant engineering (2, 4–10)

== Charts ==
Chart (2006)	Peak position
US Billboard 200	91

== Release history ==
Release dates and formats for It's About Time
Region	Date	Format	Label	Ref.
Canada	August 8, 2006	CD	Columbia	
United States	August 8, 2006	CD	Columbia	
