= Sureshot =

Sureshot or Sure Shot may refer to:

== Music ==
- "Sure Shot", a Beastie Boys song
- Sureshot (band), an American pop music group
- Sure Shot (rapper), an alias of British hip hop musician Mark Duffus (a.k.a. Blak Prophetz)
- "Sure Shot", a 1980 song by Crown Heights Affair
- "Sure Shot", a 1993 song by Polvo
- "Sure Shot", a 1981 song by Tracy Weber
- "Sureshot", a 2001 song by Yellowcard from One for the Kids
- "Sure Shot", a 2022 song by Koda Kumi

== Other uses ==
- nickname of Fred Dunlap (1859-1902), American Major League Baseball player and manager
- nickname of Stella Dickson (1922-1995), American Depression-era bank robber with her husband Bennie
- American nickname of the Canon AF35M 35mm camera
- Sureshot (Transformers), a fictional character in the Transformers universe
- Mission Man Band, also known as Sureshot, a 2007 American reality TV series, also the name of the newly formed band that is the focus of the series
- Sureshot (film), a 1996 American film starring Danny Hoch and Mekhi Phifer

== See also ==
- Annie Oakley (1860-1926), American sharpshooter and exhibition shooter nicknamed "Little Sure Shot" and "Little Miss Sure Shot"
