= Dow Brain =

- Born: United States
- Genres: Pop, rock
- Occupation: Music producer

Dow Brain is an American music producer, songwriter/composer, and pianist. Brain's music production company, Underground Productions, Inc., was created in 1990 with partner Brad Young. Brain began working with Danny Wood of boy band New Kids on the Block in Boston. Danny Wood introduced Brain to Rich Cronin of the American pop band LFO. Brain is the co-writer and producer of both LFO's top 10 Billboard singles, "Summer Girls" and "Girl on TV." Brain has written and produced multiple Billboard charting albums and singles and has written music for films and TV shows, some include: Weeds, Kyle XY, The Sopranos, Greek, Scrubs, America's Funniest Videos, The Oprah Winfrey Show and several others.

== Career ==
Brain also produced and recorded UK pop vocalist Lauren Bennett’s vocal for the LMFAO hit "Party Rock Anthem", which became a number 1 hit on the Billboard pop charts.

Brain's other credits and discography also include Compositions for the Do It Again film score -- Robert Patton-Spruill’s documentary about The Boston Globe reporter Geoff Edgers' quest to reunite The Kinks; the theme song and much of the score for the TV Land hit series How'd You Get So Rich? featuring Joan Rivers; and the theme song for the History Channel series The Works.

Brain has produced five RIAA certified Platinum and Gold albums and singles, including a Platinum single for the number-one selling song "Summer Girls", recorded by LFO on Arista Records.
