= Sureshot (group) =

- Origin: Orlando, Florida, U.S.
- Genres: Pop, dance, R&B
- Years active: 2007-2008
- Past members: Bryan Abrams; Rich Cronin (deceased); Chris Kirkpatrick; Jeff Timmons
- Website: sureshotband.com

Sureshot was an American supergroup formed in 2007 on the reality television show, Mission: Man Band on VH1. The group consisted of four members who were previously in other singing groups prior to forming Sureshot:

- Bryan Abrams (Color Me Badd)
- Rich Cronin (LFO)
- Chris Kirkpatrick (*NSYNC)
- Jeff Timmons (98 Degrees)

The band had three songs on Mission: Man Band: "Work That Out", "Withoutcha", and "Story of My Life".
