= Mission Man Band =

American reality television series

- Genre: Reality
- Created by: MTV UK/VH1
- Developed by: Tijuana Entertainment
- Starring: Bryan Abrams; Rich Cronin; Chris Kirkpatrick; Jeff Timmons; Katie McNeil
- Country of origin: United States
- No. of seasons: 1
- No. of episodes: 7

Production
- Executive producers: Troy Searer; John Foy; Kennedy Etc.
- Running time: 30 mins.

Original release
- Network: VH1
- Release: August 6, 2007 – January 1, 2008

Related
- Totally Boyband

Mission: Man Band (also known as SureShot, Totally Boyband and Band of Men) is an American reality television series that first aired on VH1 on August 6, 2007.

== Overview ==
The show is based on a format produced by MTV UK (Totally Boyband), in which a boy band is formed with various members of successful pop acts from the past. The show follows the production, recording, performance and behind-the-scenes action involved in the run-up to the launch of their first single as a new group.

The group, which calls itself Sureshot, consisted of four members:

- Bryan Abrams (Color Me Badd)
- Rich Cronin (LFO)
- Chris Kirkpatrick (*NSYNC)
- Jeff Timmons (98 Degrees)

The four of them lived together for three weeks in Kirkpatrick's home in Orlando, Florida, and collectively wrote and produced songs with the help of professionals from the music industry, producer Bryan-Michael Cox, music manager Katie McNeil and vocal coach Gerry Williams as cameras followed their every move. On January 23, 2007, the group performed at halftime of an Orlando Magic basketball game, where they ended up being booed from the arena after their performance. The performance was filmed by VH1. On January 30, the group performed at Mansion in Miami, Florida, also filmed by VH1. Shooting for the show took place between January 15 and February 2, 2007.

The show was produced by Tijuana Entertainment, the same production team behind Breaking Bonaduce and Shooting Sizemore.

== See also ==
- Boy band
