= Metta Sandiford-Artest =

American basketball player (born 1979)

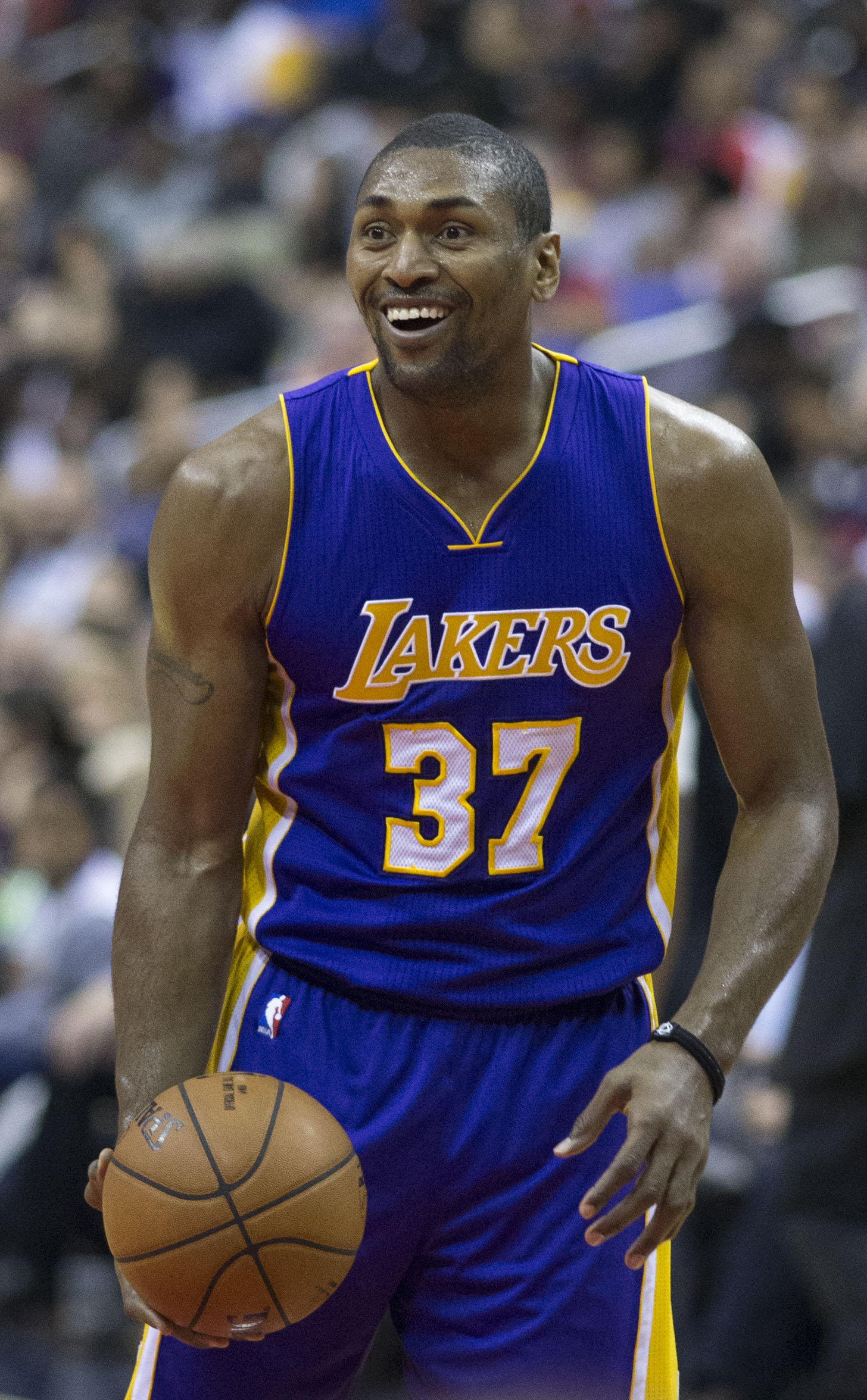
- Sandiford-Artest with the Los Angeles Lakers in 2015

Personal information
- Born: November 13, 1979 (age 47) Queens, New York, U.S.
- Listed height: 6 ft 7 in (2.01 m)
- Listed weight: 260 lb (118 kg)

Career information
- High school: La Salle Academy (Manhattan, New York)
- College: St. John's (1997–1999)
- NBA draft: 1999: 1st round, 16th overall pick
- Drafted by: Chicago Bulls
- Playing career: 1999–2017
- Position: Small forward
- Number: 15, 23, 91, 93, 96, 37, 51
- Coaching career: 2017–2018

Career history

Playing
- 1999–2002: Chicago Bulls
- 2002–2006: Indiana Pacers
- 2006–2008: Sacramento Kings
- 2008–2009: Houston Rockets
- 2009–2013: Los Angeles Lakers
- 2013–2014: New York Knicks
- 2014: Sichuan Blue Whales
- 2015: Cantù
- 2015–2017: Los Angeles Lakers

Coaching
- 2017–2018: South Bay Lakers (player development)

Career highlights
- NBA champion (2010); NBA All-Star (2004); All-NBA Third Team (2004); NBA Defensive Player of the Year (2004); 2× NBA All-Defensive First Team (2004, 2006); 2× NBA All-Defensive Second Team (2003, 2009); NBA All-Rookie Second Team (2000); Third-team All-American – AP, NABC (1999); Haggerty Award (1999); First-team All-Big East (1999); Second-team Parade All-American (1997); McDonald's All-American (1997)

Career NBA statistics
- Points: 13,058 (13.2 ppg)
- Rebounds: 4,448 (4.5 rpg)
- Assists: 2,631 (2.7 apg)
- Stats at NBA.com
- Stats at Basketball Reference

Metta Sandiford-Artest (born Ronald William Artest Jr., November 13, 1979), formerly known as Ron Artest (Note: Until 2011) and Metta World Peace, (Note: Metta World Peace was his legal name from 2011 to 2020.) is an American former professional basketball player who played 17 seasons in the National Basketball Association (NBA). He is considered one of the most feared perimeter “lockdown” defenders in NBA history. He played college basketball for the St. John's Red Storm. He was drafted by the Chicago Bulls in the first round of the 1999 NBA draft.

In 2001, he signed with the Indiana Pacers, where he won the NBA Defensive Player of the Year Award and was also named an NBA All-Star in 2004. Later that year, he was involved in a fight between the Pacers and the Detroit Pistons, and was suspended for the remainder of the 2004–05 season, the longest suspension for on-court misconduct in NBA history. Weeks after the start of the 2005–06 season, he was traded to the Sacramento Kings, and spent the 2008–09 season with the Houston Rockets. In 2009, he signed with the Los Angeles Lakers, and helped the team win the NBA championship in 2010. In 2013, he signed with the New York Knicks. After a year of hiatus from the NBA, he returned to the Lakers in 2015 before retiring in 2017.

== Early life ==
Metta Sandiford-Artest was born Ronald William Artest Jr. on November 13, 1979, and raised in Queensbridge in Long Island City, Queens, New York. He has two younger brothers, Isaiah and Daniel. He played high school basketball at La Salle Academy. He also teamed with future NBA players Elton Brand and Lamar Odom on the same Amateur Athletic Union (AAU) team.

Growing up, Artest witnessed the killing of a fellow player, 19-year-old Lloyd Newton, on a basketball court in Niagara Falls, New York, during an altercation at a 1991 YMCA-sanctioned basketball tournament. Artest recalled the incident during an interview in 2009: "I remember one time, one of my friends, he was playing basketball and they were winning the game. It was so competitive, they broke a leg from a table and they threw it and it went right through his heart and he died right on the court. So I'm accustomed playing basketball really rough."

== College career ==
Artest played college basketball at St. John's University from 1997 to 1999. At St. John's, he majored in mathematics. In 1999, he led the Red Storm to a 14–4 record in the Big East Conference and 28–9 overall and the Elite Eight of the NCAA Division I Tournament, losing to Ohio State.

== Professional career ==
=== Chicago Bulls (1999–2002) ===
Artest was selected by the Chicago Bulls with the 16th pick of the 1999 NBA draft.

Artest played a total of 175 games for the Bulls over 2 1/2 years, the bulk as a starter, during which time he averaged about 12.5 points and just over four rebounds per game. He was named to the NBA All-Rookie Second Team in the 1999–2000 season.

=== Indiana Pacers (2002–2006) ===
Midway through the 2001–02 season, Artest was traded by Chicago to the Indiana Pacers along with Ron Mercer, Brad Miller, and Kevin Ollie, for Jalen Rose, Travis Best, Norman Richardson, and a second-round draft pick. On January 27, 2003, Artest got into a verbal altercation with Miami Heat head coach Pat Riley and flashed an obscene gesture into the crowd and was suspended for four games. During the 2003–04 season with the Pacers, he averaged 18.3 points per game, 5.7 rebounds per game, and 3.7 assists per game. Artest made the 2004 NBA All-Star Game as a reserve and was named the Defensive Player of the Year. He wore three jersey numbers for the Pacers: 15, 23, and 91.

==== The Malice at the Palace ====
On November 19, 2004, Artest was at the center of an altercation among players and fans during a game in Auburn Hills, Michigan, between Artest's Pacers and the home team Detroit Pistons. The brawl involved Artest, Pistons center Ben Wallace, Artest's teammates Jermaine O'Neal and Stephen Jackson, several other players, and spectators including Pistons fans John Green and A. J. Shackleford.

The fight resulted in the game being stopped with less than a minute remaining. O'Neal, Jackson, and Wallace were suspended indefinitely the day after the game. A day later, the NBA suspended Artest for the rest of the regular season, plus any playoff games. Artest missed 86 games, the longest suspension for an on-court incident in NBA history.

==== Aftermath and trade ====
After playing 16 games early in the 2005–06 season, Artest demanded a trade from the Indiana Pacers, and he was placed on the team's inactive roster. Artest's call for a trade created a rift between him and his teammates. "We felt betrayed, a little disrespected," teammate Jermaine O'Neal said. As for their basketball relationship, O'Neal added: "The business relationship is over. That's fact." Pacers president Larry Bird said he also felt "betrayed" and "disappointed."

On January 24, 2006, reports from NBA sources confirmed that the Sacramento Kings had agreed to trade Peja Stojaković to the Pacers for Artest. However, before the trade could be completed, many press outlets reported that Artest had informed team management that he did not want to go to the Kings. According to Artest's agent, his original trade request was only made because he was upset when he heard rumors that the Pacers were going to trade him to the Kings for Stojaković early in the season. While not denying his agent's story, Artest did deny that he had rejected the trade to Sacramento, saying that he would play anywhere, contradicting earlier press accounts stating Artest was holding up the trade. Given conflicting accounts, it is unclear why the trade was delayed, but it was nonetheless completed on January 25 and Artest was officially sent to the Kings for Stojaković.

=== Sacramento Kings (2006–2008) ===
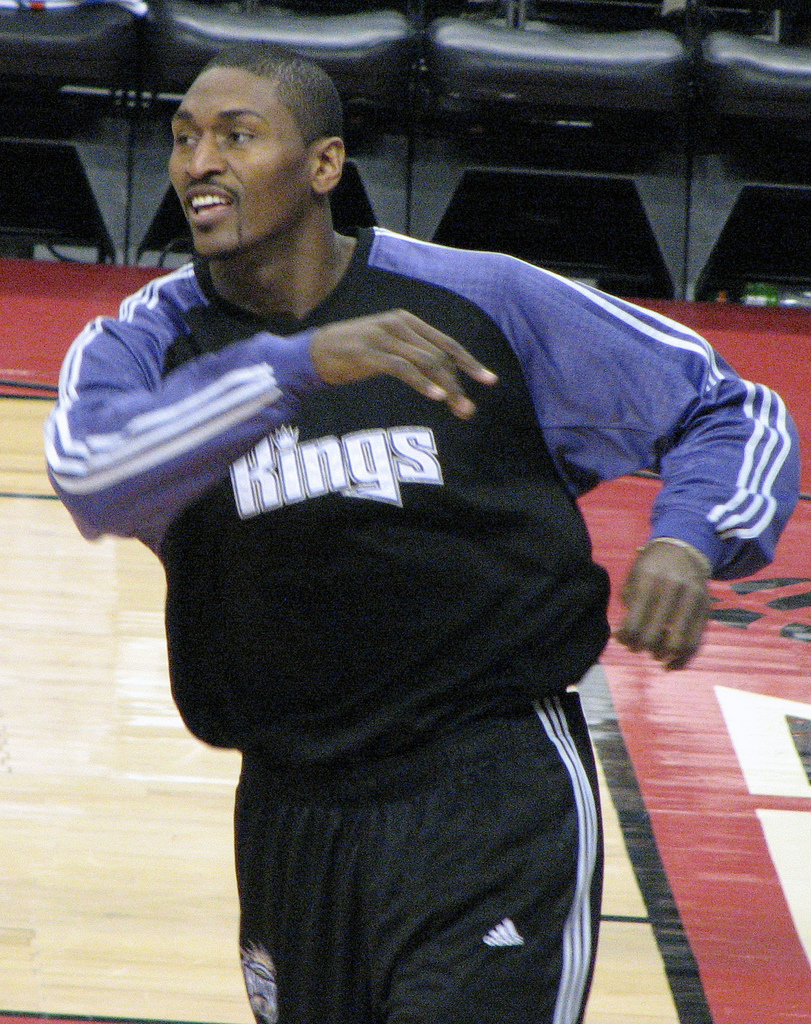
Artest during his tenure with the Sacramento Kings

Though traded midseason to the Kings franchise, Artest quickly found his place on the team by providing some much-needed defense. Though many feared his abrasive personality would be a problem, he worked well with his teammates and then-coach Rick Adelman. Artest wore #93 for his jersey number with the Kings. After acquiring Artest in late January 2006, the team immediately went on a 14–5 run, the team's best run of the season. The Kings broke .500 and landed the eighth spot in the Western Conference. This prompted ESPN to declare that "Ron Artest has breathed new life in the Sacramento Kings and enhanced their chances of reaching the playoffs for the ninth straight year." Fox Sports proclaimed, "Artest has Kings back in playoff hunt."

He was suspended for Game 2 of the team's first-round series against the San Antonio Spurs following a flagrant foul (elbow to the head) on Manu Ginóbili. The Kings eventually were eliminated from the playoffs in six games.

After the playoffs, Artest offered to donate his entire salary to keep teammate Bonzi Wells, who became a free agent after the 2005–06 NBA season, with the team. He even jokingly threatened to kill Wells if he did not re-sign with the Kings. Wells was later picked up by the Houston Rockets and then traded to the New Orleans Hornets for former Sacramento Kings player Bobby Jackson. Artest also offered to donate his salary to retain the services of head coach Rick Adelman, whose contract expired after the same season. Adelman and the Kings did not agree on a contract extension so the two parted ways.

=== Houston Rockets (2008–2009) ===
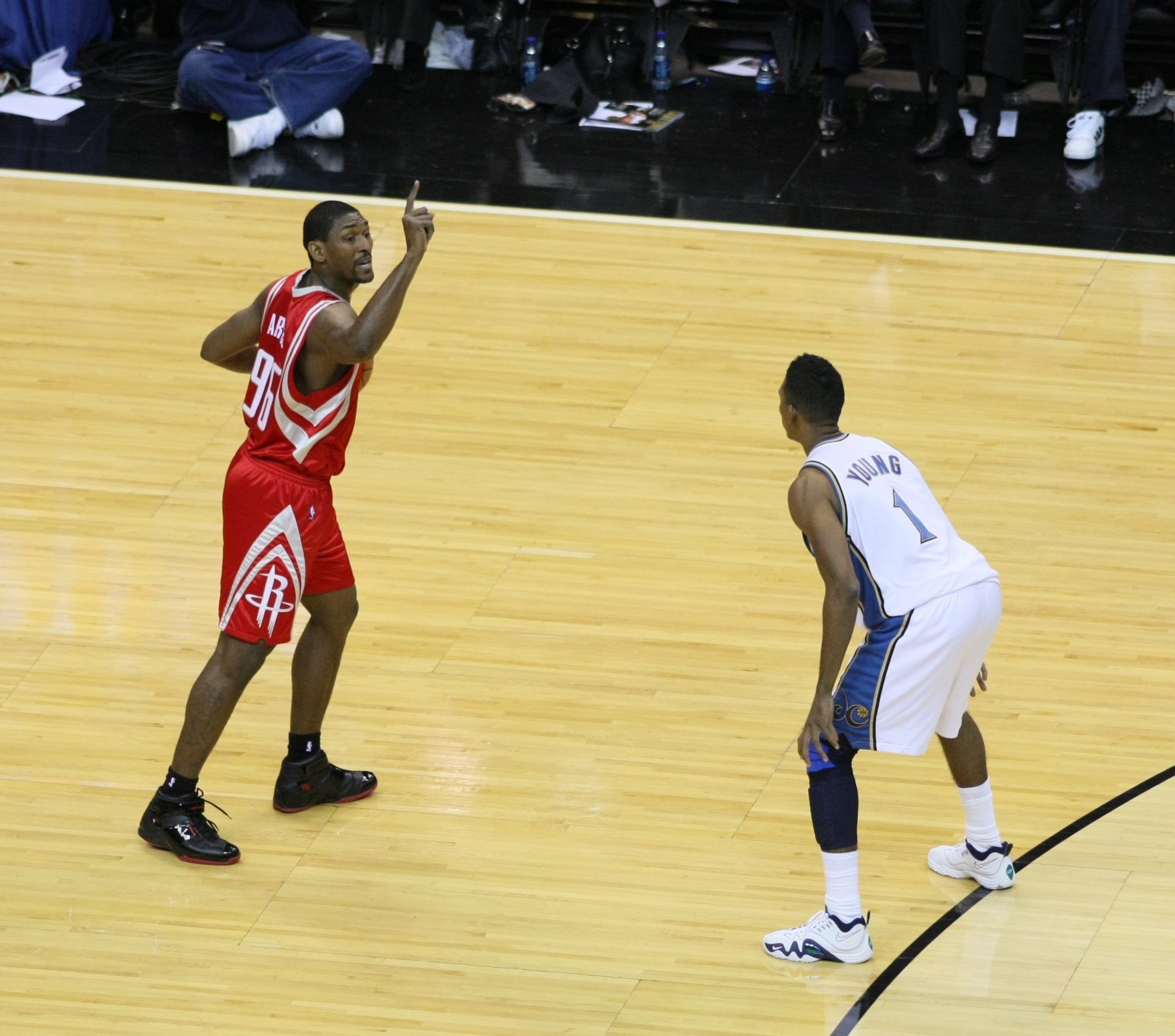
Artest playing for the Houston Rockets in the 2008–09 NBA season

On July 29, 2008, it was reported that Artest was to be traded to the Houston Rockets along with Patrick Ewing Jr. and Sean Singletary for Bobby Jackson, recently drafted forward Donté Greene, a 2009 first-round draft pick, and cash considerations. The deal was made official on August 14, due to Greene's rookie contract signing on July 14. In response to the trade, Yao Ming was generally positive, but jokingly expressed hope that Artest is "not fighting anymore and going after a guy in the stands." In response, Artest said, "This is Tracy (McGrady) and Yao's team, you know. I'm not going to take it personal. I understand what Yao said, but I'm still ghetto. That's not going to change. I'm never going to change my culture. Yao has played with a lot of black players, but I don't think he's ever played with a black player that really represents his culture as much as I represent my culture."

Artest and Yao later exchanged extensive phone calls. Artest also said, "Whatever Adelman needs me to do, whether that's come off the bench, sixth, seventh man, start, I don't even care. Whatever he needs me to do, I'm 100 percent sure it's going to work out."

On October 30, 2008, Artest received his first technical as a Houston Rocket, as he raced towards a group of Dallas Mavericks players and then quickly went to Yao Ming who bumped Josh Howard after play stopped. Artest was trying to pull Yao away from the play and to the foul line, but contact was made with Maverick players. The TNT broadcast crew felt that this technical was unwarranted and reckoned it was based upon Artest's prior reputation as a feisty player in the league. In the playoffs, Artest helped the Rockets advance past the first round for the first time in 12 seasons. In Game 2 of the second round against the Los Angeles Lakers, Artest, who was battling for rebounding position with Kobe Bryant, was elbowed in the neck by Bryant, which was later ruled to be a Type 1 flagrant foul. After being called for an offensive foul, Artest was indignant and proceeded to antagonize Bryant after the play, which eventually led to an ejection by Joe Crawford. In Game 3, Artest was again ejected in the fourth quarter after a hard foul on Pau Gasol, who was attempting to dunk on a fast-break. It was determined the next day that the foul was not serious enough to warrant an ejection, and the flagrant foul was downgraded.

=== Los Angeles Lakers (2009–2013) ===
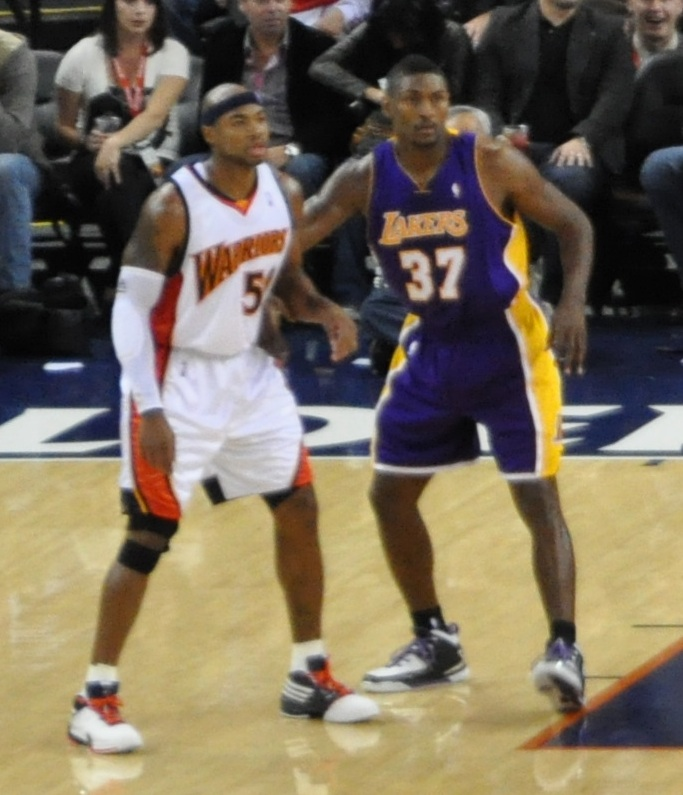
Artest guarding Corey Maggette of Golden State in 2009

==== 2009–11: Championship season ====
In July 2009, the Los Angeles Lakers signed Artest to a five-year deal worth about $33 million. Artest chose the number 37 jersey, which he said was in honor of Michael Jackson, who had died the month prior. Jackson's Thriller album was at No. 1 on the charts for 37 straight weeks.

Kobe Bryant goes up for a shot against the Phoenix Suns double team. As Bryant's shot misses, Artest, left, gets the offensive game winning putback, Game 5 of the 2010 Western Conference Finals

In Game 5 of the 2010 Western Conference Finals, Artest hit a game-winning shot at the buzzer after grabbing a last second offensive rebound. He scored 25 points against the Phoenix Suns in Game 6 and went to the NBA Finals for the first time in his career. In the finals, the Lakers defeated the Boston Celtics, four games to three. Artest scored 20 points in the clincher and sank the team's last field goal – a three-pointer late in the fourth quarter – to virtually seal the victory. Afterwards, Lakers head coach Phil Jackson called Artest the most valuable player of Game 7 against the Celtics. He won his first championship ring with the Lakers.

For the 2010–11 season, Artest switched back to number 15, his college number at St. John's and the first number he wore in his NBA career.

On April 26, 2011, Artest won the NBA's J. Walter Kennedy Citizenship Award.

==== 2011–13: Controversy and injury-riddled season ====
Artest changed his name to Metta World Peace during the offseason. He came into training camp for the 2011–12 season out of shape. Consequently, new Lakers coach Mike Brown moved him to a reserve role with reduced playing time. World Peace lamented that Brown's coaching style placed too much emphasis on statistics.

On April 22, 2012, in a game against the Oklahoma City Thunder, World Peace elbowed James Harden in the head as he was celebrating a dunk. He received a flagrant foul 2 and was immediately ejected. Harden was later found to have suffered a concussion. After the game, World Peace apologized and stated that the elbow was "unintentional." On April 24, 2012, World Peace was suspended for seven games, meaning he would miss the Lakers' season finale game against the Sacramento Kings as well as the first few games of the playoffs.

After a 1–4 start to the 2012–13 season, the Lakers fired Brown as head coach and hired Mike D'Antoni. On December 18, 2012, in a win against the Philadelphia 76ers, he grabbed a career-high 16 rebounds to add to his 19 points. On January 11, 2013, he suffered a right leg injury against the Thunder that would hamper him for two months. Around the same time, he also had an injury to his right arm that made it difficult to bend. His health worsened to the point where D'Antoni moved him off the perimeter on defense and had him guard power forwards instead. By mid-March, he was able to guard the perimeter again. On March 25, against the Golden State Warriors, World Peace tore the lateral meniscus in his left knee. He underwent surgery that was originally estimated to sideline him for six weeks. Despite the estimates, he returned 12 days after his surgery. In his absence, D'Antoni was using a reduced seven-man rotation with Kobe Bryant playing close to all 48 minutes each game. World Peace wanted to reduce his teammates' workload, if even for a few minutes, as the Lakers fought to qualify for the playoffs. The Lakers qualified for the playoffs as the seventh seed, but were swept 4–0 by San Antonio in the first round. Due to the Lakers' other injuries, World Peace played in Game 3 in spite of running with discomfort after having fluid drained from a cyst behind his surgically repaired left knee. He missed the final game of the series, and later admitted he came back too soon. For the season, he averaged his most points (12.4) since 2008–09, and shot his highest percentage (.404) since 2009–10. Still, ESPN wrote those numbers indicated that "the 33-year-old is clearly on the decline."

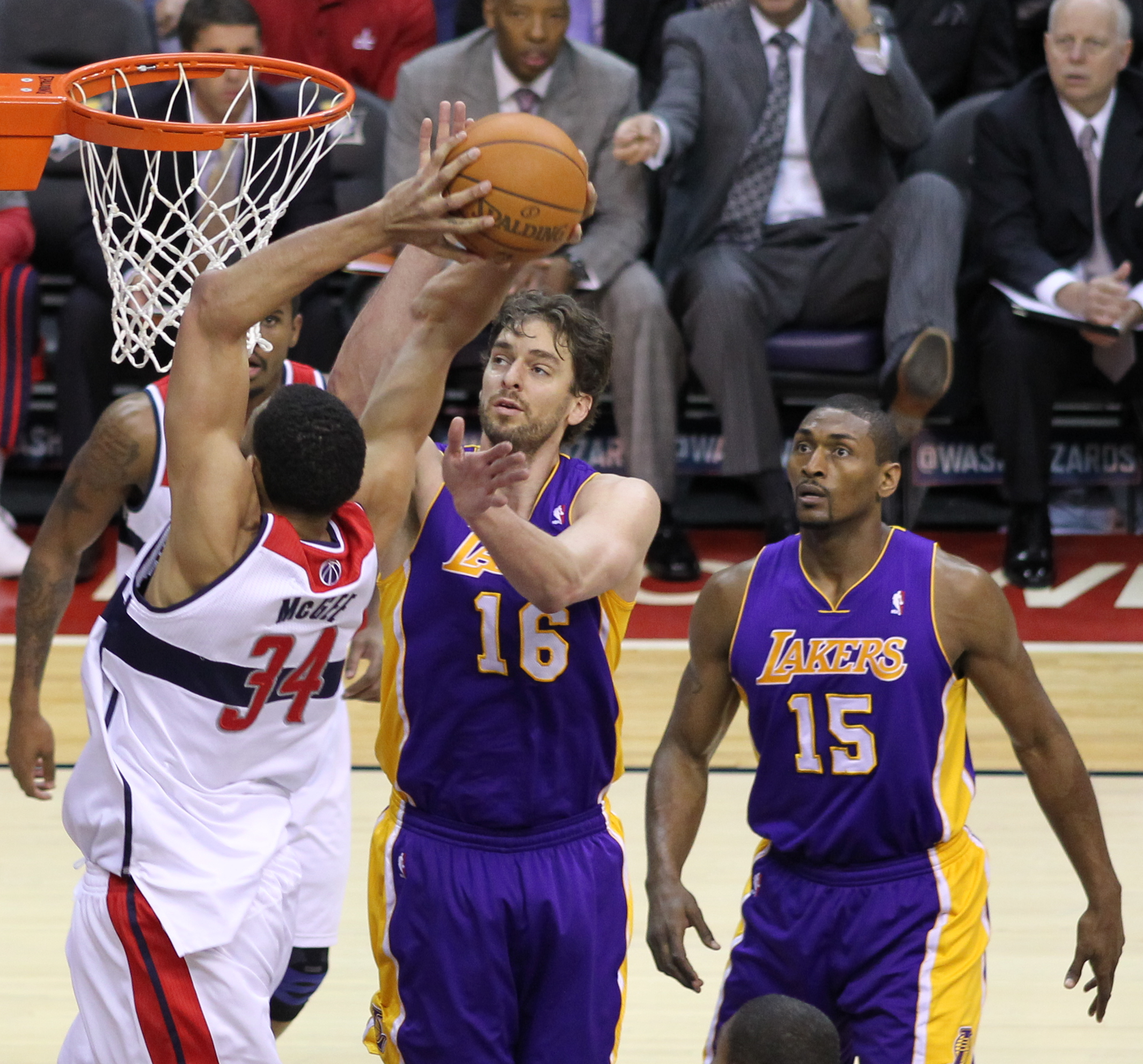
World Peace and Laker Pau Gasol against Washington's JaVale McGee in 2012

On July 11, 2013, after four seasons with the Lakers, the team waived World Peace via the amnesty clause to gain relief from the salary cap.

=== New York Knicks (2013–2014) ===
On July 16, 2013, World Peace signed a two-year deal with his hometown team the New York Knicks. On February 24, 2014, he was waived by the Knicks after they bought out his contract.

=== Sichuan Blue Whales (2014) ===
On August 4, 2014, World Peace signed with the Sichuan Blue Whales of the Chinese Basketball Association. Due to a recurrent knee injury, he was replaced on the roster in December 2014 with Daniel Orton. In 15 games, World Peace averaged 19 points, 6 rebounds and 2.3 steals per game.

=== Pallacanestro Cantù (2015) ===
On March 24, 2015, World Peace signed with Pallacanestro Cantù of Italy for the rest of the 2014–15 Lega Basket Serie A season. On May 27, 2015, in Cantù's Game 5 quarter-final loss to Reyer Venezia Mestre which ended their season, World Peace was ejected from the game and charged with five fouls after getting involved in a skirmish during the fourth quarter. In July 2015, he parted ways with the club after the two parties could not come to a new contract agreement.

=== Return to the Lakers (2015–2017) ===
On September 24, 2015, World Peace signed with the Los Angeles Lakers, returning to the franchise for a second stint. On November 6, 2015, he made his season debut in a 104–98 win over the Brooklyn Nets, playing 17 minutes with a plus-minus of 12. Teammate Kobe Bryant praised him for his impact on "everybody on the floor defensively."

On September 21, 2016, World Peace re-signed with the Lakers. On April 11, 2017, World Peace scored a team-leading 18 points in the second half to help the Lakers extend its longest winning streak in four years to five games with a 108–96 victory over the New Orleans Pelicans. He had the ball in his hands with the crowd on its feet for the Lakers' final possession in what was potentially his final game at Staples Center. During the game, he got his 1,716th and 1,717th career steals to move past Ron Harper for 22nd place in NBA history.

=== New Orleans Gators (2017) ===
During the offseason, World Peace played with the New Orleans Gators of the Global Mixed Gender Basketball (GMGB) League.

=== San Diego Kings (2019) ===
In 2019, World Peace signed a one-day contract with the San Diego Kings of the American Basketball Association to bolster their squad against the four-time defending league champion Jacksonville Giants.

== Coaching career ==
Sandiford-Artest was a player development coach in 2017–18 for the South Bay Lakers, the Los Angeles Lakers' development-league team in the G League. During the offseason in 2018, he played 3x3 basketball with the BIG3. He played under the name Ron Artest at the request of league co-founder Ice Cube, who wanted to "turn back the clock a little bit."

== NBA career statistics ==
Legend
GP	Games played	GS	Games started	MPG	Minutes per game
FG%	Field goal percentage	3P%	3-point field goal percentage	FT%	Free throw percentage
RPG	Rebounds per game	APG	Assists per game	SPG	Steals per game
BPG	Blocks per game	PPG	Points per game	**Bold**	Career high
†	Won an NBA championship	*	Led the league

=== Regular season ===
Year	Team	GP	GS	MPG	FG%	3P%	FT%	RPG	APG	SPG	BPG	PPG
1999–00	Chicago	72	63	31.1	.407	.314	.674	4.3	2.8	1.7	.5	12.0
2000–01	Chicago	76	74	31.1	.401	.291	.750	3.9	3.0	2.0	.6	11.9
2001–02	Chicago	27	26	30.5	.433	.396	.628	4.9	2.9	**2.8**	**.9**	15.6
2001–02	Indiana	28	24	29.3	.411	.215	.733	5.0	1.8	2.4	.6	10.9
2002–03	Indiana	69	67	33.6	.428	.336	.736	5.2	2.9	2.3	.7	15.5
2003–04	Indiana	73	71	37.2	.421	.310	.733	5.3	3.7	2.1	.7	18.3
2004–05	Indiana	7	7	**41.6**	**.496**	**.412**	**.922**	6.4	3.1	1.7	**.9**	**24.6**
2005–06	Indiana	16	16	37.7	.460	.333	.612	4.9	2.2	2.6	.7	19.4
2005–06	Sacramento	40	40	40.1	.383	.302	.717	5.2	**4.2**	2.0	.8	16.9
2006–07	Sacramento	70	65	37.7	.440	.358	.740	**6.5**	3.4	2.1	.6	18.8
2007–08	Sacramento	57	54	38.1	.453	.380	.719	5.8	3.5	2.3	.7	20.5
2008–09	Houston	69	55	35.5	.401	.399	.748	5.2	3.3	1.5	.3	17.1
2009–10†	L.A. Lakers	77	77	33.8	.414	.355	.688	4.3	3.0	1.4	.3	11.0
2010–11	L.A. Lakers	**82**	**82***	29.4	.397	.356	.676	3.3	2.1	1.5	.4	8.5
2011–12	L.A. Lakers	64	45	26.9	.394	.296	.617	3.4	2.2	1.1	.4	7.7
2012–13	L.A. Lakers	75	66	33.7	.403	.342	.734	5.0	1.5	1.6	.6	12.4
2013–14	New York	29	1	13.4	.397	.315	.625	2.0	.6	.8	.3	4.8
2015–16	L.A. Lakers	35	5	16.9	.311	.310	.702	2.5	.8	.6	.3	5.0
2016–17	L.A. Lakers	25	2	6.4	.279	.237	.625	.8	.4	.4	.1	2.3
Career		991	840	31.7	.414	.339	.715	4.5	2.7	1.7	.5	13.2
All-Star		1	0	17.0	.600	.000	.500	3.0	3.0	1.0	.0	7.0

=== Playoffs ===
Year	Team	GP	GS	MPG	FG%	3P%	FT%	RPG	APG	SPG	BPG	PPG
2002	Indiana	5	5	33.4	.407	**.462**	.692	6.0	3.2	**2.6**	.6	11.8
2003	Indiana	6	6	**42.0**	.389	.387	.800	5.8	2.2	2.5	1.0	**19.0**
2004	Indiana	15	15	38.9	.378	.288	.718	**6.5**	3.2	1.4	**1.1**	18.4
2006	Sacramento	5	5	39.6	.383	.333	.696	5.0	3.0	1.6	.8	17.4
2009	Houston	13	13	37.5	.394	.277	.714	4.3	**4.2**	1.1	.2	15.6
2010†	L.A. Lakers	**23**	**23**	36.5	.398	.291	.579	4.0	2.1	1.5	.5	11.2
2011	L.A. Lakers	9	9	31.9	**.443**	.321	.762	4.6	2.2	1.1	.8	10.6
2012	L.A. Lakers	6	6	39.3	.367	.389	.750	3.5	2.3	2.2	.7	11.7
2013	L.A. Lakers	3	3	28.0	.250	.143	**1.000**	3.7	1.7	.7	.3	6.0
Career		85	85	36.9	.389	.308	.714	4.8	2.8	1.5	.7	13.9

== Media presence ==
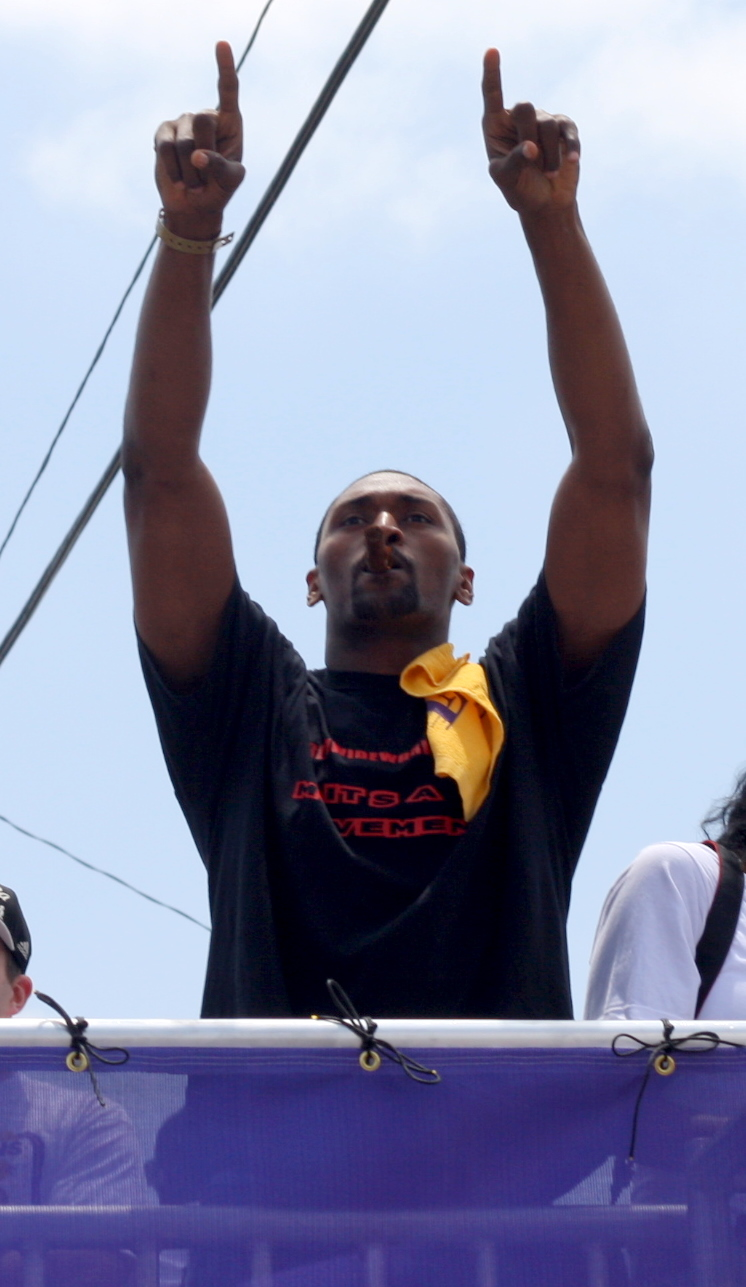
Artest celebrates at the 2010 Lakers Championship parade

=== Television ===
In April 2010, it was announced that Artest would help develop and produce his own reality show, They Call Me Crazy, in conjunction with E1 Entertainment and Tijuana Entertainment.

On December 18, 2010, an art show honoring Artest was held in Toronto, Canada. Entitled Lovable Badass, the show featured work by 30 Canadian and American artists, illustrators, painters and sculptors inspired by the athlete. Artest made a surprise appearance at the exhibition's opening night, commenting that "(the show) was definitely special. It was unexpected. Overwhelming."

Artest was part of the line-up for the thirteenth season of the reality show Dancing with the Stars, though he finished in last place, being eliminated in the show's first week.

In October 2012, he appeared as a panelist on Nickelodeon's game show Figure It Out.

In September 2013, he made the first in a recurring series of skits on the Comedy Central sketch show Key and Peele called "Metta World News," in which he plays a newscaster.

Peace competed against actor Skylar Astin in an episode of Spike's Lip Sync Battle that aired June 21, 2017. He performed Cypress Hill's "Insane in the Brain" and Katy Perry's "Roar" but did not win.

In January 2018, it was announced that World Peace was a contestant in the first American edition of Celebrity Big Brother. Metta became the fourth celebrity to be evicted from the house on Day 20. He also appeared in the second season as part of a Head of Household competition.

In 2019, he played himself in an episode of Hawaii Five-0, season 10, episode 8.

In 2023, Metta World Peace competed in season ten of The Masked Singer as the wild card contestant "Cuddle Monster" who Nick Cannon called the largest costume in this series. He was eliminated on "Trolls Night".

=== Artest Media Group ===
World Peace is the founder of the Artest Media Group. Established in 2010, the brand management company's clients include himself and music artists Vinita, Deacon, Sade Artest, Rugby, and Emmaline Cleary. Music producers Wip, Q, and Lucky are also associated with the group. On February 19, 2013, World Peace was awoken by a squad of police who received a tip there had been gun play within his property. Authorities were quick to recognize their mistake after World Peace explained that the armed individuals were actors shooting a "life on the streets"-styled movie for his group.

=== Discography ===
On October 31, 2006, Artest released a rap album entitled My World. He published the album on the Lightyear Records label under his own imprint, Tru Warier Records. The album features guest artists P. Diddy, Juvenile, Mike Jones, Big Kap, Nature and Capone.

=== Advocacy ===
He has become involved in advocacy relating to mental health issues. In December 2010, he announced that he would donate some or all of his salary for the 2011–12 NBA season toward mental health awareness charities. Artest also auctioned off his 2009–10 championship ring and donated the proceeds to various mental health charities nationwide. In 2016, he told Sports Illustrated, "Some people don't understand mental health is broad. You have to ask questions. Are you depressed? Are you schizophrenic? Do you have anxiety? Are you bipolar? Those are the different things that come under the banner of mental health."

He has posed for PETA ad campaigns encouraging people to report animal abuse and to have their pets neutered.

On March 26, 2024, Artest endorsed Robert F. Kennedy Jr.’s candidacy for the 2024 United States presidential election at a campaign event.

=== The Panda's Friend ===
Artest launched The Panda’s Friend, a clothing brand, in 2014. That same year, it was reported that Artest — then known as Metta World Peace — would be changing his name either to "The Panda's Friend" (or, alternatively, "Panda Friend") ahead of his relocation to China to compete in the CBA.

== Disciplinary and legal issues ==
=== Early career incidents ===
In a December 2009 Sporting News interview, Artest admitted he led a "wild" lifestyle as a young player, and drank Hennessy cognac in the locker room at halftime while with the Bulls. In February 2004, he wore a bathrobe over his practice uniform to a Pacers practice as "a symbolic reminder to take it easy."

Artest was suspended for three games in 2003 for destroying a TV camera at Madison Square Garden, and for four games the same year for a confrontation with Miami Heat coach Pat Riley. He was also suspended for two games early in the 2004–05 season by Pacers head coach Rick Carlisle after he allegedly asked for a month off because he was tired from promoting an R&B album for the group Allure on his Tru Warier production label, on which he released his own album, a rap recording titled My World, in October 2006.

=== The Malice at the Palace ===
On November 19, 2004, Artest was at the center of an altercation among players and fans during a game in Auburn Hills, Michigan, between Artest's Pacers and the home team Detroit Pistons.

The brawl began when Artest fouled Pistons center Ben Wallace as Wallace was putting up a shot. Wallace, upset at being fouled hard when the game was effectively over (the Pacers led 97–82 with less than 50 seconds to go), responded by shoving Artest in the face, leading to an altercation near the scorer's table. Artest walked to the sideline and laid down on the scorer's table. Reacting to Wallace throwing something at Artest, Pistons fan John Green threw a cup of Diet Coke at Artest, hitting him. Artest jumped into the front-row seats and confronted a man he incorrectly believed to be responsible, which in turn erupted into a brawl between Pistons fans and several of the Pacers. Artest returned to the basketball court, and attacked Pistons fan A.J. Shackleford, who was apparently taunting Artest verbally. This fight resulted in the game being stopped with less than a minute remaining. Artest's teammates Jermaine O'Neal and Stephen Jackson were suspended indefinitely the day after the game, along with Wallace.

On November 21, the NBA suspended Artest for the rest of the regular season, plus any playoff games. All told, Artest missed 86 games (73 regular season games plus 13 playoff games), the longest suspension for an on-court incident in NBA history. Eight other players (four Pacers and four Pistons) received suspensions, without pay, which ranged from one to thirty games in length. Each of the players involved were levied fines and ordered to do community service. Several fans were also charged and were banned from attending Pistons games for life. Artest lost approximately $5 million in salary due to the suspension.

=== Legal issues ===
On March 5, 2007, Artest was arrested for domestic violence, and excused from the Sacramento Kings indefinitely by GM Geoff Petrie. On March 10, Kings announced that Artest would return to the team, while his case was being reviewed by the Placer County District Attorney. On May 3, he was sentenced to 20 days in jail and community service. Artest spent only 10 days in the jail, as the judge stayed 10 days of the sentence, and served the remainder in a work release program. On July 14, 2007, the NBA suspended Artest for seven games at the beginning of the 2007–08 NBA season for his legal problems.

In 2007, Artest was forced to relinquish ownership of his dog, a Great Dane, for malnutrition and neglect.

== Personal life ==
=== Name change ===
On September 16, 2011, Artest officially changed his name to Metta World Peace. "Changing my name was meant to inspire and bring youth together all around the world," World Peace said in a statement released after the name change court hearing. World Peace chose the first name Metta, a traditional Buddhist word that means loving, kindness, and friendliness towards all.

=== Family ===
World Peace and Kimsha Hatfield started an on-and-off relationship when they were 15 and 14. Their first child Sadie was born in 1997. They went on to have two more children together, Ron III and Diamond, and were married from June 2003 until their divorce in 2009. Kimsha was a cast member on VH1's reality TV show Basketball Wives: LA. Ron III also became a professional basketball player. World Peace has another son, Jeron, with his former high school girlfriend Jennifer Palma. He paid for his brother to attend law school, and became a grandfather with the birth of his eldest daughter Sadie's first child.

On May 4, 2020, World Peace announced that he had changed his name once again to Metta Sandiford-Artest, combining his last name with that of his second wife, Maya Sandiford.

Sandiford-Artest has a company, The Artest Management Group, which includes a film division and a Certified Public Accountant division to assist athletes with tax preparation. He became interested in mathematics in high school and in the late 2010s he began taking analytics classes at UCLA and developing a sports app. "I’ve turned it on mentally," he said, and compared his new pursuits to the teenage years he learned basketball. In March 2023, Sandiford-Artest was announced as a partner in MOORvision Technologies and Ucam, a camera built to capture athletes' point of view during games.

== See also ==
- List of NBA career steals leaders
- List of people banned or suspended by the NBA
- World B. Free, Fat Lever and God Shammgod, other notable NBA players with unusual names similar to Metta World Peace
