= Billion Dollar Sound =

Studio album by Rich Cronin
- Released: May 16, 2008
- Recorded: 2005–2008
- Genre: Pop, pop-rock, hip hop, alternative
- Length: 66:09
- Label: Orange Freeze Records
- Producer: Rich Cronin, Joe Clapp, Tommy Cangemi, Melissa Holland

Rich Cronin chronology
Billion Dollar Sound (2008)	The Vault - Volume I (2011)

Singles from Billion Dollar Sound
- 1. "Story of My Life" Released: June 2008; 2. "Impossible" Released: December 2008

Professional ratings
Review scores
Source	Rating
Amazon	5/5 stars
iTunes	5/5 stars

Billion Dollar Sound is the first and only studio solo album by former / late LFO vocalist, Rich Cronin. The album was released on May 16, 2008. The album was three years in the making and includes music which chronicles his journey from "Summer Girls" to now. The label of the album is Orange Freeze Records; Cronin wrote many of the songs on the album.

== Track listing ==
1. "This Year" – 4:26 Rich Cronin, Thomas Cangemi, Jos Clapp
2. "Impossible" – 3:34
3. "Hey Radio" – 4:13
4. "Watch Your Dance" – 3:13
5. "Story of My Life" – 3:18
6. "The Only One" – 3:29
7. "Wish" – 4:14
8. "Waiting Outside" – 3:56
9. "Holiday Inn" – 3:20
10. "Blur" – 3:35
11. "Nothing Last Forever" – 4:12
12. "Tara Reid" – 2:46
13. "On Your Side" – 4:01 Rich Cronin, Thomas Cangemi, Jos Clapp
14. "Star" – 3:27
15. "Great Mistake" – 4:11 Rich Cronin, Thomas Cangemi, Jos Clapp
16. "Little Sister" – 3:33 Rich Cronin, Thomas Cangemi, Jos Clapp
17. "The Kill" – 2:48
18. "New York City Girls" – 3:53
