= Underground Productions, Inc. =

American music production company

- Founded: 1990
- Founder: Dow Brain, Brad Young
- Headquarters: Boston, Massachusetts, United States
- Area served: Music production

Underground Productions, Inc. is a Boston, Massachusetts, United States, based music production company that has been operating since 1990.

The company was founded by Dow Brain and Brad Young whose credits include writing and producing five Billboard certified Platinum and Gold albums and singles. Their work also includes writing and producing the number one selling single “Summer Girls”, recorded by LFO on Arista Records.

Underground's publishing arm B.U.M.P. has had over 500 music placements in films and television series. Selected television credits include: The Sopranos, America's Funniest Videos, Melrose Place, The District, MTV's Making the Band, The Oprah Winfrey Show, Scrubs and Weeds. Selected film credits include: Amreeka, Funny Money, Soul Men and Marci X.
