= LFO (album) =

Studio album by LFO
- Released: August 24, 1999
- Genre: Pop; pop-rap; R&B
- Length: 51:35
- Label: Arista; Trans Continental; BMG
- Producer: Dow Brain; S. Costa; Rich Cronin; Cutfather & Joe; Dakari; Full Force; Jamahl Harris; Steve Kipner; Lou Pearlman (exec.); Stargate; TQ; Brad Young

LFO chronology
LFO (1999)	Life is Good (2001)

Singles from LFO
- 1. "Can't Have You" Released: October 13, 1998; 2. "Summer Girls" Released: June 29, 1999; 3. "Girl on TV" Released: November 2, 1999; 4. "I Don't Wanna Kiss You Goodnight" Released: March 21, 2000; 5. "West Side Story" Released: July 18, 2000

Professional ratings
Review scores
Source	Rating
AllMusic	2.5/5 stars
Robert Christgau	(choice cut)

LFO is the debut album by American pop group LFO. It was released on August 24, 1999, under Arista Records.

== Track listing ==
Standard version
No.	Title	Writer(s)	Producer(s)	Length
1.	"Summer Girls"	Rich Cronin; Brad Young; Dow Brain	Cronin; Young; Brain	4:18
2.	"Girl on TV"	Cronin; Young; Brain	Cronin; Young; Brain	4:08
3.	"Cross My Heart"	Steve Kipner; David Kopatz	Cutfather & Joe; Kipner	4:30
4.	"Can't Have You" (featuring Kayo)	Barry Gibb; Robin Gibb; Maurice Gibb; Cronin; Brain; Young; Dakari; Wayne Garfield; Mauro Malavasi; David Romani	Cronin; Brain; S. Costa; Young; Dakari; Stargate^{[a]}	4:03
5.	"I Don't Wanna Kiss You Goodnight"	Dane DeViller; Sean Hosein; Kipner; D. Zero	Cutfather & Joe	4:06
6.	"West Side Story"	Cronin; Young; Brain	Cronin; Young; Brain	3:29
7.	"Think About You"	Kipner; Greg Curtis	Cutfather & Joe	3:57
8.	"I Will Show You Mine"	DeViller; Hosein; Kipner	Cutfather & Joe	3:33
9.	"All I Need to Know"	Full Force; L'Shawn	Full Force	3:50
10.	"Baby Be Mine"	Dakari; Cronin; Jimmy Jam & Terry Lewis	Dakari	3:53
11.	"Your Heart Is Safe with Me"	Diane Warren	Cutfather & Joe	3:51
12.	"My Block"	Terence Quaites; Leon Haywood; George Brown; Robert Bell; Ronald Bell; Claydes Smith; James Taylor; Earl Toon; Dennis Thomas; Meekaaeel Muhammad	TQ; Jamahl Harris^{[b]}	3:27
13.	"Forever"	Quaites; James Jacobsen	TQ; Harris^{[b]}	4:16

US re-issue version (bonus tracks)
No.	Title	Writer(s)	Producer(s)	Length
14.	"The Reason Why"	Arnthor Birgisson; Christian Karlsson; Patrick Tucker; Cronin	Bloodshy
15.	"Me (Boom, Shalak, Lak, Boom)"	Karlsson; Dakari; Tucker; Cronin	Bloodshy

Notes

- "Can't Have You" contains elements of "The Glow of Love", written by Wayne Garfield, Mauro Malavasi and David Romani.
- "Baby Be Mine" contains replayed elements of "Human", written by Jimmy Jam & Terry Lewis.
- "My Block" contains replayed elements of "She's a Bad Mama Jama", written by Leon Haywood. Contains re-sung elements of "Ladies' Night", written by George Brown, Robert Bell, Ronald Bell, Claydes Smith, James Taylor, Earl Toon, Dennis Thomas and Meekaaeel Muhammad.
- ^a signifies remix and additional production
- ^b signifies a co-producer

== Charts ==
=== Weekly charts ===
Chart (1999)	Peak position
Scottish Albums (OCC)	96
UK Albums (OCC)	62
US Billboard 200	21

=== Year-end charts ===
Chart (1999)	Position
US Billboard 200	188
Chart (2000)	Position
US Billboard 200	77

== Certifications and sales ==
Region	Certification	Certified units/sales
Canada (Music Canada)	Gold	50,000^{^}
United States (RIAA)	Platinum	1,000,000^{^}
Summaries
Worldwide	—	1,400,000
^{^} Shipments figures based on certification alone.
