= Tijuana Entertainment =

American television production company

Tijuana Entertainment is a production company formed by Troy Searer and John Foy.

Originally signed by VH1 on a first-look deal, the pair was behind Celebreality shows Shooting Sizemore, Breaking Bonaduce, Supergroup, and Mission Man Band.

Searer and Foy's credits also include The Biggest Loser and Beauty and the Geek for NBC.

== Management positions ==
- Troy Searer
- John Foy
- Wally Parks (Vice president of production)
- David Gross (Senior vice president, development)
- Angela Solis (Executive in charge of production)

== Programs ==
| Year | Title | Notes |
|---|---|---|
| 2005 | Breaking Bonaduce | |
| 2007 | Shooting Sizemore | |
| 2007 | Mission Man Band | |
| 2009-2010 | Obsessed | broadcast by A&E |
| 2010 | Strange Days with Bob Saget | broadcast by A&E |
| 2011 | I’m Heavy | broadcast by A&E |
