= Girl on TV =

1999 single by LFO

Single by LFO

from the album LFO
- Released: November 2, 1999
- Length: 4:08
- Label: Arista, Logic
- Songwriters: Brad Young, Dow Brain, Rich Cronin
- Producers: Brad Young, Dow Brain, Rich Cronin

LFO singles chronology
"Summer Girls" (1999)	"Girl on TV" (1999)	"I Don't Wanna Kiss You Goodnight" (2000)

Audio sample
- A sample from "Girl on TV" by LFO: file; help

"Girl on TV" is a song written and performed by American boy band LFO. It was released in November 1999 from their debut album, LFO (1999). The song peaked at number 10 on the US Billboard Hot 100 and number six in the United Kingdom, where it is their highest-charting hit. "Girl on TV" was certified gold by the Recording Industry Association of America (RIAA) in December 1999 for the shipment of over 500,000 copies in the US. This was the band's first single to feature Devin Lima on lead vocals.

== Background ==
Band member Rich Cronin began dating actress Jennifer Love Hewitt in 1999 after meeting her backstage at the Blockbuster Entertainment Awards. Cronin wrote "Girl on TV" about Hewitt, and she also appeared in the music video, directed by Gregory Dark.

== Track listings ==
US CD and cassette single

1. "Girl on TV" – 4:07
2. "Girl on TV" (instrumental) – 4:07
3. "All I Need to Know" – 3:49

UK CD single

1. "Girl on TV" – 4:08
2. "Girl on TV" (James Khari's Nimble mix) – 4:32
3. "Girl on TV" (interactive track)

UK cassette single

1. "Girl on TV" – 4:08
2. "Summer Girls" – 4:17

European and Australian CD single

1. "Girl on TV" (radio edit) – 4:07
2. "Girl on TV" (Bassment Flip remix) – 5:02
3. "Girl on TV" (Radio Vibe remix) – 4:07
4. "Girl on TV" (Jan & Junes club remix) – 4:41
5. "Girl on TV" (James Khari's Nimble remix) – 4:33

== Charts ==
=== Weekly charts ===
Chart (1999–2000)	Peak position
Canada Top Singles (RPM)	39
Europe (Eurochart Hot 100)	30
Germany (GfK)	80
Ireland (IRMA)	20
Scottish Singles Sales (Official Charts)	5
UK Singles (Official Charts)	6
UK Airplay (Music Week)	43
US Billboard Hot 100	10
US Mainstream Top 40 (Billboard)	26

=== Year-end charts ===
Chart (2000)	Position
UK Singles (OCC)	130
US Billboard Hot 100	93

== Certifications ==
Region	Certification	Certified units/sales
United States (RIAA)	Gold	500,000^{^}
^{^} Shipments figures based on certification alone.

== Release history ==
Region	Date	Format(s)	Label(s)	Ref.
United States	November 2, 1999	CD; cassette	Arista	
Canada	November 2, 1999	CD	Arista	
United Kingdom	January 24, 2000	CD; cassette	Arista; Logic	
