= Life Is Good (LFO album) =

Life is Good

Studio album by LFO
- Released: June 26, 2001
- Genres: Pop-rap; pop rock; R&B
- Length: 61:26
- Label: J
- Producers: Ken Gioia; Sheppard Gioia; Pop Rox; Rich Cronin (also exec.); Dow Brain; Rick Nowels; Wayne Rodrigues; Brad Young; Tom Cangemi

LFO chronology
LFO (1999)	Life is Good (2001)

Singles from Lyte Funky Ones
- 1. "Every Other Time" Released: August 27, 2001; 2. "Life Is Good" Released: January 15, 2002

Professional ratings
Review scores
Source	Rating
AllMusic	2/5 stars
Entertainment Weekly	A−
Robert Christgau	(2-star Honorable Mention)
Rolling Stone	2.5/5 stars

Life Is Good is the second and final album released by the American pop group LFO in 2001 on J Records. It reached #75 on the Billboard 200.

The song "6 Minutes" would go on to get a cover version by the American pop rock band Jonas Brothers on their 2006 release It's About Time.

Nicole Richie recorded a demo of the song "Dandelion," which leaked online in 2006. It, along with a reportedly 10-track album she was recording around the same time, have never been officially released.

By the end of 2001 the album had sold only 282,000 copies which is well below the 1.49 million their 1999 self-titled debut had sold.

== Background ==
Arista Records founder Clive Davis would leave the label in the spring of 2000, and would immediately create another label called J Records, where he would take LFO with him to the new label.

After their Platinum-selling debut album, the group went to work on their second album, but were insistent on proving to people that they were not a boyband, despite their manager Lou Pearlman pushing them in that direction. They wanted the album to change the inaccurate perception of being a manufacture boyband, and wanted credibility. Rich Cronin described the disc as "a little bit of rock, a little funk, and a lot of hip-hop". Inspiration for the album is also The Cars, and Green Day, in addition to hip-hop.

Groups M.O.P. and De la Soul liked their prior music, where they ended up on the album. The latter group's manager approached Rich to schedule a meeting, which took place, and the group agreed after hearing a track called "Rap Star" (which did not make it onto the album). De la Soul appear on the song "Alayna". M.O.P reached out to Cronin, causing them to be on a 16-bar rap on the track "Life Is Good".

The group saw the album underperforming mainly as a result of Napster, "We were projecting 150-200,000, in that range. It did like 60,000. We were like, wow, the Napster effect is real".

The group would break up in 2002, where according to Fishetti, "We didn’t really end on good terms, to be honest. When we walked out of that room in 2002, it was like a weight was lifted off of our shoulders. We had worked together for so long…basically nonstop. When you live and work so closely with people, you’re bound to develop boundaries and barriers, and if you don’t break ‘em down, if you don’t work on ‘em, they just continue to grow. Before you know it, the only time you’re actually corresponding with each other is for the 45 minutes you’re on stage, and that’s pretty much where it got to".

== Track listing ==
No.	Title	Writer(s)	Length
1.	"Every Other Time"	Rich Cronin; Ken Gioia; Sheppard Goodman	4:07
2.	"Twenty-Eight Days"	Cronin; Sam Hollander; Dave Schommer	3:55
3.	"Six Minutes"	Joseph Belmaati; Cronin; Mich Hansen; Gioia; Goodman	3:10
4.	"Alayna" (featuring De La Soul)	Dow Brain; Cronin; Dave; Maseo; Posdnos	4:33
5.	"Erase Her"	Cronin; Rick Nowels	4:24
6.	"Dandelion"	Cronin; Nowels; Wayne Rodrigues	4:39
7.	"Life Is Good" (featuring M.O.P.)	Billy Danze; Cronin; Gioia; Goodman; Lil' Fame	4:05
8.	"Where You Are"	Cronin; Hollander; Schommer	4:01
9.	"What If"	Brain; Cronin; Young	3:34
10.	"If I Had a Dollar"	Brain; Cronin; Devin Lima; Young	4:24
11.	"Gravity"	Brain; Cronin; Young	3:52
12.	"That's the Way It Is"	Cronin; Gioia; Goodman	3:50
13.	"The Sun Still Shines"	Brain; Cronin; Lima; Young	4:32
14.	"Dandelion" (featuring Kelis)	Cronin; Nowels; Rodrigues	4:38
15.	"If I Learn to Fly"	Rich Cronin; Rick Nowels; Kenny Gioia	3.22
16.	"Suzie's Pillow"	Rick Bailey; Colin Cobb; Brad Fischetti	3:33
Total length:			61:26

- "Suzie's Pillow" is a hidden track and begins with ten minutes and one second of silence.

== Charts ==
Chart (2001)	Peak position
US Billboard 200	75
