= Shooting Sizemore =

- Genre: Reality
- Starring: Tom Sizemore
- Country of origin: United States
- No. of seasons: 1
- No. of episodes: 6

Production
- Executive producers: John Foy; Troy Searer; Sholom Gelt
- Production company: Tijuana Entertainment

Original release
- Network: VH1
- Release: January 7 – February 18, 2007

Shooting Sizemore is an American reality documentary television series that debuted January 7, 2007 on VH1. The series follows Tom Sizemore as he overcomes his addiction and gets his life, along with his career, back to the way it was. It also showed Sizemore as he worked to settle the demons of his past.

== Episodes ==
No.	Title	Original release date
1	"Clean and Sobering"	January 7, 2007
2	"Holy Quit"	January 14, 2007
3	"Manic Panic"	January 21, 2007
4	"One Small Step"	January 28, 2007
5	"Stumbling"	February 11, 2007
6	"The End of the Beginning"	February 18, 2007
