= Summer Girls =

1999 single by LFO

Single by LFO

from the album LFO
- B-side: "Can't Have You"
- Released: June 29, 1999
- Length: 4:17
- Label: Arista
- Songwriters: Rich Cronin; Dow Brain; Brad Young
- Producers: Dow Brain; Brad Young

LFO singles chronology
"Sex U Up (The Way You Like It)" (1997)	"Summer Girls" (1999)	"Girl on TV" (1999)

"Summer Girls" is a song by American pop group LFO. It was released on June 29, 1999, as the lead single from their debut album, LFO (1999). "Summer Girls" reached number three on the US Billboard Hot 100 chart and was certified platinum by the Recording Industry Association of America (RIAA). In 2010, Billboard magazine named it the 14th-biggest summer song of all time. In 2019, Billboard also ranked the song the 43rd-greatest song of 1999. This was the band's first single to feature Devin Lima as a member of the group after original member Brian "Brizz" Gillis left the group.

== Background and content ==
The song was written by Rich Cronin, Dow Brain, and Brad Young. Cronin said the song included numerous inside jokes, and that he never anticipated its success. He claimed this was because the song was made strictly for a demo tape, but was leaked to WWZZ, a top 40 radio station in Washington, D.C. Radio station Program Director Dale O'Brien received an unmixed copy of the song from Kelly Schweinsberg, GM of LFO's initial label, Logic Records. He listened to it a few days later, his "jaw dropped, and the song was added in a hot second."

== Music video ==
The music video was directed by Marcus Raboy and was released on July 20, 1999. It was filmed at Coney Island in New York.

== Track listings ==
US CD and cassette single; Australian CD single

1. "Summer Girls" – 4:17
2. "Summer Girls" (instrumental) – 4:17
3. "Can't Have You" – 4:02

European CD single

1. "Summer Girls" – 4:17
2. "Summer Girls" (instrumental) – 4:17

UK cassette single

1. "Summer Girls" – 4:17
2. "Can't Have You" – 4:02

UK CD1

1. "Summer Girls" – 4:17
2. "Summer Girls" (instrumental) – 4:17
3. "Summer Girls" (video) – 4:17

UK CD2

1. "Summer Girls" – 4:17
2. "Can't Have You" – 4:02
3. "Summer Girls" (instrumental) – 4:17

== Charts ==
=== Weekly charts ===
Chart (1999)	Peak position
Australia (ARIA)	71
Canada Top Singles (RPM)	18
Canada CHR (Nielsen BDS)	16
Europe (Eurochart Hot 100)	52
Europe (European Hit Radio)	30
Germany (GfK)	56
Netherlands (Dutch Top 40 Tipparade)	12
Netherlands (Single Top 100)	79
New Zealand (Recorded Music NZ)	14
Scottish Singles Sales (Official Charts)	26
Sweden (Sverigetopplistan)	36
UK Singles (Official Charts)	16
UK Airplay (Music Week)	21
US Billboard Hot 100	3
US Mainstream Top 40 (Billboard)	18
US Rhythmic Top 40 (Billboard)	29

=== Year-end charts ===
Chart (1999)	Position
US Billboard Hot 100	38
US Mainstream Top 40 (Billboard)	68

== Certifications ==
Region	Certification	Certified units/sales
United States (RIAA)	Platinum	1,300,000

== Release history ==
Region	Date	Format(s)	Label(s)	Ref.
United States	June 29, 1999	CD	Arista	
United Kingdom	September 6, 1999	CD; cassette	Arista	
