= Breaking Bonaduce =

American reality television series

- Also known as: My Reality TV Breakdown
- Created by: Kim Rozenfeld
- Directed by: Mark Jacobs
- Starring: Danny Bonaduce; Gretchen Bonaduce
- Country of origin: United States
- Original language: English
- No. of seasons: 2
- No. of episodes: 19

Production
- Executive producers: Danny Bonaduce; Gretchen Bonaduce; Michael Hirschorn; Jeff Krask; Brandon Riegg; Troy Searer
- Producers: Steve Pilot; Steve Youel
- Running time: 22–24 minutes
- Production companies: 3Ball Productions; VH1

Original release
- Network: VH1
- Release: September 11, 2005 – December 17, 2006

Breaking Bonaduce is an American reality television series that aired on VH1, focusing on former child-actor Danny Bonaduce, and how his (then-) increasingly unstable lifestyle impacted his then-wife, Gretchen, and their two children. The series premiered in September 2005 and ended in December 2006.

== Overview ==
The series focused on the problems and events that had led Bonaduce, speaking retrospectively, to consider his life a "car crash". Over the course of filming, Bonaduce's previously publicized abuse of drugs resumes; an initially successful effort to replace that unhealthy behavior with overzealous exercise/bodybuilding backfires (as he falls into experimenting with performance-enhancing drugs, in order to "chase" the endorphin "rush" that overexercising gives him); and, later attempts suicide. He also makes periodic attempts to save his crumbling marriage by attending couple's counseling with his wife, Gretchen (who, over the course of the series, evolves from being Danny's constant enabler/excuse-maker, to filing for divorce after Bonaduce's dangerous antics finally push her too far).

In the United Kingdom, the series is known as My Reality TV Breakdown. Throughout Latin America, it is known as Destrozando a Bonaduce which translates as Destroying Bonaduce.

This show was produced by 3Ball Productions, and directed by Mark Jacobs.

== Critical response ==
The series was both celebrated and criticized for making voyeuristic entertainment of a seemingly "no limits"-style documentation of Bonaduce's mounting—and generally self-inflicted—misfortunes. A review in Variety magazine said, "...It's hard to imagine a shower long enough to wash away the experience of simply viewing the show, much less having produced, programmed or participated in it."

== Episodes ==
=== Season 1 ===
Episode	Title	Summary
1	"Danny Had an Affair"	Gretchen & Danny have turned to couples therapy to begin repairing the damage caused by an infidelity. The discussions are not one-sided, however: Gretchen's (perceived) decreased lack of physical affection towards Danny, is implied to have been a driving force behind Danny's adultery. At this fragile point in their relationship, Danny Bonaduce, ex-"child star", is booked to perform stand-up comedy at The Palms Casino in Las Vegas. This raises dangerous stakes: Can a recovering alcoholic/drug abuser who has just cheated on his wife, be trusted to behave properly while 'unsupervised' in "Sin City"? Danny's answer: to behave in some of the riskiest ways imaginable, believing that if he flirt with disaster without succumbing to Vegas' obvious temptations, he can resist them anywhere else—for life—too. Danny proves worthy of this challenge, pulling himself out of a world of flowing booze and all-too-receptive women, to drive home to his wife in the middle of the night.
2	"Dangerous Behavior"	Things appear to be on the mend in the Bonaduce household, as the family is functioning normally once again. But beneath the surface, trouble is brewing. Danny has plunged himself head-first into physical fitness, nutritional supplements, and body sculpting as a 'positive' substitute for his propensity toward destructive behaviors/substances. He has even become a licensed personal trainer. However, Danny finds himself falling back into old urges and habits. By taking on clients who are exclusively young, pretty women—and, experimenting with anabolic steroids to maximize his physique—Danny is once again showing an inability to get out of his own way.
3	"Anger Management"	It doesn't take their therapist, Dr. Garry, long to realize that Danny has a major problem with anger-control. In fact, it's clear that he embraces running, body building, and even karate lessons in an effort to positively channel some of his excess angst. But during a therapy session in which Gretchen reveals a secret about an innocent, funny photo she's taken with a male member of her band, Danny's jealousy and anger boil over, and he storms out of the session. In the coming days, Danny struggles to maintain a normal routine, all the while knowing he will confront the bandmate at Gretchen's next gig. Dr. Garry warns Danny that any aggressive move will only serve to push Gretchen further away from him. However, on the night of the band's next performance (before a packed house), Danny decides to pull the guy off the stage in the middle of their set and verbally assault him. Ultimately, his inability to exercise any semblance of self-control leaves even Danny wondering if his marriage is in serious trouble.
4	"No Time for Love"	Danny's past behavior has forced Gretchen to build a self-defending, emotional "wall" around herself that prevents the two from recovering any of the deep intimacy from the early days of their marriage. She keeps herself very busy with the kids, the house, errands and the plans for her 40th birthday party. Danny struggles to cope with Gretchen's seemingly cold and distant demeanor, until his fear and pain send him into a fit of binge drinking and other destructive behaviors. On the night of Gretchen's all-girl slumber party, Danny decides to go out with friends and drink until he blacks out. But when he finds out that male strippers are part of Gretchen's party plans, Danny demands a halt to production of the show until he can get his wife on the phone to discuss the strippers. As Danny is stewing, the show fades to black ... "to be continued".
5	"Out of Control"	When we left Danny on the streets of Hollywood, he was ringing Gretchen's cell phone "off-the-hook", trying to demand that she not have male strippers at her 40th birthday party with her female friends. When he finally gets her on the phone, she refuses to allow him to dictate what she can and can't do at her own party. In a huff, Gretchen practically hangs up on him. Moments later, Danny has a volcanically violent outburst of blind rage. He begins physically menacing the show's production crew, threatening to go to the party and assault people if they allow the strippers to perform. After several hours of erratic and violent behavior, Danny eventually breaks down in tears, confessing that he's completely lost control of his mind and life. Later that evening, in a cry for help, Danny slashes his wrists. The next day, in a final act of madness, Danny accuses Dr. Garry of conspiring with Gretchen against him.
6	"Leaving Los Angeles"	As Danny spends another night drinking himself to sleep, Gretchen sneaks off to therapy for answers. She reveals to Dr. Garry that the drinking, steroids, and painkillers have taken control of Danny and her house has turned upside down. Dr. Garry confronts Danny off-camera, demanding that he check into rehab. Danny reluctantly agrees. But before entering, he decides to tattoo his first day of sobriety onto his arm as a gesture of his commitment to get well. Danny explains to his children that he must go away to get well, but loves them and will return. As Gretchen drives away from the rehab center, leaving Danny standing alone in front of it, they both wear facial expressions of impending doom.
7	"Tough Love"	In the first weeks of treatment, the rehab team attempts to get Danny to a healthier place—physically and mentally. Breathing exercises, yoga, spiritual-counseling—anything to get him to slow his mind down. But predictably, Danny is resisting the program. Fits and tantrums stunt his early progress. Eventually, Danny begins to warm up to some of their more `new age' methods, and attempts to behave. But when the facility decides it's time to bring Gretchen in for a couples exercise, Danny becomes enraged with Gretchen's lack of trust in him, and threatens to quit rehab.
8	"Daddy's Girl"	When we last saw Danny, he was storming away from a couples exercise and threatening to leave rehab. Danny doesn't want to be at rehab, and if Gretchen isn't going to trust him regardless of what he does, why stay? Gretchen begs him to stay for the sake of their marriage. Her reinforcement of their commitment sparks a change in Danny. In the coming weeks, he begins to show real signs of progress. Eventually, the rehab staff feels he's ready to see his children. This comes not a moment too soon for Isabella, who's been acting up and acting out because of how much she misses her dear daddy. When the two see each other for the first time in weeks, Danny vows that he will never leave her for thirty days again. And to Gretchen, he makes a solemn vow to become a better husband and father.
9	"Home Alone"	After 30 days of rehabilitation, Danny seems like a new man. He's sober, reflective, and feeling equipped to return home. But, for the first time in months, Danny is in a position to examine his marriage with a clear eye. He concludes that at its core, their relationship is a union between two very different people with conflicting romantic and sexual appetites. Coupled with his already fragile state of mind, this revelation leads Danny to portend troubled waters ahead.
10	"Party of One"	Danny and Gretchen are both struggling to understand each other's respective 'language of love'. Danny craves overt, passionate gestures of affection; however, Gretchen feels silly when romance gets sappy. At one point, Gretchen cavalierly chides him that maybe he should "be with someone else." This seemingly minor 'infraction' results in perceived betrayal, rejection, and, an overreaction: Danny moves out.
11	"Danny's from Venus"	On the verge of moving out of his home and possibly leaving his wife, Danny realizes that he has a great life that is worth keeping; but, the small thing that's missing is just so important. Dr. Garry tries to impress upon Danny—one last time—that Gretchen is just simply not the woman Danny wants her to be. Still unconvinced, Danny has high hopes for his Father's Day present from her. But true to form, Gretchen botches the romantic element of it, again. After a bout of anger, Danny finally realizes that Gretchen can't speak his romantic/emotional 'language' -- and, that it's unfair for him to keep asking her to. Will they now live happily—but separately—ever after?

=== Season 2 ===
Episode	Title	Summary
1	"El Gringo Loco"	At the onset of season two, we see the impact that 'Breaking Bonaduce' has had on Danny and Gretchen's lives. In fact, the show is successful enough to get international distribution. So in order to keep the momentum of the show's popularity moving forward, Danny agrees to help promote the show in Mexico City. On his trip, he visits a dubbing house where 'Breaking Bonaduce is translated into Spanish. But because Danny had never seen the show prior to this, after viewing the episode in which Gretchen has strippers at her birthday party, Danny goes into a psychological tailspin.
2	"Aching Bonaduce"	Danny begins acting manic and belligerent in reaction to seeing an episode of the show for the first time, in Mexico. Because of this, Dr. Garry refuses to continue therapy with him, and Gretchen decides to ban him from their house. Danny is spiraling down fast. As he hits rock bottom, his Alcoholics Anonymous group stages an intervention, accusing him of relapse behavior. Danny's sponsor, Jason, forces Danny to take a drug test, and refuses to leave his side for 72 hours. During this time, Danny vents his frustrations to his consoling friend, while Gretchen does her best to calm her deeply concerned children.
3	"Honorary Degrees of Separation"	Danny has been out of the house for a while when he gets the news that he's been awarded 'Harvard Lampoon's Man of the Year'. Ironically enough, Valentine's Day is his first opportunity to ask Gretchen to come with him to Boston, despite their marital troubles. Gretchen has mixed emotions, but eventually agrees. Initially, things go well at Harvard. In fact, the Bonaduces' appear to be on-course for reconciliation. But when Gretchen (still afraid of being emotionally hurt by Danny, yet again) refuses to sleep with Danny the night he accepts his award, this perceived rejection sends Danny into a tirade that leaves Gretchen feeling like her only option is to file for divorce.
4	"Prescription Strength"	Back in Los Angeles, Danny is as frightened as he's ever been that he's going to lose his family because of his behavior. This sobering thought leads him back to his psychiatrist, to get his medication levels checked and updated. But even with Danny's attempts to manage his bipolar disorder episodes, Gretchen is still one step from filing divorce papers. Danny decides his only option is to work his way back into her good graces by easing her parental duties by spending much-needed time with their children.
5	"Anti Chamber"	Gretchen has seen steady progress in Danny over the past few weeks. So she offers him a 'probationary period' of return to the house—provided he's willing to stay in their guest room. Danny is concerned about how this will reflect on him, to their kids. Right on cue, after only a few nights, Isabella accuses him of becoming 'soft'. Thrown by this development, Danny decides to get in the boxing ring with a professional, heavyweight contender, to prove to himself that he hasn't become 'weak'. Unfortunately, even though the heavyweight beats him silly, his dissatisfaction with the guest room grows stronger. With nowhere to turn, Danny begins a search for God.
6	"Stir Crazy for You"	Danny is unhappy about being relegated to the guest room of his own house, and is beginning to go stir crazy in his little 'cell'. At the same time, he realizes that his own actions have led to this situation. So, Danny continues his parental duties, and even agrees to baby-sit while Gretchen has a ladies-night-out—all in hopes of getting out of the guest room. A further visit to their pastor for a re-affirmation of their love of God and each other, finally brings Danny and Gretchen back together.
7	"The Mother of All Daddies"	Danny has fully re-assumed his position as husband and father, and things appear to be quiet and back to normal. However, Gretchen's band is scheduled to play another gig, and discussions resurface about Danny's angry behavior the last time she performed. It's agreed that Danny still harbors many of the behaviors his abusive, now-dead father had imparted to him. In an effort to gain some sense of closure, Danny visits his father's grave, and then a psychic, to see if there's any value in communication with 'the great beyond'. What Danny learns from the psychic spooks him, leading him into temptation to drink at Gretchen's gig.
8	"Cross Road"	Danny is convinced that the only thing that can save him is God. He dives head-first into church, leaving his friends and loved ones to wonder: Is this real, or desperation?
