= LFO (American band) =

American pop and hip-hop band

- Also known as: Lyte Funkie Ones
- Origin: New Bedford, Massachusetts, U.S.
- Genres: R&B; pop-rap; hip-hop; dance; pop rock; Europop; dance-pop
- Years active: 1995–2002; 2009–2010; 2017–2018; 2024–present
- Labels: Arista; J; LFO
- Members: Brad Fischetti
- Past members: Rich Cronin; Brian Gillis; Devin Lima
- Website: www.myspace.com/lfomusic

LFO (an acronym for Lyte Funky Ones) is an American pop and hip-hop band formed in New Bedford, Massachusetts, in 1995. The band's original lineup consisted of Brad Fischetti, Rich Cronin, and Brian "Brizz" Gillis. LFO's single "Summer Girls" reached number 3 on the Billboard Hot 100, and the band had sold over four million records worldwide.

In 1998, Gillis left the group and was replaced by Harold "Devin" Lima. After Cronin’s death in 2010, the group disbanded; they briefly reunited with Fischetti and Lima as a duo in 2017 before Lima's death a year later. In 2025, Jeff Mezydlo of Yardbarker included the band in his list of "20 underrated bands from the 1990s who are worth rediscovering".

== History ==
=== 1995–1998: Origins and Gillis's departure ===
In 1995, New Bedford, Massachusetts, Rich Cronin and Brad Fischetti met Brian "Brizz" Gillis. LFO had marginal success with the remake of the Yvonne Elliman song "If I Can't Have You", which missed the Top 40, reaching No. 54 on the UK Singles Chart. In 1997, they released a cover of the 1990 New Kids on the Block hit "Step By Step" as a single. In 1999, Gillis left the group to pursue a solo career. Gillis died of undisclosed causes on March 29, 2023, at age 48.

=== 2000–2002: Life Is Good and first split ===
They appeared on The Amanda Show as guest stars, singing a song while Amanda Bynes danced in the background with the show's signature "dancing lobsters". At the end, LFO described Amanda as "the most beautiful girl in the world".

In the summer 2001, the group released their sophomore and final album, Life Is Good, with the release of only two singles, "Life Is Good" and "Every Other Time", which was the only commercial release from the album.

After lackluster record sales of the album and the late-1990s/early-2000s boyband trend nearing its end, LFO parted ways in February 2002. Brad Fischetti recalled years later that the band didn't initially end on good terms. "When we walked out of the room in 2002, it was like a weight was lifted off of our shoulders."

=== 2002–2009: Initial breakup ===
In an attempt to form a pop group without it being labeled as a boy band, Cronin founded Bad Mood Mike in 2003. The project failed, as it never produced an album, and ended after a few months. Cronin was later in a group called Loose Cannons, with Doug Ray. He was also part of the TV show Mission: Man Band, which aired on VH1.

In March 2005, Cronin sought treatment for constant headaches, and was diagnosed with leukemia. He underwent chemotherapy in Boston, and by January 2006, his leukemia was in remission. In 2008, Cronin launched his first solo studio album, entitled Billion Dollar Sound.

Lima released his first solo track back in 2006, it being a cover of the Sly & the Family Stone song “If You Want Me to Stay” for the tribute album Different Strokes by Different Folks. This led to him performing as part of a tribute to Sly Stone, on the 2006 Grammy Awards, alongside Steven Tyler and Joe Perry of Aerosmith, Maroon 5, Joss Stone, John Legend and will.i.am.

Lima formed a new band, The Cadbury Diesel, and released their debut record, Mozart Popart, in July 2008. Cadbury Diesel performed a song entitled "Rocky Road" for the film American Pie Presents Beta House (2007). Lima later performed music under the alias Live From Orlando.

Brad Fischetti has since become an anti-abortion activist. During a 2012 religious group protest he was live tweeting from outside an abortion clinic. Included in his tweets were the doctor's name, and an apparent quote from a nurse claiming financial motives for the services offered there. In a statement to E! News, Fischetti denied harassing any women outside the clinic, but adamantly stood by his views and said he regrets not speaking out more when LFO was at the height of its fame. He is also the music director for a church.

=== 2009–2010: Reunion and Cronin's death ===
On June 3, 2009, LFO posted a blog entitled "LFO is Back" on their unofficial MySpace page which announced that they had reunited and were going on the Malcolm Douglas Tribute tour beginning September 23, 2009, with Rookie of the Year, Go Crash Audio, and Kiernan McMullan. A new song, titled "Summer of My Life," was also announced in association with the reunion.

However, the reunion was short-lived as Cronin died at the Brigham and Women's Hospital in Boston, Massachusetts, at the age of 36 on September 8, 2010, after suffering from leukemia. On September 28, 2009, LFO announced through their YouTube page LFOVIDEOS that they had permanently disbanded. The remaining two members of the band planned to continue making music with their various side projects.

=== 2017–2018: Second reunion, new single, and Lima's death ===
In late 2013, Lima formed a group with electronic artists DJ Shakka and Ayj as The Mack Pack, releasing two singles in 2014. The group later changed its name to Rogue Cherry with the addition of Alexandra Foster and produced a posthumous album, Harold Lima: Rockwell.

In July 2017, LFO released their first new song after 15 years and the only song as a duo and without Cronin, titled "Perfect 10". It featured then-surviving members Lima and Fischetti. On the reunion, Fischetti told Entertainment Weekly that "We're sincerely thankful and excited to have the opportunity to create new music and tour again. We miss the presence of our late great brother bandmate Rich Cronin. We will do our best to make him proud, carry on his legacy, and to usher LFO into the future."

In October 2017, Devin Lima was diagnosed with stage four adrenal cancer and had one kidney removed. The news was confirmed by Fischetti. Lima died of his cancer on November 21, 2018, at age 41.

=== 2019–present: O-Town reunion, Y2K Tour ===
The final living member, Brad Fischetti, began touring with pop group O-Town in a series of dates during the Y2K tour. He performed LFO songs in memory of Cronin and Lima, and vowed to keep the LFO legacy alive.

== Members ==
=== Current ===
- Brad Fischetti (1995–2002, 2009, 2017–2018; 2024–present)

=== Former ===
- Rich Cronin (1995–2002, 2009; died 2010)
- Brian Gillis (1995–1998; died 2023)
- Devin Lima (1999–2002, 2009, 2017–2018; died 2018)

== Discography ==
=== Albums ===
Year	Album	Peak chart positions		Certifications (sales threshold)
Year	Album	US	UK	Certifications (sales threshold)
1999	LFO: Released: August 24, 1999; Label: Arista	21	62	RIAA: Platinum; MC: Gold
2001	Life Is Good: Released: June 26, 2001; Label: Arista	75	—	

=== Singles ===
Year	Single	Chart positions						Album
Year	Single	US	AUS	CAN	GER	NZ	UK	Album
1997	"(Sex U Up) The Way You Like It"	—^{[A]}	—	—	—	—	—	Non-album singles
1997	"Step by Step"	—	—	—	—	79	—	Non-album singles
1998	"Can't Have You" (featuring Kayo)	70	—	—	—	—	54	LFO
1999	"Summer Girls"	3	71	18	56	14	16	LFO
1999	"Girl on TV"	10	—	39	80	—	6	LFO
2000	"I Don't Wanna Kiss You Goodnight"	61	—	—	—	—	—	LFO
2000	"West Side Story"	84	—	—	—	—	—	LFO
2001	"Every Other Time"	44	—	—	98	18	24	Life is Good
2002	"Life Is Good" (featuring M.O.P.)	—	—	—	—	—	—	Life is Good
2017	"Perfect 10"	—	—	—	—	—	—	Non-album single

=== Music videos ===
Year	Title	Director(s)	Note(s)
1997	"(Sex U up) The Way You Like It"	None	Debut single
1997	"Step by Step"	Unknown	Cover version of song by boy band New Kids On The Block
1998	"Can't Have You" (feat. Kayo)	Unknown	Yvonne Elliman cover version. Features the Swedish singer Kayo. Final music video to feature Brian Gillis.
1999	"Summer Girls"	Marcus Raboy	First music video to feature Devin Lima.
1999	"Girl on TV"	Gregory Dark	Features a guest appearance by Rich Cronin's then-girlfriend and actress Jennifer Love Hewitt
2000	"I Don't Wanna Kiss You Goodnight"	Gregory Dark	
2000	"West Side Story"	None	
2001	"Every Other Time"	Marcus Raboy	
2002	"Life Is Good"	Unknown	

== Notes ==
- A "(Sex U Up) The Way You Like It" did not enter the Billboard Hot 100, but peaked at number 3 on the Bubbling Under Hot 100 Singles chart, which acts as a 25-song extension to the Hot 100.
