= Rich Cronin =

American singer and rapper (1974–2010)

- Born: Richard Burton Cronin; August 30, 1974; Boston, Massachusetts, U.S.
- Origin: Kingston, Massachusetts, U.S.
- Died: September 8, 2010 (aged 36) Boston, Massachusetts, U.S.
- Genres: Pop; R&B; hip hop
- Occupations: Singer; songwriter; rapper
- Years active: 1995–2010
- Labels: Arista; J; Orange Freeze
- Formerly of: LFO

Richard Burton Cronin (August 30, 1974 – September 8, 2010) was an American musician, songwriter and rapper, best known for being the lead vocalist and primary songwriter for the pop and hip hop group LFO.

== Early life and education ==
Cronin was born in the West Roxbury neighborhood of Boston, Massachusetts, on August 30, 1974, the son of Richard and Doris (Eddy) Cronin. He grew up in Kingston, Massachusetts, and was of Irish and Swedish ancestry. He had a brother Michael and a sister Cassandra. Cronin attended Sacred Heart High School, graduating in 1993. He also attended Bridgewater State College and worked part-time in a Blockbuster video store.

== Career ==
=== LFO ===
Cronin was a founding member of the pop group LFO. The group started in Germany by BMG in 1997 with member Brian Gillis, aka "Brizz". In early 1998, the group opened for NSYNC and by this time were signed to BMG/Logic Records in the U.S. They were labeled as the "bad boys of pop" and cited The Beastie Boys and New Edition as influences. They released two singles "Sex U Up (The Way You Like It)" and "Can't Have You" with original member Brian Gillis, who left the group frustrated with the direction of the group and lack of success. Rich's brother Mike Cronin was a manager for the pop group O-Town.

Harold "Devin" Lima was added to the group to replace Brian Gillis six months before the hit "Summer Girls" was released. By this time, the group had transitioned from Logic Records to Arista Records. Executive Clive Davis worked closely with Cronin on the group's self-titled debut album.

The group's breakout hit "Summer Girls" was written by Cronin in 1999, hit number 3 on Billboard's Hot 100, and was #1 on the Billboard Hot 100 Single Sales chart for six weeks. The single also went platinum in the U.S. with sales of over 1 million units.

The group's second album, Life is Good, was released on Davis' new label, J Records, with Cronin writing or co-writing each song on the album. The group had success with the album's first single "Every Other Time". LFO disbanded in 2002.

=== After LFO ===
In 2007, Cronin was a cast member for the VH1 reality show Mission: Man Band. The show also starred Chris Kirkpatrick of NSYNC, Jeff Timmons of 98 Degrees and Bryan Abrams of Color Me Badd. The four former pop stars came together in Orlando, Florida, to reestablish their music careers and to pitch their new music to major record labels over the period of three weeks in hopes of getting a record deal.

== Solo career ==
In 2008, Cronin released his only solo album, Billion Dollar Sound. He recorded two singles, "Impossible" and "Story of My Life". Cronin also formed a rap duo with Doug Ray (formerly of Bad Ronald) called Loose Cannons. They released one album entitled Life Goes On. The band performed shows from 2006 until 2008.

=== 2009 reunion tour with LFO ===
On June 3, 2009, LFO posted a blog entitled "LFO IS BACK" on their official MySpace page which announced that they had reunited and were going on tour beginning July 9, 2009, with Rookie of the Year, Go Crash Audio, and Kiernan McMullan. A new song titled "Summer of My Life" also was announced in association with the reunion. In September 2009, however, LFO announced that they had again broken up.

Cronin's final song "It Only Gets Better" was recorded in 2009 after the LFO reunion tour. It was released shortly after his death from a stroke on September 8, 2010. Billboard described the song as an "upbeat tune...reminiscent of the boy band's past hits 'Summer Girls' and 'Girl on TV', but the lyrics discuss Cronin's health struggles and how they altered his view of the world".

== Personal life ==
In 1999, Cronin began dating actress Jennifer Love Hewitt, after meeting her backstage at the Blockbuster Entertainment Awards. Cronin wrote the song "Girl on TV" about Hewitt, and she also appeared in the associated video. They broke up in 2000.

== Illness and death ==
In March 2005, Cronin sought treatment for constant headaches and he was diagnosed with acute myelogenous leukemia. Cronin recalled the moment his doctor told him about his diagnosis, saying that: "Eventually, the doctor came in and said, 'There's no easy way to say this, Rich, but you have leukemia.' When he said that, it was like a train had barreled through the room. From that second, they've been treating me as a cancer patient." He underwent chemotherapy at the Beth Israel Deaconess Medical Center in Boston. By January 2006, his leukemia was in remission, but it recurred in 2007. He subsequently started the Rich Cronin Hope Foundation for Leukemia to raise awareness.

In the summer of 2010, Cronin suffered a relapse, and he was treated at Spaulding Rehabilitation Hospital in Boston. On the afternoon of September 8, 2010, Cronin died at the Brigham and Women's Hospital after suffering a stroke secondary to his leukemia due to complications from medicine he was taking to offset GVHD (graft-versus-host disease), which he had been struggling with after having a stem cell transplant. He was 36 years old. His funeral was held at St. Joseph Church in Kingston, Massachusetts, on September 13, attended by family and friends. He is buried at Vine Hills Cemetery in Plymouth County, Massachusetts.

== Discography ==
=== LFO ===
- LFO (1999)
- Life Is Good (2001)

=== Loose Cannons ===
- Life Goes On (2006)

=== Solo ===
- Billion Dollar Sound (2008)
