= Jonas Brothers discography =

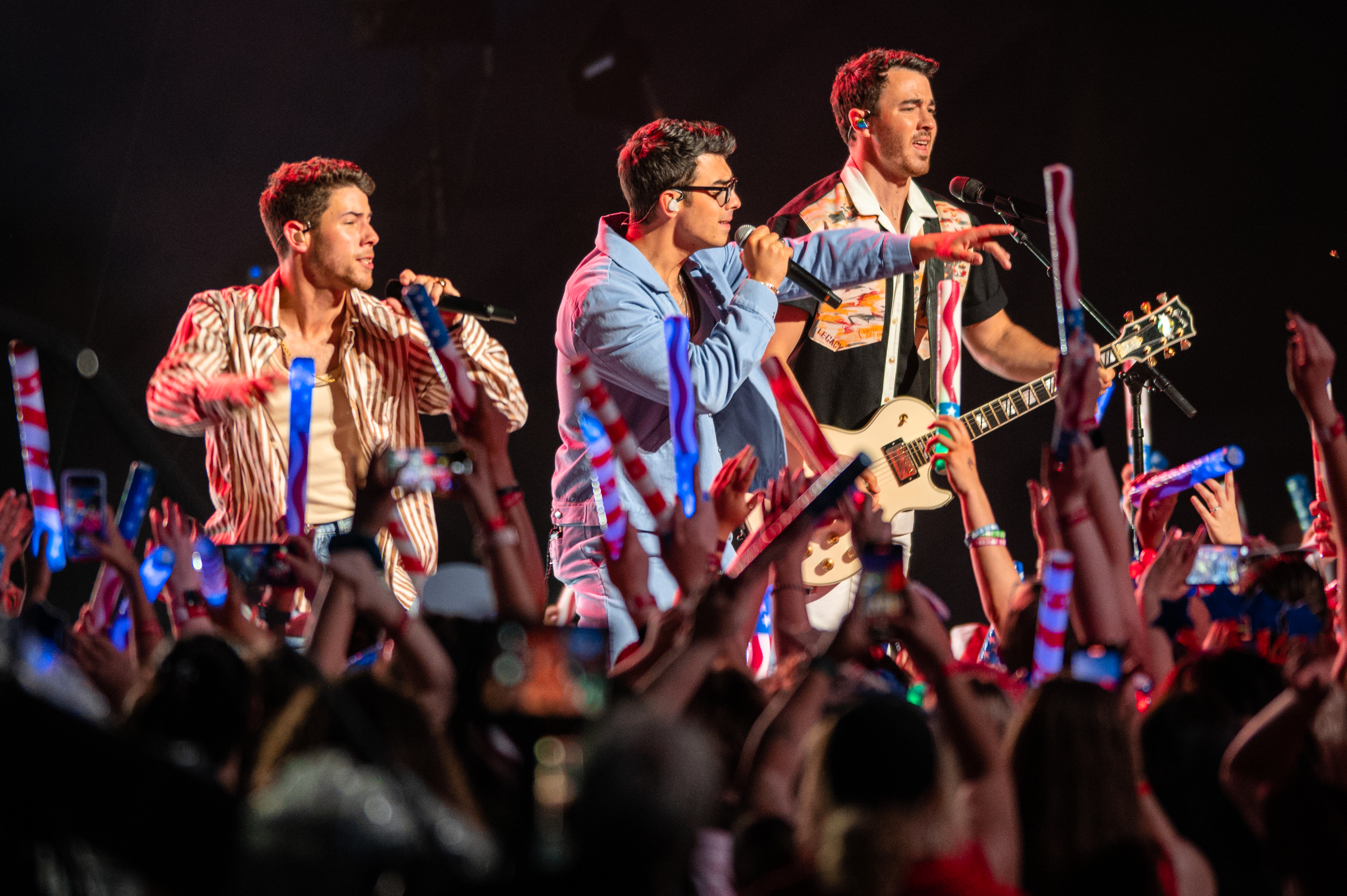
- Jonas Brothers performing in 2021
- Studio albums: 7
- Extended plays: 3
- Soundtrack albums: 3
- Live albums: 3
- Compilation albums: 2
- Singles: 30
- Video albums: 1
- Music videos: 31
- Miscellaneous: 10
- Promotional singles: 8

The American group Jonas Brothers has released seven studio albums, three live albums, three soundtrack albums, two compilation albums, one video album, three extended plays, and 30 singles (including four as featured artists). On August 8, 2006, the Jonas Brothers released their debut studio album, It's About Time. The album reached number 91 on the Billboard 200.

On August 7, 2007, the Jonas Brothers released their self-titled second studio album. The album reached number five on the Billboard 200. It produced the top-20 single, "S.O.S", which reached number 17 on the Billboard Hot 100. It also produced the top-40 singles, "Year 3000" (a cover of Busted's single of the same name) and "When You Look Me in the Eyes", which reached numbers 31 and 25 on the Hot 100, respectively. Later that year, they released the single "Play My Music", which charted at number 20 on the Hot 100.

On August 12, 2008, the Jonas Brothers released their third studio album, A Little Bit Longer. The album debuted and peaked atop the Billboard 200, giving them their first chart-topping project. It produced the top-10 singles, "Burnin' Up" and "Tonight", which reached numbers five and eight on the Billboard Hot 100, respectively. It also produced the top-20 promotional singles, the albums title track and "Pushin' Me Away", which reached numbers 11 and 16 on the Hot 100, respectively.

On June 16, 2009, the Jonas Brothers released their fourth studio album, Lines, Vines and Trying Times. The album debuted and peaked atop the Billboard 200, giving them their second chart-topping project. It produced the top-40 single, "Paranoid", which reached number 37 on the Billboard Hot 100. However, the group went on hiatus sometime in 2009. Later that year, they released a collaboration with Miley Cyrus, Demi Lovato, and Selena Gomez, "Send It On", as a promotional single, which reached number 20 on the Hot 100.

On June 7, 2019, the Jonas Brothers released their fifth studio album, Happiness Begins, as their comeback album. The album debuted and peaked atop the Billboard 200, giving them their third chart-topping project. It produced the Billboard Hot 100 number-one single, "Sucker", which was the first single that the group released after their hiatus ended. It also produced the top-20 single, "Only Human", which reached number 18 on the Hot 100, as well as the top-40 single, "Cool", which reached number 27 on the Hot 100. In 2020, the Jonas Brothers released the single "What a Man Gotta Do", which debuted and peaked at number 16 on the Hot 100. That same year, they released the single "X", which features Karol G and debuted and peaked at number 33 on the Hot 100. In 2021, the Jonas Brothers released a collaboration with Marshmello, "Leave Before You Love Me", which reached number 19 on the Hot 100.

On May 12, 2023, the Jonas Brothers released their sixth studio album, The Album. The album debuted and peaked at number three on the Billboard 200. On June 13, 2025, they released a live album called Live from the O2 London, which was recorded during their concerts at the O2 Arena in London, England, as part of their Five Albums. One Night. The World Tour on September 16-17, 2024.

On August 8, 2025, the Jonas Brothers released their seventh studio album, Greetings from Your Hometown. The album debuted and peaked at number six on the Billboard 200. On November 14, 2025, they released a soundtrack album of their Christmas movie, A Very Jonas Christmas Movie, along with the film's release. On March 13, 2026, they released a live album called Friends from Your Hometown, which was recorded during the fall and winter at various stops of their Jonas20: Greetings from Your Hometown Tour the previous year, containing professionally-recorded live performances with numerous special guests that were brought out during the tour, as well as a live rendition of "Backwards" from Greetings from Your Hometown.

== Albums ==
=== Studio albums ===
List of albums, with selected chart positions and certifications
Title	Album details	Peak chart positions										Sales	Certifications
Title	Album details	US	AUS	BEL	CAN	GER	IRL	ITA	NZ	SPA	UK	Sales	Certifications
It's About Time	Released: August 8, 2006; Formats: CD, LP, digital download, streaming; Label: Columbia	91	—	—	—	—	—	—	—	—	—	US: 123,000	
Jonas Brothers	Released: August 7, 2007; Formats: CD, LP, cassette, digital download, streaming; Label: Hollywood	5	43	7	10	19	14	10	29	5	9	US: 2,409,000	RIAA: Platinum; BPI: Gold; IRMA: Gold; MC: Platinum
A Little Bit Longer	Released: August 12, 2008; Formats: CD, LP, digital download, streaming; Label: Hollywood	1	13	75	1	26	15	2	11	3	19	US: 2,082,000	RIAA: Platinum; BPI: Gold; IRMA: Gold; MC: 2× Platinum; RMNZ: Gold
Lines, Vines and Trying Times	Released: June 16, 2009; Formats: CD, LP, digital download, streaming; Label: Hollywood	1	5	16	1	56	6	8	8	1	9	US: 757,000	FIMI: Gold; IRMA: Gold; MC: Platinum; RMNZ: Gold
Happiness Begins	Released: June 7, 2019; Formats: CD, LP, cassette, digital download, streaming; Label: Republic	1	3	8	1	17	4	28	5	3	2	US: 469,000; CAN: 40,000	RIAA: Platinum; BPI: Silver; MC: 2× Platinum; RMNZ: Platinum
The Album	Released: May 12, 2023; Formats: CD, LP, cassette, digital download, streaming; Label: Republic	3	20	40	19	99	55	—	20	56	3	US: 52,000	
Greetings from Your Hometown	Released: August 8, 2025; Formats: CD, LP, cassette, digital download, streaming; Label: Republic	6	93	56	55	—	—	—	—	—	—		
"—" denotes releases that did not chart or were not released in that territory.

=== Live albums ===
List of albums, with selected chart positions and certifications
Title	Album details	Peak chart positions					
Title	Album details	US	AUS	BEL	CAN	ITA	SPA
Music from the 3D Concert Experience	Released: February 24, 2009; Formats: CD, LP, digital download, streaming; Label: Hollywood	3	74	97	9	38	32
Live	Released: November 26, 2013; Formats: LP, digital download, streaming; Label: Jonas	—	—	—	—	—	—
Live from the O2 London	Released: June 13, 2025; Formats: Digital download, streaming; Label: Republic	—	—	—	—	—	—
Friends from Your Hometown	Released: March 13, 2026; Formats: Digital download, streaming; Label: Republic	—	—	—	—	—	—
"—" denotes releases that did not chart or were not released in that territory.

=== Soundtrack albums ===
List of albums, with selected chart positions and certifications
Title	Album details	Peak chart positions									Certifications
Title	Album details	US	AUS	BEL	CAN	GER	ITA	NZ	SPA	UK	Certifications
Camp Rock	Released: June 17, 2008; Formats: CD, LP, digital download, streaming; Label: Walt Disney	3	13	3	2	9	1	5	2	13	RIAA: Platinum; BPI: Gold; RMNZ: Gold
Jonas L.A.	Released: July 20, 2010; Formats: CD, LP, digital download, streaming; Label: Hollywood	7	—	59	10	—	32	—	51	105	
Camp Rock 2: The Final Jam	Released: August 10, 2010; Formats: CD, digital download, streaming; Label: Walt Disney	3	58	10	4	28	2	22	4	—	RIAA: Gold; BPI: Silver
A Very Jonas Christmas Movie (Original Soundtrack)	Released: November 14, 2025; Formats: CD, LP, digital download, streaming; Label: Hollywood and Republic	52	—	—	58	—	—	—	—	—	
"—" denotes releases that did not chart or were not released in that territory.

=== Compilation albums ===
List of compilation albums
Title	Details	Peak chart positions					Certifications
Title	Details	US	AUS	CAN	IRL	NZ	Certifications
Music from Chasing Happiness	Released: May 9, 2019; Formats: CD, digital download, streaming; Label: Republic	—	—	—	70	—	
The Family Business	Released: February 17, 2023; Formats: digital download, streaming, CD, LP; Label: Republic	112	84	75	99	14	BPI: Gold; RMNZ: Platinum
"—" denotes releases that did not chart of were not released in the territory.

=== Video albums ===
List of video albums
Title	Album details	Certifications
Jonas Brothers: The 3D Concert Experience	Released: February 27, 2009; Formats: DVD, Blu-ray, digital download; Label: Hollywood	BPI: Gold

== Extended plays ==
List of extended plays, with selected chart positions
Title	Extended play details	Peak chart positions
Title	Extended play details	US
Be Mine	Released: January 20, 2009; Format: CD, digital download; Label: Universal	—
iTunes Live from SoHo	Released: February 24, 2009; Format: Digital download; Label: Universal	150
Live: Walmart Soundcheck	Released: November 10, 2009; Formats: CD+DVD, LP; Label: Hollywood	139
XV	Released: October 26, 2020; Format: CD, vinyl, cassette, digital download; Label: Republic; Note: Conjoined single release consisting of "X" and "Five More Minutes".	—
"—" denotes releases that did not chart of were not released in the territory.

== Miscellaneous ==
=== Streaming-exclusive compilations ===
List of compilations with notes
Title	Details	Notes
Dance with Joe	Released: July 24, 2020; Format: Streaming, digital download; Label: Republic	Playlist consisting of select songs from the Jonas Brothers and DNCE
At Home with Kevin	Released: July 31, 2020; Format: Streaming, digital download; Label: Republic	Playlist consisting of select songs from the Jonas Brothers
Chill with Nick	Released: August 7, 2020; Format: Streaming, digital download; Label: Republic	Playlist consisting of select songs from the Jonas Brothers and Nick Jonas
Set the Mood	Released: September 11, 2020; Format: Streaming, digital download; Label: Republic	Playlist consisting of select songs from the Jonas Brothers and Nick Jonas
Chasing Happiness	Released: September 18, 2020; Format: Streaming, digital download; Label: Republic	Playlist consisting of select songs from the Jonas Brothers
Burnin It Up	Released: September 25, 2020; Format: Streaming, digital download; Label: Republic	Playlist consisting of select songs from the Jonas Brothers, DNCE and Nick Jonas
The Beginning	Released: October 2, 2020; Format: Streaming, digital download; Label: Republic	Playlist consisting of select songs from the Jonas Brothers
Guitar Picks	Released: October 3, 2020; Format: Streaming, digital download; Label: Republic	Playlist consisting of select songs from the Jonas Brothers
Party Starter	Released: October 4, 2020; Format: Streaming, digital download; Label: Republic	Playlist consisting of select songs from the Jonas Brothers, DNCE and Nick Jonas
Setlist: The Remember This Tour	Released: October 29, 2021; Formats: digital download, streaming; Label: Republic	Playlist consisting of songs that Jonas Brothers performed on their Remember This Tour (2021)

== Singles ==
=== As lead artists ===
List of singles as lead artists, with selected chart positions
Title	Year	Peak chart positions										Certifications	Album
Title	Year	US	US Pop	AUS	BEL	CAN	GER	IRL	ITA	NZ	UK	Certifications	Album
"Mandy"	2005	—	—	—	—	—	—	—	—	—	—		It's About Time
"Kids of the Future"	2007	— (Note: "Kids of the Future" did not enter the Billboard Hot 100, but peaked at number 22 on the Bubbling Under Hot 100 chart.)	—	—	—	—	—	—	—	—	—		Meet the Robinsons
"Year 3000"	2007	31	—	72	—	—	—	—	—	—	—	MC: Gold	Jonas Brothers
"Hold On"	2007	52	—	—	26	—	—	—	—	—	106		Jonas Brothers
"S.O.S"	2007	17	24	47	8	49	26	14	29	—	13	BPI: Silver; MC: Platinum	Jonas Brothers
"When You Look Me in the Eyes"	2007	25	16	46	— (Note: "When You Look Me in the Eyes" did not enter the Ultratop 50, but peaked at number two on the Flemish Ultratip chart.)	30	—	—	—	—	30	BPI: Silver (Note: "Burnin' Up" and "When You Look Me in the Eyes" were certified together in the UK.); MC: Gold	Jonas Brothers
"Play My Music"	2008	20	—	71	—	22	—	—	35	—	57	RIAA: Platinum; MC: Gold	Camp Rock
"Burnin' Up"	2008	5	12	31	— (Note: "Burnin' Up" did not enter the Ultratop 50, but peaked at number 29 on the Flemish Ultratip chart.)	14	35	21	16	—	30	RIAA: 2× Platinum; ARIA: Gold; BPI: Silver; MC: 3× Platinum; RMNZ: Platinum	A Little Bit Longer
"Lovebug"	2008	49	29	94	—	45	—	—	—	—	92	MC: Platinum	A Little Bit Longer
"Tonight"	2008	8	—	97	—	13	—	—	—	—	—		A Little Bit Longer
"Paranoid"	2009	37	27	60	— (Note: "Paranoid" did not enter the Ultratop 50, but peaked at number 12 on the Flemish Ultratip chart.)	37	65	27	46	—	56	MC: Gold	Lines, Vines and Trying Times
"Fly with Me"	2009	83	—	—	—	—	89	—	—	—	166		Lines, Vines and Trying Times
"Pom Poms"	2013	60	—	—	— (Note: "Pom Poms" did not enter the Ultratop 50, but peaked at number 68 on the Flemish Ultratip chart.)	57	—	—	56	—	—		LiVe
"First Time"	2013	— (Note: "First Time" did not enter the Billboard Hot 100, but peaked at number 14 on the Bubbling Under Hot 100 chart.)	34	—	—	—	—	—	—	—	—		LiVe
"Sucker"	2019	1	1	1	9	1	20	2	35	1	4	RIAA: 5× Platinum; ARIA: 5× Platinum; BEA: Platinum; BPI: 2× Platinum; BVMI: Platinum; FIMI: Platinum; MC: 8× Platinum; RMNZ: 4× Platinum	Happiness Begins
"Cool"	2019	27	10	54	—	34	—	27	—	— (Note: "Cool" did not enter the NZ Top 40 Singles Chart, but peaked at number six on the NZ Hot Singles Chart.)	39	RIAA: Platinum; ARIA: Gold; BPI: Silver; MC: 2× Platinum; RMNZ: Platinum	Happiness Begins
"Only Human"	2019	18	3	38	10	18	—	30	—	35	64	RIAA: 2× Platinum; BEA: Gold; BPI: Silver; FIMI: Gold; MC: 5× Platinum; ARIA: 2× Platinum; RMNZ: 2× Platinum	Happiness Begins
"Lonely" (with Diplo)	2019	— (Note: "Lonely" did not enter the Billboard Hot 100, but peaked at number 10 on the Bubbling Under Hot 100 chart.)	27	40	— (Note: "Lonely" did not enter the Ultratop 50, but peaked at number 19 on the Flemish Ultratip chart.)	69	—	54	—	— (Note: "Lonely" did not enter the NZ Top 40 Singles Chart, but peaked at number six on the NZ Hot Singles Chart.)	89	RIAA: Gold; ARIA: Platinum; MC: Platinum; RMNZ: Platinum	Diplo Presents Thomas Wesley, Chapter 1: Snake Oil
"Like It's Christmas"	2019	27	—	47	— (Note: "Like It's Christmas" did not enter the Ultratop 50, but peaked at number 18 on the Flemish Ultratip chart.)	41	27	47	—	— (Note: "Like It's Christmas" did not enter the NZ Top 40 Singles Chart, but peaked at number 12 on the NZ Hot Singles Chart.)	53	RIAA: Platinum; BPI: Silver; BVMI: Gold; MC: 2× Platinum; RMNZ: Gold	Non-album singles
"What a Man Gotta Do"	2020	16	14	22	21	19	67	18	—	31	22	RIAA: 2× Platinum; ARIA: Platinum; BEA: Gold; BPI: Platinum; MC: 4× Platinum; RMNZ: 2× Platinum	Non-album singles
"X" (featuring Karol G) (Note: "X" and "Five More Minutes" were released as part of a conjoined single titled XV.)	2020	33	21	61	19	42	—	71	—	— (Note: "X" did not enter the NZ Top 40 Singles Chart, but peaked at number seven on the NZ Hot Singles Chart.)	82	MC: Platinum	Non-album singles
"Five More Minutes"	2020	—	—	—	—	—	—	—	—	— (Note: "Five More Minutes" did not enter the NZ Top 40 Singles Chart, but peaked at number 20 on the NZ Hot Singles Chart.)	—		Non-album singles
"I Need You Christmas"	2020	— (Note: "I Need You Christmas" did not enter the Billboard Hot 100, but peaked at number four on the Bubbling Under Hot 100 chart.)	—	—	— (Note: "I Need You Christmas" did not enter the Ultratop 50, but peaked at number 16 on the Flemish Ultratip chart.)	88	—	77	—	— (Note: "I Need You Christmas" did not enter the NZ Top 40 Singles Chart, but peaked at number 32 on the NZ Hot Singles Chart.)	86		Non-album singles
"Leave Before You Love Me" (with Marshmello)	2021	19	9	26	32	7	—	37	—	— (Note: "Leave Before You Love Me" did not enter the NZ Top 40 Singles Chart, but peaked at number 14 on the NZ Hot Singles Chart.)	24	RIAA: Platinum; ARIA: 2× Platinum; BPI: Platinum; RMNZ: 3× Platinum	Non-album singles
"Remember This"	2021	—	—	—	—	—	—	—	—	— (Note: "Remember This" did not enter the NZ Top 40 Singles Chart, but peaked at number 28 on the NZ Hot Singles Chart.)	—		Non-album singles
"Who's in Your Head"	2021	92	16	—	30	69	—	—	—	— (Note: "Who's in Your Head" did not enter the NZ Top 40 Singles Chart, but peaked at number 29 on the NZ Hot Singles Chart.)	—		Non-album singles
"Wings"	2023	—	—	—	—	—	—	—	—	— (Note: "Wings" did not enter the NZ Top 40 Singles Chart, but peaked at number 21 on the NZ Hot Singles Chart.)	—		The Album
"Waffle House"	2023	57	13	—	50	35	—	21	—	— (Note: "Waffle House" did not enter the NZ Top 40 Singles Chart, but peaked at number nine on the NZ Hot Singles Chart.)	22	BPI: Gold; MC: Platinum; RMNZ: Gold	The Album
"Summer Baby"	2023	—	33	—	—	—	—	—	—	— (Note: "Summer Baby" did not enter the NZ Top 40 Singles Chart, but peaked at number 15 on the NZ Hot Singles Chart.)	—		The Album
"Do It Like That" (with Tomorrow X Together)	2023	—	—	—	—	—	—	—	—	— (Note: "Do It Like That" did not enter the NZ Top 40 Singles Chart, but peaked at number nine on the NZ Hot Singles Chart.)	—		The Name Chapter: Freefall
"Year 3000 2.0" (with Busted)	2023	—	—	—	—	—	—	—	—	—	—		Greatest Hits 2.0 (Guest Features Edition)
"Strong Enough" (featuring Bailey Zimmerman)	2023	— (Note: "Strong Enough" did not enter the Billboard Hot 100, but peaked at number 16 on the Bubbling Under Hot 100 chart.)	25	—	—	—	—	—	—	— (Note: "Strong Enough" did not enter the NZ Top 40 Singles Chart, but peaked at number 19 on the NZ Hot Singles Chart.)	—		Non-album single
"Holiday" (with Jimmy Fallon)	2024	—	—	—	—	—	—	—	—	—	—		Holiday Seasoning
"Slow Motion" (with Marshmello)	2025	—	37	—	22	—	—	—	—	— (Note: "Slow Motion" did not enter the NZ Top 40 Singles Chart, but peaked at number 10 on the NZ Hot Singles Chart.)	—		Greetings from Your Hometown
"I Dare You" (with Rascal Flatts)	2025	— (Note: "I Dare You" did not enter the Billboard Hot 100, but peaked at number 23 on the Bubbling Under Hot 100 chart.)	—	—	—	—	—	—	—	— (Note: "I Dare You" did not enter the NZ Top 40 Singles Chart, but peaked at number 26 on the NZ Hot Singles Chart.)	—		Life Is a Highway: Refueled Duets
"Love Me to Heaven"	2025	—	35	—	31	—	—	—	—	— (Note: "Love Me to Heaven" did not enter the NZ Top 40 Singles Chart, but peaked at number 14 on the NZ Hot Singles Chart.)	— (Note: "Love Me to Heaven" did not enter the UK Singles Chart Top 100, but debuted at number 36 on the UK Singles Downloads Chart and at number 40 on the UK Singles Sales Chart.)		Greetings from Your Hometown
"No Time to Talk"	2025	— (Note: "No Time to Talk" did not enter the Billboard Hot 100, but peaked at number 23 on the Bubbling Under Hot 100 chart.)	27	—	—	—	—	—	—	—	—		Greetings from Your Hometown
"I Can't Lose"	2025	—	—	—	—	—	—	—	—	—	—		Greetings from Your Hometown
"Coming Home This Christmas" (featuring Kenny G)	2025	—	—	—	—	—	—	—	—	—	—		A Very Jonas Christmas Movie (Original Soundtrack)
"Cliché" (Jonas Brothers remix) (with MGK)	2025	—	—	—	—	—	—	—	—	—	—		Non-album singles
"Listen When Sad"	2026	—	37	—	—	—	—	—	—	— (Note: "Listen When Sad" did not enter the NZ Top 40 Singles Chart, but peaked at number 38 on the NZ Hot 40 Singles Chart.)	—		Non-album singles
"—" denotes releases that did not chart or were not released in that territory.

=== As featured artists ===
List of singles as featured artists, with selected chart positions
Title	Year	Peak chart positions										Certifications	Album
Title	Year	US	US Pop	US Latin	AUS	BEL	CAN	IRL	NZ	SPA	UK	Certifications	Album
"We Rock" (among Camp Rock cast)	2008	33	—	—	—	—	41	—	—	—	97		Camp Rock
"We Are the World 25 for Haiti" (among Artists for Haiti)	2010	2	—	—	18	1	2	9	8	15	46		Non-album single
"Runaway" (Sebastián Yatra, Daddy Yankee and Natti Natasha featuring Jonas Brothers)	2019	— (Note: "Runaway" did not enter the Billboard Hot 100, but peaked at number 11 on the Bubbling Under Hot 100 chart.)	—	12	—	—	—	—	—	29	—	RIAA: 7× Platinum (Latin); PROMUSICAE: Gold	Dharma
"Happen to Me" (Russell Dickerson featuring Jonas Brothers)	2025	—	—	—	—	—	—	—	—	—	—		Non-album single
"—" denotes releases that did not chart or were not released in that territory.

== Promotional singles ==
List of promotional singles, with selected chart positions
Title	Year	Peak chart positions				Album
Title	Year	US	US Kid	CAN	UK	Album
"A Little Bit Longer"	2008	11	—	10	—	A Little Bit Longer
"Pushin' Me Away"	2008	16	—	17	—	A Little Bit Longer
"Send It On" (with Miley Cyrus, Demi Lovato and Selena Gomez)	2009	20	—	—	—	Non-album promotional singles
"Bounce" (with Demi Lovato featuring Big Rob)	2009	—	—	—	—	Non-album promotional singles
"Keep It Real"	2009	—	—	—	—	Lines, Vines and Trying Times
"L.A. Baby (Where Dreams Are Made Of)"	2010	— (Note: "L.A. Baby (Where Dreams Are Made Of)" did not enter the Billboard Hot 100, but peaked at number two on the Bubbling Under Hot 100 Singles chart.)	1	92	175	Jonas L.A.
"Greenlight" (from Songland) (by Able Heart)	2019	— (Note: "Greenlight" did not enter the Billboard Hot 100, but peaked at number eight on the Bubbling Under Hot 100 chart.)	—	—	—	Non-album promotional single
"The Beautiful Letdown (Jonas Brothers Version)" (with Switchfoot)	2023	—	—	—	—	The Beautiful Letdown (Our Version)
"—" denotes releases that did not chart or were not released in that territory.

== Other charted songs ==
List of non-singles, with selected chart positions
Title	Year	Peak chart positions					Album
Title	Year	US	US Kid	US Pop	CAN	NZ Hot	Album
"We Got the Party" (Hannah Montana featuring Jonas Brothers)	2007	—	—	—	98	—	Hannah Montana 2
"Shelf"	2008	— (Note: "Shelf" did not enter the Billboard Hot 100, but peaked at number 18 on the Bubbling Under Hot 100 Singles chart.)	—	84	—	—	A Little Bit Longer
"Video Girl"	2008	— (Note: "Video Girl" did not enter the Billboard Hot 100, but peaked at number 14 on the Bubbling Under Hot 100 Singles chart.)	—	81	—	—	A Little Bit Longer
"Can't Have You"	2008	— (Note: "Can't Have You" did not enter the Billboard Hot 100, but peaked at number one on the Bubbling Under Hot 100 Singles chart.)	—	—	70	—	A Little Bit Longer
"Got Me Going Crazy"	2008	— (Note: "Got Me Going Crazy" did not enter the Billboard Hot 100, but peaked at number eight on the Bubbling Under Hot 100 Singles chart.)	—	80	—	—	A Little Bit Longer
"Sorry"	2008	— (Note: "Sorry" did not enter the Billboard Hot 100, but peaked at number 20 on the Bubbling Under Hot 100 Singles chart.)	—	—	—	—	A Little Bit Longer
"One Man Show"	2008	—	—	88	—	—	A Little Bit Longer
"BB Good"	2008	88	—	60	—	—	A Little Bit Longer
"On the Line" (Demi Lovato featuring Jonas Brothers)	2008	100	—	—	—	—	Don't Forget
"Love Is on Its Way"	2009	84	—	—	99	—	Music from the 3D Concert Experience
"World War III"	2009	— (Note: "World War III" did not enter the Billboard Hot 100, but peaked at number five on the Bubbling Under Hot 100 Singles chart.)	—	—	—	—	Lines, Vines and Trying Times
"Hey You"	2010	—	1	—	—	—	Jonas L.A.
"Your Biggest Fan" (featuring China Anne McClain)	2010	—	1	—	—	—	Jonas L.A.
"Invisible"	2010	—	2	—	—	—	Jonas L.A.
"Feelin' Alive"	2010	—	4	—	—	—	Jonas L.A.
"Make It Right"	2010	—	5	—	—	—	Jonas L.A.
"Fall"	2010	—	6	—	—	—	Jonas L.A.
"Critical"	2010	—	7	—	—	—	Jonas L.A.
"Things Will Never Be the Same"	2010	—	8	—	—	—	Jonas L.A.
"Summer Rain"	2010	—	14	—	—	—	Jonas L.A.
"I Believe"	2019	—	—	—	—	11	Happiness Begins
"Used to Be"	2019	—	—	—	—	20	Happiness Begins
"Rollercoaster"	2019	—	—	—	—	18	Happiness Begins
"Selfish" (Nick Jonas featuring Jonas Brothers)	2021	—	—	—	—	23	Spaceman
"Healing (Shattered Heart)" (with Kygo)	2024	—	—	—	—	23	Kygo
"Loved You Better" (with Dean Lewis)	2025	—	—	—	—	29	Greetings from Your Hometown
"—" denotes the single failed to chart or not released

== Guest appearances ==
List of non-single songs performed the Jonas Brothers not from their own projects
Title	Year	Other(s) artist(s)	Album
"Yo Ho (A Pirate's Life for Me)"	2006	—N/a	Disneymania 4
"Poor Unfortunate Souls"	2006	—N/a	The Little Mermaid
"American Dragon Theme Song"	2006	—N/a	American Dragon: Jake Long
"Time for Me to Fly"	2006	—N/a	Aquamarine
"I Wanna Be Like You"	2007	—N/a	Disneymania 5
"We Got the Party"	2007	Miley Cyrus	Hannah Montana 2
"Girl of My Dreams"	2007	—N/a	Disney Channel Holiday
"That's Just the Way We Roll"	2008	—N/a	Radio Disney Jams 10
"On the Line"	2008	Demi Lovato	Don't Forget
"We Got the Party" (Live)	2008	Miley Cyrus	Best of Both Worlds Concert
"Joyful Kings"	2008	—N/a	All Wrapped Up
"Live to Party"	2009	—N/a	Disney Channel Playlist
"Before the Storm" (Live)	2009	Miley Cyrus	The Time of Our Lives
"Summertime Anthem"	2009	—N/a	All Wrapped Up Vol. 2
"Give Love a Try"	2010	—N/a	Radio Disney Jams, Vol. 12
"Heart and Soul"	2010	—N/a	Camp Rock 2: The Final Jam
"Selfish"	2021	Nick Jonas	Spaceman
"Mercy"	2021	—N/a	Space Jam: A New Legacy
"Healing (Shattered Heart)"	2024	Kygo	Kygo
"Holiday"	2024	Jimmy Fallon, LL Cool J	Holiday Seasoning
"The Greatest"	2026	Nick Jonas	Sunday Best

== Music videos ==
List of music videos, showing year released and director
Title	Year	Director
"Mandy"	2006	Ondi Timoner
"Poor Unfortunate Souls"	2006	—N/a
"American Dragon Theme Song"	2006	—N/a
"I Wanna Be Like You"	2007	—N/a
"Kids of the Future"	2007	Declan Whitebloom
"Year 3000"	2007	Andrew Bennett
"Hold On"	2007	Declan Whitebloom
"SOS"	2007	Declan Whitebloom
"When You Look Me in the Eyes"	2008	Robert Hales
"Burnin' Up"	2008	Brendan Malloy and Tim Wheeler
"Lovebug"	2008	Philip Andelman
"Tonight"	2009	Bruce Hendricks
"BB Good"	2009	Bruce Hendricks
"Love Is on Its Way"	2009	—N/a
"Bounce"	2009	JBD Productions Music
"Send It On"	2009	F. Michael Blum
"Paranoid"	2009	Brendan Malloy and Tim Wheeler
"Fly with Me"	2009	Bill Condon
"It's On"	2010	Brandon Dickerson
"Pom Poms"	2013	Marc Klasfeld
"First Time"	2013	ENDS
"Sucker"	2019	Anthony Mandler
"Cool"	2019	Anthony Mandler
"Runaway"	2019	Daniel Duran
"Only Human"	2019	Anthony Mandler
"Lonely"	2019	Brandon Dermer
"What A Man Gotta Do"	2020	Joseph Kahn
"What a Man Gotta Do"(Vegas Ride)	2020	—N/a
"X"	2020	Josh Rimmey and Zach Williams
"Leave Before You Love Me"	2021	Christian Breslauer
"Remember This"	2021	—N/a
"Who's In Your Head"	2021	Christian Breslauer
"Wings"	2023	Josh Rimmey and Zach Williams
"Waffle House"	2023	Anthony Mandler
"Do It Like That"	2023	Yongsoo Kwon
