= Greetings from Your Hometown =

2025 studio album by Jonas Brothers

- Standard cover

Studio album by Jonas Brothers
- Released: August 8, 2025
- Studios: The Orange Lounge (Toronto); House of Blues (Los Angeles); Vinegar Hill Sound (Brooklyn); Melody League (Carlsbad); Jungle City (New York City); Deerfield (Los Angeles); PWZ Custom Recordings (La Crescenta-Montrose)
- Length: 45:27
- Label: Republic
- Producers: Alex Borel; Alexander 23; Colin Foote; Cook Classics; Dean Lewis; Digital Farm Animals; Gabe Simon; Hazey Eyes; Jason Evigan; Jeremy Hatcher; Julian Bunetta; Jordan Riley; Josette Maskin; Joshua Murty; Mark Schick; Marshmello; Mike Elizondo; Nolan Sipe; Ryan Daly; Ryan Tedder; The Monsters & Strangerz; Tommy English

Jonas Brothers chronology
Live from the O2 London (2025)	Greetings from Your Hometown (2025)	A Very Jonas Christmas Movie (Original Soundtrack) (2025)

Singles from Greetings from Your Hometown
- 1. "Love Me to Heaven" Released: March 21, 2025; 2. "No Time to Talk" Released: June 20, 2025; 3. "I Can't Lose" Released: July 15, 2025

Greetings from Your Hometown is the seventh studio album by the American pop rock band Jonas Brothers. It was released on August 8, 2025, through Republic Records. The album contains guest appearances from Dean Lewis, Switchfoot, and Marshmello. Production was handled by Lewis and Marshmello themselves, alongside Ryan Daly, Cook Classics, Jordan Riley, Joshua Murty, Julian Bunetta, Gabe Simon, Mark Schick, Nolan Sipe, Colin Foote, Alex Borel, Alexander 23, Hazey Eyes, Tommy English, Jeremy Hatcher, Josette Maskin, the Monsters & Strangerz, Ryan Tedder, Jason Evigan, Mike Elizondo, Digital Farm Animals, Connor McDonough, and Earwulf. It serves as the follow-up to the band's sixth studio album, The Album (2023).

The album was supported by the release of three singles, "Love Me to Heaven", released on March 21, "No Time to Talk", released on June 20, 2025, and "I Can't Lose", released on July 15, 2025. To promote the album, as well as their 20 years as a band, the brothers embarked on the Jonas20: Greetings from Your Hometown Tour, which commenced on August 10, 2025, with a concert at the MetLife Stadium, in East Rutherford, New Jersey, and is set to conclude on December 22, 2025, at Barclays Center, in Brooklyn, New York, consisting of 74 concerts.

== Background ==
Greetings from Your Hometown really is a love letter to our roots musically and to our home state of New Jersey — there's a heavy influence of Bruce Springsteen and storytelling behind some of the greats from the state. But also, it's just about coming back to those roots. We are a family at our core, more than a band or anything else. Any time we come back to that feeling of playing music in our living room in Jersey, it's a great feeling.

— Nick Jonas on developing the album, via interview with Ticketmaster

On December 31, 2024, the Jonas Brothers were briefly interviewed by Ryan Seacrest in New York City's Times Square, right before their New Year's Eve performance at Dick Clark's New Year's Rockin' Eve, during which Nick Jonas announced a collaboration with American record producer Marshmello, set to be release in January 2025. "Slow Motion" was released on January 17, 2025, and debuted at number four on the Billboard Hot Dance/Electronic Songs chart. Aside from the new song, the brothers hinted that, in 2025, they would release new music and go on a big tour, whilst also teasing "a ton of announcements coming".

On March 13, 2025, the Jonas Brothers announced the release of the song "Love Me to Heaven", which serves as the lead single for their upcoming seventh studio album. The song was first previewed on February 15, 2025, during the band's Massey Hall concert, which intended to kickstart their 20th anniversary celebrations.

During JonasCon, a fan convention held by the band to celebrate the 20th anniversary of the Jonas Brothers, the band announced some upcoming projects, which included their upcoming tour, Jonas20: Greetings from Your Hometown Tour, their seventh studio album, Greetings from Your Hometown, released on August 8, 2025, a Disney+ Christmas movie, called A Very Jonas Christmas Movie, as well as a live album, Live from the O2 London.

== Release and promotion ==
On May 29, 2025, the Jonas Brothers confirmed the release of Greetings from Your Hometown and revealed its cover artwork. It was first announced during the band's 20th anniversary celebration at JonasCon. The album was released on August 8, 2025, via Republic Records.

=== Singles ===
The lead single of the album, "Love Me to Heaven", was released on March 21, 2025, ahead of JonasCon, as part of the celebrations for the 20th anniversary of the Jonas Brothers. Ten days later, the Jonas Brothers released the first of two music videos for the song, which features its three members in a retro recording session.

The second single, "No Time to Talk", was released on June 20, 2025, and was produced by Julian Bunetta and Gabe Simon. The disco-pop track features an interpolation of the Bee Gees' 1977 song "Stayin' Alive", in both song and lyrics, as the brothers had disclosed on previous occasions, that they were inspired by the band. The single was serviced to US contemporary hit radio on the same day.

"I Can't Lose" was released as the album's third single on July 15, 2025. The band performed the song live, as part of partnership with Mastercard, in support of the Stand Up to Cancer campaign. The music video for the song was filmed during the live performance for the event, and premiered in the same day. The video showcases the band performing for a group of fans on a rooftop.

=== Live concert ===
On May 2, 2025, the Jonas Brothers were announced as performers on the 30th-anniversary lineup for Today's Citi Concert Series. The band's concert took place at the Rockefeller Plaza, outside of Today's New York studio, on August 8, 2025.

=== Tour ===
The brothers announced they would embark on a concert tour, originally titled Jonas20: Living the Dream Tour. The tour was created in celebration of the 20th anniversary of the Jonas Brothers. The band announced 43 concerts across North America, starting on August 10, 2025, with a concert at the MetLife Stadium, in East Rutherford, New Jersey, and concluding on November 14, 2025, in Uncasville, Connecticut, with the All-American Rejects, Boys Like Girls and Marshmello serving as supporting acts on select dates. The tour was later rebranded as Jonas20: Greetings from Your Hometown Tour, with more dates being added to a total of 52 shows.

== Critical reception ==
Professional ratings
Review scores
Source	Rating
AllMusic	4/5 stars

Greetings from Your Hometown received positive reviews from critics. Writing for Melodic Magazine, Reagan Denning complimented the record for its stripped back production and 1970s influence, which made the record feel nostalgic, mixing the band's "signature pop charm with rich textures and grooves". Tim Strong of Showbiz by PS described the album as "an unquestionable improvement" over the band's previous release, The Album, noting that "while the music is still pretty generic in a lot of places, it does more than enough to justify its existence".

== Commercial performance ==
In the United States, Greetings from Your Hometown debuted at number six on the Billboard 200, earning 39,000 album-equivalent units (including 26,000 in pure album sales) in its first week. This became the Jonas Brothers' eighth top ten album on the chart. The album also accumulated a total of 16.49 million on-demand streams of the album's songs.

== Track listing ==
Greetings from Your Hometown track listing
No.	Title	Writer(s)	Producer(s)	Length
1.	"I Can't Lose"	Nicholas Jonas; John Sudduth; Paris Carney; Ryan Daly	Daly	3:03
2.	"Tables"	N. Jonas; Joseph Jonas; Kevin Jonas II; William Lobban-Bean; Jordan Riley; Carney	Cook Classics; Riley	3:33
3.	"Love Me to Heaven"	N. Jonas; Justin Tranter; Ferras Alqaisi; Ryland Blackinton; Sara Boe; Joshua Murty	Murty	3:26
4.	"No Time to Talk"	N. Jonas; Julian Bunetta; Gabe Simon; Steph Jones; Barry Gibb; Robin Gibb; Maurice Gibb	Bunetta; Simon	2:35
5.	"Backwards"	Grace Barker; Benjamin Ingrosso; Lionel Crasta; Mark Schick	Schick	3:00
6.	"Loved You Better" (with Dean Lewis)	Lewis; Hayley Warner; Nolan Sipe	Lewis; Sipe; Colin Foote; Alex Borel	2:37
7.	"Greetings from Your Hometown" (with Switchfoot)	N. Jonas; Jon Foreman; Tim Foreman; Lobban-Bean; Riley; Carney	Cook Classics; Riley	3:30
8.	"When You Know"	N. Jonas; Tranter; Alexander Glantz; Thomas Michel	Alexander 23; Hazey Eyes	4:29
9.	"Heat of the Moment"	J. Jonas; Tommy English; Josette Maskin; Glantz	English; Jeremy Hatcher	4:22
10.	"Bully"	N. Jonas; J. Jonas; English; Tranter; Maskin; Sudduth; Carney	English; Maskin	3:13
11.	"Waste No Time"	N. Jonas; K. Jonas; Ryan Tedder; Jordan K. Johnson; Stefan Johnson	Tedder; The Monsters & Strangerz	2:55
12.	"Lucky"	N. Jonas; J. Jonas; J. Johnson; S. Johnson; Jason Evigan; Mike Elizondo; Sean Douglas; Amy Wadge	The Monsters & Strangerz; Evigan; Elizondo	2:49
13.	"Mirror to the Sky"	Bianca Atterberry; Pablo Bowman; Schick; Murty	Schick; Murty	3:23
14.	"Slow Motion" (with Marshmello)	Christopher Comstock; Nicholas Gale; Connor McDonough; Riley McDonough; Thomas Eriksen; Jake Torrey; Mat Davis	Marshmello; Digital Farm Animals; C. McDonough; Earwulf	2:31
Total length:				45:27

Deluxe edition bonus tracks
No.	Title	Writer(s)	Producer(s)	Length
15.	"Tantrum"	Jones; Madison Love; John Byron; Dallas Koehlke	DallasK	2:50
16.	"Love Me to Heaven" (acoustic)	N. Jonas; Tranter; Alqaisi; Blackinton; Boe; Murty	Murty	3:22
Total length:				51:38

Target-exclusive track listing
No.	Title	Writer(s)	Producer(s)	Length
10.	"Slow Motion" (with Marshmello)	Comstock; Gale; C. McDonough; R. McDonough; Eriksen; Torrey; Davis	Marshmello; Digital Farm Animals; C. McDonough; Earwulf	2:31
11.	"Star"	N. Jonas; Greg Kurstin; Maureen "Mozella" McDonald	Kurstin	3:44
Total length:				36:50

Notes

- "No Time to Talk" contains an interpolation of "Stayin' Alive", written by Barry Gibb, Robin Gibb, and Maurice Gibb, as performed by the Bee Gees.
- Tracks 10–13 are exclusive to the digital and streaming editions of the album.
- The Greetings From Our Hometown limited deluxe album features live recordings of "Beautiful Soul" (featuring Jesse McCartney), "No Time to Talk", "I Can't Lose", "Loved You Better" (featuring Dean Lewis) and "Love Me to Heaven", recorded at the MetLife Stadium, from the Jonas20: Greetings from Your Hometown Tour, as bonus tracks.

== Personnel ==
=== Jonas Brothers ===
- Nick Jonas – vocals (all tracks), background vocals (3)
- Joe Jonas – vocals (all tracks), background vocals (9)
- Kevin Jonas – guitar (all tracks), background vocals (2, 7)

=== Additional musicians ===
- Mikky Ekko – background vocals (1)
- Ryan Daly – guitar, bass, horn, drums, percussion, keyboard (1)
- Michael Deleasa – background vocals (1)
- Cook Classics – background vocals, bass, drum kit, percussion, keyboard, synthesizer (2, 7); guitar, sitar (7)
- Jordan Riley – background vocals, bass, drum kit (2, 7); keyboard, strings (2); brass (7); guitar (7)
- Paris Carney – background vocals (2, 7)
- Ken Riley – electric guitar (2)
- Joshua Murty – background vocals, electric guitar, keyboard (3, 13); 12-string acoustic guitar, bass, synthesizer, synth bass (3); acoustic guitar (13)
- Aaron Sterling – drums, percussion (3)
- Julian Bunetta – guitar, drums, percussion, keyboard, synth bass (4)
- Gabe Simon – guitar, bass, keyboard, string arrangement (4)
- Ben Kaufmann – violin, viola (4)
- Gracey – background vocals (5)
- Benjamin Ingrosso – background vocals (5)
- Mark Schick – background vocals, electric guitar, drum kit, keyboard (5, 13); acoustic guitar, bass (5)
- Lionel Crasta – bass, keyboard (5)
- Dean Lewis – vocals, acoustic guitar (6)
- Nolan Sipe – piano, synthesizer (6)
- Colin Foote – drum programming (6)
- Alex Borel – piano, synthesizer, drum programming (6)
- Switchfoot
  - Jon Foreman – vocals, guitar, keyboard (7)
  - Tim Foreman – background vocals, bass, keyboard (7)
  - Chad Butler – background vocals, drum kit (7)
- Alexander 23 – background vocals (8, 9); acoustic guitar, electric guitar, bass, synthesizer (8); 12-string acoustic guitar (9)
- Hazey Eyes – acoustic guitar, electric guitar, synthesizer, piano (8)
- Yasmeen Al-Mazeedi – strings (8)
- Tommy English – bass (9, 10); background vocals, slide guitar, drum kit (9); electric guitar (10)
- Josette Maskin – background vocals, electric guitar (9, 10)
- Jeremy Hatcher – acoustic guitar, electric guitar, bass, drum kit, synthesizer (10)
- The Monsters & Strangerz
  - Jordan K. Johnson – drum kit, keyboard (11, 12); guitar, bass, percussion (11)
  - Stefan Johnson – drum kit, keyboard (11, 12); guitar, bass, percussion (11)
- Ryan Tedder – guitar, bass, drum kit, percussion, keyboard (11)
- Mike Elizondo – bass (12)
- David Angell – violin (12)
- David Davidson – violin (12)
- Paul Nelson – cello (12)
- Elizabeth Lamb – viola (12)
- Brandon Michael Collins – string arrangement (12)
- Blush – background vocals (13)
- Pablo Bowman – background vocals (13)
- Marshmello – guitar, bass, drum kit, percussion, keyboard, horn, strings (14)
- Digital Farm Animals – guitar, bass, drum kit, percussion, keyboard, horn, strings (14)
- Connor McDonough – guitar, bass, drum kit, percussion, keyboard, horn, strings (14)

=== Technical ===
- Spike Stent – mixing (1, 7, 9, 10)
- Dale Becker – mastering (1)
- Katie Harvey – secondary mastering (1)
- Nate Mingo – additional engineering (1)
- Michael Deleasa – secondary engineering (1), vocal engineering (3, 6)
- Darren Parkinson – secondary engineering, vocal editing (1)
- Serban Ghenea – mixing (2–6, 11, 12)
- Randy Merrill – mastering (2, 5–10)
- Desiree da Silva – recording (2, 6, 9), additional engineering (4), secondary engineering (6, 9)
- Cook Classics – programming (2, 7), engineering (7)
- Jordan Riley – programming (2, 7), engineering (7)
- Anthony Yordanov – vocal editing (2, 4, 6, 9)
- Joshua Murty – engineering, programming (3, 13); digital editing (3); vocal production (13)
- Aaron Sterling – engineering (3)
- Bryce Bordone – co-mixing (3)
- Ferras – vocal arrangement (3)
- Jesse String – vocal engineering (3)
- Julian Bunetta – engineering, programming (4)
- Gabe Simon – engineering (4)
- Jeff Gunnell – engineering (4)
- Nathan Dantzler – mastering (4)
- Harrison Tate – secondary mastering (4)
- Mark Schick – engineering, programming (5, 13); vocal production (5)
- Lionel Crasta – engineering, programming, vocal production (5)
- Erik Belz – recording, second engineering (5)
- Nolan Sipe – engineering (6)
- Colin Foote – engineering (6)
- Alex Borel – engineering (6)
- Tanner Sparks – engineering (7)
- Jeremy Cimino – vocal engineering (7), recording (11, 12); engineering (13)
- Alexander 23 – engineering (8)
- Jon Castelli – mixing (8)
- Tommy English – engineering (9, 10)
- Jeremy Hatcher – engineering (9, 10)
- The Monsters & Strangerz
  - Jordan K. Johnson – programming (11, 12)
  - Stefan Johnson – programming (11, 12)
- Ryan Tedder – programming (11, 12)
- Mike Elizondo – programming (12)
- Doug Sarrett – recording (12)
- Jackson Rau – engineering (13)
- Earwulf – audio concept (14)
- Manny Marroquin – mixing (14)
- Zach Pereyra – mastering (14)
- Piéce Eatah – recording (14)

== Charts ==
Chart performance for Greetings from Your Hometown
Chart (2025)	Peak position
Australian Albums (ARIA)	93
Belgian Albums (Ultratop Flanders)	56
Belgian Albums (Ultratop Wallonia)	195
Canadian Albums (Billboard)	55
Dutch Albums (Album Top 100)	63
French Albums (SNEP)	138
Scottish Albums (Official Charts)	63
UK Albums Sales (OCC)	26
US Billboard 200	6

== Release history ==
Greetings from Your Hometown release history
Region	Date	Format(s)	Edition(s)	Label	Ref.
Various	August 8, 2025	CD; digital download; streaming; vinyl LP	Standard	Republic	
United States	August 8, 2025	CD; vinyl LP	Target-exclusive	Republic	
United States	August 8, 2025	CD	US States signed letters	Republic	
Various	August 8, 2025	CD; vinyl LP	International signed letters	Republic	
Various	August 12, 2025	Digital download; streaming	Deluxe Edition	Republic	
Various	August 14, 2025	Digital download	Limited Deluxe Edition (Note: Greetings From Our Hometown Deluxe Album)	Republic	
