= No Time to Talk =

2025 single by Jonas Brothers

Single by Jonas Brothers

from the album Greetings from Your Hometown
- Released: June 20, 2025
- Genre: Disco-pop
- Length: 2:35
- Label: Republic
- Songwriters: Nicholas Jonas; Julian Bunetta; Gabe Simon; Steph Jones; Barry Gibb; Robin Gibb; Maurice Gibb
- Producers: Bunetta; Simon

Jonas Brothers singles chronology
"Love Me to Heaven" (2025)	"No Time to Talk" (2025)	"I Can't Lose" (2025)

Lyric video
- "No Time to Talk" on YouTube

"No Time to Talk" is a song by American pop rock group Jonas Brothers. It was released through Republic Records as the second single from their seventh studio album, Greetings from Your Hometown, on June 20, 2025.

== Background ==
On March 13, 2025, the Jonas Brothers announced the release of "Love Me to Heaven", which serves as the lead single for their upcoming seventh studio album. The song was previewed on February 15, 2025, during the band's Massey Hall concert, which intended to kickstart their 20th anniversary celebrations.

== Release ==
The second single, "No Time to Talk", was released on June 20, 2025, and was produced by Julian Bunetta and Gabe Simon.

== Composition and lyrics ==
The disco-pop song features an interpolation of Bee Gees's 1977 song "Stayin' Alive" in both song and lyrics, as the brothers had disclosed on previous occasions that they were inspired by the band. They have also credited the band as the track's songwriters.

== Charts ==
=== Weekly charts ===
Weekly chart performance for "No Time to Talk"
Chart (2025–2026)	Peak position
Argentina Anglo Airplay (Monitor Latino)	10
Central America Anglo Airplay (Monitor Latino)	15
CIS Airplay (TopHit)	98
Croatia International Airplay (Top lista)	49
Czech Republic Airplay (ČNS IFPI)	4
Ecuador Anglo Airplay (Monitor Latino)	6
Lithuania Airplay (TopHit)	20
Malta Airplay (Radiomonitor)	10
Mexico Anglo Airplay (Monitor Latino)	16
Nicaragua Anglo Airplay (Monitor Latino)	3
North Macedonia Airplay (Radiomonitor)	2
Panama Anglo Airplay (Monitor Latino)	8
Peru Airplay (Monitor Latino)	13
Poland Airplay (OLiS)	9
Portugal Airplay (AFP)	33
Romania Airplay (UPFR)	9
Romania Airplay (Media Forest)	10
Romania TV Airplay (Media Forest)	19
Slovakia Airplay (ČNS IFPI)	3
Suriname (Nationale Top 40)	20
Uruguay Anglo Airplay (Monitor Latino)	11
US Bubbling Under Hot 100 (Billboard)	23
US Adult Contemporary (Billboard)	22
US Adult Pop Airplay (Billboard)	16
US Pop Airplay (Billboard)	27
Venezuela Airplay (Record Report)	49

=== Monthly charts ===
Monthly chart performance for "No Time to Talk"
Chart (2025–2026)	Peak position
Lithuania Airplay (TopHit)	24
Romania Airplay (TopHit)	16

=== Year-end charts ===
Year-end chart performance
Chart (2025)	Position
Argentina Anglo Airplay (Monitor Latino)	98
Romania Airplay (TopHit)	89
Poland (Polish Airplay Top 100)	79

== Release history ==
Release history for "No Time to Talk"
Region	Date	Format	Label	Ref.
Various	June 20, 2025	Digital download; streaming	Republic	
United States	June 20, 2025	Contemporary hit radio	Republic	
