= I Can't Lose (Jonas Brothers song) =

2025 single by Jonas Brothers

Single by Jonas Brothers

from the album Greetings from Your Hometown
- Released: July 15, 2025
- Length: 3:03
- Label: Republic
- Songwriters: Nicholas Jonas; Joseph Jonas; Kevin Jonas II; Mikky Ekko; Paris Carney; Ryan Daly
- Producer: Daly

Jonas Brothers singles chronology
"No Time to Talk" (2025)	"I Can't Lose" (2025)	"Happen to Me" (2025)

Music video
- "I Can't Lose" on YouTube

"I Can't Lose" is a song by American pop rock group Jonas Brothers. It was released through Republic Records as the third single from their seventh studio album, Greetings from Your Hometown, on July 15, 2025.

== Background ==
On March 13, 2025, the Jonas Brothers announced the release of "Love Me to Heaven", which serves as the lead single for their upcoming seventh studio album. The song was previewed on February 15, 2025, during the band's Massey Hall concert, which intended to kickstart their 20th anniversary celebrations.

The second single, "No Time to Talk", was released on June 20, 2025, and was produced by Julian Bunetta and Gabe Simon.

== Release ==
"I Can't Lose" was released as the album's third single on July 15, 2025. The band performed the song live, as part of partnership with Mastercard, in support of the Stand Up to Cancer campaign.

== Music video ==
There are two music videos for the song. The first one was filmed during the live performance for the event sponsored by Mastercard, and premiered in the same day.

The second one, being the "official version", was filmed in New York City in partnership with Google Pixel. The music video was entirely filmed with the Google Pixel 10 Pro, which was announced during the Made by Google Event on August 20, 2025.

== Release history ==
Release history for "I Can't Lose"
Region	Date	Format	Label	Ref.
Various	July 15, 2025	Digital download; streaming	Republic	
