= JonasCon =

2025 fan convention hosted by the Jonas Brothers

- Promotional poster for the event
- Date: March 23, 2025
- Venue: American Dream Way
- Location: East Rutherford, New Jersey, U.S.; 40°48′36″N 74°04′03″W
- Type: Fan convention
- Theme: 20 years of Jonas Brothers
- Website: jonasbrothers.com/jonas-con

JonasCon was the one-time-only fan convention, created to celebrate the 20th anniversary of the American pop rock band Jonas Brothers. Dubbed as the "Ultimate Jonas Brothers Fan Experience", the event took place on March 23, 2025, at the American Dream Way shopping mall, located in East Rutherford, New Jersey, the band's home state.

All activities in the event alluded to the Jonas Brothers' career, highlighting memories from both the Jonas family and fans. Amongst them were performances by the Jonas Brothers, the All-American Rejects, Big Time Rush, and Boys Like Girls, along with merchandise, themed drinks and snacks.

During JonasCon, the band announced some upcoming projects, which included their upcoming tour, Jonas20: Greetings from Your Hometown, their seventh studio album, Greetings from Your Hometown, a Disney+ movie, called A Very Jonas Christmas Movie, a live album, as well as the track list and release date for Joe Jonas' sophomore solo studio album, Music for People Who Believe in Love.

Subsequently, the Jonas Brothers announced that JonasCon would be available on the stadium dates of the tour, starting on August 10, at the MetLife Stadium, and ending on September 6, 2025, at the Dodger Stadium. These new dates would feature the convention in the form of pre-show events, free for all the ticket holders.

== Background and announcement ==
To our incredible fans, as a family, we have been reflecting a lot lately [...] It's been 20 years since we started this journey together. To us, it feels like just yesterday we were loading up our family mini-van with a couple of guitars and copies of It's About Time CDs, en route to an afternoon performance at a local to play for anyone who would listen. We were chasing our dream to play music and connect with others in a deep way that only music can provide. We were teenagers then.. actually, Nick wasn't even old enough to get into a PG-13 movie [...] We treasure our connection with you as much today as we did when we played our first show. We are celebrating this wild 20-year journey by doing what we love, and we can't wait to share it with you.

— Jonas Brothers on a letter addressed to their fans, dated February 12, 2025, posted on the band's social media accounts.

Ahead of their performance on the 2025 Dick Clark's New Year's Rockin' Eve special in New York City, the Jonas Brothers started teasing their plans for the new year, which marked the 20th anniversary of the band. During an interview with Ryan Seacrest, the brothers said they were preparing "a ton of announcements", which included a tour and new music. The performance started just after midnight, with the setlist consisting of their 2019 comeback single, "Sucker", "Play My Music", from the Camp Rock soundtrack, and a cover of the Cranberries's song, "Dreams".

On February 12, 2025, the Jonas Brothers posted on their social media accounts a video and a letter addressed to their fans, announcing the plans for the band in 2025, which marked the 20th anniversary of the band. At the convention, some of the activities planned were live performances, DJ sets, Q&A panels, fan activations, pop-up surprises, immersive experiences, special guest appearances and many other surprises.

The location for the convention was chosen as a nod to the band's early years, where they would perform at local malls. Attendees who register for JonasCon at the band's website got first access to Jonas Brothers-themed events happening across New York City on March 22 and at the American Dream on the 23rd. The tickets for the Saturday activities were limited and available exclusively to registered attendees, on a "first-come, first-served basis".

On the aforementioned video, the trio tapped into the nostalgia, presenting a compilation in which displays memories from the band over the years, including clips from the Disney Channel Original Movie, Camp Rock (2008), old YouTube videos posted by the band, their star on the walk of fame and other significant moments with the fans throughout their career.

Initially, the announcement letter caused fear among the fans, who reported that, at first glance, the message resembled their break up announcement on October 29, 2013. Fans started posting across social media their reactions to first reading the post, with reactions depicting fear and relief, once they realized the content of the letter. The entertainment website, Collider, remarked that, despite the initial reactions caused by the letter, the announcement sparkled an "incredibly heartfelt sentiment", when the group made it clear that 2025 would be a "year of music" for the band.

== Concept and content ==
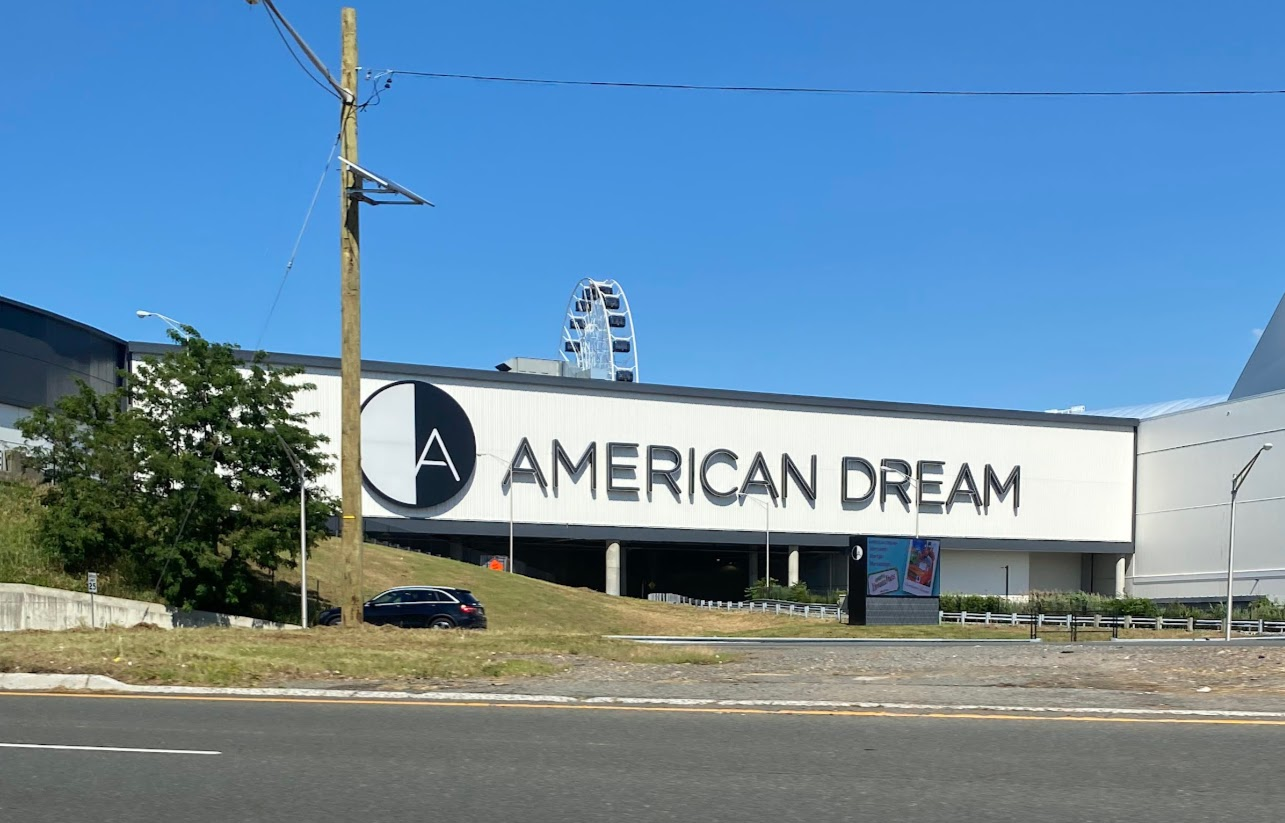
Entrance to American Dream from Route 120 in East Rutherford, New Jersey.

The convention is themed around the 20th anniversary of the Jonas Brothers as a band. All activities and performances aim to celebrate the 20 years since the group formation. The event took place at the American Dream Way shopping mall, located in East Rutherford, New Jersey, the band's home state, and was chosen as a nod to the band's early days performing at malls.

On March 6, 2025, the Jonas Brothers announced they would play two sets at JonasCon. One of the performances featured the original 2007 band, and took place at the Rink, an indoor ice skating rink, at American Dream. The line-up featured American rock band the All-American Rejects, the Jonas' younger brother Frankie Jonas, along with special guest appearance by Jay Shetty and a live "Chicks in the Office" podcast. The convention also featured 21-and-over performances by the Jonas Brothers, Joe Jonas, DNCE, Nick Jonas, the band's former security guard, Big Rob, and Kevin Jonas' brother-in-law, Deleasa, and took place at the American Dream Waterpark.

=== Radio stations ticket contests ===
On the weeks leading up to the event, multiple American radio stations created contests for audience members to have the chance to win VIP tickets to JonasCon. The New 96.5 FM from Philadelphia, Star 99.9 FM from Bridgeport, 94.3 FM The Point from Asbury Park, 94.5 PST from Trenton, and 106.7 Lite FM from New York City were among the stations that created the contests. Z100 New York created a "Jonas Brothers look alike contest", where audiences were to submit their photographs impersonating the band members for a live evaluation that took place at the Empire State Building, on March 21, 2025.

=== Tour pre-show events ===
On March 25, 2025, the Jonas Brothers announced that they would be taking JonasCon on the road for stadium concerts of the Jonas20: Greetings from Your Hometown Tour, starting on August 10, at the MetLife Stadium, and ending on September 6, 2025, at the Dodger Stadium. These ten new dates will feature the convention in the form of pre-show events, free for all the ticket holders.

== Activities ==
Activities and events at the convention included live performances from the Jonas Brothers, the All-American Rejects, Big Time Rush, and Boys Like Girls; retail takeovers; JonasCon trading post; Q&A panels and trivia games; a keynote event; interactive and immersive art installation; karaoke; DJ sets; special guests (including Deleasa and Camp Rock cast members; a Camp Rock themed bar; Z100 broadcast; Jonas pizza; exclusive merchandising; miniature golf; dream wheel; Jonas Museum; the 2005 Jonas van signing; a fan portrait studio; JonasCon game room; giveaways; laser tag; shake by the Ocean Milkshake Bar; a escape room; Nellie's Southern Kitchen; and jewelry stand for Danielle Jonas Co.

== Other 20th anniversary celebrations ==
The Jonas Brothers announced that, in 2025, they would celebrate their 20th anniversary with a lot of surprises for the fans. Along with the JonasCon announcement, the brothers also teased that they would be releasing new Jonas Brothers music, solo music, a live concert album, and a soundtrack, with other surprises yet to be revealed.

=== Massey Hall concert ===
Poster for the 20th anniversary concert held by the Jonas Brothers at the Massey Hall, in Toronto, on February 15, 2025.

On February 15, 2025, to kickstart the celebrations, the Jonas Brothers performed a concert at Massey Hall, in Toronto. The concert was conceptualized around the 20th anniversary theme: "20 years. 20 songs. 2,000 tickets. 20:00 ET. $20". During the event, the brothers took song requests from the fans, and performed songs spanning their entire career, along with solo Nick Jonas and DNCE songs. The 2019 single, "Like It's Christmas", was incorporated to the set list, in order for the event to be used for filming some scenes for their upcoming Christmas movie, set to be released at the end of 2025, on Disney+.

=== Joe's Pizza ===
On March 22, 2025, the Jonas Brothers partnered with New York's traditional pizzeria Joe's Pizza, in anticipation for the convention. The store, located in Greenwich Village, Manhattan, New York City, was remodeled to display a changed logo, "Jonas Pizza". Apart from the pizzas, the store sold merchandise and custom items, all related to the band. The band members, alongside younger brother, Frankie Jonas, and Deleasa were present for the event.

=== Tour ===
The brothers appeared on Good Morning America on March 21, 2025, in anticipation for JonasCon. During the interview, they announced a 20th anniversary-themed tour, originally called Jonas20: Living the Dream Tour. The tour is set to begin in August 2025, with a concert at the MetLife Stadium, in New Jersey. The venue was chosen as a representation of a "full circle" for the band, who started their careers performing in small venues and shopping malls in the city. During JonasCon, they announced 43 concerts across North America with the All-American Rejects, Boys Like Girls and Marshmello serving as supporting acts on select dates. It was revealed that, in addition to the band's own music, solo projects from Joe and Nick Jonas, the Administration, Deleasa and DNCE will be performed during the concert.

=== Music releases ===
On March 13, 2025, the Jonas Brothers announced the single "Love Me to Heaven", which was released on March 21, 2025, through Republic Records. The song was first teased on February 15, at the Massey Hall concert, and is part of the band's 20th anniversary celebration. During an interview for Good Morning America, Nick revealed that the song serves as a lead single for their upcoming seventh studio album, Greetings from Your Hometown, set to be released on August 8, 2025, with more informations being revealed during the convention.
