= Live from the O2 London =

2025 live album by Jonas Brothers

Live album by Jonas Brothers
- Released: June 13, 2025
- Recorded: September 16–17, 2024
- Venue: The O2 Arena
- Length: 84:00
- Label: Republic
- Producer: Joe Jonas; Kevin Jonas; Nick Jonas

Jonas Brothers chronology
The Album (2023)	Live from the O2 London (2025)	Greetings from Your Hometown (2025)

Live from the O2 London is the third live album by the American pop rock band Jonas Brothers, released on June 13, 2025, through Republic Records. The album was recorded at the O2 Arena, during the September 16–17, 2024 concerts of the Five Albums. One Night. The World Tour (2023–24). It features twenty four live tracks spawning the band's career, their solo songs, DNCE, a Cranberries cover, as well as a then yet-to-be-released song from their seventh studio album, Greetings from Your Hometown (2025). The record received posivite reviews from critics for its energetic performances and the band's vocals.

== Background ==
The Jonas Brothers released their sixth studio album, titled The Album, on May 12, 2023. Plans for a new tour began as soon as the band started producing the record. On May 2, 2023, the tour, Five Albums. One Night. The World Tour, was officially announced to support and perform all songs from The Album, as well as perform all songs from their previous four albums: Jonas Brothers (2007), A Little Bit Longer (2008), Lines, Vines and Trying Times (2009) and Happiness Begins (2019) at every concert.

The tour's set list was composed of over 67 songs from the five studio albums released by the band between 2007 and 2023, as well as the standalone singles, "What a Man Gotta Do", "Leave Before You Love Me", and "Remember This", as well as Nick Jonas' "Jealous" and DNCE's "Cake by the Ocean".

== Release ==
The Jonas Brothers announced that, in 2025, they would celebrate their 20th anniversary with a lot of surprises for the fans, including a fan convention, titled JonasCon, which took place in the band's home state, New Jersey, on March 23, 2025. Along with the JonasCon announcement, the brothers also teased that they would be releasing new Jonas Brothers music, solo music, a live concert album, and a soundtrack, with other surprises that were yet to be revealed.

Live from the O2 London was released on June 13, 2025, through Republic Records. It was recorded in London, at the O2 Arena, during the September 16–17, 2024 concerts of the Five Albums. One Night. The World Tour. The live album features twenty four tracks spawning the band's career, their solo songs, DNCE, a Cranberries cover, as well as a then yet-to-be-released song from their seventh studio album, Greetings from Your Hometown, which was released on August 8, 2025.

== Critical reception ==
Live from the O2 London received positive reviews from critics. Writing for Melodic Magazine, Shauna Hilferty highlighted the album's nostalgia and career spawning track list, as well as the energetic tone, which lasts throughout the entirety of the record. She also commented positively on Nick and Joe Jonas' vocals and the instrumentals of the live performances. Anisa Nandy of Soap Central wrote that the album was not just a "live show on a disc" but a "party of how they have grown, with well-loved songs and new hits that come alive in front of a loud crowd". She praised the band for their voices, interactions with the audiences and fun performances, which made the album showcase the Jonas Brothers "at their most full of life".

== Track listing ==
Live from the O2 London track listing
No.	Title	Writer(s)	Length
1.	"Intro"	Nicholas Jonas; John Sudduth; Ryan Daly; Paris Carney	2:19
2.	"Celebrate!"	N. Jonas; Joseph Jonas; Kevin Jonas II; Jonathan Bellion; Jordan K. Johnson; Stefan Johnson; Alexander Izquierdo; Peter Nappi; Jason Cornet; Michael Pollack	2:25
3.	"What a Man Gotta Do"	N. Jonas; J. Jonas; K. Jonas; Ryan Tedder; David Stewart; Jessica Agombar	5:18
4.	"S.O.S"	N. Jonas	3:06
5.	"That's Just the Way We Roll"	N. Jonas; J. Jonas; K. Jonas; William McCauley III	3:16
6.	"When You Look Me in the Eyes"	N. Jonas; J. Jonas; K. Jonas; Kevin Jonas Sr.; PJ Bianco; Raymond Boyd	3:55
7.	"Year 3000" (featuring Busted)	James Bourne; Charlie Simpson; Steve Robson; Matt Willis; Graham Jay	4:04
8.	"Summer Baby"	N. Jonas; J. Jonas; K. Jonas; Bellion; J. Johnson; S. Johnson; Nappi; Cornet; Pollack; Gregory Hein	2:54
9.	"Vacation Eyes"	N. Jonas; J. Jonas; K. Jonas; Bellion; Nappi; Cornet	3:26
10.	"Gotta Find You"	Adam Watts; Andy Dodd	1:43
11.	"Play My Music"	Kara DioGuardi; Mitch Allan	3:16
12.	"Lovebug"	N. Jonas; J. Jonas; K. Jonas	3:57
13.	"Burnin' Up"	N. Jonas; J. Jonas; K. Jonas	3:04
14.	"Waffle House"	N. Jonas; J. Jonas; K. Jonas; Bellion; Nappi; Cornet; Daniel Tashian; Ido Zmishlany; Johnny Simpson; Hein	2:24
15.	"When You Know"	N. Jonas; J. Jonas; K. Jonas	5:55
16.	"Fly with Me"	N. Jonas; J. Jonas; K. Jonas; Greg Garbowsky	3:19
17.	"Paranoid"	N. Jonas; J. Jonas; K. Jonas; Cathy Dennis; John Fields	2:49
18.	"Jealous"	N. Jonas; Nolan Lambroza; Simon Wilcox	3:46
19.	"Cake by the Ocean"	J. Jonas; Justin Tranter; Mattias Larsson; Robin Fredriksson	4:34
20.	"Walls"	N. Jonas; J. Jonas; K. Jonas; Bellion; Nappi; Cornet; Simpson; Clyde Lawrence; Jordan Cohen; Felicia Ferraro; Andrea Rosario; Douglas Davis	4:20
21.	"Only Human"	N. Jonas; J. Jonas; K. Jonas; Karl Schuster	3:13
22.	"Sucker"	N. Jonas; J. Jonas; K. Jonas; Tedder; Adam Feeney; Louis Bell	3:06
23.	"Leave Before You Love Me"	Marshmello; Alessandro Lindblad; Nicholas Gale; Heavy Mellow; Richard Boardman; Pablo Bowman; Geoff Morrow; Christian Arnold; David Martin; Phil Plested; William Vaughan	3:19
24.	"Dreams"	Dolores O'Riordan; Noel Hogan	4:22
Total length:			84:00

Notes

- Tracks 1–23 are subtitled "Live from the O2 London" and track 24 is subtitled "Live at SSE Arena Belfast".
- "Dreams" is a cover of the Cranberries song, written by Dolores O'Riordan and Noel Hogan.
- All tracks are produced by Joe, Kevin and Nick Jonas.

== Personnel ==
Credits adapted from Tidal.

=== Jonas Brothers ===
- Nick Jonas – vocals, piano, guitar
- Joe Jonas – vocals, guitar
- Kevin Jonas – vocals, guitar

=== Additional musicians ===
- Michael Sarian – trumpet
- Jeffery Miller – trombone
- Fabian Chavez – tenor saxophone
- Molly Lopresti – percussion
- Michael Wooten – keyboard
- Daniel Byrne – guitar
- JinJoo Lee – guitar
- Jack Lawless – drums
- Danica Pinner – cello
- Tyler Carroll – bass
- KellyAnn Rodgers – background vocals
- Mark Joseph – background vocals
- Gabi Rose – additional saxophone

=== Technical ===
- Splash of Soda – mixing, mastering
- Josh Florez – additional mixing

== Release history ==
Live from the O2 London release history
Region	Date	Format(s)	Label	Ref.
Various	June 13, 2025	Digital download; streaming	Republic	
