= Jonas Brothers =

American pop rock band

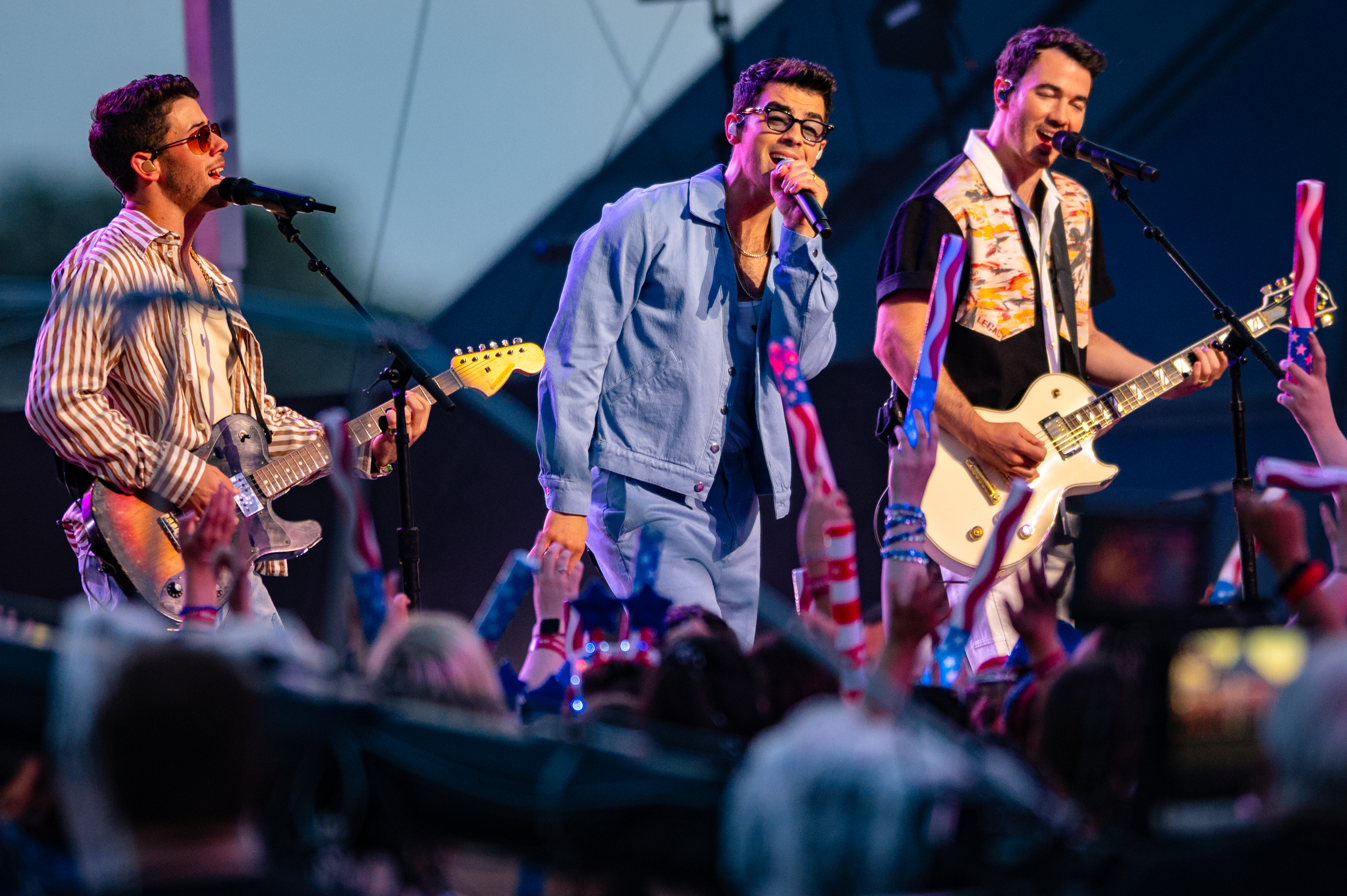
- Jonas Brothers performing in 2021; L–R: Nick, Joe, and Kevin

Background information
- Origin: Wyckoff, New Jersey, U.S.
- Genres: Pop rock; pop-punk; power pop
- Years active: 2005–2013; 2019–present
- Labels: INO; Daylight; Columbia; Hollywood; Republic
- Spinoffs: Nick Jonas & the Administration; DNCE
- Members: Joe Jonas; Kevin Jonas; Nick Jonas
- Website: jonasbrothers.com

The Jonas Brothers (/ˈdʒoʊnəs/) are an American pop rock band formed in 2005 comprising brothers Kevin Jonas, Joe Jonas, and Nick Jonas. Raised in Wyckoff, New Jersey, the Jonas Brothers moved to Little Falls, New Jersey, in 2005, where they wrote their first record that made its release on Hollywood Records, a Disney-owned record label, after which they gained popularity from their appearances on Disney Channel. They starred in the 2008 Disney Channel Original Movie Camp Rock and its 2010 sequel, Camp Rock 2: The Final Jam. They also starred in their own Disney Channel series Jonas, which was rebranded as Jonas L.A. for its second season. The band has released seven albums: It's About Time (2006), Jonas Brothers (2007), A Little Bit Longer (2008), Lines, Vines and Trying Times (2009), Happiness Begins (2019), The Album (2023) and Greetings from Your Hometown (2025).

In 2008, the group was nominated for the Best New Artist award at the 51st Annual Grammy Awards and won the award for Breakthrough Artist at the American Music Awards. Before the release of Lines, Vines and Trying Times, they had sold over eight million albums worldwide. After a hiatus between 2010 and 2011 to pursue solo projects, the group reunited in 2012 to record a new album, which was cancelled following their break-up on October 29, 2013. As of that year, they had sold over 17 million albums worldwide.

Six years following their split, the group reunited with the release of "Sucker" on March 1, 2019. The song became the 34th song in history to debut at number one on the Billboard Hot 100, and became the Jonas Brothers' first number one single on the chart. Their fifth studio album, Happiness Begins, was released on June 7, 2019, topping the US Billboard 200. The brothers released their sixth studio album, The Album, on May 12, 2023, preceded by two singles, "Waffle House" and "Wings". The 12-track record was produced by Jon Bellion. Their seventh studio album, Greetings from Your Hometown, was released on August 8, 2025.

== History ==
=== 2005–2007: It's About Time ===
In 2005, Joe, Kevin and Nick recorded "Please Be Mine", their first song recorded. Upon hearing the song, the Columbia Records president Steve Greenberg decided to sign the brothers as a group. They considered naming their group "Sons of Jonas" before settling on the name Jonas Brothers. While working on their debut studio album, the band toured throughout 2005 with artists such as Jump5, Kelly Clarkson, Jesse McCartney, the Backstreet Boys, and the Click Five, among others. They spent the latter portion of the year on a tour with Aly & AJ and the Cheetah Girls. Additionally, they opened for the Veronicas in early 2006. For their first album, titled It's About Time, the band collaborated with several writers, including Adam Schlesinger (Fountains of Wayne), Michael Mangini (Joss Stone), Desmond Child (Aerosmith, Bon Jovi), Billy Mann (Destiny's Child, Jessica Simpson) and Steve Greenberg. The album was initially supposed to be released in February 2006, but was pushed back several times, due to executive changes at Sony (the parent company of Columbia) and the executives' desire to have "another lead single" on the album. For the album, the Jonas Brothers covered two hit songs by UK band Busted – "Year 3000" and "What I Go to School For". The Jonas Brothers' first single, "Mandy", was released on December 27, 2005. Its music video was shown on MTV's Total Request Live on February 22, 2006, and reached number four. Another song, "Time for Me to Fly", was released on the Aquamarine soundtrack, also in February. In March, "Mandy" was featured in the Nickelodeon television film Zoey 101: Spring Break-Up and the Zoey 101: Music Mix soundtrack album, with Nicholas Jonas listed as the artist name. The group's music was also featured on Cartoon Network's Friday night programming block Fridays.

The band covered "Yo Ho (A Pirate's Life for Me)" from Pirates of the Caribbean for the Disneymania 4 album, released on April 4, 2006. Over the summer of 2006, the Jonas Brothers went on tour with Aly & AJ. The Jonas Brothers also created the theme song for the second season of American Dragon: Jake Long, airing from June 2006 to September 2007 on the Disney Channel. It's About Time was finally released on August 8, 2006. According to the band's manager, it was only a "limited release" of 50,000 copies, so the album's price can rise as high as US$200–US$300 on auction sites like eBay. Because Sony was not interested in further promoting the band, the Jonas Brothers considered switching labels. On October 3, 2006, Nick's 2004 solo single, "Joy to the World (A Christmas Prayer)", was re-released on Joy to the World: The Ultimate Christmas Collection. The same month, the Jonas Brothers covered "Poor Unfortunate Souls" from The Little Mermaid. Along with a music video, the song was released on a two-disc special-edition release of The Little Mermaid soundtrack. The second single from It's About Time was "Year 3000", the music video of which premiered on the Disney Channel in January 2007. The band was ultimately dropped by Columbia Records in early 2007.

=== 2007–2008: Jonas Brothers ===
After being without a label for a short time, the Jonas Brothers signed with Hollywood Records in February 2007. Around the same time, the brothers began appearing in commercials for Baby Bottle Pops, singing the jingle. On March 24, two additional songs on two different albums were released: "Kids of the Future", from the Meet the Robinsons soundtrack (spoof of Kim Wilde's "Kids in America"), and "I Wanna Be Like You", from Disneymania 5. The Jonas Brothers made their first appearance at the White House on Monday, April 9, 2007, during the annual White House Easter Egg Roll, where they sang the National Anthem. They returned on Wednesday June 27, 2007, during a Celebrating Women in Sports Tee Ball game on the South Lawn. They sang the National Anthem again, and, after the game, the Jonas Brothers entertained at the picnic-reception with a selection of their hits. Their self-titled second album was released on August 7, 2007. It reached number five on the Billboard Hot 200 chart in its first week. Two singles with music videos were also released around this time – "Hold On" two weeks before, and "S.O.S.", four days before the release of the album. In August 2007, the Jonas Brothers made several appearances on television. On August 17, they guest-starred in an episode of the Disney Channel show Hannah Montana titled "Me and Mr. Jonas and Mr. Jonas and Mr. Jonas".

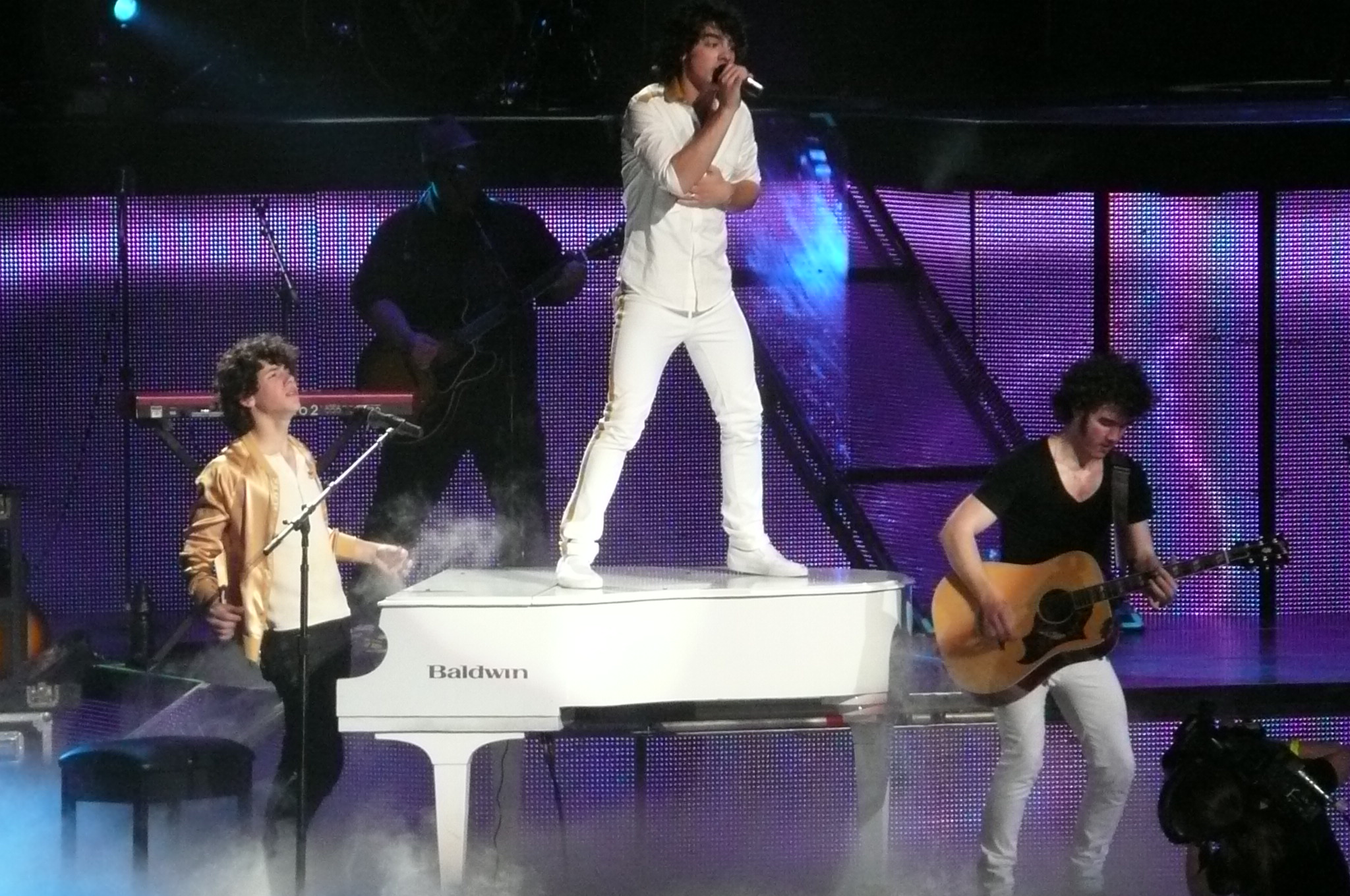
Jonas Brothers performing "When You Look Me in the Eyes"

They also performed "We Got the Party" with Miley Cyrus in the episode, which premiered after High School Musical 2 and was viewed by 10.7 million people that night. On August 24, the Jonas Brothers performed two songs at the Miss Teen USA contest. On August 26, the Jonas Brothers co-presented an award with Miley Cyrus at the Teen Choice Awards. On November 18, 2007, they performed at the American Music Awards, performing the song "S.O.S." On November 22, the brothers appeared in the 81st annual Macy's Thanksgiving Day Parade. For their final performance of 2007, the three brothers performed their singles "Hold On" and "S.O.S." at Dick Clark's New Year's Rockin' Eve. The Jonas Brothers kicked off their When You Look Me in the Eyes Tour on January 31, 2008, in Tucson, Arizona. They performed several new songs on the tour that were slated to be on their third studio album, A Little Bit Longer. The Jonas Brothers made their acting debut in Season 2 of the Disney Channel series Hannah Montana, where they guest starred and performed "We Got The Party With Us" on the episode "Me and Mr. Jonas and Mr. Jonas and Mr. Jonas". In 2008, they collaborated with Miley Cyrus on her 3D concert film Hannah Montana & Miley Cyrus: Best of Both Worlds Concert, filmed during Cyrus' Best of Both Worlds Tour, where they sang "We Got The Party With Us" with Cyrus as Hannah Montana. While on the When You Look Me in the Eyes Tour, the Jonas Brothers filmed a Disney Channel reality short series entitled, Jonas Brothers: Living the Dream, that premiered on Disney Channel.

=== 2008–2009: A Little Bit Longer and acting ===
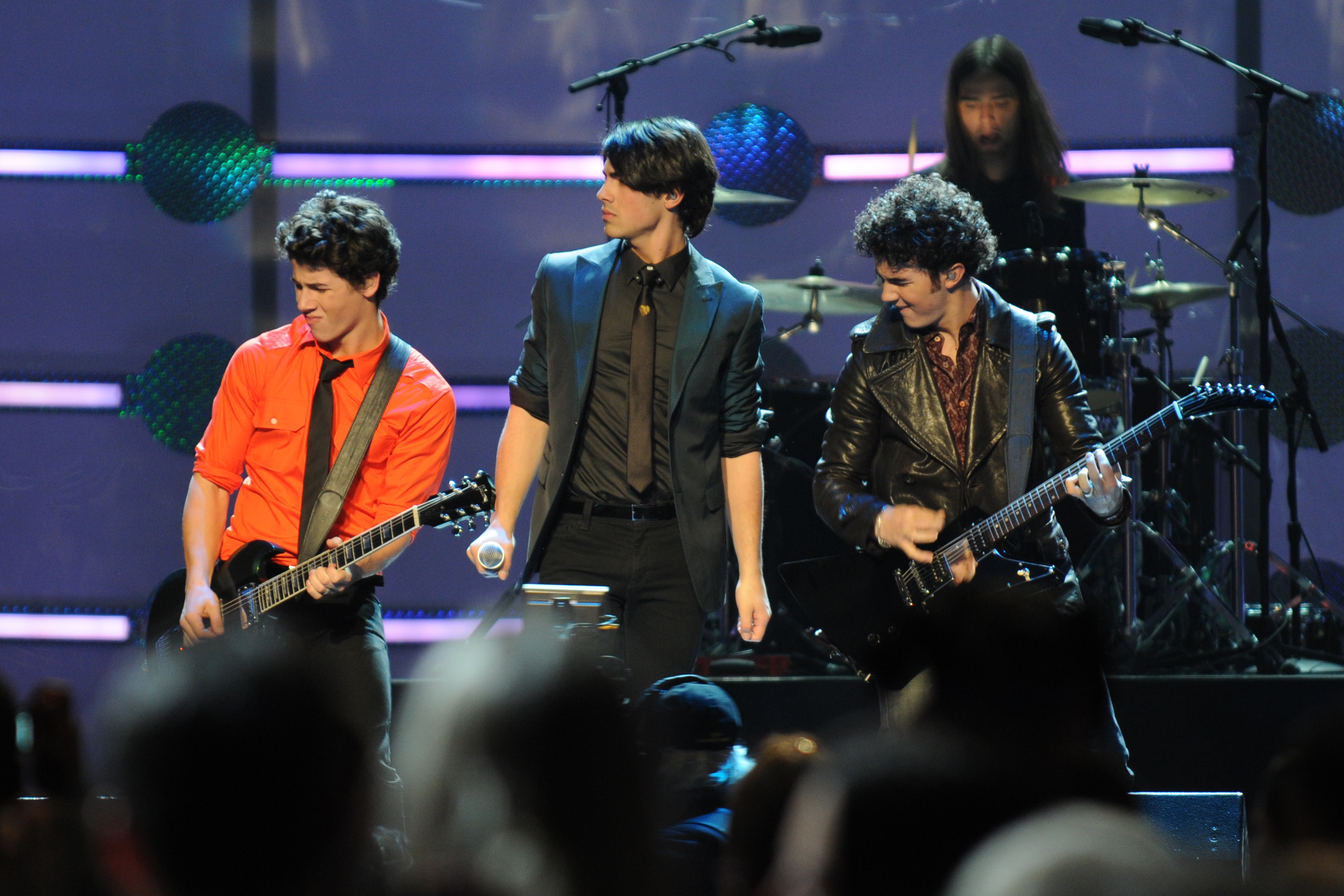
Jonas Brothers performing in the Kids' Inaugural: "We Are the Future" concert in 2009

The Jonas Brothers' third studio album, A Little Bit Longer, was released in the United States on August 12, 2008. On June 24, 2008, iTunes announced that it would release four songs from A Little Bit Longer, one roughly every two weeks. The purchase of each of the songs applies to the cost of the entire album, which could be purchased via iTunes' Complete the Album feature after release. Each song released also featured a podcast. Each song occupied the number one spot on iTunes for at least three days. After the Look Me in the Eyes Tour ended on March 22, 2008, the Jonas Brothers announced that they would be opening up for Avril Lavigne's The Best Damn Tour along with Boys Like Girls, for the second leg of the tour in Europe, which lasted from late May to late June 2008. While filming Camp Rock, the Jonas Brothers co-wrote and co-produced six songs for fellow Disney Channel star Demi Lovato, for Lovato's album Don't Forget. The album, co-produced by the Jonas Brothers, was released on September 23, 2008. A soundtrack was released for Camp Rock on June 17, 2008, debuting at No. 3 on the Billboard 200 with 188,000 copies sold in its first week. The Jonas Brothers also did a half-hour variety special on Disney Channel entitled, Studio DC: Almost Live, that featured The Muppets and other Disney Channel stars. During this time, the Jonas Brothers also appeared on the Olympics-based special miniseries the Disney Channel Games, for the third annual show.

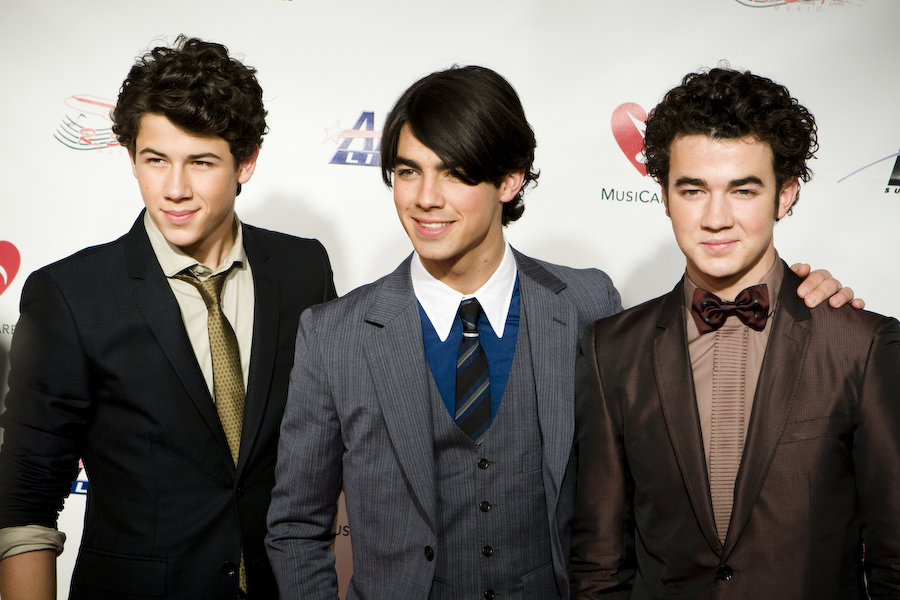
Jonas Brothers at the Grammy Auction in February 2009

During the summer of 2008, the Jonas Brothers started the Burnin' Up Tour in North America, promoting A Little Bit Longer. The tour began on July 4, 2008, at Molson Amphitheatre in Toronto, Ontario. The band made their film debut in the Disney Channel Original Movie Camp Rock, in which they played a band called Connect Three. Joe Jonas plays the lead male role and lead singer Shane Gray, Nick Jonas plays the role of Nate, a guitarist, and Kevin Jonas plays the role of Jason, another guitarist. The film premiered on June 20, 2008, in the United States on Disney Channel, and Canada on Family, receiving mixed reviews. On the Disney Channel, the film was followed by the premiere of the music video for "Burnin' Up", which featured cameos from Selena Gomez, Robert Davi, Danny Trejo and David Carradine. Directed by Brendan Malloy, the video earned nominations for Video of the Year and Best Pop Video at the 2008 MTV Video Music Awards.

A Disney Digital 3-D production crew filmed the two shows of theirs Burnin' Up Tour in Anaheim on July 13 and 14, 2008, including a performance by Lovato with the Jonas Brothers on "This Is Me" and Taylor Swift with the brothers on "Should've Said No". Both shows and additional footage recorded while on tour were used for the theatrical release of their 3D concert biopic, Jonas Brothers: The 3D Concert Experience, on February 22, 2009.

On July 14, they announced on stage that the band had already written five songs for their fourth studio album. The band was featured in the July 2008 issue of Rolling Stone magazine and became the youngest band to be on the cover of the magazine. The Jonas Brothers visited downtown Cleveland, Ohio's Rock and Roll Hall of Fame before their sold-out concert on the evening of August 22, 2008, at Blossom Music Center. They presented the suits and pants they wore on the cover artwork of A Little Bit Longer to Jim Henke, vice president of the Rock and Roll Hall of Fame. The suits are part of the Right Here, Right Now! exhibit. In December 2008, the Jonas Brothers were nominated for the Best New Artist award at the 51st Grammy Awards. The Jonas Brothers appeared as musical guest on Saturday Night Live's 34th season on February 14, 2009, making their SNL debut. The band also announced on March 11, 2009, that they will be embarking on a world tour in mid-2009. They were joined by the popular Korean girl band Wonder Girls, who debuted in America, as their opening act. In April 2009, the Jonas Brothers finished filming the first season of their Disney Channel Original Series, Jonas and was premiered on May 2, 2009. The Jonas Brothers also voiced three stone cherubs in the film Night at the Museum: Battle of the Smithsonian, which was released on May 22, 2009.

=== 2009–2010: Jonas and Lines, Vines and Trying Times ===
The brothers finished recording their fourth studio album, Lines, Vines and Trying Times, and began to talk about the album in the beginning of 2009. They said on several occasions that they had been working on writing and recording songs since their Burnin' Up tour in mid-2008. On March 11, 2009, the Jonas Brothers announced that their fourth studio album, Lines, Vines and Trying Times, would be released on June 15, 2009. They said about the title in the interview with Rolling Stone that, "Lines are something that someone feeds you, vines are the things that get in the way, and trying times, well, that's obvious." They also told Billboard, "We're trying to learn as much as we can, continuing to grow." Kevin added that, "The overall message is it's the same old Jonas Brothers, in a sense, but we're adding more and more music, including different musical instruments that are going to add and build to the sound we already have." Nick also said the songs on the album are "our journal in songs, about all things we've gone through, personal experiences we get inspiration from. We've also been working on trying to use metaphors.. to kind of mask a literal thing that happens to us.". Before the release of Lines, Vines and Trying Times, they released two singles, "Paranoid" (a month before) and "Fly with Me" (seven days before). Lines, Vines and Trying Times debuted at number one, thus becoming their second No. 1 album.

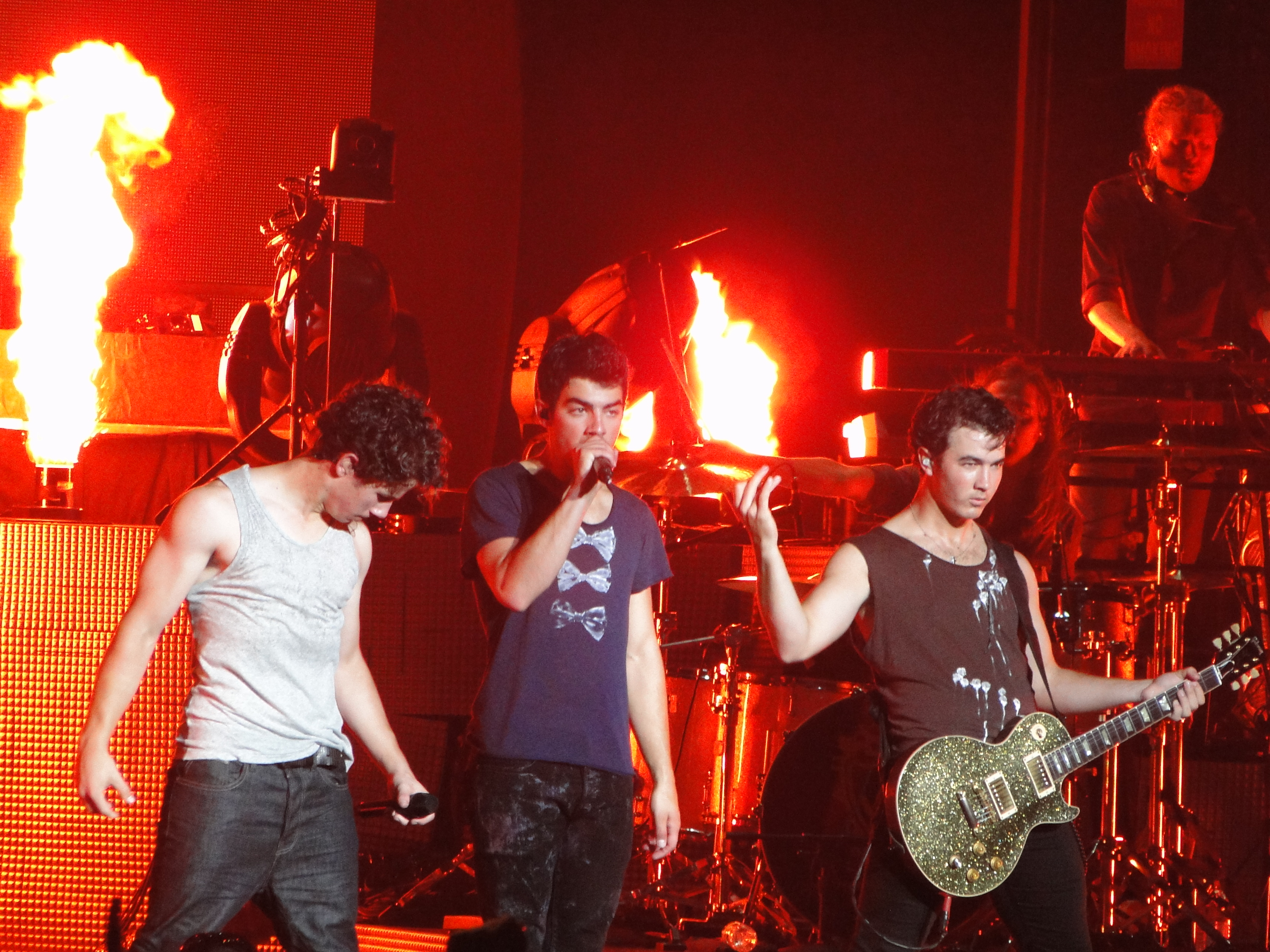
Jonas Brothers performing "Burnin' Up" in 2010.

On July 7, 2009, the Jonas Brothers announced that they had signed Honor Society to the record label they started with Hollywood Records. A month later, "Send It On" was released on Radio Disney. The radio single was performed with Selena Gomez, Miley Cyrus, and Demi Lovato for Disney's Friends for Change. On August 9, 2009, the Jonas Brothers hosted and performed on the 2009 Teen Choice Awards. Hollywood Records announced via YouTube Demi Lovato and Jonas Brothers' Walmart CD+DVD Soundcheck. Joe was a guest judge on American Idol during the Dallas auditions, which aired January 27, 2010. After the success of Camp Rock, a sequel was in immediate development. Production on the film began on September 3, 2009, and wrapped on October 16, 2009. The film, entitled Camp Rock 2: The Final Jam, was aired on Disney Channel on September 3, 2010. The movie was filmed in Ontario, Canada. In late 2010, the Brothers took part in a concert at the White House honoring Paul McCartney's reception of a Gershwin Prize for Popular Music by U.S. President Barack Obama. As a personal request from McCartney, they covered "Drive My Car" from the Beatles' Rubber Soul.

=== 2011–2013: Hiatus, LiVe and split ===
In 2011, the brothers took a hiatus to focus on their solo careers – Joe released his debut album Fastlife, Nick embarked on 2011 Tour with his band Nick Jonas & the Administration and Kevin studied music production. In addition, they parted ways with Hollywood Records, who had been their label since February 2007. In December 2011, a new song leaked on the internet, "Dance Until Tomorrow", but they never released it. Despite rumors that they had split, Kevin said the band would release new material in the future: "I think the tides are perfectly lining up for the future of the Jonas Brothers again". In August 2012, Kevin starred in the E! reality series Married to Jonas alongside his wife Danielle and brothers Nick and Joe, documenting the young couple's domestic life.

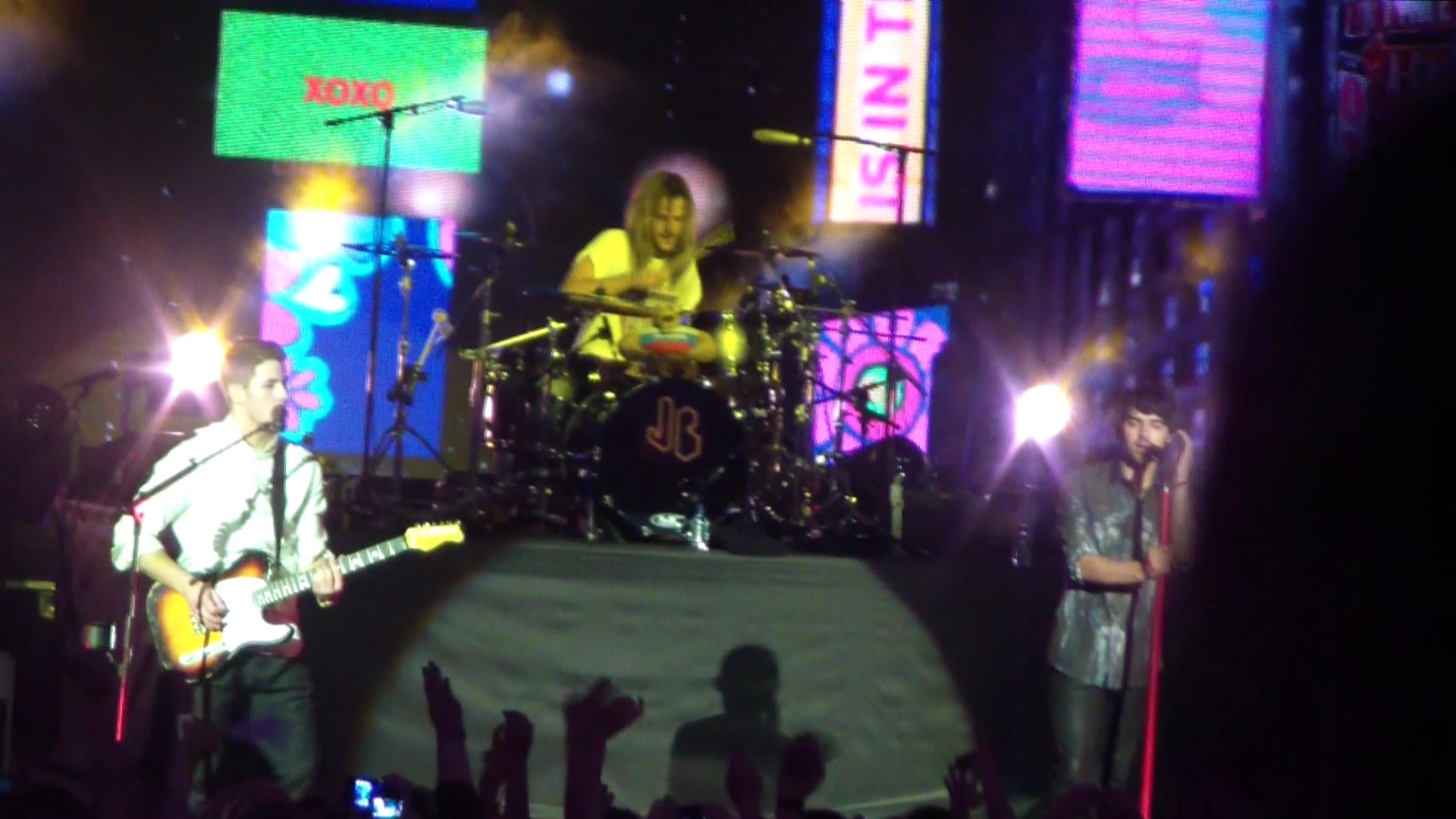
Nick and Joe Jonas performing in Moscow, November 2012

On August 17, 2012, after two years of their last work together, they announced a new concert tour, the World Tour 2012/2013. On October 3, 2012, a preview of the song "Meet You in Paris" was released on Cambio. The new tour started on October 11, 2012, at Radio City Music Hall in New York City, where they performed several songs from their previous albums along with a new song entitled "Let's Go". During the reunion concert, they also performed other new songs: "Wedding Bells", "First Time" and "Neon". They performed at Jingle Ball at L.A. Live on December 1, 2012, and announced several tour dates to take place in South America. They performed at the Viña del Mar International Song Festival on February 28, 2013, in Chile. Their fifth studio album, which would have been their first not to be released through Hollywood Records since 2006 and their first record since 2009's Lines, Vines and Trying Times, was scheduled to be released in 2013. The album would be titled V (pronounced: Five), the Roman numeral for five. The lead single, "Pom Poms", was released on April 2, 2013. The music video for the song was filmed in February 2013 in New Orleans, Louisiana, and premiered on E! on April 2, 2013. "First Time", the second single from their fifth album, was released on June 25, 2013. In June they embarked the Jonas Brothers Live 2013 tour to promote the new songs.

On October 9, 2013, the group cancelled 23 tour dates between October and December, citing a "deep rift within the band" over "creative differences". On October 29, 2013, the Jonas Brothers officially confirmed their split. During an interview, Nick Jonas stated that the album wouldn't be released but decided to release songs in a live album: "We want to do something special for our fans because they've been so supportive of us for so many years. What we've decided to do is package an album with 10 live tracks from the summer tour and four of the songs that would have been on 'V', and if you count 'Pom Poms' and 'First Time', it's actually 6 songs that would have been on 'V'. We’ll be sending that out soon for the fans." The album was released with the title Live, noting the letter "V" in caps as a reference to their would-be fifth studio album of the same name.

=== 2019–2022: Reunion and Happiness Begins ===
On February 28, 2019, the Jonas Brothers announced their comeback via social media. On March 1, they released a new single, "Sucker", under Republic Records. They appeared on The Late Late Show with James Corden each night from March 4 to 7 to promote the track. The song debuted at number one on the Billboard Hot 100 and the US Hot Digital Songs chart, with 88,000 copies sold in its first week, becoming the Jonas Brothers' first number-one song and the first number one by a boy band on the chart since 2003's "Bump, Bump, Bump" by B2K. It became the band's first entry on the chart since 2013's "Pom Poms" and their first top 10 since 2008's "Tonight". The Jonas Brothers also became the second group in history to have a song debut at number one after Aerosmith's "I Don't Want to Miss a Thing" and the first group in this century to achieve this. In its April 13, 2019, issue, "Sucker" became the Jonas' first top 10 on Dance/Mix Show Airplay, surging 20–6 in its third week of charting. On April 5, the group released the single "Cool". On April 22, the band announced their upcoming album Happiness Begins, which was released on June 7, 2019, and preceded by a documentary titled Chasing Happiness, which premiered on June 4 on Amazon Prime Video. The album debuted at number one on the Billboard 200 chart, marked the biggest debut of 2019 and maintained the record until Taylor Swift's seventh studio album, Lover, was released on August 23 of the same year. The group embarked on their tenth headlining tour, the "Happiness Begins Tour", performing 92 shows around the globe.

On June 8, the band performed at Capital's Summertime Ball 2019 in the United Kingdom; the setlist included performing "Year 3000" with the original band behind the song, Busted. On June 18, the band released the promotional single "Greenlight" from their episode of Songland, written by Able Heart. On June 21, they were featured on Latino singers Sebastián Yatra, Daddy Yankee, and Natti Natasha's single called "Runaway". On July 2, the band released "Only Human", the third single off Happiness Begins, followed by the music video on August 13. On September 27, Diplo released a single titled "Lonely", which featured the Jonas Brothers. On November 8, the group released a Christmas song titled "Like It's Christmas". The subsequent year, the band made a cameo appearance on the series Dash & Lily and performed the single.

On January 17, 2020, the band released the single "What a Man Gotta Do". On January 24, they announced a residency show in Las Vegas named Jonas Brothers in Vegas at the Park Theater at Park MGM beginning on April 1, with eight other dates during the month keeping them in place until the 18th. The residency was ultimately cancelled due to the COVID-19 pandemic. The band performed at the 62nd Annual Grammy Awards on January 26, revealing a new song titled "Five More Minutes". On May 15, they released a two-track bundle titled XV, which contains the singles "X" and "Five More Minutes", the former of which features Colombian singer Karol G. On May 16, they made an appearance on Graduate Together: America Honors the High School Class of 2020 to perform their new song. On October 30, they released another Christmas song titled "I Need You Christmas". On March 15, 2021, a deluxe version of Nick Jonas' fourth studio album, Spaceman, was released. The record included the song "Selfish", which featured the Jonas Brothers.

On May 19, 2021, the Jonas Brothers announced that they would be embarking on their eleventh headlining tour, Remember This Tour, consisting of 44 shows at outdoor venues around the United States, with the tour beginning on August 20, 2021, in Las Vegas. During their Remember This Tour tour, the Jonas Brothers required all fans attending their shows to present a proof of vaccination against COVID-19 or a negative COVID-19 test. The brothers released a statement on social media saying "We believe this is the best thing we can do for our fans, our hard working crew, and the communities we're visiting." Kelsea Ballerini was announced as a special guest for a majority of shows. On May 21, DJ Marshmello released "Leave Before You Love Me", a single featuring the Jonas Brothers. Two days later, they performed the single at the 2021 Billboard Music Awards, with Nick Jonas also serving as the host for the ceremony. The single "Remember This" premiered on June 18 and was used in NBC's coverage of the 2020 Summer Olympics. They recorded the song "Mercy" for the soundtrack of Space Jam: A New Legacy which was released on July 9.

On September 5, 2021, during the band's Remember This Tour, the Jonas Brothers premiered a song titled "Who's in Your Head" while performing at the Red Rocks Parks and Amphitheater in Colorado. The single was released on September 17. On March 1, 2022, they announced a 5-dates residency show in Las Vegas named Jonas Brothers: Live in Vegas, taking place from June 3 to 11. It was followed by a second 3-dates residency, which took place in November of the same year.

=== 2023–present: The Album, 20th Anniversary and Greetings from Your Hometown ===
In January 2023, while appearing on The Kelly Clarkson Show, Nick Jonas announced that the band's new album was completed. On January 30, 2023, the Jonas Brothers received a star on the Hollywood Walk of Fame and announced that their sixth studio album, titled The Album, would be released on May 5, 2023, later delayed to and released on May 12. The Album debuted at number three on Billboard 200 chart, marking the Jonas Brothers' seventh top ten album on the chart. The record was preceded by its lead single, "Wings", which was released on February 24 of the same year. "Waffle House" was released as the second single on April 7, 2023. The third single, "Summer Baby", was sent to adult contemporary radio on June 5, 2023. In support of The Album, the band embarked the tour "Five Albums. One Night. The World Tour".

The single "Do It Like That", a collaboration with South Korean boy band Tomorrow X Together from the album The Name Chapter: Freefall, was released on July 7, 2023. On July 27, 2023, Busted released "Year 3000 2.0", which features the Jonas Brothers in a collaboration celebrating the 20th anniversary of Busted. The song is included in the compilation album Greatest Hits 2.0. The single "Strong Enough", a collaboration with Bailey Zimmerman, was released on November 10, 2023. The band performed at the halftime show at the 111th Grey Cup on November 17, 2024, in Vancouver, British Columbia, Canada. On January 17, 2025, the Jonas Brothers released the single "Slow Motion" as their second collaboration with Marshmello. On January 31, the band released a collaboration with country music trio Rascal Flatts entitled "I Dare You".

In January 2025, it was announced the band would be producing and starring as fictionalized versions of themselves in a Christmas comedy film for Disney+ as they "face a series of escalating obstacles as they struggle to make it from London to New York in time to spend Christmas with their families." The film, A Very Jonas Christmas Movie, was released on Disney+ on November 14, 2025. The original soundtrack was released on the same day and features 10 songs, including "Coming Home This Christmas" (featuring Kenny G), and the band's 2019 song "Like It's Christmas".

JonasCon, a fan convention celebrating the 20th anniversary of the band, took place on March 23, 2025, in East Rutherford, New Jersey. During the event, the Jonas Brothers announced that their seventh studio album, Greetings from Your Hometown, would be released on August 8, 2025. The lead single, "Love Me to Heaven", was released on March 21, 2025. The second single, "No Time to Talk", was released on June 20, 2025. "I Can't Lose" was released as the album's third single on July 15, 2025. The album debuted at number six on the Billboard 200, becoming the Jonas Brothers' eighth top ten album on the chart.

In support of the record, the band begun embarking on the Jonas20: Greetings from Your Hometown Tour on August 10, 2025. During the first concert, they were joined by their Camp Rock co-star Lovato, with whom they performed "This Is Me" and "Wouldn't Change a Thing". A month later, Camp Rock 3 was announced by Disney with the brothers and Lovato reprising their roles and additionally serving as executive producers. The film premiered on Disney Channel on August 13, 2026. A live album recorded during the tour, titled Friends from Your Hometown, was released on March 13, 2026.

On November 25, 2025, MGK released a remix of his single "Cliché" featuring the Jonas Brothers. On December 3, they were honored with a hand and footprint ceremony at the TCL Chinese Theatre in Hollywood. On August 16, 2026, they were inducted in the Disney Legends Hall of Fame.

On August 17, 2026, the band announced The Burning Up Tour All Over Again. The tour commenced on August 20, 2026, at Madison Square Garden, in New York City, and is set to conclude on December 22, 2026, in Newark, New Jersey. During the August 20 concert, they performed a new song, titled "Listen When Sad", which was released as a single on August 28.

== Philanthropy ==
"We started The Change for the Children Foundation to support programs that motivate and inspire children to face adversity with confidence, determination and a will to succeed. And we think the best people to help children are their peers – kids helping other kids who are a little less fortunate".

— Jonas about the success process.

The Jonas Brothers earned an estimated $12 million in 2007, and have donated 10% of their earnings to their charity, Change for the Children Foundation. Change for the Children Foundation, started by the Jonas Brothers, has contributors donate to charities such as Nothing But Nets, American Diabetes Foundation, St. Jude Children's Research Hospital, Children's Hospital Los Angeles, and Summer Stars Camp for the Performing Arts. Since August 6, 2008, Bayer Diabetes Care has partnered with Nick Jonas as a diabetes ambassador to promote the idea that young people should manage their diabetes, as Nick was diagnosed with Type 1 diabetes when he was 13. Jonas testified in the U.S. Senate to promote more research funding for the disease.

The Jonas Brothers have been strong supporters of Do Something. In 2007, the brothers filmed a public service announcement raising awareness about teenage homelessness and encouraging teens to begin "jeans drives" in their communities to donate to the homeless. In 2010, Nick further volunteered his efforts for Do Something by offering his time as a prize to teens who donated jeans to Do Something and Aeropostale's "Teens for Jeans" campaign. Further, Nick filmed another public service announcement, this one in support of Do Something's "Battle of the Bands" campaign for the advancement of music education in schools.

The Jonas Brothers have made several appearances at We Day, an event that encourages young people to do local and global acts of charity. In a post on Twitter, the band also announced that a portion of every ticket purchased for their Toronto show would be donated to WE to help provide secondary school scholarships to young girls in Kenya.

In August 2021, the Jonas Brothers partnered with NGO Feeding America to promote donations to the organization by holding a competition to have dinner with a selected fan at a Los Angeles restaurant. The Jonas Brothers have continued to advocate to fight hunger worldwide by partnering, in early 2022, with Global Citizen, which fights extreme poverty, among other issues.

== Musical style ==
The Jonas Brothers' musical style has generally been described as rock, pop rock, pop punk, and power pop.

== Members ==
Current

- Nick Jonas – lead vocals, rhythm guitar, keyboards, drums, bass guitar (2005–2013, 2019–present)
- Joe Jonas – lead vocals, rhythm guitar, tambourine, keyboards (2005–2013, 2019–present)
- Kevin Jonas – lead guitar, backing and occasional lead vocals, piano (2005–2013, 2019–present)

Current touring musicians

- Jack Lawless – drums, percussion (2006–2013, 2019–present)
- Chase Foster – musical director (2019–present), violin (2023–present)
- Michael Wooten – keyboards (2019–present)
- KellyeAnn Keough – backing vocals (2019–present)
- Mark Joseph – backing vocals (2019–present)
- Tyler Carroll – bass guitar (2020–present)
- JinJoo Lee – lead and rhythm guitars (2022–present)
- Molly Lopresti – percussion (2023–present)
- Christine Noel – backing vocals (2023–present)
- Olivia Walker – backing vocals (2023–present)
- Michael Sarian – trumpet (2023–present)
- Jeffrey Miller – trombone (2023–present)
- Fabian Chavez – tenor saxophone (2023–present)
- Gabi Rose – alto saxophone (2023–present)
- Danica Pinner – cello (2023–present)
- Daniel Byrne – lead and rhythm guitars (2024–present)

Former touring musicians

- Alexander Noyes – drums (2005–2006)
- John Lloyd Taylor – lead and rhythm guitars, backing vocals, musical director (2005–2013)
- Greg Garbowsky – bass guitar, percussion, backing vocals (2005–2013)
- Ryan Liestman – keyboards, guitar, backing vocals, banjo (2008–2013)
- Demian Arriaga – percussion (2010, 2019–2021)
- Paris Carney-Garbowsky – backing vocals, percussion, guitar (2010–2013)
- Megan Mullins – violin, backing vocals (2010–2013)
- Marcus Kincy – keyboards (2012–2013)
- Matt Hines – bass guitar (2019)
- Tarron Clayton – bass guitar (2019)
- Tom "Liminal" Crouch – lead and rhythm guitars (2019–2024)

== Discography ==
- It's About Time (2006)
- Jonas Brothers (2007)
- A Little Bit Longer (2008)
- Lines, Vines and Trying Times (2009)
- Happiness Begins (2019)
- The Album (2023)
- Greetings from Your Hometown (2025)

== Filmography ==
=== Film ===
Year	Title	Role	Notes
2008	Hannah Montana and Miley Cyrus: Best of Both Worlds Concert	Themselves	
2009	Jonas Brothers: The 3D Concert Experience	Themselves	
2009	Night at the Museum: Battle of the Smithsonian	Cherubs	Voice and facial likeness
2019	Chasing Happiness	Themselves	Documentary
2020	Happiness Continues: A Jonas Brothers Concert Film	Themselves	Documentary, Concert film
2025	A Very Jonas Christmas Movie	Themselves	Disney+ Comedy

=== Television ===
Year	Title	Role	Notes	Ref.
2007	Hannah Montana	Themselves	Episode: "Me and Mr. Jonas and Mr. Jonas and Mr. Jonas"	
2008–10	Jonas Brothers: Living the Dream	Themselves		
2008	Camp Rock	Shane Gray, Nate and Jason	Television film	
2008	Disney Channel Games	Themselves / Contestants	5 episodes; brothers part of a team were: Nick (red), Joe (green) and Kevin (yellow)	
2008	Jonas Brothers: Live in London	Themselves	Documentary	
2008	Jonas Brothers: Band in a Bus	Themselves	Documentary	
2008	Jonas Brothers: Live & Mobile	Themselves	Documentary	
2009	Extreme Makeover: Home Edition	Themselves	Episode: "The Akers Family"	
2009	Atrévete a soñar	Themselves	Soap opera	
2009	MuchMusic Video Awards	Co-hosts		
2009	Teen Choice Awards	Co-hosts		
2009–10	Jonas	Joe, Nick and Kevin Lucas	Lead roles	
2010	Camp Rock 2: The Final Jam	Shane Gray, Nate and Jason	Television film	
2011	Jonas Brothers: The Journey	Themselves	Documentary	
2012–13	Married to Jonas	Themselves		
2019	Songland	Themselves	Episode: "Jonas Brothers"	
2019	Brad Paisley Thinks He's Special	Themselves	Brad Paisley with Kelsea Ballerini, Darius Rucker, Peyton Manning, Kimberly Williams-Paisley, Tim McGraw, Carrie Underwood	
2020	The Voice	Themselves	Nick (coach; season 18, 20), Joe and Kevin (advisors for Team Nick in season 18)	
2020	Dash & Lily	Themselves	Episode: "New Year's Eve"	
2021	Olympic Dreams Featuring Jonas Brothers	Themselves	NBC special	
2021	Jonas Brothers Family Roast	Themselves	Netflix comedy special	
2026	Camp Rock 3	Shane Gray, Nate and Jason	Television film	

=== Web ===
Year	Title	Role	Notes	Ref.
2009	KSM: Read Between the Lines	Themselves	Episode: "Hangin' with the Jonas Brothers"	

== Bibliography ==
- Burning Up: On Tour with the Jonas Brothers (2008) ISBN 9781423120292
- Blood: A Memoir by the Jonas Brothers (2020) ISBN 9780063091870

== Concert tours ==
Headlining

- American Club Tour (2006)
- Marvelous Party Tour (2007)
- When You Look Me in the Eyes Tour (2008)
- The Burning Up Tour (2008–2009)
- Jonas Brothers World Tour 2009 (2009)
- Jonas Brothers: Live in Concert (2010)
- Jonas Brothers World Tour 2012/2013 (2012–2013)
- Jonas Brothers Live 2013 (2013)
- Happiness Begins Tour (2019–2020)
- Remember This Tour (2021–2022)
- Five Albums. One Night. The World Tour (2023–2024)
- Jonas20: Greetings from Your Hometown Tour (2025–2026)
- The Burning Up Tour All Over Again (2026)

Residency shows

- Jonas Brothers: Live in Vegas (2022)
- Jonas Brothers on Broadway (2023)

Promotional

- Fall 2005 Promo Tour (2005)
- X Marks the Unlock Digital Tour (2020)
- Steal an Egg (Roblox) (2026)

Opening act

- Cheetah-licious Christmas Tour (The Cheetah Girls) (2005)
- Never Gone Tour (Backstreet Boys) (2006)
- 2006 US Tour (The Veronicas) (2006)
- Right Where You Want Me Tour (Jesse McCartney) (2007)
- Best of Both Worlds Tour (Miley Cyrus) (2007–2008)
- The Best Damn World Tour (Avril Lavigne) (2008)
