= Slow Motion (Marshmello and Jonas Brothers song) =

2025 single by Marshmello and Jonas Brothers

Single by Marshmello and Jonas Brothers

from the album Greetings from Your Hometown
- Released: January 17, 2025
- Length: 2:30
- Label: Republic; Joytime Collective
- Songwriters: Christopher Comstock; Nicholas Gale; Connor McDonough; Riley McDonough; Thomas Eriksen; Jake Torrey; Mat Davis
- Producer: Marshmello

Marshmello singles chronology
"Rave Repeater" (2024)	"Slow Motion" (2025)	"Fale Então" (2025)

Jonas Brothers singles chronology
"Holiday" (2024)	"Slow Motion" (2025)	"I Dare You" (2025)

Lyric video
- "Slow Motion" on YouTube

"Slow Motion" is a song by American record producer Marshmello and American pop rock band Jonas Brothers. It was released through Republic Records and Joytime Collective as a single on January 17, 2025. "Slow Motion" serves as the second collaboration between Marshmello and the Jonas Brothers, following their 2021 single, "Leave Before You Love Me". The song appears as the closing track on the band's seventh studio album, Greetings from Your Hometown.

== Background and promotion ==
On December 31, 2024, the Jonas Brothers were briefly interviewed by Ryan Seacrest in New York City's Times Square right before their New Year's Eve performance at Dick Clark's New Year's Rockin' Eve, in which Nick Jonas from the group announced the collaboration and its release date. Marshmello shared a short snippet of the song through a video on TikTok on January 7, 2025.

== Composition ==
Programming was solely handled by Marshmello, mixing was handled by Manny Marroquin, and mastering was handled by Zach Pereyra. Of the Jonas Brothers' members individual contributions to the song, brothers Nick and Joe share vocals and brother Kevin plays guitar and background vocals.

The song is composed in a key of C-sharp major in common time and features a tempo of 104 beats per minute.

== Charts ==
=== Weekly charts ===
Weekly chart performance for "Slow Motion"
Chart (2025)	Peak position
Belarus Airplay (TopHit)	3
Belgium (Ultratop 50 Flanders)	22
CIS Airplay (TopHit)	14
Japan Hot Overseas (Billboard Japan)	8
Kazakhstan Airplay (TopHit)	6
Latvia Airplay (TopHit)	1
Lithuania Airplay (TopHit)	35
Malta Airplay (Radiomonitor)	8
Moldova Airplay (TopHit)	64
Netherlands (Dutch Top 40)	36
New Zealand Hot Singles (RMNZ)	10
Poland (Polish Airplay Top 100)	77
Russia Airplay (TopHit)	9
Serbia Airplay (Radiomonitor)	17
Slovakia Airplay (ČNS IFPI)	45
South Africa Airplay (TOSAC)	14
Suriname (Nationale Top 40)	22
Sweden Heatseeker (Sverigetopplistan)	9
Ukraine Airplay (TopHit)	104
US Adult Pop Airplay (Billboard)	22
US Pop Airplay (Billboard)	37
US Hot Dance/Electronic Songs (Billboard)	4

=== Monthly charts ===
Monthly chart performance for "Slow Motion"
Chart (2025)	Position
Belarus Airplay (TopHit)	6
CIS Airplay (TopHit)	16
Kazakhstan Airplay (TopHit)	8
Latvia Airplay (TopHit)	3
Lithuania Airplay (TopHit)	38
Moldova Airplay (TopHit)	72
Russia Airplay (TopHit)	13

=== Year-end charts ===
Year-end chart performance for "Slow Motion"
Chart (2025)	Position
Belarus Airplay (TopHit)	43
Belgium (Ultratop 50 Flanders)	114
CIS Airplay (TopHit)	69
Kazakhstan Airplay (TopHit)	54
Latvia Airplay (TopHit)	119
Lithuania Airplay (TopHit)	133
Russia Airplay (TopHit)	55
US Hot Dance/Electronic Songs (Billboard)	6

== Certifications ==
Certifications for "Slow Motion"
Region	Certification	Certified units/sales
Brazil (Pro-Música Brasil)	Gold	20,000^{‡}
^{‡} Sales+streaming figures based on certification alone.
