= Kopecky (band) =

US musical group

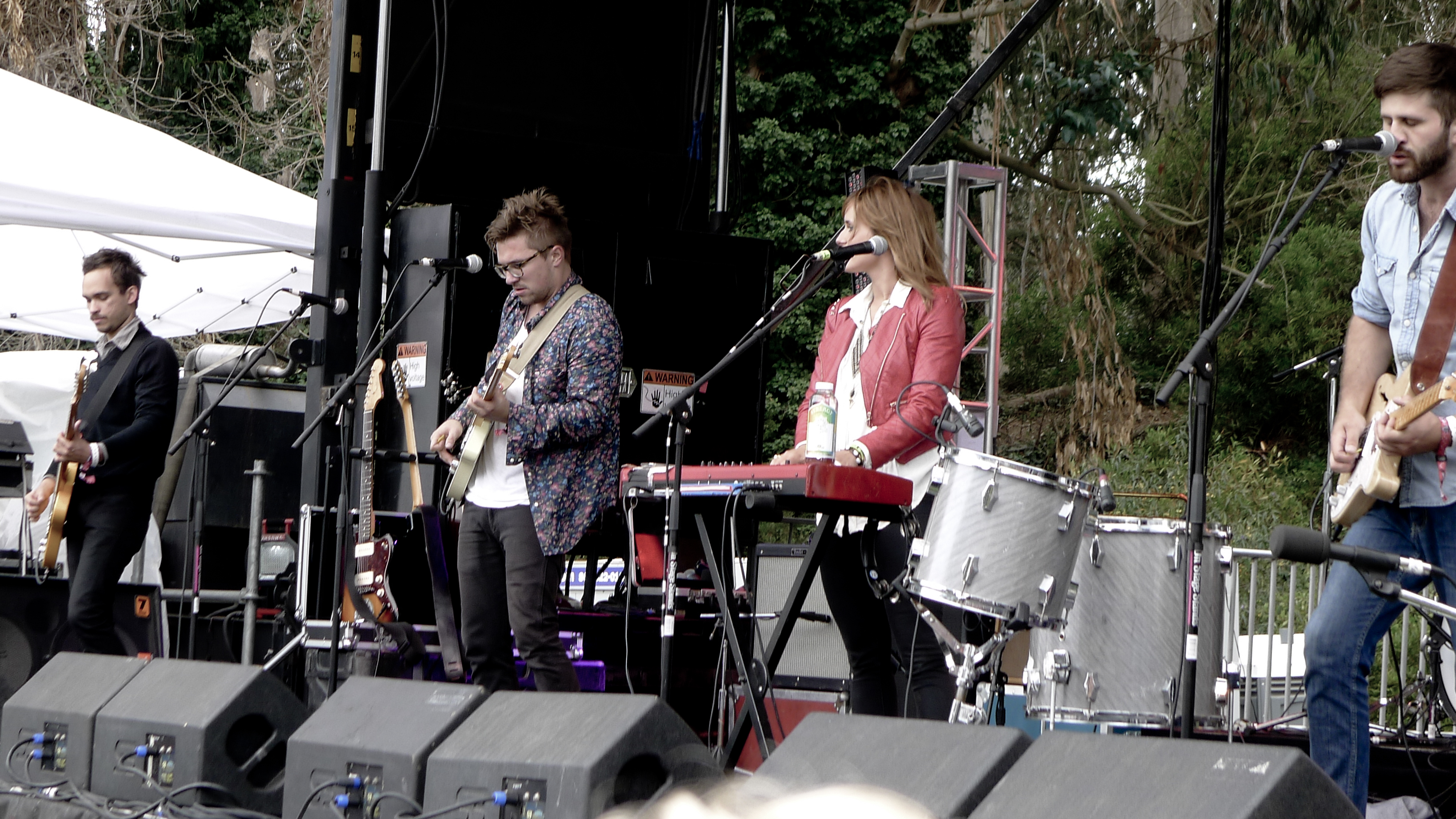
- Kopecky performing at the Outside Lands Music and Arts Festival in 2013

Background information
- Also known as: Kopecky Family Band (2007–2014)
- Origin: Nashville, Tennessee, US
- Genre: Indie rock
- Years active: 2007–present
- Label: ATO
- Spinoffs: Mr. Gabriel
- Members: Kelsey Kopecky; Gabe Simon; Steven Holmes; David Krohn; Markus Midkiff; Corey Oxendine
- Past members: Bennett Foster; Ben Kaufman

Kopecky (formerly the Kopecky Family Band) is an American indie-rock band formed in Nashville, Tennessee, in 2007. The band consists of Kelsey Kopecky (vocals, keyboards, and bass), Gabe Simon (vocals, guitar, and horns), Steven Holmes (guitar, lap steel guitar), David Krohn (drums), Markus Midkiff (cello, guitar, and keyboards), and Corey Oxendine (bass, guitar, and horns). Their debut album, Kids Raising Kids, was released in October 2012 and then rereleased by ATO Records in April 2013.

The group's second album, Drug for the Modern Age, was released on May 19, 2015, via ATO Records.

In July 2016, Kelsey Kopecky announced the band is on a break.

== History ==
The band originated when its founders, Kelsey Kopecky and Gabe Simon, met while attending the Belmont University in Nashville, Tennessee. They met lead guitarist Steven Holmes, bassist Corey Oxendine, cellist Markus Midkiff, and drummer David Krohn a couple of months later. Within a year they had released their first EP, Embraces (2007), followed by The Disaster and Of Epic Proportions in 2010. After 18 months of touring, the band released their debut album, Kids Raising Kids. The album was picked up and rereleased by ATO Records in April 2013 after the band signed with them in December 2012. The album features their Top 10 radio hit "Heartbeat" and has been cited in magazines such as The New York Times and Paste.

Since their formation, Kopecky has toured in the United States and Canada and has performed in music festivals such as Bonnaroo, Firefly Music Festival, Austin City Limits Music Festival, Lollapalooza, Outside Lands, Bumbershoot, South by Southwest, LouFest, and Paper City Music Festival. They have toured with artists such as Devotchka, Givers, Gomez, Michael Franti & Spearhead, Gogol Bordello, Milo Greene, the Lumineers, the Mowgli's and Lissie.

On December 17, 2014, the band announced on their Facebook page that they're "shortening things up a bit...keeping it simple". The photographed hand-written note further reads, "As we look forward to 2015, we await the release of our sophomore album with new music, we will be shortening our name to KOPECKY!"

A second album, titled Drug for the Modern Age, was released on May 19, 2015, via ATO Records.

== Media appearances ==
Kopecky made their first big press appearance on Paste magazine's Top 25 Best Live Acts of 2011 and The 25 Best New Bands of 2011. They were featured in the Booming section of the New York Times in 2013 and have had numerous appearances in American Songwriter. The band had an "On The Verge" feature in USA Today and their music video for "Change" premiered at Elle. "Heartbeat" hit number 5 on Triple A Radio Chart and "Are You Listening" broke into Top 25 at Triple A Radio Chart. The band's music video for "Hope" premiered at MTV Hive. Kopecky was also featured on an NPR Tiny Desk Concert.

Kopecky's music has also been featured on various television shows such as Grey's Anatomy on ABC, Royal Pains on USA, Parenthood on NBC, The Vampire Diaries on The CW, Awkward on MTV, and Beauty & The Beast on The CW.

Kopecky has been featured in the news on the Nashville Scene, Last.fm, and NPR Music due to their debut album, Kids Raising Kids.

The band made their major television debut on July 31, 2013, with an appearance on The Tonight Show with Jay Leno. They performed "Heartbeat".

== Discography ==
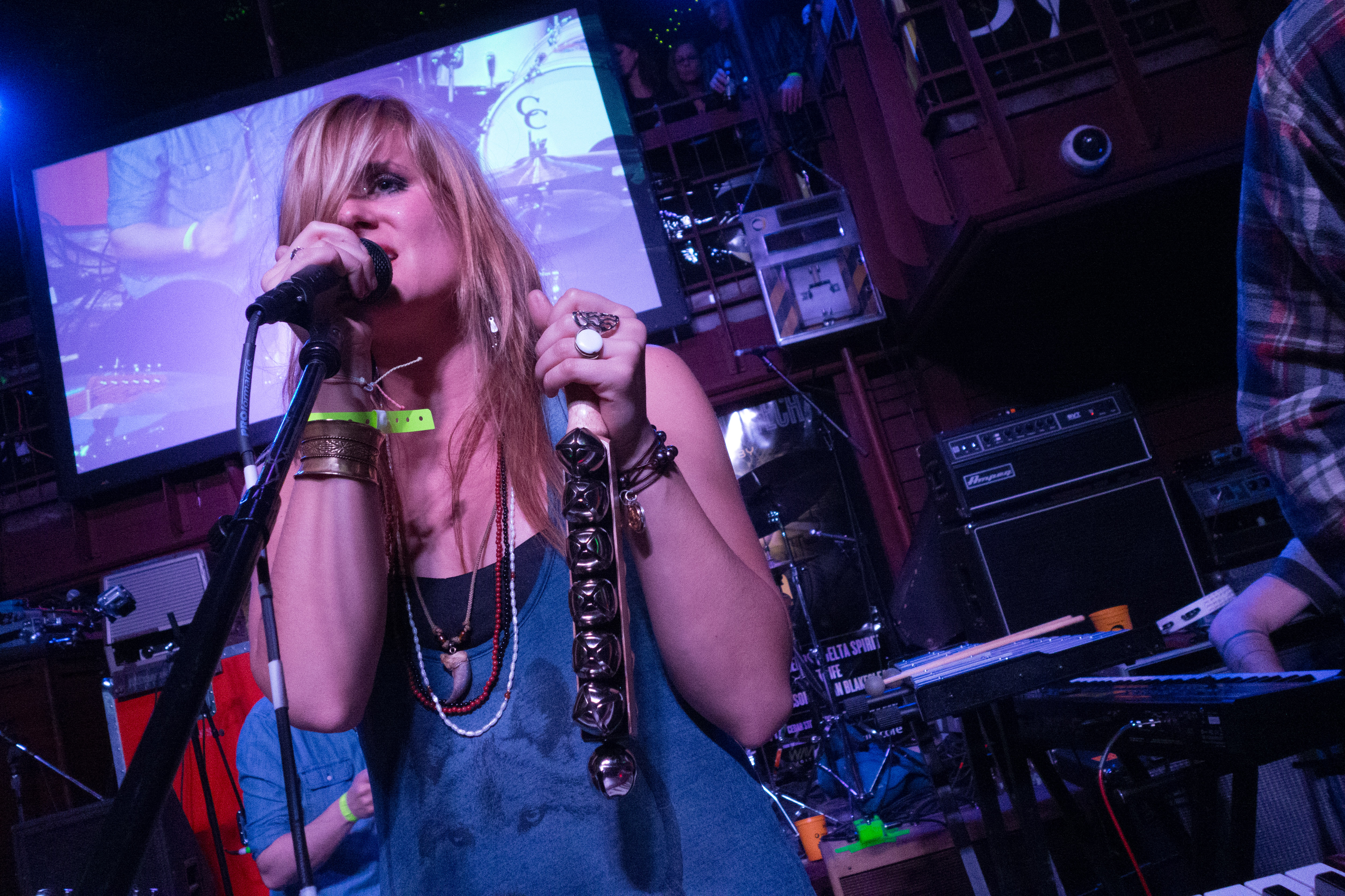
Kopecky Family Band performing in 2013

Album

| Title | Release date |
|---|---|
| Kids Raising Kids | October 23, 2012 |
| Drug for the Modern Age | May 19, 2015 |

Extended plays

| Title | Release date |
|---|---|
| Embraces | November 21, 2008 |
| The Disaster | August 3, 2010 |
| Of Epic Proportions | November 16, 2010 |
| We've Got It Covered | October 8, 2013 |

Singles

| Title | Year | Album |
|---|---|---|
| "Heartbeat" | 2012 | Kids Raising Kids |
| "Are You Listening?" | 2013 | Kids Raising Kids |
| "Quarterback" | 2015 | Drug for the Modern Age |

Music Videos

| Title | Year | Album |
|---|---|---|
| "Birds" | 2010 | The Disaster |
| "Heartbeat" | 2012 | Kids Raising Kids |
| "Hope" | 2013 | Kids Raising Kids |
| "Change" | 2013 | Kids Raising Kids |
