= Love Me to Heaven =

2025 single by Jonas Brothers

Single by Jonas Brothers

from the album Greetings from Your Hometown
- Released: March 21, 2025
- Genre: Pop; pop rock
- Length: 3:27
- Label: Republic
- Songwriters: Nicholas Jonas; Justin Tranter; Ferras Alqaisi; Ryland Blackinton; Sara Boe; Joshua Murty
- Producer: Murty

Jonas Brothers singles chronology
| "I Dare You" (2025) | "Love Me to Heaven" (2025) | "No Time to Talk" (2025) |

Music video
- "Love Me to Heaven" on YouTube

"Love Me to Heaven" is a song by American pop rock group Jonas Brothers. It was released through Republic Records as the lead single from their seventh studio album, Greetings from Your Hometown, on March 21, 2025. The song was written by Nick Jonas, Justin Tranter, Ferras Alqaisi, Ryland Blackinton, Sara Boe, and Joshua Murty, with the latter serving as the producer.

== Background and announcement ==
On March 13, 2025, the Jonas Brothers announced the release of the song, which serves as the lead single for their upcoming seventh studio album. The song was previewed on February 15, 2025, during the band's Massey Hall concert, which intended to kickstart their 20th anniversary celebrations.

== Release ==
The song was released on March 21, 2025, ahead of JonasCon, as part of the celebrations for the 20th anniversary of the Jonas Brothers.

On March 31, 2025, the band released the first of two music videos for the song. It features the band in a retro recording session.

== Composition ==
"Love Me to Heaven" was described as a funky uptempo song, that has potential to become an "addictive pop anthem". Billboard wrote that the song has an uptempo pop sound, with energetic beats in which the brothers "lean into romantic euphoria".

== Charts ==
=== Weekly charts ===
Weekly chart performance for "Love Me to Heaven"
| Chart (2025) | Peak position |
|---|---|
| Belgium (Ultratop 50 Flanders) | 31 |
| Belgium (Ultratop 50 Wallonia) | 49 |
| CIS Airplay (TopHit) | 33 |
| Costa Rica Anglo Airplay (Monitor Latino) | 5 |
| Croatia International Airplay (Top lista) | 46 |
| Czech Republic Airplay (ČNS IFPI) | 77 |
| Denmark Airplay (Tracklisten) | 10 |
| Japan Hot Overseas (Billboard Japan) | 7 |
| Kazakhstan Airplay (TopHit) | 7 |
| Lithuania Airplay (TopHit) | 33 |
| New Zealand Hot Singles (RMNZ) | 14 |
| Peru Anglo Airplay (Monitor Latino) | 2 |
| Russia Airplay (TopHit) | 24 |
| UK Singles Downloads (OCC) | 36 |
| UK Singles Sales (OCC) | 40 |
| US Adult Pop Airplay (Billboard) | 19 |
| US Pop Airplay (Billboard) | 34 |
| Venezuela Anglo Airplay (Monitor Latino) | 3 |

=== Monthly charts ===
Monthly chart performance for "Love Me to Heaven"
| Chart (2025) | Peak position |
|---|---|
| CIS Airplay (TopHit) | 33 |
| Kazakhstan Airplay (TopHit) | 8 |
| Lithuania Airplay (TopHit) | 37 |
| Russia Airplay (TopHit) | 25 |

=== Year-end charts ===
Year-end chart performance for "Love Me to Heaven"
| Chart (2025) | Position |
|---|---|
| Belgium (Ultratop 50 Flanders) | 77 |
| CIS Airplay (TopHit) | 88 |
| Kazakhstan Airplay (TopHit) | 40 |
| Lithuania Airplay (TopHit) | 187 |
| Russia Airplay (TopHit) | 59 |

== Release history ==
Release history for "Love Me to Heaven"
| Region | Date | Format | Label | Ref. |
|---|---|---|---|---|
| Various | March 21, 2025 | Digital download; streaming | Republic | |
