= Five Albums. One Night. The World Tour =

2023–24 concert tour by the Jonas Brothers

- World tour by Jonas Brothers
- Promotional poster
- Location: Asia; Europe; North America; Oceania; South America
- Associated album: The Album and various
- Start date: August 12, 2023
- End date: October 16, 2024
- No. of shows: 106
- Supporting acts: Lawrence; Putri Ariani; Deleasa; Selfish Sons; Benito Cerati; Delfina Campos; Max Schneider

Jonas Brothers concert chronology
- Jonas Brothers on Broadway (2023); Five Albums. One Night. The World Tour (2023–2024); Jonas20: Greetings from Your Hometown Tour (2025)

Five Albums. One Night. The World Tour (also referred as the World Tour or simply the Tour) was the twelfth concert tour by American pop rock band Jonas Brothers, in promotion of their sixth studio album, The Album (2023).

The tour was conceptualized to feature all songs from five of the band's studio albums from 2007 to 2023 on the same night. It began on August 12, 2023, in New York City, New York, and concluded on October 16, 2024, in Krakow, Poland.

== Background ==
Plans for a new tour began as soon as the band started producing their sixth studio album. In preparation for the release of their album and the upcoming tour, the band held a limited five-night Broadway engagement at the Marquis Theatre in New York City from March 14 to March 18, 2023, marking the Broadway debut of Kevin Jonas (Note: Both Nick and Joe had previously performed on Broadway as children, prior to the band's formation.) and the band itself. Each night, they played the entire track list of one of their four studio albums released between 2007 and 2019, with the upcoming album on the fifth and final night.

In April 2023, after Broadway, the band announced a concert for Yankee Stadium, playing the entirety of their five studio albums. Originally intended to be a one night-only concert for August 12, 2023, the following week of the original announcement, a second date was announced for August 13. The band continued to play various shows throughout April 2023 at the Royal Albert Hall in London, at The Theatre at Ace Hotel in Los Angeles, at Tannahill's Tavern in Dallas-Fort Worth, at the Baltimore Soundstage in Baltimore and the Something in the Water Festival in Virginia Beach.

On May 2, 2023, the tour was officially announced, with Yankee Stadium's dates serving as the kickoff, to support and perform all songs from The Album, as well as perform all songs from their previous four albums: Jonas Brothers (2007), A Little Bit Longer (2008), Lines, Vines and Trying Times (2009) and Happiness Begins (2019) at every concert. On July 27, 2023, the band announced international dates, adding up to 50 concerts, including North America, Europe and Australia.

The tour's set list was composed of over 67 songs from the five studio albums released by the band between 2007 and 2023, as well as the standalone singles, "What a Man Gotta Do", "Leave Before You Love Me", and "Remember This", as well as Nick Jonas' "Jealous" and DNCE's "Cake by the Ocean".

== Critical reception ==
The tour received positive reviews from critics. Rolling Stone staff writer Brittany Spanos called it a "massive show" and wrote that the tour is "an ambitious feat from any group", noting that "it's their version of Eras Tour, with the boys and their massive E-Street-like band tackling over 60 songs from five of their six albums".

== Set list ==
This set list is from the concert on August 12, 2023, in New York City. It may not represent all concerts for the tour.

1. "Wings" (instrumental)
2. "Celebrate!"
3. "What a Man Gotta Do"
4. "S.O.S."
5. "Hold On"
6. "Goodnight and Goodbye"
7. "That's Just the Way We Roll"
8. "Still in Love with You"
9. "Australia"
10. "Hollywood"
11. "Just Friends"
12. "Games"
13. "Hello Beautiful"
14. "Inseparable"
15. "Take a Breath"
16. "When You Look Me in the Eyes"
17. "Year 3000"
18. "Summer Baby"
19. "Vacation Eyes"
20. "Sail Away"
21. "Little Bird"
22. "A Little Bit Longer"
23. "Can't Have You"
24. "Sorry"
25. "BB Good"
26. "Shelf"
27. "Got Me Going Crazy"
28. "Video Girl"
29. "One Man Show"
30. "Pushin' Me Away"
31. "Tonight"
32. "Lovebug"
33. "Burnin' Up"
34. "Americana"
35. "Summer in the Hamptons"
36. "Waffle House"
37. "Montana Sky"
38. "Miracle"
39. "Fly with Me"
40. "Hey Baby"
41. "Poison Ivy"
42. "Much Better"
43. "World War III"
44. "Don't Speak"
45. "What Did I Do to Your Heart"
46. "Paranoid"
47. "Turn Right"
48. "Before the Storm"
49. "Black Keys"
50. "Jealous"
51. "Cake by the Ocean"
52. "Walls"
53. "Comeback"
54. "Rollercoaster"
55. "Strangers"
56. "Used to Be"
57. "Cool"
58. "Trust"
59. "Every Single Time"
60. "Happy When I'm Sad"
61. "Don't Throw It Away"
62. "Love Her"
63. "Hesitate"
64. "I Believe"
65. "Only Human"
66. "Sucker"
67. "Leave Before You Love Me"

Alterations

- During the August 12 and 13, 2023, concerts, "Burnin' Up" was performed with the band's former bodyguard Robert "Big Rob" Feggans while "Walls" was performed with Jon Bellion and Kirk Franklin.
- During the August 13, 2023, concert, Jimmy Fallon came on stage to perform the song "Mr. Brightside".
- During the August 15, 2023, concert, Kyle Gordon and Audrey Trullinger, under their respective pseudonyms DJ Crazy Times and Ms. Biljana Electronica invited on stage by Nick and Kevin to perform "Planet of the Bass".
- Due to State Fair time constraints, the September 1, 2023 concert was shortened resulting in "Goodnight and Goodbye", "Inseparable", "Vacation Eyes", "Sail Away", "Little Bird", "A Little Bit Longer", "Can't Have You", "Sorry", "Americana", "Summer in the Hamptons", "Miracle", "Turn Right", "Before the Storm", "Black Keys", "Walls", "Love Her", "Hesitate" and "I Believe" being cut from the set list as well as the band not taking their typical Intermission following "Burnin' Up".
- During the October 9, 2023, concert, Stephen Sanchez came on stage to perform the song "Until I Found You".
- During the October 29, 2023, concert, Switchfoot, came on stage to perform their songs, "Dare You to Move" and "Meant to Live," while lead vocalist, Jon Foreman came on stage to perform "Twenty-Four".
- During the November 11, 2023, concert, Michael Bublé came on stage to perform the song "Feeling Good", while The Beaches came on stage to perform "Blame Brett".
- During the December 6 and 7, 2023 concerts, Frankie Jonas came on stage to perform "Cherub".
- During the December 9, 2023 concert, Jack Black came on stage to perform "Peaches", while OneRepublic lead singer Ryan Tedder came on stage to perform "Sucker".

== Tour dates ==
List of 2023 concerts
Date (2023)	City	Country	Venue	Opening act(s)	Attendance	Revenue
August 12	New York City	United States	Yankee Stadium	Lawrence	—	—
August 13	New York City	United States	Yankee Stadium	Lawrence	—	—
August 15	Boston	United States	TD Garden	Lawrence	—	—
August 16	Boston	United States	TD Garden	Lawrence	—	—
August 17	Uncasville	United States	Mohegan Sun Arena	Lawrence	—	—
August 19	Toronto	Canada	Rogers Centre	Lawrence	—	—
August 22	Indianapolis	United States	Gainbridge Fieldhouse	Lawrence	—	—
August 24	Detroit	United States	Little Caesars Arena	Lawrence	—	—
August 25	Chicago	United States	Wrigley Field	Lawrence	—	—
August 27	St. Louis	United States	Enterprise Center	Lawrence	—	—
August 30	Arlington	United States	Globe Life Field	Lawrence	—	—
September 1 (Note: The September 1, 2023, concert in Saint Paul was part of the Minnesota State Fair.)	Saint Paul	United States	Minnesota State Fairgrounds	Lawrence	—	—
September 3	Austin	United States	Moody Center	Lawrence	—	—
September 6	Phoenix	United States	Footprint Center	Lawrence	—	—
September 8	Paradise (Note: Labeled as Las Vegas in promotional material.)	United States	MGM Grand Garden Arena	Lawrence	—	—
September 9	Los Angeles	United States	Dodger Stadium	Lawrence	—	—
September 11	Sacramento	United States	Golden 1 Center	Lawrence	—	—
September 14	Denver	United States	Ball Arena	Lawrence	—	—
September 16	Omaha	United States	CHI Health Center Omaha	Lawrence	—	—
September 18	Cleveland	United States	Rocket Mortgage FieldHouse	Lawrence	—	—
September 21	Philadelphia	United States	Wells Fargo Center	Lawrence	—	—
September 22	Baltimore	United States	CFG Bank Arena	Lawrence	—	—
September 23	Washington, D.C.	United States	Capital One Arena	Lawrence	—	—
September 25	Pittsburgh	United States	PPG Paints Arena	Lawrence	—	—
September 26	Lexington	United States	Rupp Arena	Lawrence	—	—
September 28	Raleigh	United States	PNC Arena	Lawrence	—	—
September 30	Charlotte	United States	Spectrum Center	Lawrence	—	—
October 1	Atlanta	United States	State Farm Arena	Lawrence	—	—
October 3	Tulsa	United States	BOK Center	Lawrence	—	—
October 5	San Antonio	United States	Frost Bank Center	Lawrence	—	—
October 7	Houston	United States	Toyota Center	Lawrence	—	—
October 9	Nashville	United States	Bridgestone Arena	Lawrence	—	—
October 10	Columbia	United States	Colonial Life Arena	Lawrence	—	—
October 12	Tampa	United States	Amalie Arena	Lawrence	—	—
October 13	Orlando	United States	Amway Center	Lawrence	—	—
October 14	Miami	United States	Kaseya Center	Lawrence	—	—
October 16	Orlando	United States	Amway Center	Lawrence	—	—
October 18	Atlanta	United States	State Farm Arena	Lawrence	—	—
October 20	Nashville	United States	Bridgestone Arena	Lawrence	—	—
October 22	Austin	United States	Moody Center	Lawrence	—	—
October 28	San Diego	United States	Viejas Arena	Lawrence	—	—
October 29	Anaheim	United States	Honda Center	Lawrence	—	—
November 2	Fresno	United States	Save Mart Center	Lawrence	—	—
November 4	West Valley City	United States	Maverik Center	Lawrence	—	—
November 5	Nampa	United States	Ford Idaho Center	Lawrence	—	—
November 7	Spokane	United States	Spokane Arena	Lawrence	—	—
November 9	Portland	United States	Moda Center	Lawrence	—	—
November 10	Seattle	United States	Climate Pledge Arena	Lawrence	—	—
November 11	Vancouver	Canada	Rogers Arena	Lawrence	—	—
November 14	Edmonton	Canada	Rogers Place	Lawrence	—	—
November 16	Winnipeg	Canada	Canada Life Centre	Lawrence	—	—
November 19	Saint Paul	United States	Xcel Energy Center	Lawrence	—	—
November 20	Milwaukee	United States	Fiserv Forum	Lawrence	—	—
November 21	Grand Rapids	United States	Van Andel Arena	Lawrence	—	—
November 27	Buffalo	United States	KeyBank Center	Lawrence	—	—
November 29	Ottawa	Canada	Canadian Tire Centre	Lawrence	—	—
December 1	Montreal	Canada	Bell Centre	Lawrence	—	—
December 2	Albany	United States	MVP Arena	Lawrence	—	—
December 3	Washington, D.C.	United States	Capital One Arena	Lawrence	—	—
December 6	Newark	United States	Prudential Center	Lawrence	—	—
December 7	Newark	United States	Prudential Center	Lawrence	—	—
December 9	New York City	United States	Barclays Center	Lawrence	—	—

List of 2024 concerts
Date (2024)	City	Country	Venue	Opening act(s)	Attendance	Revenue
February 22	Pasay (Note: Labeled as Manila in promotional material.)	Philippines	SM Mall of Asia Arena	—N/a	—	—
February 24	Tangerang (Note: Labeled as Jakarta in promotional material.)	Indonesia	Indonesia Convention Exhibition	Putri Ariani	—	—
February 27	Auckland	New Zealand	Spark Arena	—N/a	—	—
March 1	Sydney	Australia	Qudos Bank Arena	Selfish Sons	—	—
March 2	Sydney	Australia	Qudos Bank Arena	Selfish Sons	—	—
March 5	Brisbane	Australia	Brisbane Entertainment Centre	Selfish Sons	—	—
March 8	Melbourne	Australia	Rod Laver Arena	Selfish Sons	—	—
March 9	Melbourne	Australia	Rod Laver Arena	Selfish Sons	—	—
April 16	São Paulo	Brazil	Allianz Parque	—N/a	—	—
April 19	Bogotá	Colombia	Movistar Arena	—N/a	—	—
April 21	Lima	Peru	Costa 21	—N/a	—	—
April 23	Santiago	Chile	Estadio Bicentenario de La Florida	Benito Cerati; DJ Deleasa	—	—
April 25	Buenos Aires	Argentina	Movistar Arena	Delfina Campos; DJ Deleasa	—	—
April 26	Buenos Aires	Argentina	Movistar Arena	Delfina Campos; DJ Deleasa	—	—
April 27	Buenos Aires	Argentina	Movistar Arena	Delfina Campos; DJ Deleasa	—	—
April 30	Cancún	México	Estadio Andrés Quintana Roo	—N/a	—	—
May 3	Mexico City	México	Mexico City Arena	Max Schneider	—	—
May 6	Monterrey	México	Arena Monterrey	Max Schneider	—	—
June 22 (Note: The June 22, 2024, concert in Lisbon was part of Rock in Rio Lisboa.)	Lisbon	Portugal	Parque Tejo	—N/a	—	—
September 9	Belfast	Northern Ireland	SSE Arena	Mimi Webb	—	—
September 10	Dublin	Ireland	3Arena	Mimi Webb	—	—
September 12	Manchester	England	Co-op Live	Mimi Webb	—	—
September 13	Glasgow	Scotland	OVO Hydro	Mimi Webb	—	—
September 15	Birmingham	England	Utilita Arena Birmingham	Mimi Webb	—	—
September 16	London	England	The O_{2} Arena	Mimi Webb	—	—
September 17	London	England	The O_{2} Arena	Mimi Webb	—	—
September 20	Munich	Germany	Olympiahalle	Mimi Webb	—	—
September 22	Vienna	Austria	Wiener Stadthalle	Mimi Webb	—	—
September 24	Milan	Italy	Mediolanum Forum	Mimi Webb	—	—
September 26	Barcelona	Spain	Palau Sant Jordi	Mimi Webb	—	—
September 28	Lyon	France	LDLC Arena	Mimi Webb	—	—
September 29	Zürich	Switzerland	Hallenstadion	Mimi Webb	—	—
October 1	Antwerp	Belgium	Sportpaleis	Mimi Webb	—	—
October 2	Cologne	Germany	Lanxess Arena	Mimi Webb	—	—
October 3	Amsterdam	Netherlands	Ziggo Dome	Mimi Webb	—	—
October 6	Oslo	Norway	Oslo Spektrum	Mimi Webb	—	—
October 8	Copenhagen	Denmark	Royal Arena	Mimi Webb	—	—
October 9	Hamburg	Germany	Barclays Arena	Mimi Webb	—	—
October 13	Paris	France	Accor Arena	Mimi Webb	—	—
October 15	Prague	Czech Republic	O_{2} Arena	Mimi Webb	—	—
October 16	Kraków	Poland	Tauron Arena Kraków	Mimi Webb	—	—
Total					—	—

== Cancelled shows ==
Date	City	Country	Venue	Reason
October 23, 2023	Houston	United States	Toyota Center	—N/a
October 27, 2023	Paradise	United States	MGM Grand Garden Arena	—N/a
November 17, 2023	Grand Forks	United States	Alerus Center	Logistical reasons pertaining to performance on ESPN
