= Aldae =

American songwriter and producer

- Aldae in 2023

Background information
- Born: Gregory Eric Hein
- Origin: Arlington, Texas, U.S.
- Genres: Pop; R&B; dance; hip hop
- Occupations: Songwriter; record producer; singer
- Years active: 2016–present
- Labels: Legends Only; Columbia

Gregory Eric Hein, known professionally as Aldae (homonymous with "all day"), is an American songwriter and record producer. He has co-written songs for a variety of artists including Justin Bieber, Shawn Mendes, Selena Gomez, Marshmello, John Legend, Machine Gun Kelly, Khalid, Jackson Wang, and Tainy among others. In 2023, Aldae co-wrote Miley Cyrus' record-breaking single "Flowers", for which he achieved his first Billboard Hot 100 No. 1.

== Career ==
Aldae grew up in Arlington, Texas, where he was exposed to music listening to KIIS-FM and began writing songs as young as ten years old. He began his career by uploading original music to YouTube, and was signed to Columbia Records as a solo artist in 2016, before shifting his focus to collaborating with other artists. He adopted the moniker Aldae as a reference to spending "all day" in a recording studio.

After moving to Los Angeles, his songwriting caught the attention of Pulse Music Group, where he signed a publishing deal in 2019. Soon after, Aldae co-wrote the single "OK Not to Be OK", released by Marshmello and Demi Lovato in September 2020 in partnership with non-profit Hope for the Day to raise awareness around suicide prevention and mental health education.

After being introduced to Justin Bieber through Skrillex and DJ Tay, Aldae co-wrote 5 songs for his 2021 album Justice: "2 Much," "As I Am," "Unstable," "Somebody," and "There She Go." Aldae received a Grammy nomination for Album of the Year at the 64th GRAMMY Awards for his contributions to the album.

In February 2022 Aldae released his debut single "Long Way From Texas" followed by his solo project ALDAE – Vol. 1 in April.

Aldae co-wrote Miley Cyrus' single "Flowers," released January 12, 2023, with Cyrus and Michael Pollack. Originally written as a piano ballad, the song came together "within an hour" according to Aldae. The song debuted at No. 1 on the Billboard Hot 100 and topped the chart for 8 total weeks, as well as the Pop Airplay chart for 10 weeks. On Spotify, "Flowers" broke the record for the most weekly streams for two consecutive weeks, and became the fastest song to reach 1 billion streams on the platform. Aldae also co-wrote two other tracks on Cyrus' album Endless Summer Vacation: "Muddy Feet" and "Wonder Woman." "Flowers" was awarded two Grammy Awards at the 2024 Grammy Awards: Best Pop Solo Performance and Record Of The Year. He cowrote Ego by Halsey of The Great Impersonator.

== Songwriting and production credits ==
List of singles as songwriter and producer, showing year released, artist, song title, and album
Year	Artist	Song	Album	Produced
2019	Merk & Kremont	"Kids"	Non-album single	—
2019	Madison Ryann Ward	"Beyond Me"	Beyond Me	—
2019	Yultron	"Westcoast" (with Jay Park)	On Fire	—
2019	The Rubens	"Falling Asleep at the Wheel" (with Vic Mensa)	Non-album single	✓
2019	Rich Brian	"Yellow" (featuring Bekon)	The Sailor	—
2019	Rich Brian	"Rapapapa" (featuring RZA)	The Sailor	—
2019	Rich Brian	"Curious"	The Sailor	—
2019	Rich Brian	"Slow Down Turbo"	The Sailor	—
2019	Rich Brian	"No Worries"	The Sailor	—
2019	Jackson Wang	"I Love You 3000 II" (with Stephanie Poetri)	Head in the Clouds II	—
2019	Joji	"Walking" (with Jackson Wang featuring Swae Lee and Major Lazer)	Head in the Clouds II	—
2019	Rich Brian	"2 The Face" (with Higher Brothers)	Head in the Clouds II	✓
2019	Jackson Wang	"Bullet to the Heart"	Mirrors	—
2019	Jackson Wang	"Dway!"	Mirrors	—
2019	Jackson Wang	"On The Rocks"	Mirrors	—
2019	Jackson Wang	"Unless I'm With You"	Mirrors	—
2020	Stephanie Poetri	"Do You Love Me"	Non-album single	✓
2020	Kito	"Alone With You" (featuring AlunaGeorge)	Non-album single	—
2020	Lukas Graham	"Scars"	Non-album single	—
2020	Aaron Carpenter	"You"	Non-album single	—
2020	Trevor Daniel	"Things We Do For Love"	Nicotine	✓
2020	Go-Jo	"No One Else"	Non-album single	—
2020	Kina	"Feel Again" (featuring Au/Ra)	Things I Wanted To Tell You	—
2020	Carlie Hanson	"Stealing All My Friends"	DestroyDestroyDestroyDestroy	—
2020	Bryce Vine	"Strawberry Water"	Problems	—
2020	Marshmello	"OK Not To Be OK" (with Demi Lovato)	Dancing with the Devil... the Art of Starting Over (Expanded Edition)	—
2020	Machine Gun Kelly	"All I Know" (featuring Trippie Redd)	Tickets to my Downfall	—
2020	Cxloe	"Plans"	Heavy, Pt. 1	—
2020	Jutes	"Jet Black Mascara"	A Really Bad Dream	—
2020	Arashi	"In The Summer"	This is Arashi	—
2020	Muni Long	"Nekkid" (with YFN Lucci)	Black Like This	—
2020	Sam Feldt	"Home Sweet Home" (featuring Alma and Digital Farm Animals)	Non-album single	—
2020	Grey	"Jaded"	Dark	—
2021	PrettyMuch	"Free"	Smackables	—
2021	Celeste	"Some Goodbyes Come With Hellos"	Not Your Muse	—
2021	Selena Gomez	"Vicio"	Revelación	—
2021	Justin Bieber	"As I Am" (featuring Khalid)	Justice	—
2021	Justin Bieber	"Unstable" (featuring The Kid Laroi)	Justice	✓
2021	Justin Bieber	"2 Much"	Justice	—
2021	Justin Bieber	"Somebody"	Justice	—
2021	Justin Bieber	"There She Go" (featuring Lil Uzi Vert)	Justice (Triple Chucks Deluxe)	—
2021	Demi Lovato	"15 Minutes"	Dancing with the Devil... the Art of Starting Over	—
2021	Morray	"That's On God"	Street Sermons	—
2021	Sangiovanni	"Malibu" (with Trevor Daniel)	Sangiovanni	—
2021	Anitta	"Furiosa"	F9: The Fast Saga (Original Motion Picture Soundtrack)	—
2021	Jxdn	"Tonight" (featuring Iann Dior)	Tell Me About Tomorrow	—
2021	Yungblud	"Fleabag"	Non-album single	—
2021	Shawn Mendes	"Summer of Love" (with Tainy)	Non-album single	—
2021	Surfaces	"C'est La Vie" (with Thomas Rhett)	Pacifico (Deluxe)	✓
2021	Westlife	"Alone Together"	Wild Dreams	—
2021	Jimmy Fallon	"It Was a... (Masked Christmas)" (featuring Ariana Grande and Megan Thee Stallion)	Non-album single	—
2022	Machine Gun Kelly	"Ay!" (featuring Lil Wayne)	Mainstream Sellout	—
2022	Masn	"Love Me For Me"	Non-album single	—
2022	Aldae	"Long Way From Texas"	Aldae – Vol. 1	✓
2022	Aldae	"Too Far"	Aldae – Vol. 1	✓
2022	Aldae	"Safe Word"	Aldae – Vol. 1	✓
2022	Aldae	"Heart Is So Sick"	Aldae – Vol. 1	✓
2022	Aldae	"Poltergeist"	Aldae – Vol. 1	✓
2022	Aldae	"God Complex"	Aldae – Vol. 1	—
2022	Aldae	"Honeymoon"	Aldae – Vol. 1	✓
2022	Anitta	"Ur Baby" (featuring Khalid)	Versions of Me	—
2022	Moore Kismet	"Wasteland"	UNIVERSE	—
2022	MK	"Teardrops" (with Paul Woolford featuring Majid Jordan)	Non-album single	—
2022	Becky G	"Bailé Con Mi Ex"	Esquemas	—
2022	Umi	"Sorry"	Forest in the City	✓
2022	The Chainsmokers	"Something Different"	So Far So Good	—
2022	Marshmello	"Numb" (with Khalid)	Non-album single	—
2022	Joy Oladokun	"That's How God Made Me"	Anything's Possible (Motion Picture Soundtrack)	—
2022	Machine Gun Kelly	"Last November"	Mainstream Sellout (Life in Pink Deluxe)	—
2022	Jxdn	"Beautiful Boy"	28 (Songs for Cooper)	✓
2022	Chris Brown	"Hate Being Human"	Breezy (Deluxe)	—
2022	Mabel	"Crying On The Dance Floor"	About Last Night...	—
2022	Mabel	"I Love Your Girl"	About Last Night...	—
2022	Marshmello	"American Psycho" (with Mae Muller featuring Trippie Redd)	Non-album single	—
2022	Ali Gatie	"Crying in the Rain"	Who Hurt You?	✓
2022	Ali Gatie	"Can't Give Up"	Who Hurt You?	—
2022	Yungblud	"Cruel Kids"	Yungblud	—
2022	John Legend	"Honey" (featuring Muni Long)	Legend	—
2022	Vicetone	"Always Running"	Non-album single	—
2022	Sueco	"Last Thing I Do"	It Was Fun While It Lasted	—
2022	Sueco	"Bad Vibes"	It Was Fun While It Lasted	—
2022	Khalid	"Satellite"	Non-album single	—
2022	David Guetta	"Together" (with Morten featuring Aldae)	Episode 2	—
2022	Fletcher	"Healing"	Girl of my Dreams (Deluxe)	—
2022	Adam DeVine	"Know My Name (Bumper Version)"	Pitch Perfect: Bumper in Berlin (soundtrack)	—
2023	Lukas Graham	"Wish You Were Here" (featuring Khalid)	4 (The Pink Album)	—
2023	Charlieonnafriday	"That's What I Get"	Non-album single	✓
2023	Skrillex	"Don't Go" (with Justin Bieber & Don Toliver)	Don't Get Too Close	—
2023	Skrillex	"Inhale Exhale" (with Aluna and Kito)	Quest for Fire	—
2023	Miley Cyrus	"Flowers"	Endless Summer Vacation	—
2023	Miley Cyrus	"Used To Be Young"	Endless Summer Vacation	—
2023	Miley Cyrus	"Muddy Feet" (featuring Sia)	Endless Summer Vacation	—
2023	Miley Cyrus	"Wonder Woman"	Endless Summer Vacation	—
2023	Illenium	"With All My Heart" (with Jvke)	Illenium	—
2023	Jonas Brothers	"Waffle House"	The Album	—
2023	Jonas Brothers	"Summer Baby"	The Album	—
2023	Jonas Brothers	"Montana Sky"	The Album	—
2023	Jonas Brothers	"Little Bird"	The Album	—
2023	Jonas Brothers	"Summer In The Hamptons"	The Album	—
2023	Maroon 5	"Middle Ground"	Non-album single	—
2023	SLANDER	"With I Could Forget" (with blackbear & Bring Me The Horizon)	Non-album single	—
2023	gnash	"Time"	The Art of Letting Go	—
2023	Ari Abdul	"Last Breath"	CCTV	—
2023	Natalie Jane	"I'm Good (feat. charlieonafriday)"	Non-album single	—
2023	Leigh-Anne	"Don't Say Love"	Non-album single	—
2023	Loud Luxury	"If Only I" (with Two Friends featuring Bebe Rexha)	Non-album single	—
2023	Boys World	"Funeral"	Me, My Girls & I	—
2023	Henry Moodie	"pick up the phone"	Non-album single	✓
2023	Trippie Redd	"Left 4 Dead"	A Love Letter To You 5	✓
2023	Quavo	"Hold Me"	Rocket Power	✓
2023	Sueco	"Yours" (feat. Bea Miller)	Non-album single	✓
2023	Jessie Murph	"Wild Ones" (feat. Jelly Roll)	Non-album single	—
2023	TOMORROW X TOGETHER	"Deep Down"	The Name Chapter: FREEFALL	—
2023	blink-182	"ONE MORE TIME"	One More Time...	—
2023	blink-182	"CUT ME OFF"	One More Time...	—
2023	blink-182	"SEE YOU"	One More Time...	—
2023	Jung Kook	"Closer to You" (feat. Major Lazer)	GOLDEN	—
2023	Jung Kook	"Shot Glass of Tears"	GOLDEN	—
2024	FLETCHER	"Lead Me On"	IN SEARCH OF THE ANTIDOTE	—
2024	FLETCHER	"Maybe I Am"	IN SEARCH OF THE ANTIDOTE	—
2024	FLETCHER	"Pretending"	IN SEARCH OF THE ANTIDOTE	—
2024	FLETCHER	"Antidote"	IN SEARCH OF THE ANTIDOTE	—
2024	charlieonnafriday	"When I'm Leavin"	Non-Album single	—
2024	jxdn	"HOW FAR"	WHEN THE MUSIC STOPS	✓
2024	jxdn	"STRANGER"	WHEN THE MUSIC STOPS	—
2024	Henry Moodle	"beat up car"	Non-album single	✓
2024	Jackson Wang, BIBI	"Feeling Lucky"	Non-album single	✓
2024	Shakira	"Nassau"	Las Mujeres Ya No Lloran	✓
2024	Armin van Burren, David Guetta	In The Dark (feat. Aldae)	Non-album single	—
2024	David Guetta, OneRepublic	"I Don't Wanna Wait"	Non-album single	—
2024	Khalid	"It's All Good"	Sincere	—
2024	jxdn	"WHAT THE HELL"	Non-album single	✓
2024	Jelly Roll	"Little Light"	Beautifully Broken	—
2024	Halsey	"Ego"	The Great Impersonator	—
2024	Rosé	"Two Years"	Rosie	—
2024	Rosé	"Gameboy"	Rosie	—
2025	Kane Brown	"Gorgeous"	The High Road	—
2025	Lisa	"Rapunzel" (featuring Megan Thee Stallion)	Alter Ego	—
2025	Nardo Wick	"Have All Of Me"	WICK	—
2025	Myles Smith	"Dreamers"	A Minute, A Moment...	—
2025	Miley Cyrus	"End of the World"	Something Beautiful	—
2025	Miley Cyrus	"Pretend You're God"	Something Beautiful	—
2025	Miley Cyrus	"Reborn"	Something Beautiful	—
2025	Jon Bellion	"FATHER FIGURE"	FATHER FIGURE	—
2025	Jon Bellion	"OBLIVIOUS"	FATHER FIGURE	—
2025	Dom Innarella	"Jersey In July"	Single	✓
2025	Dom Innarella	"Call Me"	Single	✓
2025	Bailey Zimmerman	"At The Same Time"	Single	—
2025	BigXthaPlug	"Box Me Up (feat. Jelly Roll)"	I Hope You're Happy	—
2025	Miley Cyrus	"Lockdown (feat. David Byrne)	Something Beautiful	—
2026	Dermot Kennedy	"Funeral"	The Weight of the Woods	
2026	Jon Bellion & Swae Lee	"Two Car Garage"	Single	
2026	Dom Innarella	"Magic"	Single	
2026	BTS	"FYA"	ARIRANG	—
2026	BTS	"Merry Go Round"	ARIRANG	—
2026	BTS	"One More Night"	ARIRANG	—
2026	Miley Cyrus	"Younger You"		
2026	Yeonjun	"No More Disco"	No Labels: Part 02	✓
