= We The Band =

American rhythm and blues band

- Genres: Rhythm and blues
- Years active: 2015–present
- Label: Avex Music Group
- Members: Harv; Tay James; Julian Michael; Devin “Stixx” Taylor; Dr. O

We The Band are an American rhythm and blues band. They are known for their performances as the live backing band of Justin Bieber. The group consists of bassist/vocalist Harv, DJ Tay James, guitarist/vocalist Julian Michael, drummer Devin “Stixx” Taylor, and keyboardist Dr. O.

== History ==
The band was originally formed through the meeting of Tay James and Bieber in 2009 after James graduated from college. He was hired to become Bieber's DJ. This event was followed by Harv taking on the role of music director in Bieber's live band, which was later filled out by Taylor and Michael. As individuals, the group's members have played with Eminem, Snoop Dogg, Post Malone, and Mary J. Blige.

In 2021, We The Band played alongside Bieber during his NPR Tiny Desk performance.

We The Band backed up Bieber on his 2015 Purpose World Tour and his 2022 Justice World Tour. Following the cancellation of Bieber's 2022 world tour due to his health issues, the band began to focus on writing and creating its own original music.

In June 2025, We The Band signed a record deal with Avex Music Group, announcing that the band's debut album would premiere later in the year. Shortly after signing the deal, the band released its debut single, One & Only.

== Influences ==
We The Band draws influence from musical artists like Earth, Wind & Fire, Aaliyah, Missy Elliott, OneRepublic, and Paramore.
