= Justice World Tour =

2022 concert tour by Justin Bieber

- Tour by Justin Bieber
- Promotional poster for the North American dates
- Location: Europe; North America; South America
- Associated album: Changes; Justice
- Start date: February 18, 2022
- End date: September 4, 2022
- Legs: 3
- No. of shows: 49

Justin Bieber concert chronology
- Purpose World Tour (2016–2017); Justice World Tour (2022); ...

The Justice World Tour (Note: formerly known as The Changes Tour and The Justin Bieber World Tour) was the fourth concert tour by Canadian singer Justin Bieber. The tour was in support of his fifth and sixth studio albums, Changes (2020) and Justice (2021).

Promoted by T-Mobile, the tour was originally set to begin on May 14, 2020, in Seattle and to conclude on September 26, 2020, in East Rutherford, New Jersey. However, due to the COVID-19 pandemic, all of the original planned dates were postponed to 2021, and later to 2022. The tour officially began on February 18, 2022, in San Diego and was scheduled to end on March 25, 2023, in Kraków. However, the tour ended in Rio de Janeiro on September 4, 2022, due to Bieber prioritizing his health, after 49 shows in three continents, with the remaining shows being cancelled in February 2023.

The remainder of tour dates were cancelled in late 2022 after Bieber was diagnosed with Type 2 Ramsay Hunt syndrome.

== Background ==
During the last quarter of 2019, especially in December, Bieber started teasing his musical comeback via his social media. On December 20, Bieber tweeted that something was going to happen on the December 24, December 31, 2019, as well as on January 3 and 4, 2020. On December 24, he released a video on YouTube where he announced that he would release his fifth album during 2020, on December 31 was released trailer for Justin Bieber: Seasons, the first single of his fifth studio album "Yummy" was released on January 3, and on January 13 he announced the first round of dates for his new world tour, releasing North American dates. Jaden Smith and Kehlani were originally set to be opening acts. On March 6, 2020, several stadium dates were downsized to arena dates, with shows moved to arena venues adjacent to the stadiums. Bieber's team cited "unforeseen circumstances" and low ticket sales.

On April 1, 2020, it was announced the tour was postponed due to the ongoing COVID-19 pandemic. On July 23, Bieber released rescheduled tour dates set to be played in 2021. However, on April 30, 2021, Bieber announced that the tour was to be postponed to 2022. The new tour dates were announced on May 6, 2021. Jaden Smith, Eddie Benjamin, ¿Téo?, and Harry Hudson were announced as opening acts for North American dates. Bieber was accompanied by his backing band, We The Band. On November 15, 2021, Bieber announced an additional 98 dates, spanning into late 2022 and early 2023 with shows across North America, Europe, South America, Africa, Asia, and Oceania. On March 9, 2022, Bieber announced four shows in Japan. On March 24, 2022, Bieber announced two shows in Malaysia, a show in Indonesia and added an additional date in Japan. Additional dates were announced in Bahrain, the Philippines, Dubai, New Delhi, Sydney, Amsterdam, Dublin, and London.

On September 6, 2022, two days after the first concert in Latin America as part of the Rock in Rio festival, it was announced that all remaining dates of the tour would be postponed due to Bieber prioritizing his health. In a statement shared on social media, the singer said that "After getting off stage, the exhaustion overtook me and I realized that I need to make my health the priority right now. So I'm going to take a break from touring for the time being. I'm going to be OK, but I need time to rest and get better." On September 15, 2022, an announcement posted on the official page for the tour clarified that only the dates until October 18 had been cancelled, with "all other shows remaining as scheduled unless otherwise advised". However, on October 6, it was announced that the concert in Rio de Janeiro was the final performance of the tour, with the period of mass postponement extended to all the remaining shows, which had not been rescheduled.

== Set list ==
This set list is representative of the show on February 18, 2022, in San Diego. It is not representative of all concerts for the duration of the tour.

1. "Somebody"
2. "Hold On"
3. "Deserve You"
4. "Holy"
5. "Where Are Ü Now"
6. "What Do You Mean?"
7. "Yummy"
8. "Changes" / "Swap It Out" / "At Least For Now" / "Hold Tight"
9. "Love Yourself"
10. "Off My Face"
11. "Confident"
12. "All That Matters"
13. "Don't Go" / "Second Emotion" / "No Sense" / "Honest"
14. "Sorry"
15. "Love You Different"
16. "As I Am"
17. "Ghost"
18. "Lonely"
19. "2 Much"
20. "Intentions"
21. "Boyfriend"
22. "Baby"

Encore

23. "Peaches"
24. "Anyone"

=== Additional notes ===
- During the show in Los Angeles on March 7, Bieber welcomed Leon Bridges on stage to perform "River" and also performed "Don't Go" with Don Toliver, and "Intentions" with Quavo.
- During the show in Los Angeles on March 8, Bieber performed "Stay" with the Kid Laroi.
- During the shows in Atlanta on March 21 and 22, Bieber performed "Intentions" with Quavo.
- Starting on April 29 with the show in Houston, Bieber performed "Honest" with Don Toliver in place of "Don't Go".
- During the show in Brooklyn on June 3, Bieber performed "Attention" with Omah Lay.
- During the show in Rio de Janeiro on September 4, "Love You Different" and "Boyfriend" were not performed.

== Tour dates ==
List of concerts showing date, city, country and venue
Date	City	Country	Venue
North America
February 18, 2022	San Diego	United States	Pechanga Arena
February 28, 2022	San Jose	United States	SAP Center at San Jose
March 2, 2022	San Jose	United States	SAP Center at San Jose
March 4, 2022	Sacramento	United States	Golden 1 Center
March 7, 2022	Los Angeles	United States	Crypto.com Arena
March 8, 2022	Los Angeles	United States	Crypto.com Arena
March 11, 2022	Portland	United States	Moda Center
March 13, 2022	Salt Lake City	United States	Vivint Arena
March 16, 2022	Denver	United States	Ball Arena
March 18, 2022	Tulsa	United States	BOK Center
March 21, 2022	Atlanta	United States	State Farm Arena
March 22, 2022	Atlanta	United States	State Farm Arena
March 25, 2022	Toronto	Canada	Scotiabank Arena
March 27, 2022	Ottawa	Canada	Canadian Tire Centre
March 29, 2022	Montreal	Canada	Bell Centre
March 31, 2022	Newark	United States	Prudential Center
April 2, 2022 (Note: Originally scheduled to take place on April 4, 2022.)	Pittsburgh	United States	PPG Paints Arena
April 5, 2022 (Note: Originally scheduled to take place on April 6, 2022.)	Greensboro	United States	Greensboro Coliseum
April 7, 2022	Jacksonville	United States	VyStar Veterans Memorial Arena
April 9, 2022	Tampa	United States	Amalie Arena
April 11, 2022	Orlando	United States	Amway Center
April 13, 2022	Miami	United States	FTX Arena
April 19, 2022	Cincinnati	United States	Heritage Bank Center
April 21, 2022	Indianapolis	United States	Gainbridge Fieldhouse
April 24, 2022	Des Moines	United States	Wells Fargo Arena
April 27, 2022	Austin	United States	Moody Center
April 29, 2022	Houston	United States	Toyota Center
May 1, 2022	Dallas	United States	American Airlines Center
May 4, 2022	Kansas City	United States	T-Mobile Center
May 6, 2022	Minneapolis	United States	Target Center
May 9, 2022	Chicago	United States	United Center
May 10, 2022	Chicago	United States	United Center
May 12, 2022	Grand Rapids	United States	Van Andel Arena
May 14, 2022	Buffalo	United States	KeyBank Center
May 16, 2022	Columbus	United States	Schottenstein Center
May 18, 2022 (Note: Originally scheduled to take place on May 17, 2022.)	Nashville	United States	Bridgestone Arena
May 22, 2022	Monterrey	Mexico	Estadio Mobil Super
May 25, 2022	Mexico City	Mexico	Foro Sol
May 26, 2022	Mexico City	Mexico	Foro Sol
May 28, 2022	Guadalajara	Mexico	Estadio Tres de Marzo
June 3, 2022 (Note: Originally scheduled to take place on April 1, 2022.)	Brooklyn	United States	Barclays Center
June 5, 2022	Detroit	United States	Little Caesars Arena
Europe
July 31, 2022 (Note: The concert on July 31, 2022 in Lucca was part of Lucca Summer Festival.)	Lucca	Italy	Piazza Napoleon
August 3, 2022 (Note: The concert on August 3, 2022 in Skanderborg was part of Smukfest.)	Skanderborg	Denmark	Dyrehaven
August 5, 2022 (Note: The concert on August 5, 2022 in Malmö was part of Big Slap Festival.)	Malmö	Sweden	Nyhamnen
August 7, 2022 (Note: The concert on August 7, 2022 in Trondheim was part of Trondheim Summertime.)	Trondheim	Norway	Leangen Travbane
August 9, 2022	Helsinki	Finland	Kaisaniemi Park
August 12, 2022 (Note: The concert on August 13, 2022 in Budapest was part of Sziget Festival.)	Budapest	Hungary	Óbudai-sziget
South America
September 4, 2022 (Note: The concert on September 4, 2022 in Rio de Janeiro was part of Rock in Rio.)	Rio de Janeiro	Brazil	Barra Olympic Park

=== Cancelled shows ===
List of cancelled concerts, showing date, city, country, venue and reason for cancellation
Date	City	Country	Venue	Reason
February 26, 2022	Tacoma	United States	Tacoma Dome	COVID-19 cases
June 7, 2022	Toronto	Canada	Scotiabank Arena	Complications concerning Ramsay Hunt syndrome type 2
June 8, 2022	Toronto	Canada	Scotiabank Arena	Complications concerning Ramsay Hunt syndrome type 2
June 10, 2022	Washington, D.C.	United States	Capital One Arena	Complications concerning Ramsay Hunt syndrome type 2
June 13, 2022	New York City	United States	Madison Square Garden	Complications concerning Ramsay Hunt syndrome type 2
June 14, 2022	New York City	United States	Madison Square Garden	Complications concerning Ramsay Hunt syndrome type 2
June 16, 2022	Philadelphia	United States	Wells Fargo Center	Complications concerning Ramsay Hunt syndrome type 2
June 18, 2022	Uncasville	United States	Mohegan Sun Arena	Complications concerning Ramsay Hunt syndrome type 2
June 20, 2022	Boston	United States	TD Garden	Complications concerning Ramsay Hunt syndrome type 2
June 23, 2022 (Note: Originally scheduled to take place on April 25, 2022.)	St. Louis	United States	Enterprise Center	Complications concerning Ramsay Hunt syndrome type 2
June 24, 2022 (Note: The concert on June 24, 2022 in Milwaukee was due to be part of Summerfest.)	Milwaukee	United States	American Family Insurance Amphitheater	Complications concerning Ramsay Hunt syndrome type 2
June 28, 2022 (Note: Originally set to take place on February 20, 2022, but postponed due to positive COVID-19 cases within the crew.)	Las Vegas	United States	T-Mobile Arena	Complications concerning Ramsay Hunt syndrome type 2
June 30, 2022 (Note: Originally set to take place on February 22, 2022, but postponed due to positive COVID-19 cases within the crew.)	Glendale	United States	Gila River Arena	Complications concerning Ramsay Hunt syndrome type 2
July 2, 2022 (Note: Originally set to take place on February 24, 2022, but postponed due to positive COVID-19 cases within the crew.)	Inglewood	United States	Kia Forum	Complications concerning Ramsay Hunt syndrome type 2
July 3, 2022	Inglewood	United States	Kia Forum	Complications concerning Ramsay Hunt syndrome type 2
September 7, 2022	Santiago	Chile	Estadio Nacional de Chile	Health issues
September 10, 2022	La Plata	Argentina	Estadio Ciudad de La Plata	Health issues
September 11, 2022	La Plata	Argentina	Estadio Ciudad de La Plata	Health issues
September 14, 2022	São Paulo	Brazil	Allianz Parque	Health issues
September 15, 2022	São Paulo	Brazil	Allianz Parque	Health issues
September 28, 2022	Cape Town	South Africa	Cape Town Stadium	Health issues
October 1, 2022	Johannesburg	South Africa	FNB Stadium	Health issues
October 5, 2022	Sakhir	Bahrain	Al Dana Amphitheatre	Health issues
October 8, 2022	Dubai	United Arab Emirates	Coca-Cola Arena	Health issues
October 9, 2022	Dubai	United Arab Emirates	Coca-Cola Arena	Health issues
October 13, 2022	Tel Aviv	Israel	Yarkon Park	Health issues
October 18, 2022	New Delhi	India	Jawaharlal Nehru Stadium	Health issues
October 22, 2022	Kuala Lumpur	Malaysia	Bukit Jalil National Stadium	Health issues
October 25, 2022	Singapore		Singapore National Stadium	Health issues
October 29, 2022	Manila	Philippines	Cultural Center of the Philippines Complex	Health issues
November 2, 2022	Jakarta	Indonesia	Gelora Bung Karno Madya Stadium	Health issues
November 3, 2022	Jakarta	Indonesia	Gelora Bung Karno Madya Stadium	Health issues
November 6, 2022	Bangkok	Thailand	Rajamangala National Stadium	Health issues
November 9, 2022	Nagoya	Japan	Vantelin Dome	Health issues
November 12, 2022	Osaka	Japan	Osaka Dome	Health issues
November 13, 2022	Osaka	Japan	Osaka Dome	Health issues
November 16, 2022	Tokyo	Japan	Tokyo Dome	Health issues
November 17, 2022	Tokyo	Japan	Tokyo Dome	Health issues
November 22, 2022	Perth	Australia	HBF Park	Health issues
November 26, 2022	Melbourne	Australia	Marvel Stadium	Health issues
November 29, 2022	Sydney	Australia	Allianz Stadium	Health issues
November 30, 2022	Sydney	Australia	Allianz Stadium	Health issues
December 3, 2022	Brisbane	Australia	Suncorp Stadium	Health issues
December 7, 2022	Auckland	New Zealand	Mount Smart Stadium	Health issues
January 11, 2023	Amsterdam	Netherlands	Ziggo Dome	Health issues
January 13, 2023	Amsterdam	Netherlands	Ziggo Dome	Health issues
January 14, 2023	Amsterdam	Netherlands	Ziggo Dome	Health issues
January 16, 2023	Hamburg	Germany	Barclays Arena	Health issues
January 18, 2023	Zürich	Switzerland	Hallenstadion	Health issues
January 21, 2023	Lisbon	Portugal	Altice Arena	Health issues
January 23, 2023	Madrid	Spain	WiZink Center	Health issues
January 25, 2023	Barcelona	Spain	Palau Sant Jordi	Health issues
January 27, 2023	Bologna	Italy	Unipol Arena	Health issues
January 28, 2023	Bologna	Italy	Unipol Arena	Health issues
January 31, 2023	Cologne	Germany	Lanxess Arena	Health issues
February 2, 2023	Frankfurt	Germany	Festhalle Frankfurt	Health issues
February 4, 2023	Berlin	Germany	Mercedes-Benz Arena	Health issues
February 8, 2023	Glasgow	Scotland	OVO Hydro	Health issues
February 11, 2023	Aberdeen	Scotland	P&J Live	Health issues
February 13, 2023	London	England	The O_{2} Arena	Health issues
February 14, 2023	London	England	The O_{2} Arena	Health issues
February 16, 2023	London	England	The O_{2} Arena	Health issues
February 17, 2023	London	England	The O_{2} Arena	Health issues
February 22, 2023	Birmingham	England	Resorts World Arena	Health issues
February 23, 2023	Birmingham	England	Resorts World Arena	Health issues
February 25, 2023	Manchester	England	AO Arena	Health issues
February 26, 2023	Sheffield	England	Utilita Arena Sheffield	Health issues
February 28, 2023	Dublin	Ireland	3Arena	Health issues
March 2, 2023	Dublin	Ireland	3Arena	Health issues
March 4, 2023	Manchester	England	AO Arena	Health issues
March 6, 2023	Paris	France	Accor Arena	Health issues
March 7, 2023	Paris	France	Accor Arena	Health issues
March 9, 2023	Munich	Germany	Olympiahalle	Health issues
March 11, 2023	Budapest	Hungary	Budapest Sports Arena	Health issues
March 12, 2023	Prague	Czechia	O_{2} Arena	Health issues
March 15, 2023	Stockholm	Sweden	Tele2 Arena	Health issues
March 17, 2023	Copenhagen	Denmark	Royal Arena	Health issues
March 18, 2023	Copenhagen	Denmark	Royal Arena	Health issues
March 20, 2023	Antwerp	Belgium	Sportpaleis	Health issues
March 21, 2023	Antwerp	Belgium	Sportpaleis	Health issues
March 24, 2023	Vienna	Austria	Wiener Stadthalle	Health issues
March 25, 2023	Kraków	Poland	Tauron Arena	Health issues
