= The Album (Jonas Brothers album) =

2023 studio album by Jonas Brothers

- Standard cover

Studio album by Jonas Brothers
- Released: May 12, 2023
- Recorded: 2022
- Studios: Cove City Sound (Glen Cove); Jungle City (New York City); Opus Studios (Lake Grove)
- Genres: Americana; pop; yacht rock
- Length: 32:47
- Label: Republic
- Producers: Colin Brittain; Daniel Tashian; Ido Zmishlany; Johnny Simpson; Jon Bellion; Pete Nappi; The Diner; The Monsters & Strangerz; TenRoc

Jonas Brothers chronology
The Family Business (2023)	The Album (2023)	Live from the O2 London (2025)

Singles from The Album
- 1. "Wings" Released: February 24, 2023; 2. "Waffle House" Released: April 7, 2023; 3. "Summer Baby" Released: June 5, 2023

The Album is the sixth studio album by the American pop rock band Jonas Brothers. It was released on May 12, 2023, through Republic Records. The album features a sole guest appearance from Jon Bellion. Production was handled by Bellion himself, the Monsters & Strangerz, Pete Nappi, TenRoc, the Diner, Daniel Tashian, Ido Zmishlany, Johnny Simpson, and Colin Brittain. Regarded as a more mature endeavor for the band, critics noticed the adult contemporary sound of the record. The brothers conceived the album to reflect their state of mind, with lyrics about enjoying life, parenthood, and their relationships. The concept for the album was to create the "quintessential Jonas Brothers album" that would capture the 1970s sound that influenced the brothers as musical artists.

The album's release was supported by three singles, "Wings", "Waffle House", and "Summer Baby". It serves as the follow-up to their previous album, Happiness Begins (2019). It peaked at number three on the Billboard 200 in its debut week, logging the band's seventh top-ten entry on the chart. The Album was met with positive reviews from music critics for its summer-themed, feel-good vibes as well as the nostalgic influences on the record. To support The Album and their other four previous albums, the Jonas Brothers embarked on the Five Albums. One Night. The World Tour, which commenced on August 12, 2023, in New York City, New York, and concluded on October 16, 2024, in Krakow, Poland.

== Background and release ==
The sonic world for this album is really organic to what those records sound like back in the sixties and seventies, so Frankie Valli and the Four Seasons, Stevie Wonder, Earth Wind & Fire. 'Wings' was very inspired by that instrumentation. The rhythmic element is electrifying. It takes you back to the good old days.

— Nick Jonas on developing The Album, via press release

On February 25, 2020, during an interview on the Today show, Nick Jonas revealed that the group had been working on a new album with Ryan Tedder and that the details were "going to be announced in the next couple weeks", also hinting that "What a Man Gotta Do", a single that they had released the previous month, would serve as the potential lead single for it. On September 23, 2022, the group posted a picture of Nick, Joe, and Kevin Jonas in a recording studio with Jon Bellion, who was sitting at a piano, writing that they were in the process of creating the album, in which Joe also hinted at its completion.

On January 13, 2023, Nick appeared on The Kelly Clarkson Show, in which he shared that the album had been completed and that the Jonas Brothers were currently "kind of in that planning moment with the campaign, the album, the single – all the things". Exactly two weeks later, Nick, Joe, and Kevin sat down for an interview with Variety, in which they revealed that the album includes elements of 1970s pop and Americana "with a modern edge" and is partly influenced by the Bee Gees. Speaking to Vanity Fair, the band stated that they also took inspiration from Carole King and Jefferson Starship, while revealing the titles of a few songs from it: "Wings", "Montana Sky", "Vacation Eyes", "Little Bird", and "Waffle House". For the Grammy Awards, the brothers revealed America, Eagles, The Police and The Doobie Brothers as other sources of inspiration for the creation of the album.

American Songwriter noted that the Jonas Brothers were experimenting with a sound unfamiliar to their long-time fans, with the songs on the records featuring an "old-world-inspired collection" that is immersed in "exhilarating guitar pulls, horns, piano riffs, and even touches of disco". The magazine also stated that most of the influence on the sound for The Album came from bands and artists that inspired the band members as musicians and were still within them, but were rarely revealed, sonically, on their previous albums.

On January 29, Joe teased a snippet video of "Wings" through social media that showed him in a studio with both Nick and Kevin. The following day, all three brothers went on the Hollywood Walk of Fame, where they announced that the album would be titled The Album and was set to be released on May 5. On February 22, the brothers announced that its release had been pushed back exactly a week to May 12 in order to publish it alongside its vinyl version.

== Writing and recording ==
For the album, the band opted for a funk-inspired pop album with references to the late 1970s pop grooves of Stevie Wonder, Earth Wind & Fire, the Doobie Brothers and the Bee Gees, with the brothers stating they took inspiration from Oasis' "Wonderwall" and Paul McCartney's "Hey Jude" for providing the blueprint for songs on the record.

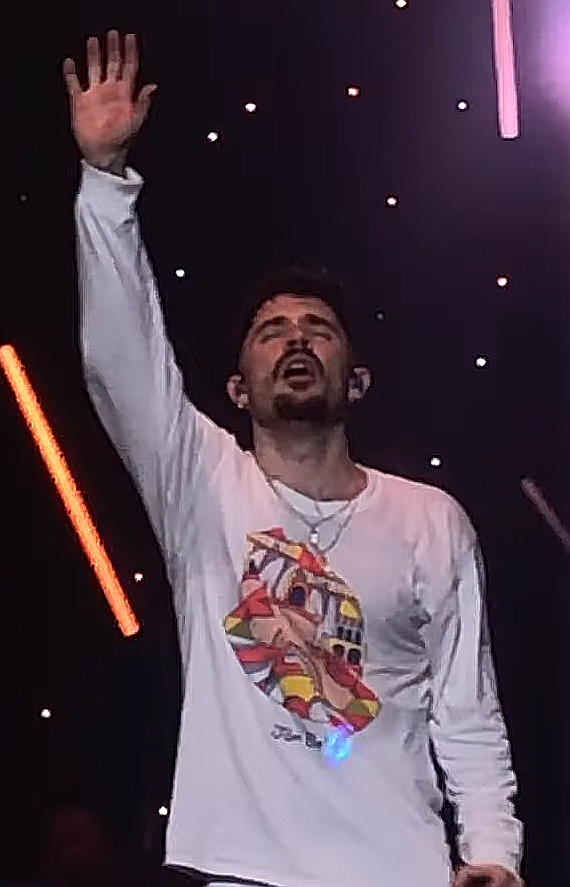
The Album features guest appearance by Jon Bellion (pictured), who co-produced all tracks.

Work on The Album began in 2022 when Bellion met with the brothers in Nick's house to discuss the album's art direction. The producer assisted the band in realizing their goals and desired sound for the record. The first song they recorded was "Montana Sky", noted as "a spacious pop song with a breezy, filtered acoustic guitar and a thrumming baseline, which set the mood for the whole album" by Vanity Fair.

The lyrics of "Wings" refer to the feeling of flying when one is around someone exceptional. The song was described by Billboard as "lofty" and "soaring" for its production and lyrical content. According to American Songwriter, the track "Americana" pays homage to musicians like Jay-Z, Nelly, and the New Jersey native, Bruce Springsteen, with the lyrics showcasing the band's maturity through topics like fatherhood, family, marriage, and sex.

On the creative process for "Waffle House", the brothers explained that the song's content does not talk about the restaurant chain of the same name, but about "coming together with the people you love and making your dreams come true". During the band's early years as musicians, they frequently visited Waffle House to discuss career prospects, which is how the lyrics came to be. "Waffle House" was described by American Songwriter as an exposure of the yacht rock sound from Jay Ferguson's "Thunder Island".

During an interview with Dork, the brothers discussed the song "Summer Baby", revealing that it began as a Shania Twain-inspired country song, with lyrics about people not taking themselves too seriously and being proud of who they are. Joe added that their goal was to compose a song that would be played "at every family barbecue" and is reminiscent of "simpler times before the world became as complicated and nuanced as it is now".

Savannah Roberts of Capital FM described "Little Bird", the eleventh song on the album, as a "heartwarming" song with lyrical content referencing the band's daughters and fatherhood. The song was described by the singers and critics alike as one of their most personal work to date. For the magazine American Songwriter, "Little Bird" is a "powerful ballad" that discloses a narrative about "a father welcoming their daughter into the world and preparing to one day give her off", which links directly to the band's personal experience of being dads to young girls.

== Promotion ==
=== Broadway residency ===
To promote their then-upcoming album, the brothers announced a five-night Broadway residency at the Marquis Theatre from March 14 through March 18, 2023. The concept was that each night they would play the entirety of one of their catalog albums (starting with Jonas Brothers and finishing with their then-forthcoming release, The Album) while also performing their greatest hits. On March 18, 2023, the fifth and last night of their Broadway residency, the band performed most of the songs for the yet-unreleased album, along with some of their older hit songs, as well as some hit songs from the brothers' side musical projects (Nick as a solo artist and Joe's other band, DNCE).

=== World tour ===
To support the album, as well as their previous four albums, the band embarked on a world tour, Five Albums. One Night. The World Tour, where they performed all songs from Jonas Brothers (2007), A Little Bit Longer (2008), Lines, Vines and Trying Times (2009), Happiness Begins (2019) and The Album (2023) at every concert. The tour started on August 12, 2023, and concluded on October 16, 2024. Consisting of a total of 106 shows, the band performed in Asia, Oceania, Europe, North and South America during the tour.

=== Singles ===
The lead single of the album, "Wings", was released on February 24, 2023. It was accompanied by a music video, released on the same day, starring American actress Haley Lu Richardson. The second single, "Waffle House", was released on April 7, 2023, also being accompanied by a music video, directed by Anthony Mandler, released on April 28, 2023. Its music video was nominated for Best Choreography at the 2023 MTV Video Music Awards. The third single, "Summer Baby", was sent to adult contemporary radio on June 5, 2023. At their year-end list, Variety named the song as the 16th best song of 2023.

== Critical reception ==
Professional ratings
Aggregate scores
Source	Rating
Metacritic	66/100
Review scores
Source	Rating
AllMusic	3.5/5 stars
The Independent	3/5 stars
The Line of Best Fit	7/10
MusicOMH	3.5/5 stars
Rolling Stone	3.5/5 stars
Slant Magazine	1.5/5 stars

The Album received generally positive reviews from music critics, who described it as enjoyable and ageless. According to the review aggregator Metacritic, The Album received "generally favorable reviews" based on a weighted average score of 66 out of 100 from 6 critic scores.

Retropop called the album "timeless" thanks to its "plethora of influences from across the decades". The Independent's Helen Brown said of the album does not "push for edge or originality. But you'd have to be the barbecue grinch to deny its lovingly crafted, feel-good vibes".

Maura Johnston from Rolling Stone wrote that the band's sixth album "has summertime pop sparkle", calling it "a sparkling pop party full of romance and hooks", stating that the three brothers, along with the producers, showed off their songwriting and harmonic chops. And while commenting on the album as a body of work, she noted that its production shows how the band's ambition grows with the expansion of its legacy. For Billboard, Hannah Dailey stated: "The Album is saturated with bright synths and unabashed joy, as Kevin, Joe and Nick Jonas profess their love for their ladies, their kids and their carefree lifestyle, making for a final product that's poised for many hours of summer playback", while also naming the single "Wings" as the best song on the record.

The Hollywood Reporter named "Vacation Eyes", the eighth track on the album, as the third best song of 2023, citing "the kind of soft pop, yacht rock sound we want from them" as the brothers "entered their adult contemporary era". Variety named "Summer Baby", the third single off the album, as the 16th best song of 2023, with Steven J. Horowitz noting that Jonas Brothers and Bellion "wrote a love letter to yacht rock (and their wives) that snapshots what it means to be doe-eyed in love", and adding that the adult contemporary sound suited to them.

On a more negative review, Jackson Rickun from Slant Magazine wrote that the album "lacks in curiosity". He felt that the exploration of different genres didn't meet its full potential, expressing that the band failed to place "their own unique mark" on the songs.

== Commercial performance ==
In the United States, The Album debuted at number three on the Billboard 200 chart, earning 52,000 album-equivalent units (including 35,500 in pure album sales) in its first week. This became the Jonas Brothers' seventh top ten album on the chart. The album also accumulated a total of 20.5 million on-demand streams of the album's songs.

The album also marked the band's fourth number one on Billboard's Top Album Sales chart, according to Luminate. The trio previously led the chart with their albums Happiness Begins (2019), Lines, Vines and Trying Times (2009) and A Little Bit Longer (2008). Out of the 35,500 copies of the album that were sold in its first week, 29,000 were sold physically (20,000 on CD and 9,000 on vinyl) and 6,500 digitally.

Internationally, The Album debuted at number three on the UK Albums Chart, marking their second highest debut in the United Kingdom, after Happiness Begins debuted at number two back in 2019. It also charted at number eleven on the UK Cassette Albums (OCC).

== Accolades ==
The Album received a Silver Award at the 2024 Clio Awards for Album Launch/Artist Promotion Integrated Campaign. The Clios is an annual award program that recognizes innovation and creative excellence in advertising, design, and communication, as judged by an international panel of advertising professionals.

Awards and nominations for The Album
Organization	Year	Category	Award	Result	Ref.
Clio Awards	2024	Album Launch/Artist Promotion Integrated Campaign	Silver Award	Won	

== Track listing ==
The Album track listing
No.	Title	Writer(s)	Producer(s)	Length
1.	"Miracle"	Nicholas Jonas; Joseph Jonas; Kevin Jonas II; Jonathan Bellion; Jordan K. Johnson; Stefan Johnson; Alexander Izquierdo; Peter Nappi; Jason Cornet	Jon Bellion; The Monsters & Strangerz; Nappi; TenRoc	2:21
2.	"Montana Sky"	N. Jonas; J. Jonas; K. Jonas; Bellion; J. Johnson; S. Johnson; Nappi; Cornet; Gregory Hein; James Gutch	Bellion; The Monsters & Strangerz; Nappi; TenRoc	2:49
3.	"Wings"	N. Jonas; J. Jonas; K. Jonas; Bellion; J. Johnson; S. Johnson; Nappi; Cornet; Clyde Lawrence; Jordan Cohen	Bellion; The Monsters & Strangerz; Nappi; TenRoc; The Diner	1:58
4.	"Sail Away"	N. Jonas; J. Jonas; K. Jonas; Bellion; J. Johnson; S. Johnson; Nappi; Cornet; Michael Pollack; Calle Lehmann	Bellion; The Monsters & Strangerz; Nappi; TenRoc	3:12
5.	"Americana"	N. Jonas; J. Jonas; K. Jonas; Bellion; J. Johnson; S. Johnson; Izquierdo; Nappi; Cornet	Bellion; The Monsters & Strangerz; Nappi; TenRoc	2:00
6.	"Celebrate!"	N. Jonas; J. Jonas; K. Jonas; Bellion; J. Johnson; S. Johnson; Izquierdo; Nappi; Cornet; Pollack	Bellion; The Monsters & Strangerz; Nappi; TenRoc	2:06
7.	"Waffle House"	N. Jonas; J. Jonas; K. Jonas; Bellion; Nappi; Cornet; Daniel Tashian; Ido Zmishlany; Johnny Simpson; Hein	Bellion; Nappi; TenRoc; Tashian; Zmishlany	2:25
8.	"Vacation Eyes"	N. Jonas; J. Jonas; K. Jonas; Bellion; Nappi; Cornet	Bellion; Nappi; TenRoc; The Monsters & Strangerz^{[a]}	3:32
9.	"Summer in the Hamptons"	N. Jonas; J. Jonas; K. Jonas; Bellion; Nappi; Cornet; Hein; Felicia Ferraro; Elisha Noll	Bellion; Nappi; TenRoc	2:07
10.	"Summer Baby"	N. Jonas; J. Jonas; K. Jonas; Bellion; J. Johnson; S. Johnson; Nappi; Cornet; Pollack; Hein	Bellion; The Monsters & Strangerz; Nappi; TenRoc	2:41
11.	"Little Bird"	N. Jonas; J. Jonas; K. Jonas; Bellion; J. Johnson; S. Johnson; Nappi; Cornet; Pollack; Hein	Bellion; The Monsters & Strangerz; Nappi; TenRoc	3:09
12.	"Walls" (featuring Jon Bellion)	N. Jonas; J. Jonas; K. Jonas; Bellion; Nappi; Cornet; Simpson; Lawrence; Cohen; Ferraro; Andrea Rosario; Douglas Davis	Bellion; Nappi; TenRoc; The Diner; Simpson; Colin Brittain^{[a]}	4:26
Total length:				32:47

Target and Japanese bonus tracks
No.	Title	Writer(s)	Producer(s)	Length
13.	"Waffle House" (alternate version)	N. Jonas; J. Jonas; K. Jonas; Bellion; Nappi; Cornet; Zmishlany; Tashian; Simpson; Hein	Bellion; Nappi; TenRoc; Zmishlany; Tashian	2:41
14.	"Vacation Eyes" (alternate version)	N. Jonas; J. Jonas; K. Jonas; Bellion; Nappi; Cornet	Bellion; Nappi; TenRoc	4:12
Total length:				39:40

Note

- ^{^[a]} signifies an additional producer

== Personnel ==
Credits are adapted from the album's liner notes.

=== Jonas Brothers ===
- Nick Jonas – lead vocals, background vocals, bass guitar
- Joe Jonas – lead vocals, background vocals
- Kevin Jonas – guitar (all tracks), background vocals (10)

=== Additional musicians ===
- TenRoc – keyboards, programming (all tracks); bass guitar (1, 3–12), guitar (1, 3, 7, 9–12), background vocals (6, 9, 10, 12); string arrangement, strings (10); drums (12)
- Pete Nappi – guitar, keyboards, programming (all tracks); string arrangement (1, 8, 10), bass guitar (2, 4), mandolin (2); background vocals, strings (10)
- Jon Bellion – lead vocals (12), background vocals (1–4, 6, 8–11), keyboards (3, 4, 8, 9, 12), programming (4)
- Rebecca Perea – cello (1, 8)
- Marcus Brodsky – viola (1, 8)
- Jaycee Cardoso – violin (1, 8)
- Andrew Perea – violin (1, 8)
- Alex Sievren – strings (1)
- Alex Palazzo – guitar (2)
- The Monsters & Strangerz – programming (2–11)
  - Jordan Johnson – background vocals (10)
  - Stefan Johnson – background vocals (10)
- Clyde Lawrence – bass guitar (3, 11, 12), keyboards (3, 8), programming (3), background vocals (4), melodica (8); drums, guitar, programming (12)
- Jordan Cohen – keyboards (3), programming (3), background vocals (4, 12)
- Explicit – background vocals (6)
- Michael Pollack – background vocals (6, 10), keyboards (6, 11)
- Richie Cannata – saxophone (6)
- Mark Miller – trombone (6)
- Brad Mason – trumpet (6)
- Taylor Nohs – background vocals (9)
- Gregory "Aldae" Hein – background vocals (10)
- Sarah Cornet – background vocals (12)
- Colin Brittain – guitar (12)
- Johnny Simpson – keyboards, programming (12)

=== Technical ===
- Serban Ghenea – mixing
- Jon Bellion – vocal production
- Pete Nappi – vocal production
- Stefan Johnson – vocal production (3, 5, 6, 10, 11)
- John Arbuckle – engineering (1, 4, 6–8)
- Pete Nappi – engineering (2, 4–12), recording arrangement (1)
- Nathan Feler – engineering (2, 4–12)
- Stefan Johnson – engineering (10)
- Augusto Sanchez – immersive mix engineering (5)
- Joe Grasso – immersive mix engineering (5)
- John Hanes – immersive mix engineering (9)
- Bryce Bordone – mixing assistance
- Jeremy Klein – engineering assistance (2)
- Kyle Reith – additional engineering (9)

== Charts ==
=== Weekly charts ===
Weekly chart performance for The Album
Chart (2023)	Peak position
Australian Albums (ARIA)	20
Belgian Albums (Ultratop Flanders)	40
Belgian Albums (Ultratop Wallonia)	39
Canadian Albums (Billboard)	19
Dutch Albums (Album Top 100)	42
German Albums (Offizielle Top 100)	99
Irish Albums (IRMA)	55
New Zealand Albums (RMNZ)	20
Scottish Albums (Official Charts)	2
Spanish Albums (Promusicae)	56
Swiss Albums (Schweizer Hitparade)	88
Taiwanese Albums (G-Music)	5
UK Albums (Official Charts)	3
US Billboard 200	3

=== Year-end charts ===
Year-end chart performance for The Album
Chart (2023)	Position
UK Cassette Albums (OCC)	11
US Top Current Album Sales (Billboard)	92

== Release history ==
The Album release history
Region	Date	Format(s)	Edition(s)	Label	Ref.
Various	May 12, 2023	CD; digital download; streaming; vinyl LP; cassette	Standard	Republic	
United States	May 12, 2023	CD; vinyl LP	Target-exclusive	Republic	
United Kingdom	May 12, 2023	CD; cassette	UK Edition	Polydor	
Japan	May 12, 2023	CD	Japanese Edition	Tower	
