= Waffle House (song) =

2023 single by Jonas Brothers

Single by Jonas Brothers

from the album The Album
- Released: April 7, 2023
- Genre: Pop; pop rock
- Length: 2:25
- Label: Republic
- Songwriters: Joseph Jonas; Nicholas Jonas; Kevin Jonas II; Jonathan Bellion; Ido Zmishlany; Daniel Tashian; Peter Nappi; Jason Cornet; Johnny Simpson; Gregory Hein
- Producers: Bellion; Zmishlany; Tashian; Nappi; TenRoc

Jonas Brothers singles chronology
"Wings" (2023)	"Waffle House" (2023)	"Summer Baby" (2023)

Music video
- "Waffle House" on YouTube

"Waffle House" is a song by American group Jonas Brothers. It was released through Republic Records as the second single from their sixth studio album, The Album, on April 7, 2023. The three group members, Joe, Nick, and Kevin Jonas, wrote the song with producers Jon Bellion, Ido Zmishlany, Daniel Tashian, Pete Nappi, and TenRoc, alongside Johnny Simpson and Aldae.

== Background ==
The Jonas Brothers commented on the song and explained what it means to them in one of their promotional posts about the song on social media:

"Waffle House" was born from a simple but powerful idea: When you sit down with the people that matter most, anything is possible. This song isn't about a restaurant, it's about coming together with the people you love and making your dreams come true.

The song was conceived when the Jonas Brothers were working with producer Jon Bellion, who served as one of the main producers of The Album in the same way that producer Ryan Tedder did for the group's previous album, Happiness Begins (2019).

== Release and promotion ==
On January 27, 2023, the Jonas Brothers were interviewed by Variety, in which they revealed a few song titles from The Album, with "Waffle House" being one of them. After previewing various snippets of the song, they announced its release date and shared its cover art on March 24, 2023. The group performed the song alongside some other songs from The Album for the first time on their final show on Broadway at the Marquis Theater in Manhattan, New York on March 18, 2023.

== Composition and lyrics ==
"Waffle House" is a pop song that is named after the restaurant of the same name, a place that the Jonas Brothers used to eat at after finishing performing at shows, where they built many memories. The song "jitters with a funky groove and harmonies intended for a gospel choir" as Nick and Joe sing in the chorus: "No, don't get stressed, it's gon' get figured out / Oh, deep conversations at the Waffle House / Headstrong father and a determined mother / Oh, that's why some nights, we try to kill each other / But you know it's always love".

== Music video ==
The official music video for "Waffle House", directed by Anthony Mandler, was released during a YouTube live stream hosted by the Jonas Brothers on April 28, 2023. It premiered on their Vevo channel on YouTube at 3 p.m. EST the same day. The video was shot in London and features the three brothers performing dance moves along with numerous crowds whilst on their way to perform at the Royal Albert Hall, where they held a concert on April 14, 2023, to promote their new album.

== Live performances ==
The brothers performed the song on the fifth night of their Broadway residency, on March 18, 2023, as part of the setlist for The Album. On April 8, 2023, they performed the song on Saturday Night Live, along with the song "Walls", as musical guests.

== Accolades ==
Awards and nominations for "Waffle House"
Organization	Year	Category	Result	Ref.
MTV Video Music Awards	2023	Best Choreography	Nominated	
Nickelodeon Mexico Kids' Choice Awards	2023	Global Hit of the Year	Nominated	

== Credits and personnel ==
- Joe Jonas – vocals, songwriting
- Nick Jonas – vocals, songwriting
- Kevin Jonas – songwriting, guitar
- Jon Bellion – production, songwriting

== Charts ==
=== Weekly charts ===
Weekly chart performance for "Waffle House"
Chart (2023)	Peak position
Belgium (Ultratop 50 Flanders)	50
Belgium (Ultratop 50 Wallonia)	31
Canada Hot 100 (Billboard)	35
Canada AC (Billboard)	29
Canada CHR/Top 40 (Billboard)	13
Canada Hot AC (Billboard)	13
Croatia International Airplay (Top lista)	6
Iceland (Tónlistinn)	37
Ireland (IRMA)	21
Japan Hot Overseas (Billboard Japan)	6
Latvia Airplay (LAIPA)	7
New Zealand Hot Singles (RMNZ)	9
Slovakia Airplay (ČNS IFPI)	11
Suriname (Nationale Top 40)	18
UK Singles (Official Charts)	22
US Billboard Hot 100	57
US Adult Contemporary (Billboard)	18
US Adult Pop Airplay (Billboard)	10
US Pop Airplay (Billboard)	13
Venezuela Airplay (Record Report)	45

=== Year-end charts ===
Year-end chart performance for "Waffle House"
Chart (2023)	Position
Canada (Canadian Hot 100)	73
US Adult Contemporary (Billboard)	40
US Adult Top 40 (Billboard)	34
US Mainstream Top 40 (Billboard)	43

== Certifications ==
Certifications for "Waffle House"
Region	Certification	Certified units/sales
Canada (Music Canada)	Platinum	80,000^{‡}
New Zealand (RMNZ)	Gold	15,000^{‡}
United Kingdom (BPI)	Gold	400,000^{‡}
^{‡} Sales+streaming figures based on certification alone.

== Release history ==
Release dates and formats for "Waffle House"
Region	Date	Formats	Label	Ref.
Various	April 7, 2023	Digital download; streaming	Republic	
United States	April 10, 2023	Adult contemporary radio	Republic	
