= Jonas Brothers on Broadway =

2023 concert residency by Jonas Brothers

- Residency by Jonas Brothers
- Promotional poster for the event
- Location: Broadway, New York City, NY, U.S.
- Venue: Marquis Theatre
- Associated albums: Jonas Brothers; A Little Bit Longer; Lines, Vines and Trying Times; Happiness Begins; The Album
- Start date: March 14, 2023
- End date: March 18, 2023
- No. of shows: 5
- Attendance: 8,090
- Box office: $1,556,128.00
- Website: jonasbrothers.com

Jonas Brothers concert chronology
- Remember This Tour (2021–2022); Jonas Brothers on Broadway (2023); Five Albums. One Night. The World Tour (2023–2024)

Jonas Brothers on Broadway was the fourth concert residency by American pop rock band Jonas Brothers. performed at Marquis Theatre, a Broadway theater on the third floor of the New York Marriott Marquis hotel in the Theater District of Midtown Manhattan in New York City, United States. The residency opened on March 14, and ended on March 18, 2023, with each night being focused on one of the band's previous albums: Jonas Brothers (2007), A Little Bit Longer (2008), Lines, Vines and Trying Times (2009), Happiness Begins (2019) and The Album (2023).

== Background and concept ==
On February 24, 2023, the Jonas Brothers announced a five-night Broadway Residency at Marquis Theatre, in New York City. The residency was intended to celebrate their previous records, in anticipation for their then-upcoming sixth studio album, The Album, with shows nightly from March 14 through March 18, 2023. The concept was that each night they would play the entirety of one of their catalog albums (starting with Jonas Brothers and finishing with their then-forthcoming release, The Album) while also performing their greatest hits. On March 18, 2023, the fifth and last night of their Broadway residency, the band performed most of the songs for the yet-unreleased album, along with some of their older hit songs, as well as some hit songs from the brothers' side musical projects (Nick as a solo artist and Joe's other band, DNCE).

== Critical reception ==
Writing for Variety, Rebecca Rubin gave the first concert a positive review, in which she complimented the band's ability to keep the crowd on their feet throughout the entire show. Rubin also noted an improvement on their voices and that, even though the songs were written more than fifteen years ago, they still resonated with the audience.

== Commercial performance ==
The residency grossed a total of $1,556,128.00, from the entirety of the residency, with an average ticket price of $192.35. The shows counted with full capacity for all five nights, selling a total of 8,090 tickets, with 1,618 tickets being sold per night.

== Setlist ==
- The first night focused on the band's sophomore studio album, Jonas Brothers (2007).
- The second night focused on their third studio album, A Little Bit Longer (2008).
- On the third night, the Jonas Brothers performed the songs featured on their fourth studio album, Lines, Vines and Trying Times (2009).
- Night four was dedicated to the songs featured on the band's fifth studio album, and first after their reunion, Happiness Begins (2019).
- The fifth and last night was intended to promoted their then-recently released sixth studio album, titled The Album (2023).

== Shows ==
List of dates, associated album, attendance and revenue earned
Date	Associated album	Attendance	Revenue
March 14, 2023	Jonas Brothers	8,090 / 8,090; 1,618 (per night)	$1,556,128.00
March 15, 2023	A Little Bit Longer	8,090 / 8,090; 1,618 (per night)	$1,556,128.00
March 16, 2023	Lines, Vines and Trying Times	8,090 / 8,090; 1,618 (per night)	$1,556,128.00
March 17, 2023	Happiness Begins	8,090 / 8,090; 1,618 (per night)	$1,556,128.00
March 18, 2023	The Album	8,090 / 8,090; 1,618 (per night)	$1,556,128.00
Total		8,090 / 8,090 (100%)	$1,556,128.00
