= Soul of Shaolin =

2009 theatrical event

- Original poster
- Productions: 2008 Summer Olympics; Broadway January 2009

Soul of Shaolin was a theatrical event presented on Broadway by Nederlander Worldwide Entertainment to coincide with the celebration of the Lunar New Year in January 2009. The first production from the People’s Republic of China ever to appear on Broadway, its story is told through a display of Chinese martial arts, particularly Shaolin Kung Fu, handed down through generations in the Shaolin Monastery, a Chán Buddhist temple at Song Shan near Dengfeng in China.

== Plot ==
The primary focus is on Hui Guang, who as an infant was separated from his mother when she hid him, together with a broken piece of jade identifying his origin, during a period of civil conflict. Discovered by Na Luo, the baby is brought to the temple and raised by the monks who live there. His education includes instruction in the ways of Shaolin Kung Fu and the daily practice of Kung Fu skills. In later years, Hui Guang encounters his mother, now begging on the streets to support herself, being molested by a gang of men. In the ensuing struggle to rescue her, he drops the piece of jade, which she recognizes and pockets. Hoping to find her son, she sneaks into the forest on the temple grounds, where she is captured by Hui Guang. Following an interrogation, it becomes clear who she is. Her request to take her son with her is denied by the abbot, who declares if Hui Gang wants to leave the temple, he must fight his way out, according to the rules require. He does so, and mother and son finally are reunited.

== Production ==
Soul of Shaolin originally was presented at the 2008 Summer Olympics as part of the Beijing arts festival. Following three previews, the Broadway production officially opened at the Marquis Theatre on January 15, 2009, and ran for 21 performances and ended on the 31st. Featuring the Shaolin Temple Wushu Martial Artists, it was directed and choreographed by Liu Tongbiao and starred Yu Fei as Hui Guang as a young man, Zhang Zhigang as Na Luo, Wang Yazhi as Hui Guang's mother, and Bai Guojun as the abbot. The Broadway production has been nominated for the Tony Award for Best Special Theatrical Event and the Drama Desk Award for Unique Theatrical Experience.

== Critical reception ==
Charles Isherwood of The New York Times observed, "The three performers who play the main character, Hui Guang, impress with their contortionist feats and physical prowess . . . The splashy all-monks-on-deck numbers combine the pop of a Broadway dance routine with the testosteroney thrill of Hong Kong action movies. But Soul of Shaolin ultimately seems a pretty cheap enterprise. The sets are mostly painted flats, and the music . . . is recorded. Much of it is schlocky; for long stretches it sounds as if someone loaded up the world’s most bombastic movie soundtracks on an iPod and then pressed the shuffle button. The passages of more relaxed indigenous music come as a big relief. Unfortunately for the makers of Soul of Shaolin . . . the innumerable Cirque du Soleil shows have set a far higher standard in terms of stagecraft . . . I seriously doubt Soul of Shaolin represents the best of Chinese culture."

Sam Thielman of Variety called the production "a rushed, expertly trained assault that leaves you slightly confused afterward" and "a little weak on storytelling and variety." He added, "In the rare instances when the show communicates with utter clarity, it succeeds by speaking a universal language of one-upmanship and pratfalls . . . At the end of the day, however, you can get more precision from The Rockettes and you can get smarter Chinese action-comedy from a Stephen Chow movie. Soul of Shaolin isn't a failure, exactly, but it doesn't hit its target often enough to be a success, either."

Joe Dziemianowicz of the New York Daily News rated it two out of five stars and commented, "To borrow from A Chorus Line, Shaolin rates as follows - Martial arts: 10. Magic: 3 . . . Some kung-fu moves will make your head spin. When these performers launch into the air and whirl nearly horizontal to the ground, it's no Crouching Tiger, Hidden Dragon special effect. Unfortunately, cheesy sets and choppy staging choices undermine the highs. Lights and piped-in music don't seamlessly fade and bridge scenes. They slam off, like someone hitting the brakes to avoid a car crash. If you love martial arts and think Kill Bill is high art, you might not mind."

Frank Scheck of the New York Post gave the production three out of four stars and commented, "The impressive performers . . . provide a dazzling display of their skills, many involving staffs and sabers, but mostly their masterful control of their own bodies. The athleticism on display is truly amazing . . . Director Liu Tongbiao has choreographed the proceedings with a precision that would put the Rockettes to shame. It all culminates in a final raucous battle, and the most athletic curtain calls probably ever seen on a Broadway stage."

Michael Kuchwara of the Associated Press called it "a striking mixture of sentiment and strength" and commented, "It is the demanding physicality in the show that counts. That movement celebrates an intense kind of discipline that borders on the spiritual and proves to be surprisingly sturdy Broadway entertainment."
