= Good News (Ocean Park Standoff song) =

2016 song by Ocean Park Standoff

Single by Ocean Park Standoff
- Released: October 7, 2016
- Length: 3:09
- Label: Hollywood Records
- Songwriter(s): Samantha Ronson; Pete Nappi; Ethan Thompson

Ocean Park Standoff singles chronology
"Good News" (2016)	"Lost Boys (vs. Seeb)" (2018)

"Good News" is a song by American pop band Ocean Park Standoff.

== Charts ==
=== Weekly charts ===
Chart (2016–17)	Peak position
Canada Hot AC (Billboard)	43
US Adult Contemporary (Billboard)	22
US Adult Pop Airplay (Billboard)	13
US Hot Rock & Alternative Songs (Billboard)	12

=== Year-end charts ===
Chart (2017)	Position
US Adult Top 40 (Billboard)	45
US Hot Rock Songs (Billboard)	42
