= Summer Baby =

2023 single by Jonas Brothers

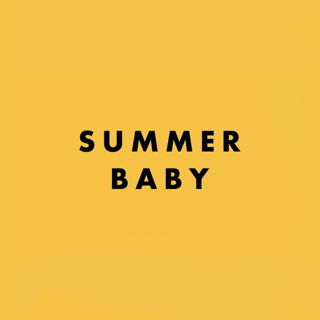
- Promotional graphic for the song. For its release to retailers, the song uses the same cover as the album. (Note: As seen on the digital releases for Apple Music and for Spotify.)

Single by Jonas Brothers

from the album The Album
- Released: June 5, 2023
- Genre: Pop · Country
- Length: 2:41
- Label: Republic
- Songwriters: Joseph Jonas; Nicholas Jonas; Kevin Jonas II; Jonathan Bellion; Jordan K. Johnson; Stefan Johnson; Peter Nappi; Jason Cornet; Michael Pollack; Gregory Hein
- Producers: Bellion; The Monsters & Strangerz; Nappi; TenRoc

Jonas Brothers singles chronology
"Waffle House" (2023)	"Summer Baby" (2023)	"Do It Like That" (2023)

Lyric video
- "Summer Baby" on YouTube

"Summer Baby" is a song by American group Jonas Brothers. It was sent to adult contemporary radio as the third single from their sixth studio album, The Album, on June 5, 2023. The three group members, Joe, Nick, and Kevin Jonas, wrote the songs with producers Jon Bellion, the Monsters & Strangerz (Jordan K. Johnson and Stefan Johnson), Pete Nappi, and TenRoc, alongside Michael Pollack and Aldae.

== Background and lyrics ==
Shortly after the release of The Album, the Jonas Brothers were interviewed by Dork, in which they revealed that "Summer Baby" began as a Shania Twain-inspired country song that is about people not taking themselves too seriously and being proud of who they are, in which Joe from the group added that they "wanted to write a song that gets played at every family barbecue" and also calls back to "simpler times before the world became as complicated and nuanced as it is now".

== Critical reception ==
Hannah Dailey of Billboard ranked "Summer Baby" as the second-best song on The Album, writing that it "pulls off a certain je ne sais quoi element that's essential for a truly great song of the summer contender", describing the song as "sunny, catchy, and fun, and easy to imagine in the background of thousands of summer-themed TikToks this year", predicting that its success would be close to that of the Jonas Brothers' comeback single, "Sucker", which was released in 2019.

Helen Brown of The Independent felt that looking at the names of the songs on the album "assures you this is upbeat fare", citing the song alongside "Miracle" and "Celebrate!" as examples that support the claim. Writing for MusicOMH, Ben Devlin opined that it "mines the timbres and contours of Earth, Wind & Fire's September".

The Line of Best Fit's David Cobbald gave it a mixed review, stating that "the track itself is perfectly fun and feel-good, but the lyrics don't really mean anything, and gets lost in the album (and in general) as just a 'nice' song". RetroPop Magazine agreed with the fact that it was a country song that was influenced by Shania Twain.

At their year-end list, Variety named "Summer Baby" as the 16th best song of 2023, with Steven J. Horowitz writing that "alongside songwriter Jon Bellion, who worked with them at length on the project, the trio wrote a love letter to yacht rock (and their wives) that snapshots what it means to be doe-eyed in love", and adding that the adult contemporary sound "feels right for JoBros".

Critics' rankings of Summer Baby
Publication	List	Rank	Ref.
Variety	The 65 Best Songs of 2023	16	

== Credits and personnel ==
- Joe Jonas – vocals, songwriting
- Nick Jonas – vocals, songwriting
- Kevin Jonas – songwriting, guitar
- Jon Bellion – production, songwriting

== Charts ==
Chart performance for "Summer Baby"
Chart (2023)	Peak position
Japan Hot Overseas (Billboard Japan)	11
New Zealand Hot Singles (RMNZ)	15
Suriname (Nationale Top 40)	3
US Pop Airplay (Billboard)	33

== Release history ==
Release history for "Summer Baby"
Region	Date	Format	Label	Ref.
United States	June 5, 2023	Adult contemporary radio	Republic Records	
United States	June 6, 2023	Contemporary hit radio	Republic Records	
