= Wings (Jonas Brothers song) =

2023 single by Jonas Brothers

Single by Jonas Brothers

from the album The Album
- Released: February 24, 2023
- Length: 1:58
- Label: Republic
- Songwriters: Nicholas Jonas; Joseph Jonas; Kevin Jonas II; Jonathan Bellion; Jordan K. Johnson; Stefan Johnson; Clyde Lawrence; Jordan Cohen; Peter Nappi; Jason Cornet
- Producers: Bellion; The Monsters & Strangerz; The Diner; Nappi; TenRoc

Jonas Brothers singles chronology
"Who's in Your Head" (2021)	"Wings" (2023)	"Waffle House" (2023)

Music video
- "Wings" on YouTube

"Wings" is a song by American group Jonas Brothers. It was released through Republic Records as the lead single from their sixth studio album, The Album, on February 24, 2023. The three group members, Nick, Joe, and Kevin Jonas, wrote the song with producers Jon Bellion, the Monsters & Strangerz (Jordan K. Johnson and Stefan Johnson), the Diner (Clyde Lawrence and Jordan Cohen), Pete Nappi, and TenRoc. It is their first release since their 2021 single, "Who's in Your Head", after not releasing any music in 2022.

== Background ==
On January 27, 2023, the Jonas Brothers were interviewed by Variety, in which they revealed a few song titles from The Album, with "Wings" being one of them. Two days later, Joe Jonas shared a snippet of the song while being in the company of his brothers Nick and Kevin, announcing that the group had received the final mix of it. After previewing various snippets of the song, they announced its release date and shared its cover art on February 9, 2023.

== Music video ==
The official music video for "Wings", directed by the Black Coffee Productions duo, Josh Rimmey & Zach Williams, and was released on the Jonas Brothers' Vevo channel on YouTube on February 24, 2023. The video features American actress Haley Lu Richardson performing "group choreography and some blindfolded kissing of cardboard cutouts" with her friends as they prepare to attend a Jonas Brothers event. When the girls are on their way, they suddenly meet the band at the elevator.

== Credits and personnel ==
- Nick Jonas – vocals, songwriting
- Joe Jonas – vocals, songwriting
- Kevin Jonas – songwriting, guitar
- Jon Bellion – production, songwriting

== Charts ==
Chart performance for "Wings"
Chart (2023)	Peak position
New Zealand Hot Singles (RMNZ)	21
UK Singles Downloads (OCC)	89
UK Singles Sales (OCC)	91
