= Hope For The Day =

American suicide-prevention nonprofit

- Abbreviation: HFTD
- Formation: 2011
- Founder: Jonny Boucher
- Type: Nonprofit organization
- Legal status: 501(c)(3) organization
- Purpose: Suicide prevention and mental health education
- Headquarters: Chicago, Illinois, United States
- Executive director: Benjamin Kohn
- Website: www.hftd.org

Hope For The Day (HFTD) is a Chicago-based non-profit organization focusing on proactive suicide prevention by providing outreach and mental health education to empower the conversation. The organization uses concerts, workshops, and events, and innovative partnerships to provide outreach and education.

== History ==
Hope For The Day was founded in 2011 by Jonny Boucher after losing sixteen people to suicide, including his boss and mentor, Mike Scanland, in 2010. Boucher began working in the music industry as a concert promoter and initially promoted HFTD by distributing fliers with information about mental-health resources at music venues, churches, libraries, and schools. He later gave short talks from the stage, and the organization expanded its outreach and training to music festivals, schools, libraries, and workplaces.

In 2021 a decade after founding the organization, HFTD executives suspended and then fired Boucher over alleged "identity disrespect" and "gender bias" accusations raised in February.

== Approach ==
Hope For The Day's approach to suicide prevention is motivated by the view that suicide-prevention efforts in the United States and elsewhere lack a unified framework for guiding action. Its action plan has three complementary components:

1. Outreach: Starting the Conversation. Starting the Conversation through Outreach: PEERvention starts with a conversation by meeting people where they're at, not where we expect them to be, and raising the visibility of community mental health resources.
2. Education: Advancing the Conversation. This involves ensuring that individuals, institutions, and communities are educated on proper mental health care, and how to respond to mental health challenges.
3. Take Action: Empowering the Conversation. Empowers community members to be organizers who build opportunities and promote mental health in their own networks.

== Sip of Hope ==
Hope For The Day began collaborating with Chicago roaster Dark Matter Coffee in 2013 on a coffee blend called Sip of Hope. Boucher began planning a physical cafe in 2016, and the Sip of Hope Coffee Bar opened in Logan Square on May 3, 2018.

Hope For The Day operated the cafe, while Dark Matter supplied its coffee. Proceeds supported the nonprofit, and the cafe provided mental-health resource materials; its staff were certified in Mental Health First Aid. The organization ended the Dark Matter arrangement and began operating independently in October 2020. A second Sip of Hope cafe opened at the University of Chicago Medical Center's Center for Care and Discovery in Hyde Park in 2024.

== Partnerships ==
=== Dark Matter Coffee ===
Hope For The Day partnered with Chicago's Dark Matter Coffee to launch Sip of Hope as a social-enterprise coffee shop. The cafe opened in May 2018.

=== Mastodon ===
In 2017, the friendship between Mastodon drummer and vocalist Brann Dailor and Boucher resulted in the band performing a benefit concert at Metro in honor of Dailor's sister, Skye, and in support of HFTD's suicide-prevention programming. Much of the set drew from the band's 2009 album Crack the Skye, which pays homage to Skye, who died by suicide at age 14.

=== Beartooth ===
On December 13, 2016, American post-hardcore band Beartooth created a charity auction in support of HFTD.

=== Neck Deep ===
Ben Barlow, lead vocalist of Welsh pop-punk band Neck Deep, was interviewed by Boucher at the Vans Warped Tour in 2017. Barlow discussed the band sharing similar goals with HFTD.

=== Vans Warped Tour ===
Boucher toured with the Vans Warped Tour. HFTD operated a tent at each venue where it distributed resources and provided a place for people seeking information, while Boucher promoted the organization's message from the stage.

=== Chicago Digital ===
Chicago Digital, a digital-marketing and web-design company, worked with Hope For The Day to create a website and a resource-finding application.

=== Havas Chicago ===
In September 2018, advertising company Havas Chicago created a public-art display with Hope For The Day. The installation featured 121 mannequins wearing shirts bearing the slogan "It's OK Not To Be OK", representing the average number of suicide deaths then reported each day in the United States. A mannequin was removed for every $121 donated to the #121ToNone fundraiser and at specified levels of social-media participation.

=== Nickel A Day Films ===
HFTD worked with AnnMarie Parker of Nickel A Day Films to create I'm Fine, a short film about a group of friends coping after a teenager dies by suicide. The film is set in Naperville and addresses pressures involving families, schools, and peers.

=== Hope Foods ===
In May 2020, HFTD partnered with hummus and dip company Hope Foods on a mental-health-awareness fundraising campaign.

== Education ==
=== PEERvention Workshops ===
Starting in 2016, HFTD held free monthly health seminars at the Logan Square branch of the Chicago Public Library to educate the public about mental health and suicide prevention. The workshop supplies tools intended to support proactive mental-health care by individuals and communities in Chicago.
