= As I Am (song) =

2021 song by Justin Bieber featuring Khalid

Song by Justin Bieber featuring Khalid

from the album Justice
- Released: March 19, 2021
- Genre: Pop
- Length: 2:54
- Label: Def Jam
- Songwriters: Justin Bieber; Khalid Robinson; Jordan K. Johnson; Stefan Johnson; Oliver Peterhof; Josh Gudwin; Ido Zmishlany; Scott Harris; Gregory Hein
- Producers: The Monsters & Strangerz; German; Josh Gudwin

"As I Am" is a song by Canadian singer Justin Bieber featuring American singer-songwriter Khalid. It was released through Def Jam Recordings on March 19, 2021, as the third track from Bieber's sixth studio album, Justice. The song was written alongside Scott Harris, Aldae, producers The Monsters & Strangerz, German (of TM&S), & Josh Gudwin, and co-producer Ido Zmishlany.

== Background and composition ==
"As I Am" is a pop ballad set in the key of B major and has a moderate tempo of 100 beats per minute. The song marks the first collaboration between Justin Bieber and Khalid. The "soulful and hopeful" song serves as "a sweet reminder of being grateful for the people who love you even when you are not perfect". The "high-pitched synth and intense percussion" develop into the "upbeat, catchy chorus".

On March 19, 2021, in an interview with Vogue, Bieber spoke on the nature of the song and revealed that it was about the promises that he made to his wife Hailey Baldwin:

I love this song because it has a really hopeful message. A lot of us, including me at times, have felt unworthy of love and so [the hook] is saying, 'Take me as I am and I'll do the best that I can.' It's that commitment that I personally made to my wife. I'm here through thick and thin—this is me, take it or leave it.

== Critical reception ==
Billboard's Jason Lipshutz ranked "As I Am" as the twelfth-best song on Justice, opining that the pairing of Bieber and Khalid "plays out just as fans would have hoped" and that it "should be the first of several team-ups between the two". Craig Jenkins from Vulture wrote that the collaboration "fools you into thinking it's another muted ballad before knocking you over the head with a massive drop". Jennifer McClellan of USA Today thought that Khalid's vocals on the track were a "genius addition". Similarly, Chris Willman of Variety believed Khalid was one of several guest artists on Justice "who actually feel like they complement Bieber somehow". By contrast, Ali Shutler of The Daily Telegraph turned down Khalid's guest appearance on the song as unexciting. Uproxx's Bianca Gracie felt that the song was "a formulaic recreation of Believe's poppier moments".

== Credits and personnel ==
Credits adapted from Tidal.

- Justin Bieber – lead vocals, songwriting
- Khalid – featured vocals, songwriting
- The Monsters & Strangerz – production, songwriting, drums, programming
  - Jordan K. Johnson – production, songwriting, drums, programming
  - Stefan Johnson – production, vocal production, songwriting, drums, programming
- German – production, songwriting, bass, programming
- Josh Gudwin – production, songwriting, mixing, recording, vocal engineering, studio personnel
- Ido Zmishlany – co-production, songwriting, piano
- Scott Harris – songwriting
- Aldae – songwriting, background vocals
- Pierre-Luc Rioux – guitar
- Colin Leonard – mastering
- Denis Kosiak – recording
- Heidi Wang – recording, assistant mixing
- James Keeley – assistant recording

== Charts ==
Chart performance for "As I Am"
| Chart (2021) | Peak position |
|---|---|
| Australia (ARIA) | 23 |
| Austria (Ö3 Austria Top 40) | 34 |
| Canada Hot 100 (Billboard) | 9 |
| Czech Republic Singles Digital (ČNS IFPI) | 34 |
| Denmark (Tracklisten) | 5 |
| France (SNEP) | 166 |
| Global 200 (Billboard) | 13 |
| Greece (IFPI) | 48 |
| Iceland (Tónlistinn) | 30 |
| Ireland (IRMA) | 14 |
| Japan Hot Overseas (Billboard) | 16 |
| Lithuania (AGATA) | 32 |
| Malaysia (RIM) | 20 |
| Netherlands (Single Top 100) | 29 |
| New Zealand (Recorded Music NZ) | 32 |
| Norway (VG-lista) | 18 |
| Portugal (AFP) | 36 |
| Singapore (RIAS) | 20 |
| Slovakia Singles Digital (ČNS IFPI) | 12 |
| Sweden (Sverigetopplistan) | 29 |
| UK Singles (OCC) | 24 |
| US Billboard Hot 100 | 43 |

== Certifications ==
Certifications for "As I Am"
| Region | Certification | Certified units/sales |
|---|---|---|
| Australia (ARIA) | Gold | 35,000^{‡} |
| Brazil (Pro-Música Brasil) | Platinum | 40,000^{‡} |
| Denmark (IFPI Danmark) | Gold | 45,000^{‡} |
| New Zealand (RMNZ) | Gold | 15,000^{‡} |
| Norway (IFPI Norway) | Gold | 30,000^{‡} |
| United States (RIAA) | Gold | 500,000^{‡} |
^{‡} Sales+streaming figures based on certification alone.
