= Taylor James =

DJ Tay James
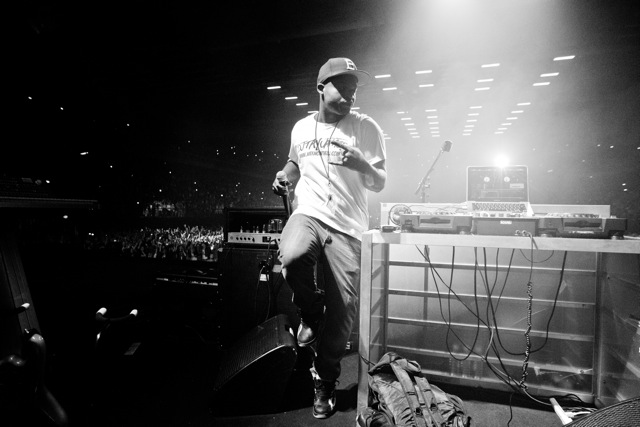
- Performing in Denmark in 2012, photo by Mike Lerner

Background information
- Birth name: Taylor Austin James
- Born: May 15, 1987 (age 38)
- Origin: Baltimore, Maryland
- Genres: Club music, pop, electronic dance music, hip hop
- Occupations: DJ, MC
- Years active: 2005–present
- Labels: Unruly Records
- Website: weknowthedj.com

Taylor Austin James (born May 15, 1987), better known as DJ Tay James, is an American DJ and MC. He was signed to Unruly Records in 2005, and after several years playing clubs in the Washington, D.C., and Baltimore area began touring as Justin Bieber's DJ and MC in 2009. He has released a number of mixtapes, and as of 2012 is a radio DJ on WPGC-FM. DJ Tay James was named HBCU Top 30 Under 30, in July 2014

== Early life ==
Taylor Austin James was born on May 15, 1987 in Baltimore, Maryland. He grew up in Columbia, Maryland, later moving to Bel Air, Harford County, Maryland. At twelve years old he saw DJ Scribble on MTV, and his father bought him a pair of turntables for Christmas. After being taught to use them by his brother he started to DJ parties for his sister (Morgan James) and friends. At age 15 he began interning at Unruly Records, a club music label based in Baltimore.

At age 16 he was paid $300 for DJing a birthday party, and immediately quit his job at Burger King to focus on music. After graduating Calvert Hall College High School he was signed by Unruly Records and began spinning at CD listening parties and clubs.

== Music career ==
=== Mixtapes, radio ===
While at Unruly Records James studied under local DJs such as K-Swift and Claxton, and was mentored by DJ Alizay. He also became associated with DTLR. He worked for three years at Unruly before leaving to attend Hampton University in Virginia.

In college, he studied business management and continued mixing at clubs and parties. On weekends, he drove 130 miles each way to DJ at Love, a large club in Washington, D.C., that routinely held 8,000 people. He played at Love for three years, where he notably DJed birthday parties for Chris Brown and Bow Wow, and an afterparty for Beyoncé. He also spun at other Washington clubs including Ibiza and Park, and was a guest DJ for Barack Obama's inauguration. He graduated from Hampton University with a BS in business management in 2009.

As of 2012 he has a live broadcast on D.C. radio station WPGC-FM on Friday nights. He continues to release mixtapes on a regular basis, and as of 2012 he's released over 77, which have sold over 150,000 hard copies in the mid-Atlantic region.

=== Justin Bieber, touring ===
While getting a haircut in July 2009 James got a call from former Hampton classmate DJ Boogie, who was working in Atlanta with R&B artist Sammie. Justin Bieber's management (also based in Atlanta) had asked Boogie for a DJ recommendation, and they interviewed James and flew him to Oklahoma to meet and tour with Bieber.

At the time James was hired, Bieber had only performed in public twice. James played Bieber's third performance without a tryout. They played a water park in Tulsa, Oklahoma, which they headlined after Sean Kingston dropped out. At the time, the act only had James, Bieber, and two dancers. James continued to open concerts for the act and tour while still flying to D.C. for various gigs. He was a fixture both in the "My World Tour", where he opened all shows for the South American leg. He was also DJ and MC for Bieber's "Believe Tour."

James contributed scratching to the track "Right Here" on the Justin Bieber album Believe, which peaked at #1 on the US Billboard 200. He and Bieber also freestyled on the 2010 joke track "Omaha Mall," a webisode of We Know the DJ, which now has five seasons.

== Film & TV placements ==
=== Movie features ===
- Justin Bieber: Never Say Never movie (2011)

=== Television appearances ===
- The Tonight Show with Jay Leno (2011, 2012)
- The Ellen DeGeneres Show (2011, 2012)
- The Oprah Winfrey Show (2011)
- The View (2011, 2012)
- The Today Show (2011, 2012)
- All Around the World NBC special (2012)
- Dick Clark's New Year's Eve show (2011)
- MTV Video Music Awards (2011)
- Teen Choice Awards (2011)
- Disney Christmas Parade (2011)
- The David Letterman Show (2011, 2012)
