= Marquis Theatre =

Broadway theater in Manhattan, New York

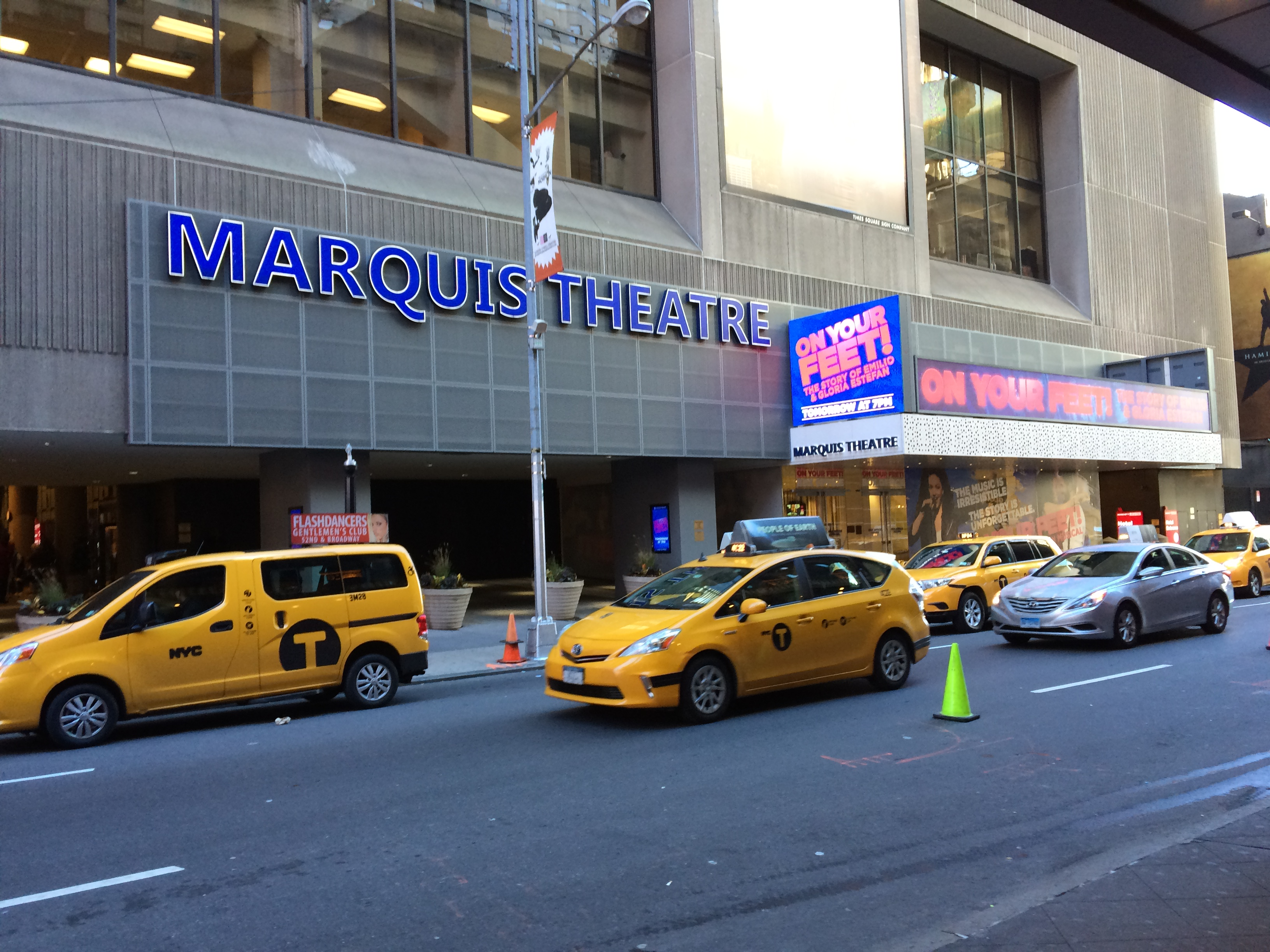
- The theatre marquee, box office and entrance on the 46th Street side of the New York Marriott Marquis hotel
- Interactive map of Marquis Theatre
- Address: 210 West 46th Street; Manhattan, New York; United States
- Coordinates: 40°45′32″N 73°59′11″W
- Owner: Vornado Realty Trust (majority)
- Operator: Nederlander Organization
- Capacity: 1,612 (Note: This capacity is approximate and may vary depending on the show.)
- Type: Broadway
- Production: Stranger Things: The First Shadow

Construction
- Opened: July 9, 1986 (40 years ago)
- Years active: 1986–present
- Architect: John C. Portman Jr.

Website
- broadwaydirect.com/venue/marquis-theatre

The Marquis Theatre is a Broadway theater on the third floor of the New York Marriott Marquis hotel in the Theater District of Midtown Manhattan in New York City, New York, U.S. Opened in 1986, it is operated by the Nederlander Organization. There are about 1,612 seats in the auditorium, spread across an orchestra level and a balcony.

The Marquis was designed by John C. Portman Jr., who designed the Marriott Marquis and included the theater to increase the size of the hotel. The theater's main entrance and box office are at 210 West 46th Street. The box office is at ground level, and there are escalators leading from the ground floor to the auditorium. Due to a lack of space, the wings on each side of the proscenium arch are smaller than mandated by city building codes. The theater also has no freight elevator, no dedicated restroom facilities, and small hallways.

A theater was proposed on the site in 1973 as part of a hotel (later the Marriott Marquis), the completion of which was delayed until 1985. The hotel had controversially replaced several existing theaters, and the design features of the new Marquis Theatre were highly criticized, even by the hotel's supporters. The theater opened in July 1986 with concerts by Shirley Bassey, followed by the long-running Me and My Girl. The Marquis then hosted a series of short-lived productions from the 1990s through the 2010s.

== Design ==
The Marquis Theatre was designed by John C. Portman Jr. and is on the third story of the New York Marriott Marquis hotel. The site occupies the west side of Broadway, between 45th and 46th Streets, in the Theater District of Midtown Manhattan in New York City, New York, U.S. It is the only Broadway theater that is entirely within a hotel. The theater was included as part of a deal between Portman and the New York City Board of Estimate to increase the size of the hotel, which was completed in 1985. The main entrance is at 210 West 46th Street while the stage door is hidden behind a column on 45th Street. The hotel's third through seventh stories also contain theater offices.

The ground-level box office is decorated with black marble and brass railings. The box office is so small that, as designed, theater visitors had to exit the building to take an escalator up to the theater. The up escalator ends at a narrow hallway that leads to the auditorium. The down escalator from the auditorium leads to a narrow area at ground level. Due to the lack of space in the theater, there is no dedicated theater lobby, and restrooms are placed in the hotel's common area.

There are 1,612 seats in the auditorium proper, spread across an orchestra level and a balcony level. The auditorium was originally designed with a rose-and-burgundy color scheme, as well as light-colored wood and white plaster. There are wood-paneled areas above the balcony, which conceal a large portion of the lighting fixtures. As designed, Portman intended for all seats to be no farther than 80 ft (24 m) from the stage. To make the auditorium seem cozier than similarly new theaters, such as the Minskoff Theatre and Uris Theatre, the Marquis's designers placed boxes on either side of the stage.

The proscenium arch is 40 feet (12 m) wide. Speakers are hidden behind cloth coverings on either side of the proscenium. The stage, which is underneath the proscenium, consists of oak panels measuring 3 by 6 feet (0.91 by 1.83 m); trap doors can be placed under any of the panels. Under New York City building guidelines, the wings are typically supposed to be as wide as the proscenium arch; however, there was not enough space in the hotel to accommodate 40-foot-wide wings. Instead, the wings are 20 feet (6.1 m) in width, a modification approved by the New York City Planning Commission. In addition, the fly space is about 58 feet (18 m) above the stage, shorter than in comparable theaters. There is no freight elevator.

== History ==
=== Construction ===
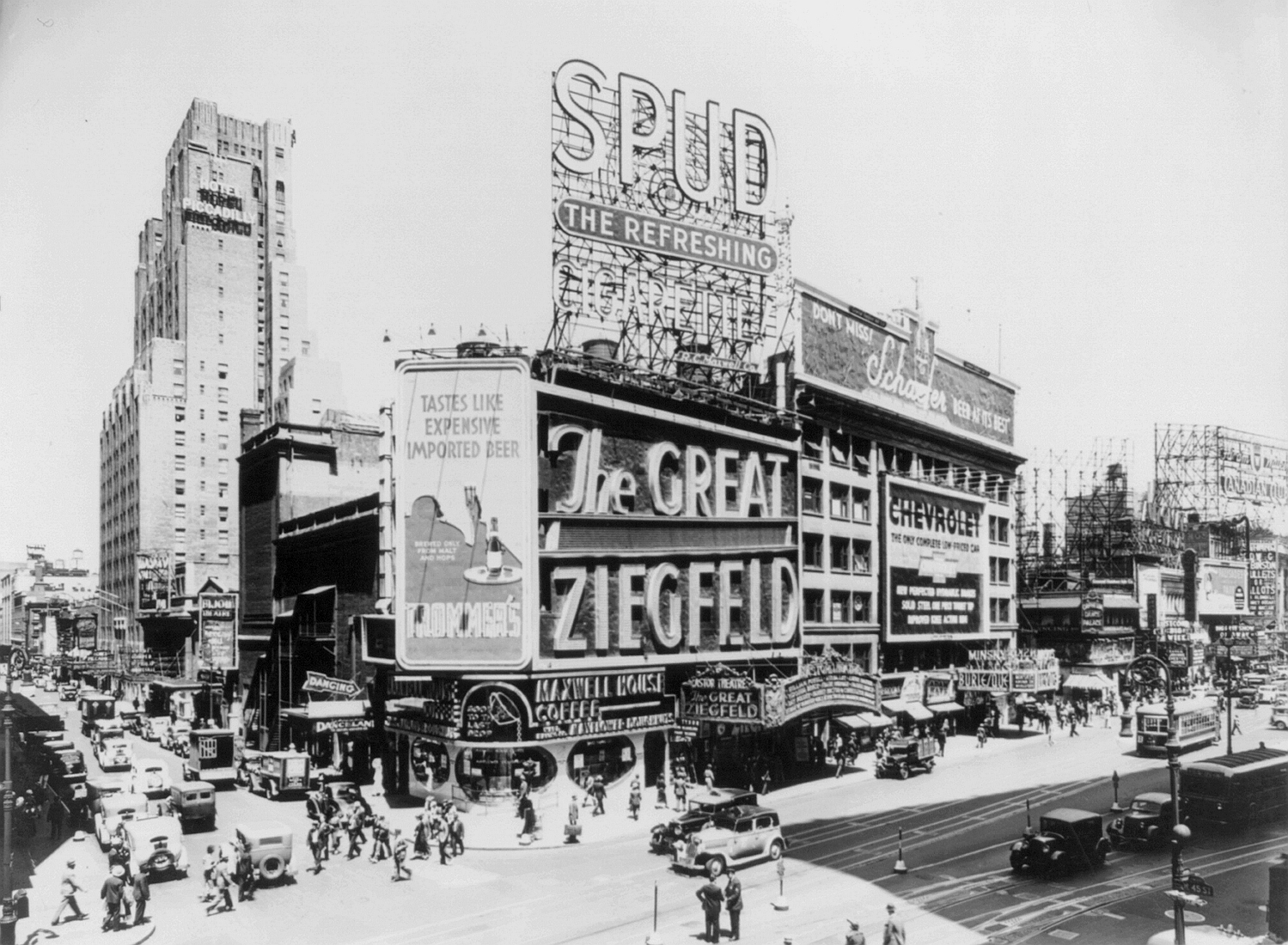
The site of the New York Marriott Marquis was occupied by several theaters including the Astor (pictured).

A theater was first proposed in 1973 as part of the Portman Hotel, which subsequently became the Marriott Marquis. The hotel plans were canceled in 1975 due to a lack of funding, though the plans were revived in 1978. The plans entailed the demolition of five theaters: the original Helen Hayes, the Morosco, the Bijou, and remnants of the Astor and the Gaiety. After several years of delays, the old theaters were demolished in 1982, despite major opposition to the demolition of the theaters and to the hotel itself. In mid-1983, the Marriott chain began negotiating with potential theater operators. The Times Square Hotel Company, which was developing the Marriott Marquis, wanted any potential operator to pay $3.6 million a year. Marriott received bids from ten organizations, which were then reduced to four finalists before Marriott offered the Shubert Organization the right to operate the theater. Shubert chairman Gerald Schoenfeld had expressed doubts, saying: "I'm not sure that theater is a plum. It depends on the economics."

The Nederlander Organization won the rights to operate the hotel's theater in November 1984 and signed a lease the following year. The theater was planned to have its own entrance on Broadway, while the hotel's entrances would be to the sides, on 45th and 46th Streets. The plans for the theater were released in January 1985, the design features were highly criticized, especially by the Shuberts, who had supported the hotel. Among the complaints were that the theater was hard to access, being on the third floor; the gridiron on the theater's ceiling was too low; and the theater restrooms were in the hotel lobby, which was on the eighth floor. The Times Square Hotel Company proposed in April 1985 that the theater wings beside the proscenium be enlarged, since the wings would only be 20 feet 10 inches (6.35 m) wide. The theater ultimately cost $30 million and took a year to construct.

=== Operation ===
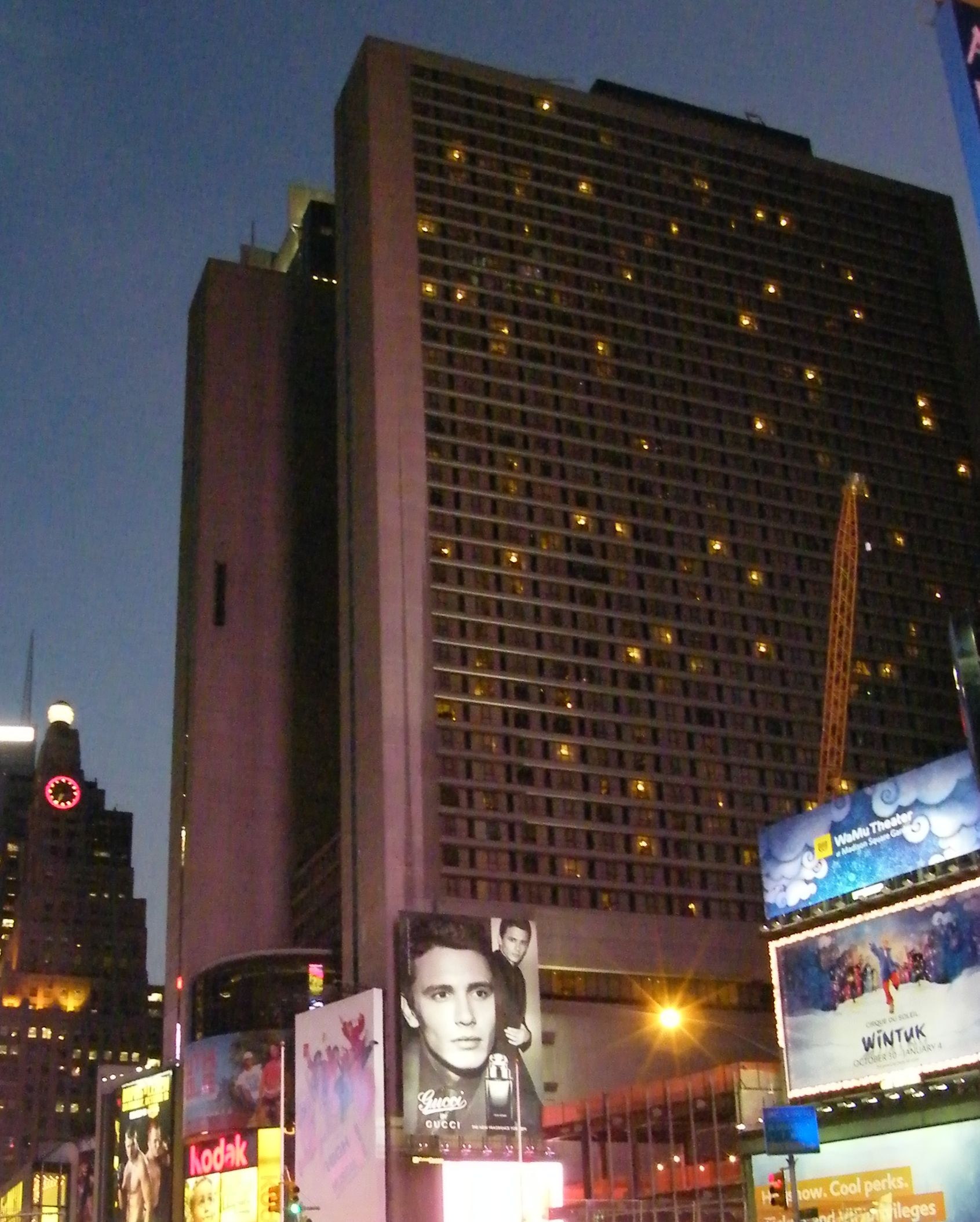
The Marriott Marquis, where the theater is housed

The Marquis opened July 9, 1986, with a series of concerts by Shirley Bassey. The first musical to play the Marquis was Me and My Girl, which opened the following month. Architectural critic Herbert Muschamp wrote that the overall design "is not a theater environment but that of a hotel, of homogenized 'hospitality', better suited to a convention than a chorus line." Some Broadway performers also boycotted the Marquis because of the controversy over the construction of the Marriott Marquis hotel.

==== 1980s and 1990s ====
The theater advertised its productions through the hotel's in-house television channel. Hotel guests could buy tickets to a production and have these ticket fees added to their regular hotel bills. As designed, the stage area did not have its own heating system, and cast members could see their own breath during particularly cold days. Additionally, the hotel's sewer system had an exterior vent that was near the auditorium's air intake, causing widespread reports of nausea. The sewer system would back up into ten drainpipes in the theater's floor. The Actors' Equity Association threatened to withdraw its actors from the theater, and the Nederlanders agreed the plumbing and ventilation systems were problematic. This prompted Marriott to spend $500,000 on a dedicated heating, ventilation, and plumbing system for the Marquis Theatre in January 1988.

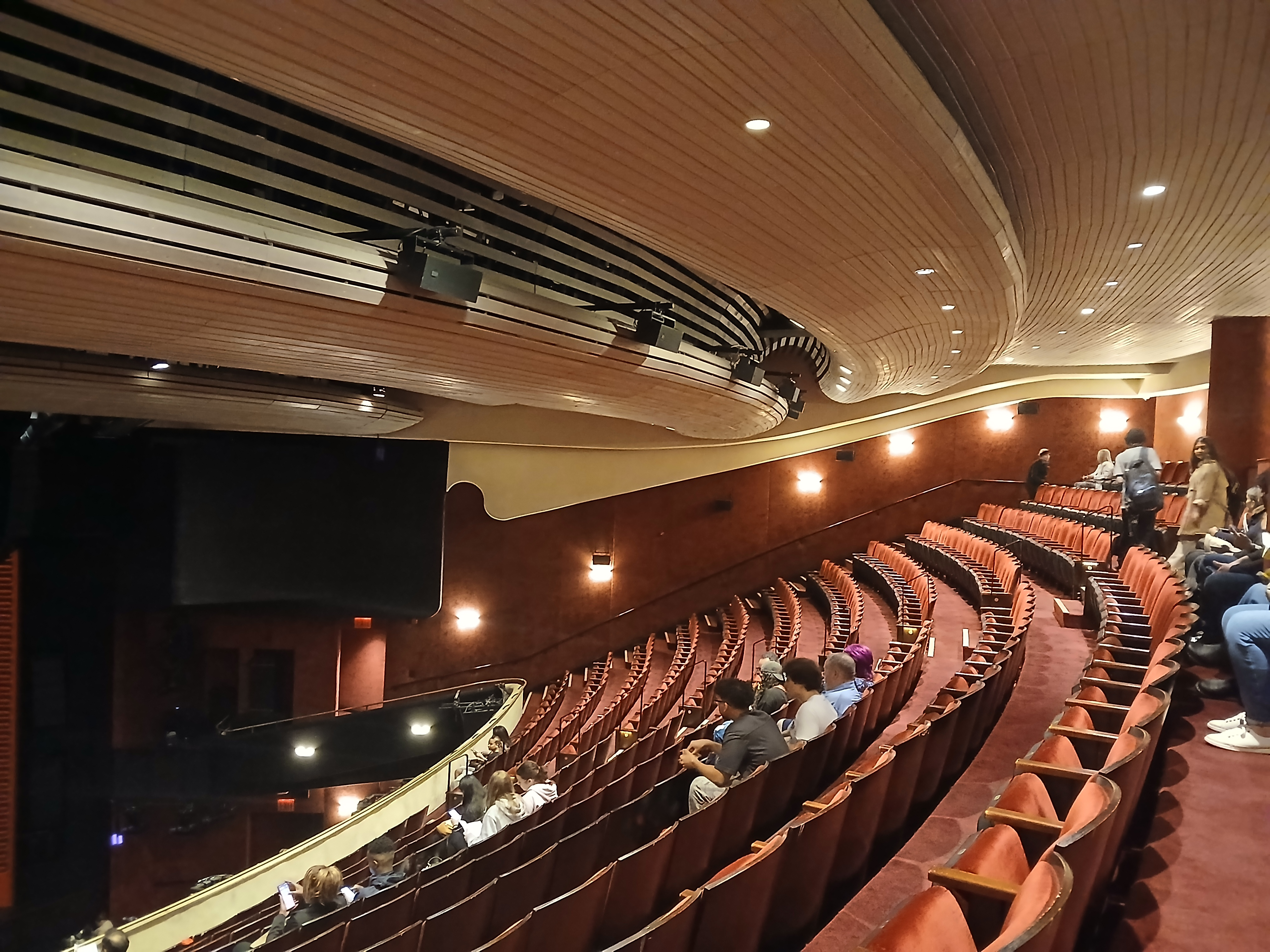
Right hand wall of the auditorium

Me and My Girl was particularly popular, despite a dearth of productions in the Nederlanders' other theaters. The production closed at the end of 1989 to make way for the Broadway run of the musical Annie 2, which itself was canceled in early 1990. The Marquis next hosted Shogun: The Musical in November 1990. The production starred Philip Casnoff, who was hospitalized after being hit by debris during a preview, and Shogun ultimately flopped. The Marquis also hosted a revival of the production Gypsy, which was relatively successful. Afterward, the Marquis hosted a series of flops, such as Nick & Nora in 1991.

During much of the 1990s, the theater hosted several short-lived productions. These included Man of La Mancha in 1992, The Goodbye Girl in 1993, and Damn Yankees in 1994. Afterward, Victor/Victoria opened in 1995 and ran for almost two years, with 734 performances. During the run of Victor/Victoria, producer John Scher had tried to provide a "hospitality suite" in the adjacent hotel, but it was unsuccessful. Other flops followed, including The Capeman in 1998, which closed after only two months and was replaced by Forever Tango. The theater also hosted a revival of Peter Pan in 1998 and Annie Get Your Gun in 1999.

==== 2000s to present ====
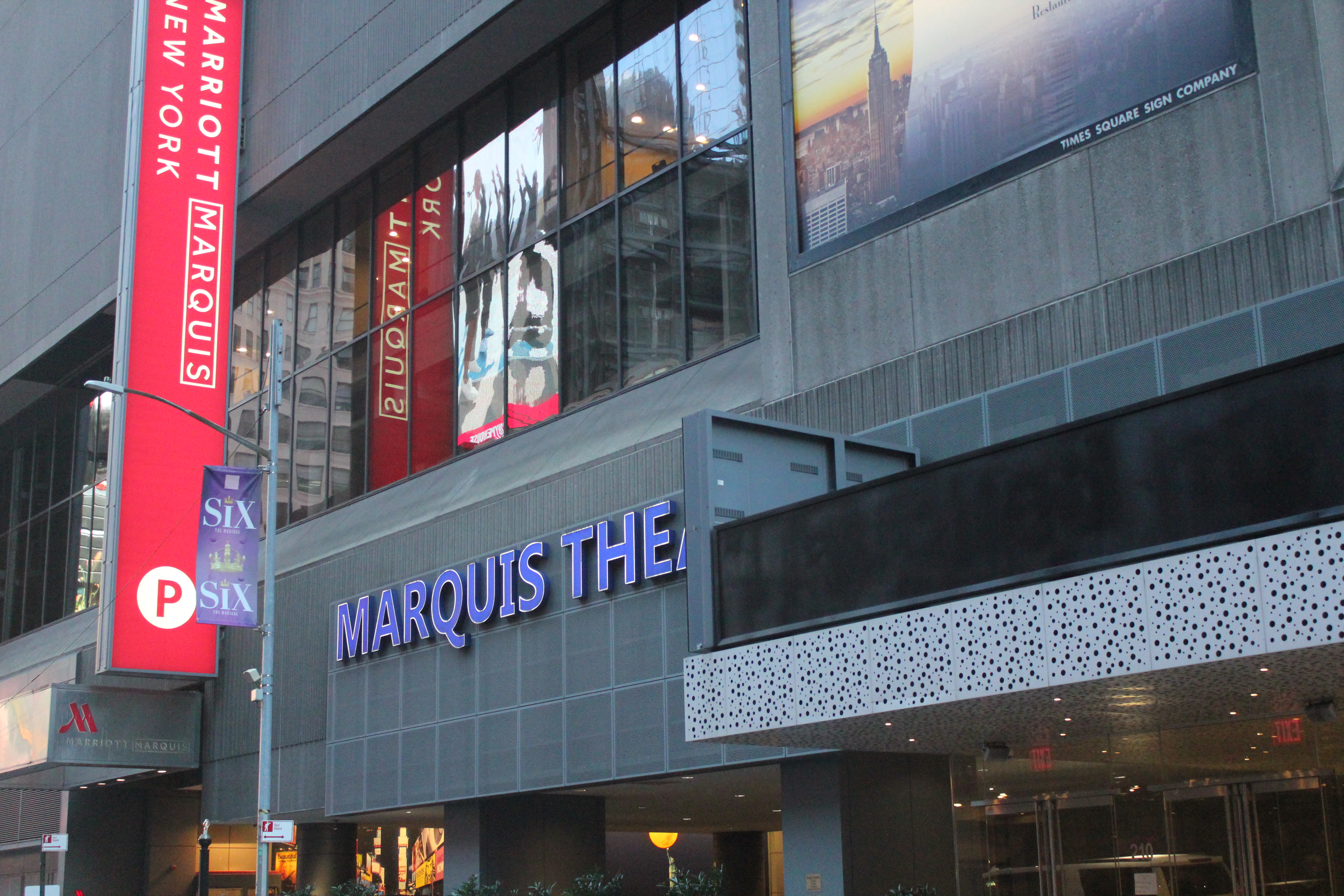
Theater entrance on 46th Street

For one week in 2001, the Marquis hosted A Christmas Carol. Through the early 2000s, the Marquis had mixed success with its productions. While it played host to the critically acclaimed Thoroughly Modern Millie from 2002 to 2004, its following two shows, La Cage aux Folles in 2004 and The Woman in White in 2005, had abbreviated runs due to poor box office returns. The Marquis's other events included a choir performance in October 2001 to celebrate the release of the Windows XP operating system, as well as events to benefit charities. The theater also hosted the production of The Drowsy Chaperone in 2006. Chaperone was slightly modified for its run at the Marquis, wherein the Man In Chair remarks that the production within the show originally played the Morosco Theatre, but "it was torn down in 1982, and replaced with an enormous hotel. Unforgivable." The Marquis then hosted Cry-Baby and a limited run of Irving Berlin's White Christmas during 2008. The martial arts show Soul of Shaolin played at the Marquis in 2009, making it the first Chinese production to play on Broadway. This was followed the same year by 9 to 5 and another limited engagement of White Christmas.

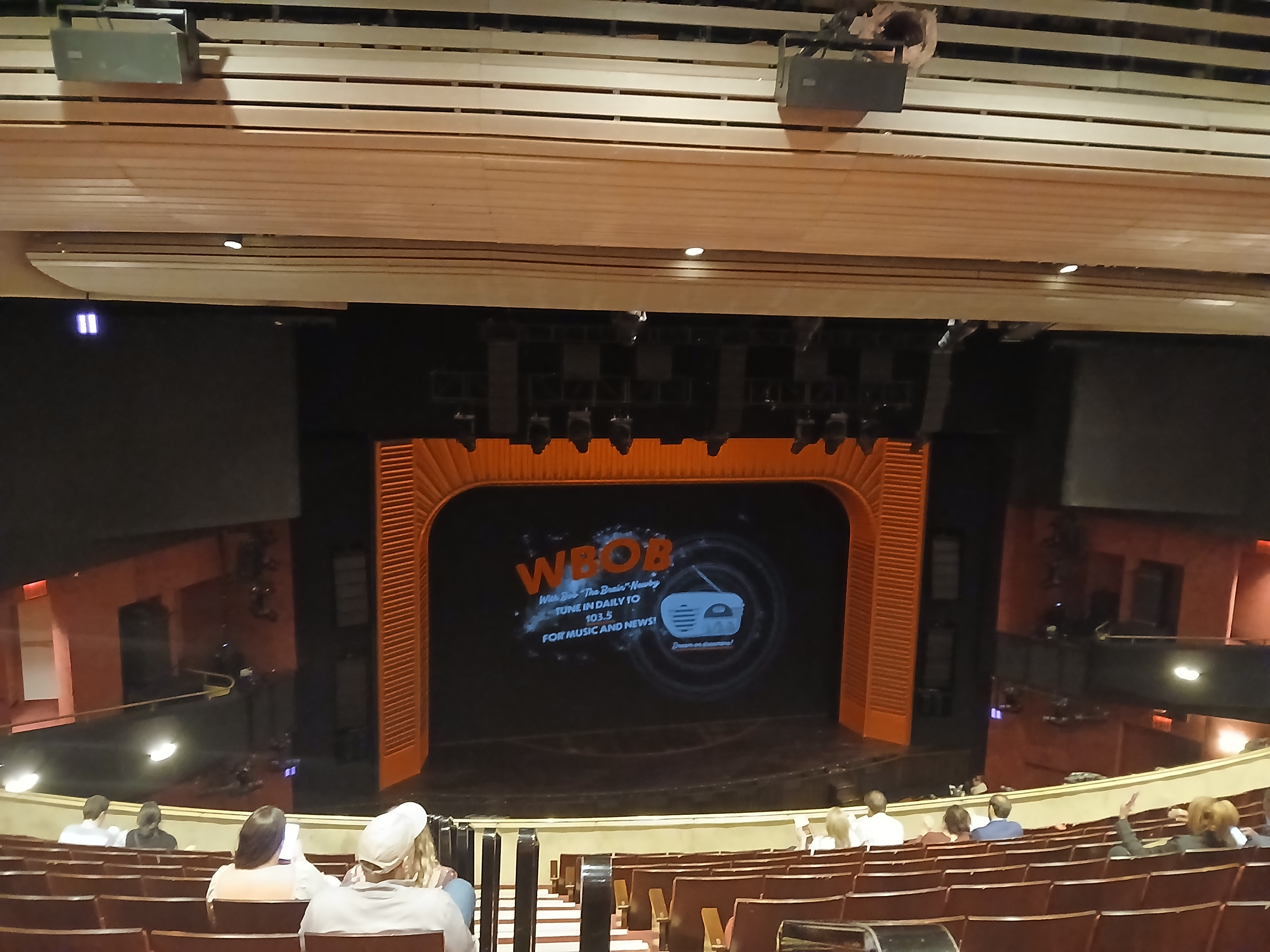
The auditorium as seen from the balcony level

During 2010, the Marquis hosted the Jimmy Awards for high school students, as well as the productions Come Fly Away and Donny & Marie: A Broadway Christmas. This was followed by Wonderland: Alice's New Musical Adventure (2011), Follies (2011), Evita (2012), Jekyll & Hyde (2013), and Il Divo – A Musical Affair: The Greatest Songs of Broadway (2013). A limited holiday engagement of The Rascals: Once Upon a Dream had also been proposed for 2013 but was canceled. As part of a settlement with the United States Department of Justice in 2014, the Nederlanders agreed to improve disabled access at their nine Broadway theaters, including the Marquis. The theater hosted only one production in 2014, The Illusionists' Witness the Impossible magic show, which made a profit on its limited run. The theater hosted Penn & Teller on Broadway and On Your Feet! in 2015; Lewis Black: Black to the Future in 2016; and Escape to Margaritaville and The Illusionists' Magic of the Holidays in 2018. The theater was also used to tape A Very Wicked Halloween: Celebrating 15 Years on Broadway, a television special, in 2018.

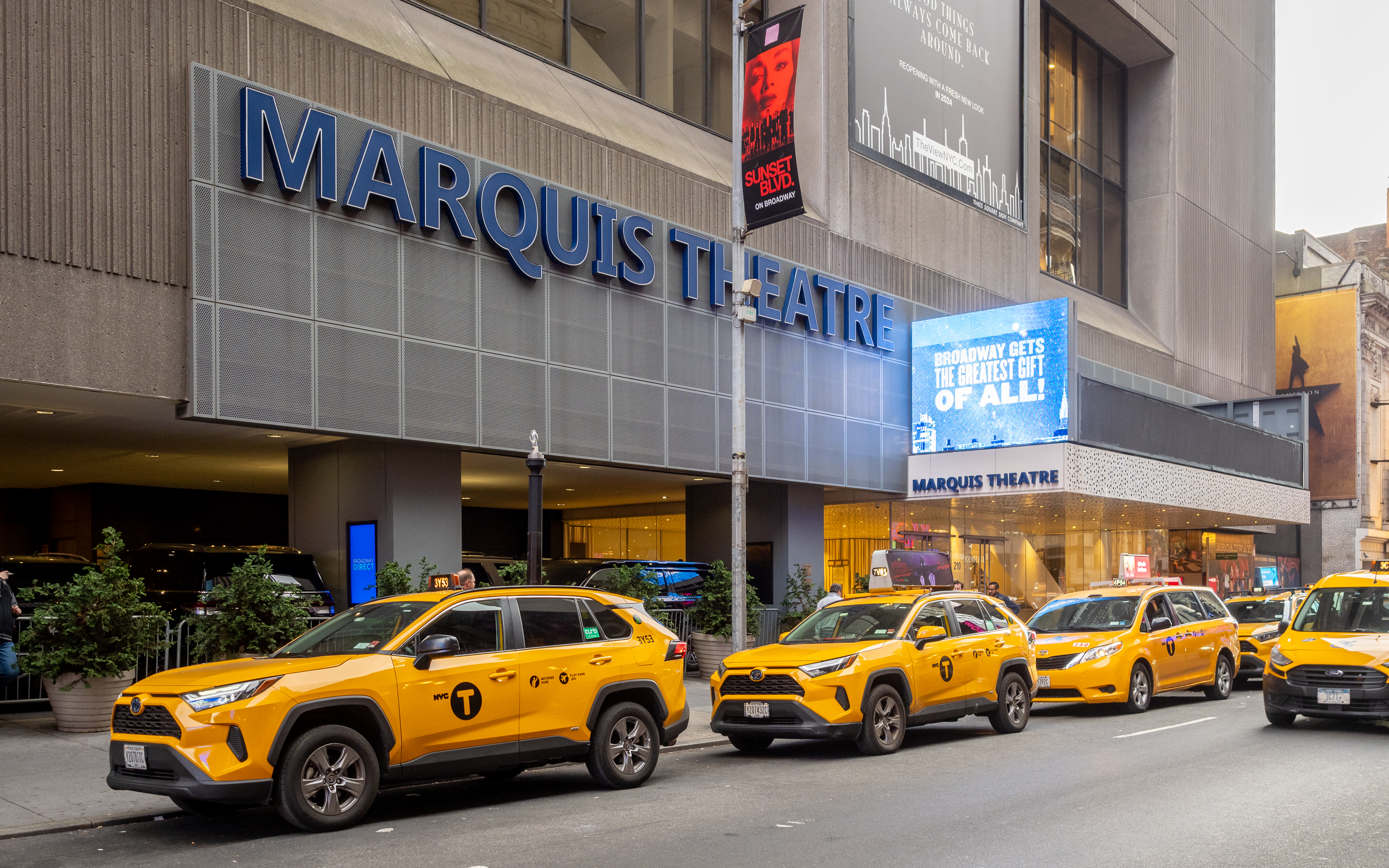
Exterior of the Marquis Theatre in 2024 before the opening of Elf the Musical

In September 2018, Vornado acquired full ownership of the Marquis Theatre and the hotel's retail space for $442 million. The following year, Vornado sold almost half of its stake to a group of investors that included Crown Acquisitions and the Qatar Investment Authority. Tootsie also played at the Marquis Theatre in 2019. The Marquis and all other Broadway theaters were temporarily closed on March 12, 2020, due to the COVID-19 pandemic. The theater reopened in April 2022, when the musical Beetlejuice relocated from the Winter Garden Theatre; the musical ran until January 2023. The Jonas Brothers performed a limited five-night engagement of the show Jonas Brothers on Broadway at the Marquis Theatre from March 14 to March 18, 2023. The jukebox musical Once Upon a One More Time opened at the Marquis Theatre in June 2023 and closed that September. In April 2024, a Broadway revival of The Wiz opened at the Marquis, running for four months. A Broadway revival of Elf the Musical opened in November 2024, running at the theater until January 2025. This was followed by Stranger Things: The First Shadow in April 2025, which is scheduled to close in January 2027. Another revival of Damn Yankees, with Neil Patrick Harris set to star, is scheduled to open at the Marquis in April 2027.

== Notable productions ==
Productions are listed by the year of their first performance.

Notable productions at the theater
Opening year	Name	Refs.
1986	Shirley Bassey	
1986	Me and My Girl	
1990	Shogun: The Musical	
1991	Gypsy	
1991	Nick & Nora	
1992	Man of La Mancha	
1993	The Goodbye Girl	
1994	Damn Yankees	
1995	Victor/Victoria	
1998	The Capeman	
1998	Peter Pan	
1999	Annie Get Your Gun	
2001	A Christmas Carol	
2002	Thoroughly Modern Millie	
2004	La Cage aux Folles	
2005	The Woman in White	
2006	The Drowsy Chaperone	
2008	Cry-Baby	
2008	Irving Berlin's White Christmas	
2009	Soul of Shaolin	
2009	9 to 5	
2009	Irving Berlin's White Christmas	
2010	Come Fly Away	
2011	Wonderland: Alice's New Musical Adventure	
2011	Follies	
2012	Evita	
2013	Jekyll & Hyde	
2013	Il Divo – A Musical Affair: The Greatest Songs of Broadway	
2014	The Illusionists: Witness the Impossible	
2015	Penn & Teller on Broadway	
2015	On Your Feet!	
2017	Lewis Black: Black to the Future	
2018	Escape to Margaritaville	
2018	The Illusionists — Magic of the Holidays	
2019	Tootsie	
2022	Beetlejuice	
2023	Jonas Brothers on Broadway	
2023	Once Upon a One More Time	
2024	The Wiz	
2024	Elf the Musical	
2025	Stranger Things: The First Shadow	
2027	Damn Yankees	

== Box office record ==
Evita achieved the box office record for the Marquis Theatre seven times; it grossed $1,586,902 over eight performances for the week ending May 10, 2012. This was surpassed by Beetlejuice, which grossed $2,462,831 over nine performances for the week ending January 1, 2023. The record was later broken by Stranger Things: The First Shadow with a gross of $2,510,948 for the week ending December 28, 2025. As of 2025, the 2024 Broadway revival of Elf the Musical holds the top two highest grossing eight-performance weeks, with grosses of $2,295,549 and $2,230,419, respectively, while Stranger Things: The First Shadow retains the box office record for a nine-performance week at the theater.

== See also ==
- List of Broadway theaters
