= Ocean Park Standoff =

American alternative pop band

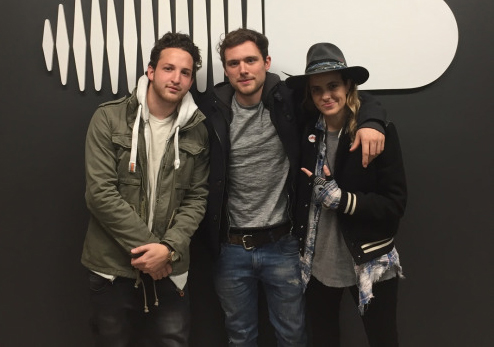
- Ocean Park Standoff in 2016

Background information
- Origin: Los Angeles, California, US
- Genres: Pop
- Years active: 2016–present
- Label: Hollywood
- Members: Samantha Ronson; Pete Nappi; Ethan Thompson
- Website: oceanparkstandoff.com

Ocean Park Standoff is an American pop band made up of Samantha Ronson, Pete Nappi, and Ethan Thompson. Their debut EP was released on Hollywood Records on March 3, 2017.

== History ==
The three band members originally met at a songwriting session in 2014. Ronson is an English musician/DJ and the sister of DJ/producer Mark Ronson; Ethan Thompson is an American vocalist and songwriter, and Pete Nappi is an American drummer/producer. The band was formed in 2016.

Their debut single "Good News" was released on October 7, 2016, along with its B-side, "Photos & Liquor". "Good News" reached number 13 on the Billboard Adult Pop Songs chart, and was on Amazon's Most Requested Lyrics list of 2017.

Their debut EP was released on Hollywood Records on March 3, 2017. On February 2, 2018, they released their second single, "Lost Boys (Ocean Park Standoff vs Seeb)", in collaboration with Seeb. On April 27, 2018, they released the single "If You Were Mine" featuring Lil Yachty. The video for "If You Were Mine" premiered on July 12, 2018.

== Band members ==
- Samantha Ronson - keys, guitar, vocals
- Pete Nappi - drums
- Ethan Thompson - vocals

== Performances ==
Ocean Park Standoff embarked on a US tour starting in February 2017. In February 2017, the band was chosen as Elvis Duran's Artist of the Month, and performed their hit "Good News" live on February 22 on NBC's Today show hosted by Kathie Lee Gifford. In the summer of 2017, the band went on a US tour with Third Eye Blind and Silversun Pickups. The band performed on June 29, 2017 at Bear's Den Showroom inside Seneca Niagara Casino & Hotel for listeners of Star 102.5 (WTSS) in Buffalo, New York. Starting in February 2018, the band opened for AJR on The Click Tour. On April 30, 2018, the band performed "If You Were Mine" on Conan. The band went on tour with Plain White T's in the summer of 2018.

On October 9, 2018, the band did a warm up performance before the 2018 American Music Awards. On October 10, 2018 the band returned to Buffalo, New York as a part of their fall tour to perform at Pink Party 2018 for listeners of Star 102.5 (WTSS). The annual concert benefits Roswell Park Comprehensive Cancer Center. They also performed their single "If You Were Mine" in-studio on Rob Lucas In The Morning during their visit.

== Discography ==
=== Extended plays ===
Title	Notes
Ocean Park Standoff	Release date: March 3, 2017; Label: Hollywood; Formats: Digital download

=== Singles ===
Title	Year	Peak chart positions		Album
Title	Year	US Adult	US Rock	Album
"Good News"	2016	13	12	Ocean Park Standoff
"Lost Boys" (vs. Seeb)	2018	—	—	TBA
"If You Were Mine" (featuring Lil Yachty)	2018	15	—	TBA
"Good Time"	2019	—	—	TBA

=== Remixes ===
- "Good News (Thompson Remix)" (2017)
- "Good News (Pete Nappi Remix)" (2017)
- "Good News (Samantha Ronson Remix)" (2017)
- "If You Were Mine (Thompson Acoustic Remix)" (2018)
- "If You Were Mine (Pete Nappi Remix)" (2018)
- "If You Were Mine (KC Lights Remix)" (2018)
- "Good Time (R3hab Remix)" (2019)
- "Good Time (Robert DeLong Remix)" (2019)
- "Good Time (Fat Free Remix)" (2019)
