= The Family Business (album) =

2023 greatest hits album by Jonas Brothers

- Digital edition cover

Greatest hits album by Jonas Brothers
- Released: February 17, 2023
- Recorded: 2006–2021
- Genre: Pop; pop rock
- Length: 75:30
- Label: Republic
- Producer: David Stewart; Greg Kurstin; Ian Kirkpatrick; Ilya; Jason Evigan; John Fields; LVC; Marshmello; Mattias Larsson; The Monsters and the Strangerz; Robin Fredriksson; Ryan Tedder; Shellback; Sir Nolan; Zach Skelton

Jonas Brothers chronology
Happiness Begins (2019)	The Family Business (2023)	The Album (2023)

Alternative cover
- Physical edition cover

The Family Business is the second greatest hits album by the American pop rock band Jonas Brothers. It was released on February 17, 2023, through Republic Records. The record was intended as a preparation for their then-upcoming sixth studio album, The Album (2023), and consists of seventeen of the band's hits and singles recorded throughout their career (from 2006 to 2021), as well as singles from Nick Jonas's solo venture and Joe Jonas's other band, DNCE.

== Background ==
Soon after the release of their fifth studio album, Happiness Begins (2019), the brothers started teasing the release of new music. On January 17, 2020, they released "What a Man Gotta Do", which marked their first single of the 2020s. Then, on May 15, 2020, the Jonas Brothers released the conjoined singles "X" and "Five More Minutes". The release of the singles led to fan speculation regarding a new album being released by the Jonas Brothers.

On May 14, 2020, during an interview with Business Insider, Kevin Jonas commented about the new body of work they were working on, which still had no release date. Eventually, the plans to release the new album were canceled due to the complications of the COVID-19 pandemic, with the brothers pursuing other ventures during this time. Afterwards, on May 21, 2021, the Jonas Brothers released a collaboration with the American DJ Marshmello, a standalone single titled "Leave Before You Love Me".

== Release ==
The compilation was released in preparation for the Jonas Brothers' sixth studio album, The Album. It was made available on streaming services and digital download one week before the release of the record's lead single, "Wings", on February 24, 2023. Then, after initially being released solely on digital formats, the compilation was subsequently also made available physically, exclusively for the 2023 Record Store Day (RSD), on November 24, with 3500 copies being produced on clear vinyl. Thereafter, the album was expanded to a wider physical release.

== Controversy ==
Promotional art for the TV series Supernatural. The picture was compared to the digital cover of the album, with discussions being brought regarding plagiarism.

The digital cover for the album sparked a discussion on the internet after some users noticed some similarities between the cover art, and a promotional image for the CW's television series Supernatural (2005-2020). It all started after a Twitter user posted a side-by-side picture, bringing some attention to the matter. The discussion surrounding the subject was whether the band was copying the TV show, or simply taking inspiration from it.

American actor Misha Collins, who portrayed Angel Castiel on the series, commented on the comparisons the series' promotional artwork and the Jonas Brothers' new album cover, and went on to defend the brothers. He joked it wasn't plagiarism, but a "recycle", so it "helps the environment". The actor then congratulated the band for "doing [their] part for the planet".

Jonathan Bailey of website Plagiarism Today wrote that both the phrase "family business" and the triangular position of the cover art are too generic to be considered either plagiarism or a homage to the series. Specially considering the band is formed by actual family members and that both the band and the show had their start in the same year (2005), which, for him, would make it unlikely for them to reference each other.

== Reception ==
Professional ratings
Review scores
Source	Rating
AllMusic	4/5 stars

The Family Business received a four out of five stars rating on AllMusic, with critic Stephen Thomas Erlewine calling the album a "generous sampler" that mixes both newer and older songs, that "serves as a comprehensive retrospective" of the band's catalog, even though it's not presented in a chronological order.

Through September 16, 2023, The Family Business charted on the US Billboard 200, peaking at number 112. It stayed on the chart for eight weeks. The album peaked at number 14 on the Official New Zealand Music Chart, and received a platinum certification by the Recorded Music NZ (RMNZ) in New Zealand. The record reached a peak of 75 on the Billboard Canadian Albums chart. It also peaked at number 84 on the Australian ARIA Albums Chart.

On March 14, 2025, the album received a gold certification on the British Phonographic Industry (BPI). In August 2025, following the debut of the Jonas20: Greetings from Your Hometown Tour, the album saw a resurgence on North American charts. It reappeared on the US Billboard 200, at number 177, while also charting at 78 at the Billboard Canadian Albums, on the week of August 30, 2025.

== Track listing ==
The Family Business track listing
No.	Title	Writer(s)	Original album	Length
1.	"Sucker"	Nicholas Jonas; Joseph Jonas; Kevin Jonas II; Ryan Tedder; Adam Feeney; Louis Bell	Happiness Begins (2019)	3:01
2.	"Burnin' Up"	N. Jonas; J. Jonas; K. Jonas	A Little Bit Longer (2008)	2:54
3.	"Only Human"	N. Jonas; J. Jonas; K. Jonas; Karl Schuster	Happiness Begins	3:03
4.	"Year 3000"	James Bourne; Mattie Jay; Charlie Simpson; Steve Robson; Graham Jay	It's About Time (2006)	3:21
5.	"S.O.S"	N. Jonas	Jonas Brothers (2007)	2:33
6.	"Leave Before You Love Me" (with Marshmello)	Marshmello; Alessandro Lindblad; Nicholas Gale; Heavy Mellow; Richard Boardman; Pablo Bowman; Geoff Morrow; Christian Arnold; David Martin; Phil Plested; William Vaughan		2:34
7.	"What a Man Gotta Do"	N. Jonas; J. Jonas; K. Jonas; Tedder; David Stewart; Jessica Agombar		3:00
8.	"Cool"	N. Jonas; J. Jonas; K. Jonas; Tedder; Zach Skelton; Casey Smith	Happiness Begins	2:47
9.	"Lovebug"	N. Jonas; J. Jonas; K. Jonas	A Little Bit Longer	3:40
10.	"When You Look Me in the Eyes"	N. Jonas; J. Jonas; K. Jonas; Kevin Jonas Sr.; PJ Bianco; Raymond Boyd	Jonas Brothers	4:09
11.	"Fly with Me"	N. Jonas; J. Jonas; K. Jonas; Greg Garbowsky	Lines, Vines and Trying Times (2009)	3:54
12.	"Hold On"	N. Jonas; J. Jonas; K. Jonas	Jonas Brothers	2:45
13.	"I Believe"	N. Jonas; Greg Kurstin; Maureen McDonald	Happiness Begins	3:37
14.	"Paranoid"	N. Jonas; J. Jonas; K. Jonas; Cathy Dennis; Fields	Lines, Vines and Trying Times	3:38
15.	"That's Just The Way We Roll"	N. Jonas; J. Jonas; K. Jonas; William McCauley III	Jonas Brothers	2:53
16.	"Rollercoaster"	Tedder; Skelton; Jonas Jeberg; Michael Pollack; Smith	Happiness Begins	3:01
17.	"A Little Bit Longer"	N. Jonas	A Little Bit Longer	3:25
18.	"Cake by the Ocean"	J. Jonas; Justin Tranter; Mattias Larsson; Robin Fredriksson	DNCE (2016)	3:39
19.	"Toothbrush"	Jonas; Salmanzadeh; Görransson; Ghaleb	DNCE	3:51
20.	"Jealous"	N. Jonas; Simon Wilcox; Nolan Lambroza	Nick Jonas (2014)	3:43
21.	"Close" (featuring Tove Lo)	Fredriksson; Larsson; Julia Michaels; Tranter; Tove Nilsson	Last Year Was Complicated (2016)	3:54
22.	"Chains"	Jason Evigan; Ammar Malik; Daniel Parker	Nick Jonas	3:23
23.	"Levels"	Sean Douglas; Talay Riley; Ian Kirkpatrick; Marcus Lomax; Stefan Johnson; Jordan Johnson; Sam Martin	Nick Jonas X2 (2015)	2:47
Total length:				75:30

Note

- "Year 3000" is a cover of the song by the English pop-punk band Busted.

== Personnel ==
Credits are adapted from the album's liner notes.

=== Jonas Brothers ===
- Joe Jonas – vocals (1–19), background vocals (8, 19)
- Nick Jonas – vocals (1–17, 20–23), background vocals (8)
- Kevin Jonas – background vocals (4, 8); guitar (1–17)

=== Additional musicians ===
- Ryan Tedder – acoustic guitar, background vocals, drum programming (1, 7); bass, programming (1), electric guitar (7, 8)
- Louis Bell – bass (1)
- Homer Steinweiss – drums (1)
- Andrew DeRoberts – electric guitar (1)
- Frank Dukes – electric guitar (1)
- Big Rob – featured vocals (2)
- John Fields – bass guitar, additional keyboards, guitar (2, 5, 9, 10, 12, 15, 17)
- Dorian Crozier – drums, percussion, programming (2, 5, 9, 10–12, 14, 15, 17)
- Eric Gorfain – violin (2, 9, 17)
- Daphne Chen – violin (2, 9, 17)
- Leah Katz – viola (2, 9, 17)
- Richard Dodd – cello (2, 9, 17)
- Wojtek Goral – alto saxophone, flute (3)
- Shellback – background vocals, bass, keyboards, programming, tambourine (3)
- Tomas Jonsson – baritone saxophone, tenor saxophone (3)
- Mattias Bylund – bassoon, horn (3)
- Michael Engström – bass (3)
- Mia Samuelsson – flugelhorn (3)
- Nils-Petter Ankarblom – horn, horn arrangement (3)
- Jason McNab – tambourine (3)
- Jimmy Carr – tambourine (3)
- Kasper Komar – tambourine (3)
- Robert Möllard – tambourine (3)
- Peter Noos Johansson – trombone (3)
- Janne Bjerger – trombone (3)
- Magnus Johansson – trumpet (3)
- John R. Angier – piano (4)
- Jimmie Bones – guitar (4)
- Thad DeBrock – drums (4)
- Steve Greenwell – bass guitar, keyboards (4)
- Jon Leidersdorff – drums (4)
- Michael Mangini – guitar, keyboards (4)
- John Taylor – rhythm, lead guitar, background vocals (5, 10, 12, 15)
- Stephen Lu – string arrangements, conducting (5, 10–12, 14, 15, 17)
- Chris Lord-Alge – mixing (5, 10, 12, 15)
- David Stewart – acoustic guitar, background vocals, drum programming, electric guitar (7)
- Casey Smith – background vocals (8, 16)
- Zach Skelton – electric guitar (8, 16); bass, programming (8, 16); drums (8), drum programming (16); background vocals, keyboards (16)
- Ken Chastain – percussion, programming, keyboards (11, 14)
- Mozella – background vocals (13)
- Greg Kurstin – bass, drums, electric guitar, synthesizer (13)
- Michael Pollack – background vocals (16)
- Ted Moock – background vocals (16)
- James Ghaleb – background vocals, guitar, percussion (19)
- Justin Tranter – background vocals (18)
- Rickard Göransson – background vocals, bass, guitar, percussion (19)
- Ilya – keyboards, percussion, programming (19)
- Peter Carlsson – drums (19)
- Nolan Lambroza – bass vocals, drums, guitar, keyboards, percussion, programming (20)
- Tove Lo – featured vocals (21)
- Mattman & Robin – background vocals, guitar, programming (18); bass, keyboards, drums, percussion (18, 21); marimba, snaps, handclaps (21)
- Julia Michaels – background vocals (21)
- Ammar Malik – background vocals (22)
- Ian Kirkpatrick – background vocals, guitar, programming (23)
- The Monsters & Strangerz – programming (23)

=== Technical ===
- Rich Rich – engineering (2, 13)
- Steve Greenberg – producer (4)
- Steve Greenwell – engineering (4)
- Femio Hernández – mixing assistant (4)
- Tom Lord-Alge – mixing (4)
- Michael Mangini – producer (4)
- Ken Wright – assistant engineering (4)
- Randy Merrill – mastering (5, 7, 10, 12, 15)
- Serban Ghenea – mixing (5, 7, 10, 12, 15, 18, 19, 21)
- John Hanes – mix engineering (5, 10, 12, 15, 18, 21)
- Brandon Buttner – engineering (6)
- Manny Marroquin – mix engineering, mastering (6, 22, 23)
- David Stewart – engineering (7)
- Paul David Hager – mixing, additional engineering (11, 14)
- Will Owsley – additional engineering (11, 14)
- Ken Chastain – additional engineering (11, 14)
- Michael B. Nelson – additional engineering (11, 14)
- Steven Miller – strings engineer (11, 14)
- Wesley Seidman – assistant strings engineer (11, 14)
- Dave McNair – mastering (11, 14)
- Sam Holland – engineering (19)
- Cory Bice – engineering assistance (19)
- Jeremy Lertola – engineering assistance (19)
- Nolan Lambroza – engineering (20)
- James Krausse – mix engineering (20)
- Tony Maserati – mix engineering (20)
- John Cranfield – recording (21)
- Chris Gehringer – mastering (21)
- Mattman & Robin – production, programming (21)
- Noah Passovoy – recording (21)
- The Struts – recording (21)
- Jesse String – engineering (22)
- Ian Kirkpatrick – engineering (23)
- The Monsters & Strangerz – engineering (23)
- Chris Galland – mixing, assistant engineering (23)
- Ike Schultz – mixing, assistant engineering (23)
- Jeff Jackson – mixing, assistant engineering (23)

== Charts ==
=== Weekly charts ===
Weekly chart performance for The Family Business
Chart (2023)	Peak position
Australian Albums (ARIA)	84
Canadian Albums (Billboard)	75
Irish Albums (IRMA)	99
New Zealand Albums (RMNZ)	14
US Billboard 200	112

=== Year-end charts ===
Year-end chart performance for The Family Business
Chart (2024)	Position
New Zealand Albums (RMNZ)	35

== Certifications ==
Certifications for The Family Business
Region	Certification	Certified units/sales
New Zealand (RMNZ)	Platinum	15,000^{‡}
United Kingdom (BPI)	Gold	100,000^{‡}
^{‡} Sales+streaming figures based on certification alone.

== Release history ==
The Family Business release history
Region	Date	Format(s)	Edition(s)	Label	Ref.
Various	February 17, 2023	Digital download; streaming	Digital	Republic	
Various	November 24, 2023	Vinyl LP	Record Store Day	Republic	
Various	January 9, 2024	CD; vinyl LP	Physical	Republic	
