= Like It's Christmas =

2019 single by Jonas Brothers

Single by Jonas Brothers
- Released: November 8, 2019
- Length: 3:22
- Label: Republic
- Songwriters: Nicholas Jonas; Joseph Jonas; Kevin Jonas II; Gian Stone; Jason Evigan; Freddy Wexler; Mike Elizondo; Annika Wells
- Producers: Evigan; Wexler; Elizondo

Jonas Brothers singles chronology
"Lonely" (2019)	"Like It's Christmas" (2019)	"What a Man Gotta Do" (2020)

Lyric video
- "Like It's Christmas" on YouTube

"Like It's Christmas" is a Christmas song by American pop rock band Jonas Brothers. It was released through Republic Records on November 8, 2019. The three band members, Nick, Joe, and Kevin Jonas, wrote the song with producer Gian Stone and co-producers Jason Evigan, Freddy Wexler, and Mike Elizondo, alongside Annika Wells. "Like It's Christmas" is their fourth Christmas song, following "Girl of My Dreams" in 2007, "Joyful Kings" in 2008, and "Summertime Anthem" in 2009. The song appears as the closing track on their soundtrack album, A Very Jonas Christmas Movie (2025), which was released over six years after the song.

== Background ==
The group announced the song's name and release date on November 4, 2019.

== Commercial performance ==
"Like It's Christmas" reached number one on the US Adult Contemporary chart in December 2019, becoming the Jonas Brothers' second number one on the chart. It also debuted at number 83 on the Billboard Hot 100 and eventually peaked at number 27 on the week ending January 3, 2026.

== Live performances ==
The band performed the song on their Happiness Begins Tour beginning on December 4, 2019, in Omaha. On December 13, 2019, they performed the song along with the singles "Burnin' Up", "Sucker", "Cool" and "Only Human". They performed the song live on an episode of the Netflix show Dash & Lily, produced by Nick Jonas.

== Credits and personnel ==
Credits adapted from Tidal.

Musicians

- Mike Elizondo – guitar, bass guitar
- Jason Evigan – guitar, background vocals
- Ben Rice – guitar
- Gian Stone – guitar, keyboards, programmer, background vocals
- Freddy Wexler – background vocals
- Annika Wells – background vocals
- Donnell Butler – background vocals
- Jerry Hey – horn arranger
- Nick Blount – keyboards
- Kurt Thum – keyboards
- Daniel Higgins – saxophone
- Bill Reichenbach Jr. – trombone
- Gary Grant – trumpet
- Wayne Bergeron – trumpet

Technical

- Gian Stone – producer, vocal producer, engineer
- Mike Elizondo – co-producer
- Jason Evigan – co-producer, vocal producer
- Freddy Wexler – co-producer, vocal producer
- Lionel Crasta – engineer
- Rafael Fadul – engineer
- Andrew Hey – engineer
- Ben Rice – engineer
- Ryan Tedder – executive producer
- Randy Merrill – mastering engineer
- John Hanes – mix engineer
- Serban Ghenea – mixer

== Charts ==
=== Weekly charts ===
Weekly chart performance for "Like It's Christmas"
Chart (2019–2026)	Peak position
Australia (ARIA)	47
Austria (Ö3 Austria Top 40)	30
Belgium (Ultratip Bubbling Under Flanders)	18
Belgium (Ultratip Wallonia)	36
Canada Hot 100 (Billboard)	41
Canada AC (Billboard)	2
Canada Hot AC (Billboard)	2
Germany (GfK)	27
Global 200 (Billboard)	38
Greece International (IFPI)	64
Hungary (Single Top 40)	17
Hungary (Stream Top 40)	26
Ireland (IRMA)	47
Lithuania (AGATA)	50
Netherlands (Dutch Top 40)	24
Netherlands (Single Top 100)	83
New Zealand Hot Singles (RMNZ)	12
Poland Airplay (ZPAV)	48
Poland (Polish Streaming Top 100)	99
Portugal (AFP)	196
Slovakia Singles Digital (ČNS IFPI)	72
South Korea (Gaon)	97
Sweden (Sverigetopplistan)	61
Switzerland (Schweizer Hitparade)	28
UK Singles (Official Charts)	53
US Billboard Hot 100	27
US Adult Contemporary (Billboard)	1
US Adult Pop Airplay (Billboard)	32
US Holiday 100 (Billboard)	18
US Rolling Stone Top 100	13

=== Year-end charts ===
Year-end chart performance for "Like It's Christmas"
Chart (2020)	Position
US Adult Contemporary (Billboard)	37

=== All-time charts ===
All-time chart performance for "Like It's Christmas"
Chart	Position
US Holiday 100 (Billboard)	70

== Certifications ==
Certifications for "Like It's Christmas"
Region	Certification	Certified units/sales
Canada (Music Canada)	2× Platinum	160,000^{‡}
Denmark (IFPI Danmark)	Gold	45,000^{‡}
Germany (BVMI)	Gold	300,000^{‡}
New Zealand (RMNZ)	Gold	15,000^{‡}
Poland (ZPAV)	Gold	25,000^{‡}
United Kingdom (BPI)	Silver	200,000^{‡}
United States (RIAA)	Platinum	1,000,000^{‡}
^{‡} Sales+streaming figures based on certification alone.

== See also ==
- List of Billboard Adult Contemporary number ones of 2019
