= Runaway (Sebastián Yatra, Daddy Yankee and Natti Natasha song) =

2019 single by Sebastián Yatra, Daddy Yankee and Natti Natasha featuring Jonas Brothers

Single by Sebastián Yatra, Daddy Yankee and Natti Natasha featuring Jonas Brothers

from the album Dharma
- Language: Spanish; English
- Released: June 21, 2019
- Genre: Latin pop • Reggaeton
- Length: 3:20
- Label: Universal Music Latino
- Songwriters: Sebastián Giraldo; Ramón Ayala; Natalia Alexandra Gutiérrez Batista; Nicholas Jonas; Joseph Jonas; Kevin Jonas II; Andrés Torres; Mauricio Rengifo
- Producers: Andrés Torres; Mauricio Rengifo

Sebastián Yatra singles chronology
"En Cero" (2019)	"Runaway" (2019)	"Bonita" (2019)

Daddy Yankee singles chronology
"No Lo Trates" (2019)	"Runaway" (2019)	"Si Supieras" (2019)

Natti Natasha singles chronology
"Deja Tus Besos" (2019)	"Runaway" (2019)	"Instagram" (2019)

Jonas Brothers singles chronology
"Cool" (2019)	"Runaway" (2019)	"Only Human" (2019)

Music video
- "Runaway" on YouTube

"Runaway" is a song by Colombian singer Sebastián Yatra, Puerto Rican rapper and singer Daddy Yankee, and Dominican singer Natti Natasha featuring vocals from American group Jonas Brothers. It was released as a single on June 21, 2019. The song reached number one in Ecuador, El Salvador, Nicaragua, Panama and Peru. In October, it reached the number one position on the Latin Airplay chart.

== Background ==
On June 21, 2019, Yatra, Yankee, and Natasha released the track "Runaway", featuring the Jonas Brothers. "Runaway" is the first bilingual song Yatra has released. After writing the chorus in English, Yatra realized that he wanted a mainstream English-language musician to feature on the track, putting the recording of the song on hold for two years while he searched for the right collaborators. Commenting on the song, Yatra stated, "you feel the happiness in the track."

== Promotion ==
All the artists along with Jonas Brothers members Nick, Joe, and Kevin revealed the track on social media on June 14, 2019, also sharing the cover art.

== Music video ==
The music video was released alongside the single. It was directed by Daniel Duran and filmed in New York City, starring all artists. The video has over 352 million views on YouTube as of December 2021.

== Live performance ==
It has been performed live on the Jonas Brothers' Happiness Begins Tour for the first time on August 7, 2019, the first tour date. On November 8, 2019, the brothers performed the song along their singles "Sucker" and "Only Human" during the LOS40 Music Awards 2019. On the same date, they released their new holiday song, "Like It's Christmas".

== Charts ==
=== Weekly charts ===
Chart (2019)	Peak position
Argentina (Argentina Hot 100)	13
Bolivia (Monitor Latino)	12
Chile (Monitor Latino)	10
Colombia (Monitor Latino)	12
Colombia (National-Report)	3
Ecuador (National-Report)	1
El Salvador (Monitor Latino)	1
Guatemala (Monitor Latino)	12
Honduras (Monitor Latino)	13
Mexico Airplay (Billboard)	4
Nicaragua (Monitor Latino)	1
Panama (Monitor Latino)	1
Paraguay (Monitor Latino)	19
Paraguay (SGP)	23
Peru (Monitor Latino)	1
Puerto Rico (Monitor Latino)	1
Romania (Airplay 100)	68
Spain (PROMUSICAE)	29
Switzerland (Schweizer Hitparade)	96
US Bubbling Under Hot 100 (Billboard)	11
US Hot Latin Songs (Billboard)	12
US Latin Airplay (Billboard)	1
US Latin Rhythm Airplay (Billboard)	1
Venezuela (Monitor Latino)	7

=== Year-end charts ===
Chart (2019)	Position
Argentina Airplay (Monitor Latino)	32
Chile Airplay (Monitor Latino)	70
Costa Rica Airplay (Monitor Latino)	63
Ecuador Airplay (Monitor Latino)	24
El Salvador Airplay (Monitor Latino)	18
Guatemala Airplay (Monitor Latino)	17
Honduras Airplay (Monitor Latino)	29
Mexico Airplay (Monitor Latino)	83
Nicaragua Airplay (Monitor Latino)	29
Panama Airplay (Monitor Latino)	20
Paraguay Airplay (Monitor Latino)	19
Peru Airplay (Monitor Latino)	24
Puerto Rico Airplay (Monitor Latino)	13
Uruguay Airplay (Monitor Latino)	35
US Hot Latin Songs (Billboard)	49
US Latin Pop Airplay Songs (Billboard)	39
Venezuela Airplay (Monitor Latino)	36

== Certifications ==
Region	Certification	Certified units/sales
Brazil (Pro-Música Brasil)	Platinum	40,000^{‡}
Mexico (AMPROFON)	Diamond+2× Platinum	420,000^{‡}
Spain (Promusicae)	Platinum	60,000^{‡}
United States (RIAA)	7× Platinum (Latin)	420,000^{‡}
Streaming
Central America (CFC)	Platinum	7,000,000^{†}
^{‡} Sales+streaming figures based on certification alone.^{†} Streaming-only figures based on certification alone.

== See also ==
- List of Billboard Hot Latin Songs and Latin Airplay number ones of 2019
