= I Need You Christmas =

2020 single by Jonas Brothers

Single by Jonas Brothers
- Released: October 30, 2020
- Length: 3:26
- Label: Republic
- Songwriters: Connor McDonough; Riley McDonough; Nathan Cunningham; Marc Sibley; Joel Castillo
- Producer: Greg Kurstin

Jonas Brothers singles chronology
| "X" / "Five More Minutes" (2020) | "I Need You Christmas" (2020) | "Leave Before You Love Me" (2021) |

"I Need You Christmas" is a Christmas song by American group Jonas Brothers. It was released on October 30, 2020. It is the fifth Christmas song released by the band after "Girl of My Dreams" in 2007, "Joyful Kings" in 2008, "Summertime Anthem" in 2009 and "Like It's Christmas" in 2019.

== Background ==
On the song, Nick and Joe Jonas are on vocals, while Kevin plays the piano along with Greg Kurstin, the producer of the song. The song was written by Marc Sibley (Space Primates), Nathan Cunningham (Space Primates), Connor McDonough, Riley McDonough and Joel Castillo. The instrumental of the song features a somber piano loop throughout the entirety of the song.

Lyrically, the song is about how joyful it felt to spend Christmas together with family in the previous years. However, this year, the normal routine did not happen due to the COVID-19 pandemic, which went on at the time of the release of the song. In order to prevent from getting the coronavirus, people were encouraged to practice social distancing and quarantine themselves in their homes, which essentially restricted people from going to see their families.

The group announced the song's name, artwork and release date one day before it was released, on October 29, 2020, as a band and individually. Additionally, Joe used the memory timeline feature on Instagram and posted the growth about how he and the other two brothers celebrated Christmas together with family, from childhood to adulthood, explaining what this year was to him and his loved ones.

== Critical reception ==
Rolling Stone's Althea Legaspi said that "I Need You Christmas" is a piano-and-strings buoyed song has a classic Christmas vibe, with lyrics that recall hanging with friends by the fire, angels on treetops and waiting in anticipation for Santa. E Online's Mona Thomas said, "The song has the soothing sound of a classic Christmas ballad and recalled many familiar holiday activities, which is very aligned with the cover art (and what everyone is looking for this season)." Heatworld's Lucy Smith said, "We'd say it sits somewhere between Bing Crosby and Michael Bublé and, though it may still be October, it's going to be the only thing we're listening to for the foreseeable."

== Lyric video ==
The lyric video for the song was released on November 16, 2020. The video features family photos and home videos from the trio’s life, including old footage from when Nick, Joe and Kevin were young boys. Also included are more recent photos of Kevin with wife Danielle Deleasa and their two children, Joe with his then-fiancée and now ex-wife Sophie Turner, and Nick with wife Priyanka Chopra and their family.

== Charts ==
| Chart (2020–2021) | Peak position |
|---|---|
| Belgium (Ultratip Bubbling Under Flanders) | 16 |
| Canada (Canadian Hot 100) | 88 |
| Canada AC (Billboard) | 15 |
| Ireland (IRMA) | 77 |
| New Zealand Hot Singles (RMNZ) | 32 |
| UK Singles (OCC) | 86 |
| US Bubbling Under Hot 100 Singles (Billboard) | 4 |
| US Adult Contemporary (Billboard) | 16 |
| US Digital Song Sales (Billboard) | 28 |
| US Holiday Digital Song Sales (Billboard) | 1 |
| US Holiday 100 (Billboard) | 97 |

== Release history ==
Release dates and formats for "I Need You Christmas"
| Region | Date | Formats | Label | Ref. |
|---|---|---|---|---|
| Various | October 30, 2020 | Digital download; streaming | Republic | |
