= List of number-one albums of 2019 (Canada) =

These are the Canadian number-one albums of 2019. The chart is compiled by Nielsen SoundScan and published in Billboard magazine as Top Canadian Albums.

== Number-one albums ==
Key
†	Indicates best-performing album of 2019

Issue date	Album	Artist(s)	Ref.
January 5	Christmas	Michael Bublé	
January 12	A Star Is Born †	Lady Gaga and Bradley Cooper	
January 19	A Star Is Born †	Lady Gaga and Bradley Cooper	
January 26	Hoodie SZN	A Boogie wit da Hoodie	
February 2	The Wizrd	Future	
February 9	DNA	Backstreet Boys	
February 16	A Star Is Born †	Lady Gaga and Bradley Cooper	
February 23	Thank U, Next	Ariana Grande	
March 2	Thank U, Next	Ariana Grande	
March 9	A Star Is Born †	Lady Gaga and Bradley Cooper	
March 16	Shine a Light	Bryan Adams	
March 23	Death Race for Love	Juice Wrld	
March 30	Thank U, Next	Ariana Grande	
April 6	Bad Habits	Nav	
April 13	When We All Fall Asleep, Where Do We Go?	Billie Eilish	
April 20	Free Spirit	Khalid	
April 27	Map of the Soul: Persona	BTS	
May 4	When We All Fall Asleep, Where Do We Go?	Billie Eilish	
May 11	Hurts 2B Human	Pink	
May 18	When We All Fall Asleep, Where Do We Go?	Billie Eilish	
May 25	When We All Fall Asleep, Where Do We Go?	Billie Eilish	
June 1	Father of Asahd	DJ Khaled	
June 8	L'étrange pays	Jean Leloup	
June 15	When We All Fall Asleep, Where Do We Go?	Billie Eilish	
June 22	Happiness Begins	Jonas Brothers	
June 29	When We All Fall Asleep, Where Do We Go?	Billie Eilish	
July 6	7	Lil Nas X	
July 13	7	Lil Nas X	
July 20	Revenge of the Dreamers III	Various artists	
July 27	No.6 Collaborations Project	Ed Sheeran	
August 3	No.6 Collaborations Project	Ed Sheeran	
August 10	No.6 Collaborations Project	Ed Sheeran	
August 17	Care Package	Drake	
August 24	We Are Not Your Kind	Slipknot	
August 31	So Much Fun	Young Thug	
September 7	Lover	Taylor Swift	
September 14	Fear Inoculum	Tool	
September 21	Hollywood's Bleeding	Post Malone	
September 28	Hollywood's Bleeding	Post Malone	
October 5	Hollywood's Bleeding	Post Malone	
October 12	Hollywood's Bleeding	Post Malone	
October 19	A Pill for Loneliness	City and Colour	
October 26	Hollywood's Bleeding	Post Malone	
November 2	Hollywood's Bleeding	Post Malone	
November 9	Jesus Is King	Kanye West	
November 16	Hollywood's Bleeding	Post Malone	
November 23	What You See Is What You Get	Luke Combs	
November 30	Courage	Celine Dion	
December 7	Thanks for the Dance	Leonard Cohen	
December 14	Hollywood's Bleeding	Post Malone	
December 21	Romance	Camila Cabello	
December 28	Fine Line	Harry Styles	

== See also ==
- List of Canadian Hot 100 number-one singles of 2019
