= List of Canadian Hot 100 number-one singles of 2019 =

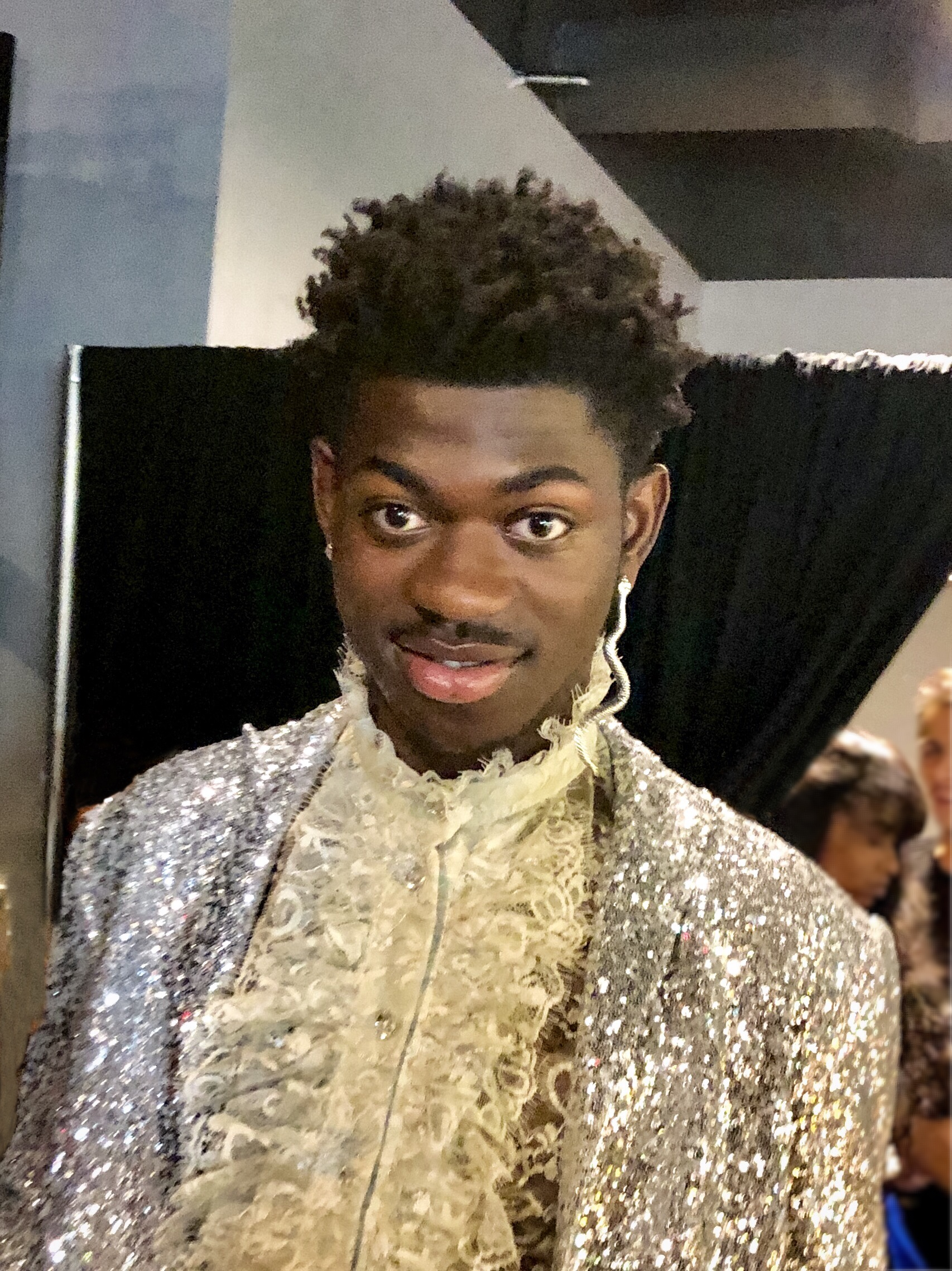
"Old Town Road" by Lil Nas X (pictured) featuring Billy Ray Cyrus spent nineteen consecutive weeks at number one on the Canadian Hot 100, breaking the record for the longest-running number-one song in the chart's history. It later ranked as the best-performing single of the year.

This is a list of the Canadian Hot 100 number-one singles of 2019. The Canadian Hot 100 is a chart that ranks the best-performing singles of Canada. Its data, published by Billboard magazine and compiled by Nielsen SoundScan, is based collectively on each single's weekly physical and digital sales, as well as airplay and streaming.

== Chart history ==
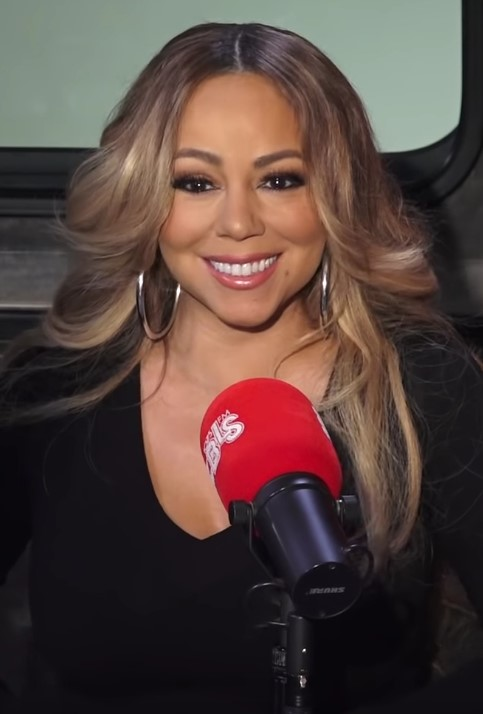
Mariah Carey (pictured)'s "All I Want for Christmas Is You" hit number one for the first time ever, 25 years after its debut in 1994. It is also the first Christmas song to top the Canadian Hot 100.

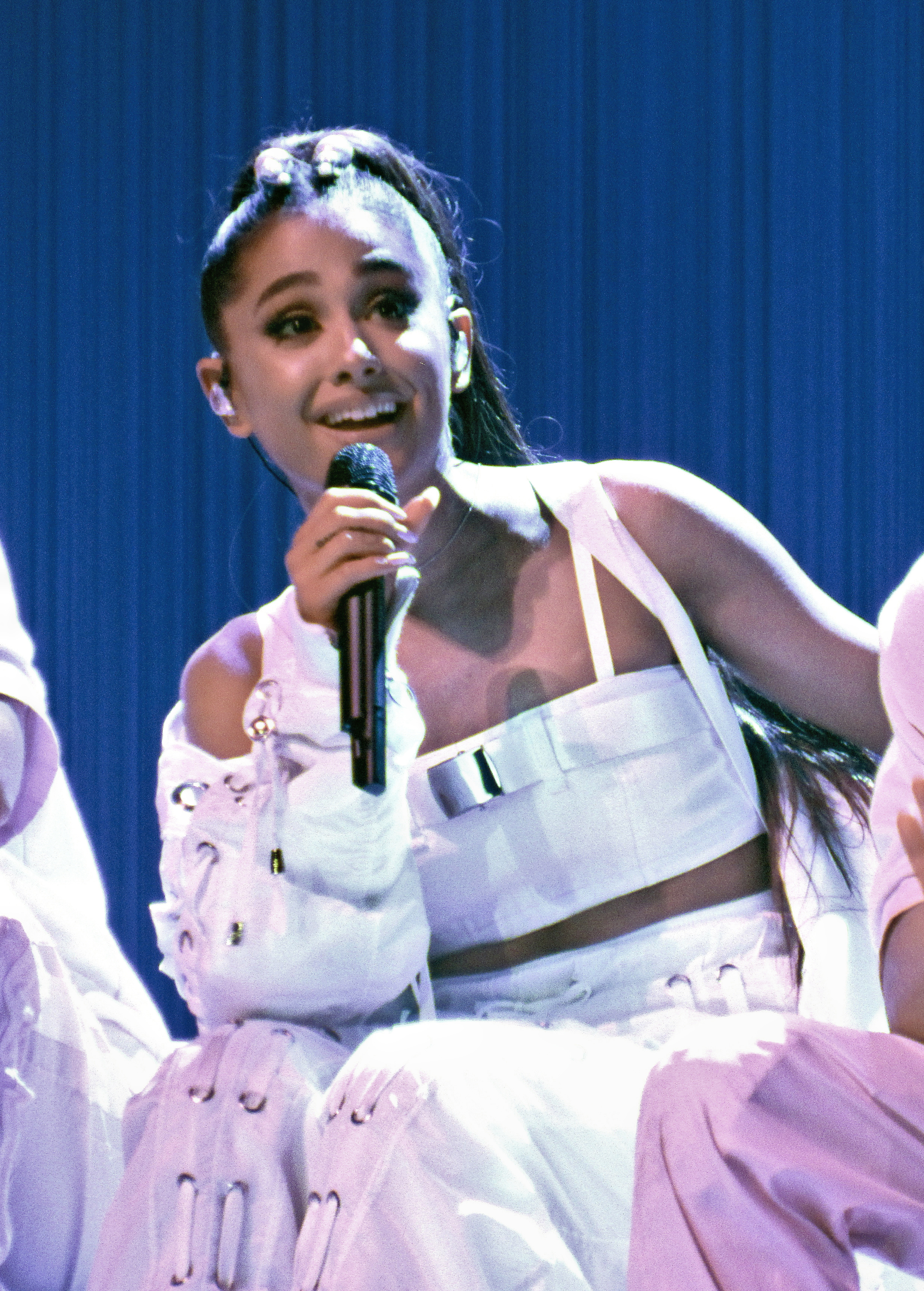
"7 Rings" by Ariana Grande (pictured) debuted at number one, becoming her second number-one song and making her the third female artist to earn multiple number-one debuts.

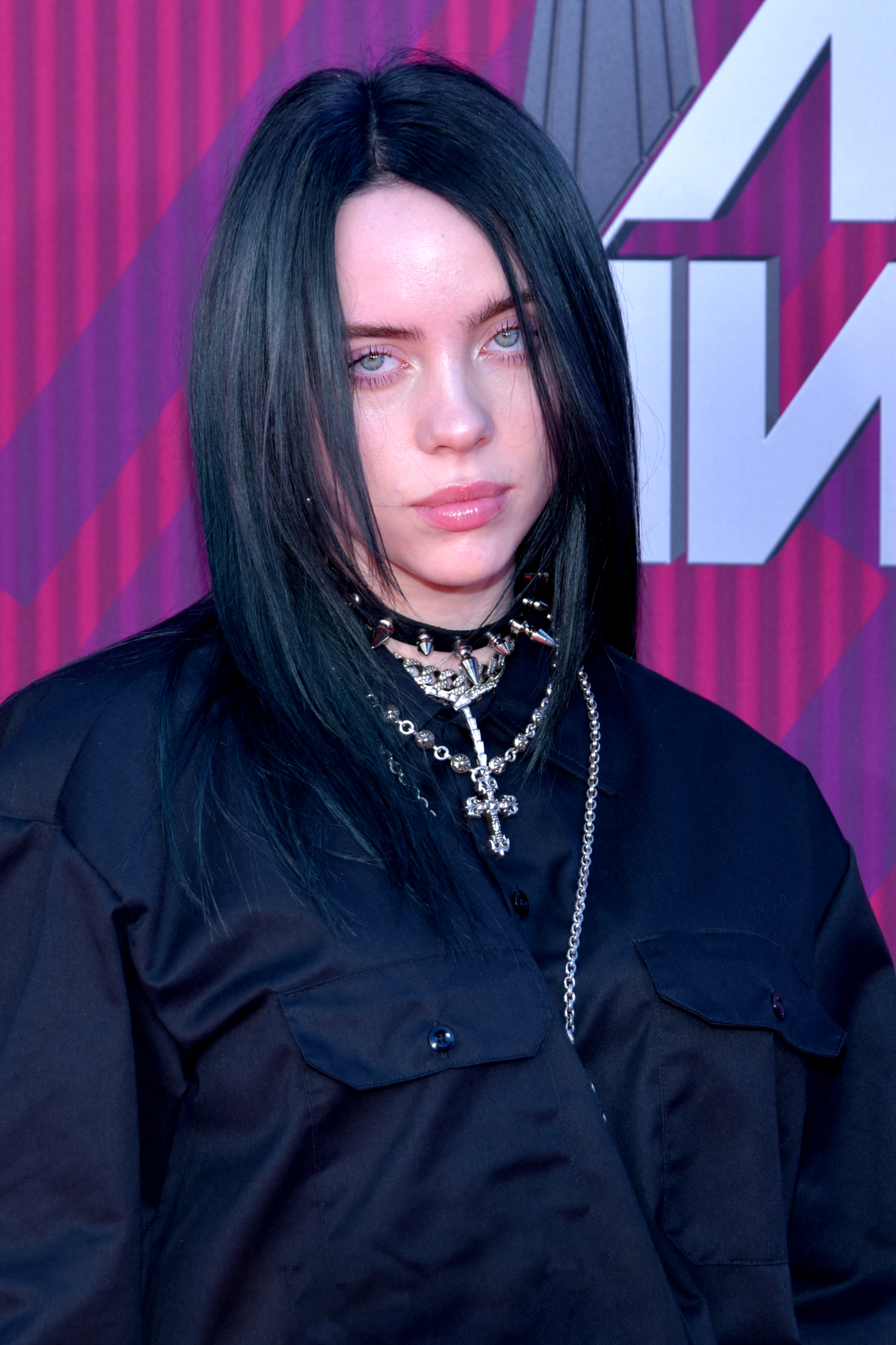
With "Bad Guy", Billie Eilish (pictured) became the first artist born in the 21st century to have a number-one song on the Canadian Hot 100 and the youngest since Lorde in 2013 to top the chart.

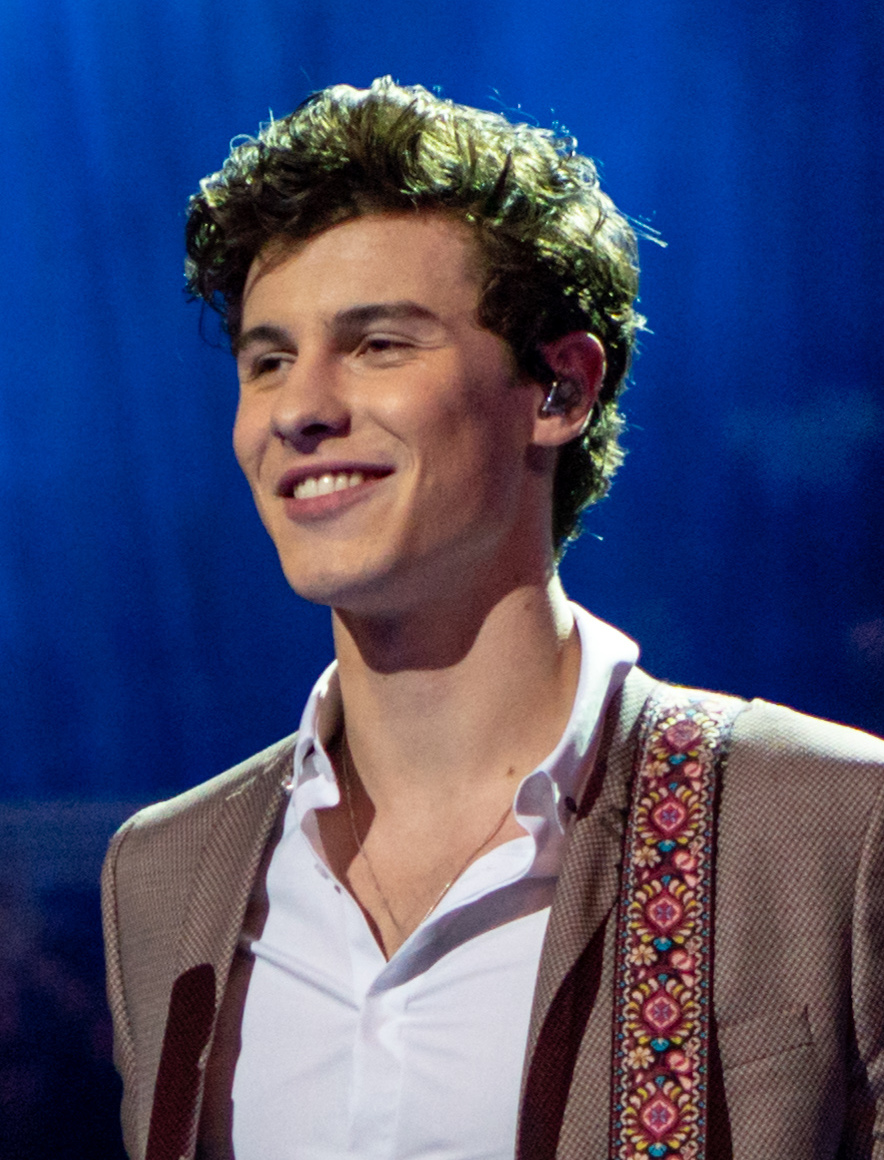
Canadian singer Shawn Mendes (pictured) earned his first number-one single with "Señorita", a duet with Camila Cabello, which spent seven weeks at number one.

Key
†	Indicates best-performing single of 2019

No.	Issue date	Song	Artist(s)	Ref.
135	January 5	"All I Want for Christmas Is You"	Mariah Carey	
re	January 12	"Thank U, Next"	Ariana Grande	
136	January 19	"Sunflower"	Post Malone and Swae Lee	
136	January 26	"Sunflower"	Post Malone and Swae Lee	
137	February 2	"7 Rings"	Ariana Grande	
137	February 9	"7 Rings"	Ariana Grande	
137	February 16	"7 Rings"	Ariana Grande	
137	February 23	"7 Rings"	Ariana Grande	
137	March 2	"7 Rings"	Ariana Grande	
138	March 9	"Shallow"	Lady Gaga and Bradley Cooper	
139	March 16	"Sucker"	Jonas Brothers	
re	March 23	"7 Rings"	Ariana Grande	
re	March 30	"7 Rings"	Ariana Grande	
re	April 6	"7 Rings"	Ariana Grande	
140	April 13	"Bad Guy"	Billie Eilish	
141	April 20	"Old Town Road" †	Lil Nas X featuring Billy Ray Cyrus	
141	April 27	"Old Town Road" †	Lil Nas X featuring Billy Ray Cyrus	
141	May 4	"Old Town Road" †	Lil Nas X featuring Billy Ray Cyrus	
141	May 11	"Old Town Road" †	Lil Nas X featuring Billy Ray Cyrus	
141	May 18	"Old Town Road" †	Lil Nas X featuring Billy Ray Cyrus	
141	May 25	"Old Town Road" †	Lil Nas X featuring Billy Ray Cyrus	
141	June 1	"Old Town Road" †	Lil Nas X featuring Billy Ray Cyrus	
141	June 8	"Old Town Road" †	Lil Nas X featuring Billy Ray Cyrus	
141	June 15	"Old Town Road" †	Lil Nas X featuring Billy Ray Cyrus	
141	June 22	"Old Town Road" †	Lil Nas X featuring Billy Ray Cyrus	
141	June 29	"Old Town Road" †	Lil Nas X featuring Billy Ray Cyrus	
141	July 6	"Old Town Road" †	Lil Nas X featuring Billy Ray Cyrus	
141	July 13	"Old Town Road" †	Lil Nas X featuring Billy Ray Cyrus	
141	July 20	"Old Town Road" †	Lil Nas X featuring Billy Ray Cyrus	
141	July 27	"Old Town Road" †	Lil Nas X featuring Billy Ray Cyrus	
141	August 3	"Old Town Road" †	Lil Nas X featuring Billy Ray Cyrus	
141	August 10	"Old Town Road" †	Lil Nas X featuring Billy Ray Cyrus	
141	August 17	"Old Town Road" †	Lil Nas X featuring Billy Ray Cyrus	
141	August 24	"Old Town Road" †	Lil Nas X featuring Billy Ray Cyrus	
142	August 31	"Señorita"	Shawn Mendes and Camila Cabello	
142	September 7	"Señorita"	Shawn Mendes and Camila Cabello	
142	September 14	"Señorita"	Shawn Mendes and Camila Cabello	
142	September 21	"Señorita"	Shawn Mendes and Camila Cabello	
142	September 28	"Señorita"	Shawn Mendes and Camila Cabello	
142	October 5	"Señorita"	Shawn Mendes and Camila Cabello	
142	October 12	"Señorita"	Shawn Mendes and Camila Cabello	
143	October 19	"Highest in the Room"	Travis Scott	
144	October 26	"Someone You Loved"	Lewis Capaldi	
144	November 2	"Someone You Loved"	Lewis Capaldi	
145	November 9	"Lose You to Love Me"	Selena Gomez	
re	November 16	"Someone You Loved"	Lewis Capaldi	
re	November 23	"Someone You Loved"	Lewis Capaldi	
146	November 30	"Dance Monkey"	Tones and I	
146	December 7	"Dance Monkey"	Tones and I	
146	December 14	"Dance Monkey"	Tones and I	
146	December 21	"Dance Monkey"	Tones and I	
146	December 28	"Dance Monkey"	Tones and I	

== See also ==
- List of number-one albums of 2019 (Canada)
