= X (Jonas Brothers song) =

2020 single by the Jonas Brothers featuring Karol G

Single by Jonas Brothers featuring Karol G
- Language: English; Spanish
- B-side: "Five More Minutes"
- Released: May 15, 2020
- Genre: Latin pop
- Length: 3:05
- Label: Republic
- Songwriters: Nicholas Jonas; Carolina Giraldo; Ryan Tedder; Shellback; Ali Tamposi
- Producer: Shellback

Jonas Brothers singles chronology
"What a Man Gotta Do" (2020)	"X" / "Five More Minutes" (2020)	"I Need You Christmas" (2020)

Karol G singles chronology
"Follow" (2020)	"X" (2020)	"La Vida Continuó" (2020)

Music video
- "X" on YouTube

"X" is a song by American pop rock group Jonas Brothers, featuring vocals from Colombian reggaeton singer-songwriter Karol G. It was released on May 15, 2020. The song was released concurrently with "Five More Minutes". Both of these songs are part of a conjoined single titled XV.

== Background ==
On May 11, 2020, the group announced the single "X" and announced that the release of the song would be on May 15, 2020. The singles "Five More Minutes" and "X" were both featured in their tour documentary called Happiness Continues: A Jonas Brothers Concert Film, which was released in April. During an interview with Insider, Kevin Jonas said "The new single 'X' is a song that I'm so excited about". He further explained the way he feels about the collaboration is reminiscent of how he felt about the band's hit 2019 track called "Sucker", which marked their musical comeback after a six-year hiatus. "I can honestly say there was only one other time where I had a song of ours constantly in my head", Jonas said. "It was 'Sucker' and 'What a Man Gotta Do,' but 'Sucker' specifically just kind of stayed there as kind of an earworm."

== Critical reception ==
Billboard's Jessica Roiz said that "X" is "true Jonas Brothers fashion, the tune is catchy dance-pop meshed with flairs of Latin-alt rumba".

== Music video ==
The music video released on May 18, 2020, and shows the band dancing, enjoying a beverage and playing instruments through individual phone screens against a white background. Karol G also appears on a fourth screen in an all-red ensemble as she sings her verse.

== Live performances ==
The Jonas Brothers with Karol G performed the song live for the first time on Graduate Together: America Honors the High School Class of 2020. Members of the class of 2020 appeared on video as the brothers' personal backup dance crew. The band performed the single live with Karol G during the eighteenth-season finale of The Voice on May 19, 2020. The Jonas Brothers performed "X" (without Karol G) along with "Sucker" and "What a Man Gotta Do" as exclusive 'home' sessions recorded especially for Radio 1's Big Weekend.

== Charts ==
=== Weekly charts ===
Weekly chart performance for "X"
Chart (2020)	Peak position
Belgium (Ultratop 50 Flanders)	19
Belgium (Ultratip Bubbling Under Wallonia)	9
Canada Hot 100 (Billboard)	42
Canada AC (Billboard)	29
Canada Hot AC (Billboard)	16
Canada CHR/Top 40 (Billboard)	15
CIS Airplay (TopHit)	2
Colombia (National-Report)	93
Czech Republic Airplay (ČNS IFPI)	52
Germany Airplay (BVMI)	4
Hungary (Rádiós Top 40)	22
Hungary (Single Top 40)	22
Ireland (IRMA)	71
Israel (Media Forest)	2
Lithuania (AGATA)	76
Mexico (Billboard Mexican Airplay)	26
Netherlands (Dutch Top 40)	9
Netherlands (Single Top 100)	28
New Zealand Hot Singles (RMNZ)	7
Panama (PRODUCE)	39
Poland Airplay (ZPAV)	8
Portugal (AFP)	155
Russia Airplay (TopHit)	1
Scottish Singles Sales (Official Charts)	47
Slovakia Airplay (ČNS IFPI)	12
Slovenia (SloTop50)	8
Suriname (Nationale Top 40)	2
Switzerland (Schweizer Hitparade)	79
UK Singles (Official Charts)	82
US Billboard Hot 100	33
US Adult Contemporary (Billboard)	26
US Adult Pop Airplay (Billboard)	15
US Pop Airplay (Billboard)	21
US Dance Airplay (Billboard)	35
US Rolling Stone Top 100	20

=== Year-end charts ===
Year-end chart performance for "X"
Chart (2020)	Position
Belgium (Ultratop Flanders)	80
CIS (Tophit)	37
Hungary (Rádiós Top 40)	79
Netherlands (Dutch Top 40)	33
Poland (ZPAV)	73
Romania (Airplay 100)	75
Russia Airplay (Tophit)	33

== Certifications ==
Certifications for "X"
Region	Certification	Certified units/sales
Brazil (Pro-Música Brasil)	Gold	20,000^{‡}
Canada (Music Canada)	Platinum	80,000^{‡}
Poland (ZPAV)	Gold	10,000^{‡}
^{‡} Sales+streaming figures based on certification alone.

== Release history ==
Release dates and formats for "X"
Region	Date	Formats	Label	Ref.
Various	May 15, 2020	Digital download; streaming	Republic	
United States	May 19, 2020	Contemporary hit radio	Republic	
Russia	May 22, 2020	Contemporary hit radio	Universal	
Italy	May 22, 2020	Contemporary hit radio	Universal	
