= Happiness Begins Tour =

2019–20 concert tour by the Jonas Brothers

- Tour by Jonas Brothers
- Promotional poster for the tour
- Location: Europe; North America
- Associated album: Happiness Begins
- Start date: August 7, 2019
- End date: February 22, 2020
- No. of shows: 92
- Supporting acts: Livvia; Jordan McGraw; Picture This; Bebe Rexha
- Attendance: 1.223 million
- Box office: $121.6 million

Jonas Brothers concert chronology
- Jonas Brothers Live 2013 (2013); Happiness Begins Tour (2019–2020); Remember This Tour (2021–2022)

Happiness Begins Tour was the tenth concert tour by the Jonas Brothers, in promotion of their fifth studio album, Happiness Begins (2019). The tour began on August 7, 2019, in Miami, Florida at the American Airlines Arena and concluded on February 22, 2020, in Paris, France at the AccorHotels Arena, marking the first tour since the band's break up in 2013.

== Background ==
On April 30, 2019, the band and venues teased the phrase "Happiness Begins tomorrow", hinting a tour. On May 1, 2019, the band officially announced their first major arena concert tour in ten years. Currently including 70 concerts in North America, 5 in Latin America, and 16 concerts in Europe. Bebe Rexha, Jordan McGraw, and Livvia are the opening acts in North America. On May 7, additional shows where added in Los Angeles, New York City, Toronto, and Chicago due to the high ticket demand. Due to overwhelming demand, on May 10, 23 additional were announced. On May 30, additional shows were added in Mexico City and Monterrey, due to high ticket demand.

On June 6, 2019, the band added an extra London date at Wembley Arena. On June 10, 2019, more shows were added in North American cities of Albany, University Park, Cincinnati and Birmingham, as well a second show in Inglewood due to overwhelming demand.

== Critical reception ==
The tour has received positive reviews. Patricia Cardenas, from the Miami New Times, called the Miami show "genuinely touching and personal" and "dynamic and poignant". Cardenas also stated how this tour was a way of "giving back to their adoring fans while saluting the band they built into an empire as teenagers on the Disney Channel." Brad Haynes, from radio station Mix 105.1, wrote for Orlando, "The Jonas Brothers have risen once again". Mady Dudley, from Creative Loafing, called the show in Tampa, "unfiltered". Dudley also stated, "A lot has changed, and the brothers are all grown up, but the innocence of their music and their legacy still lives on". John Moser, from the Morning Call, wrote for Philadelphia, complimenting each brother individually. Moser commented Nick's "mature" and "gusto" voice, and Joe's "powerful, distinctive delivery".

== Set list ==
This set list is from the concert on August 7, 2019, in Miami. It is not intended to represent all shows from the tour.

1. "Rollercoaster"
2. "S.O.S"
3. "Cool"
4. "Only Human"
5. "Strangers"
6. "That's Just the Way We Roll"
7. "Fly With Me"
8. "Used To Be"
9. "Hesitate"
10. "Can't Have You" (fan request)
11. "Jealous"
12. "Cake by the Ocean"
13. "Comeback"
14. "When You Look Me in the Eyes"
15. "I Believe"
16. "Mandy" / "Paranoid" / "Got Me Going Crazy" / "Play My Music" / "World War III" / "Hold On" / "Tonight"
17. "Lovebug"
18. "Year 3000"

Encore

19. "Burnin' Up"
20. "Sucker"

=== Notes ===
- During the show in Miami, the Jonas Brothers were joined by Sebastián Yatra, Daddy Yankee and Natti Natasha in a surprise performance of "Runaway".
- During the show in Albany, the show started with "Burnin' Up" before performing "Rollercoaster" due to venue restrictions prohibiting the usual entrance.
- During the first show in Toronto, "Burnin Up" and "Sucker" were not performed due to unforeseen technical difficulties.
- During the show in Hershey, the Jonas Brothers were joined by John Taylor & Greg Garbowsky in a surprise performance of "Lovebug" and by Big Rob in a surprise performance of "Burnin' Up".
- During the show in Nashville, the Jonas Brothers were joined by Dan + Shay in a surprise performance of their song "Tequila".
- During the show in Anaheim only, the Jonas Brothers performed "Don't Throw It Away" instead of "Strangers".
- During the show in Los Angeles, the Jonas Brothers were again joined by Big Rob in the performance of "Burnin' Up".
- On November 19 and from November 29 to December 15, 2019 Like It's Christmas was added preceding the fan request, Mandy's Megamix and also both directly preceding and following Fly with Me
- Beginning with the January 29, 2020, show in Birmingham, "What a Man Gotta Do" was added to the set list.

=== Fan requests ===
The following songs were performed in place of "Can't Have You".

- During the first show in Orlando, "Jersey" and "Gotta Find You".
- During the shows in Tampa, Birmingham and Milwaukee, "Take a Breath".
- During the show in Kansas City, "Games".
- During the show in Philadelphia, "Pushin' Me Away".
- During the show in Albany, "Turn Right" and "Just Friends".
- During the show in Buffalo, "A Little Bit Longer".
- During the show in Atlanta, the first show in New York City, the show in Indianapolis, the show in Portland and the second show in Orlando, "Please Be Mine".
- During the second show in New York City and the show in New Orleans, "Goodnight and Goodbye".
- During the show in Pittsburgh, "Hello Beautiful".
- During the show in Columbus, "Turn Right".
- During the show in Detroit, the second show in Los Angeles, and the first show in Chicago, "Just Friends".
- During the show in Nashville, "Jersey".
- During the show in St. Louis, "Hollywood".
- During the show in Tulsa "Feelin' Alive".
- During the first show in Toronto and the show in Saint Paul, "Sorry".
- During the show in Houston, "Who I Am".
- During the show in Uncasville, the show in Phoenix, the show in Las Vegas and the show in Monterrey "Still In Love With You".
- During the second show in Mexico City and the show in Charlotte, "Don't Speak".

== Tour dates ==
List of concerts, showing date, city, country, venue, opening acts, attendance (tickets sold / total available) and gross revenue
Date	City	Country	Venue	Opening acts	Attendance (tickets sold / total available)	Revenue
August 7, 2019	Miami	United States	American Airlines Arena	Bebe Rexha; Jordan McGraw	14,333 / 14,333	$1,772,340
August 9, 2019	Orlando	United States	Amway Center	Bebe Rexha; Jordan McGraw	14,090 / 14,090	$1,719,309
August 10, 2019	Tampa	United States	Amalie Arena	Bebe Rexha; Jordan McGraw	15,433 / 15,433	$1,809,942
August 12, 2019	Atlanta	United States	State Farm Arena	Jordan McGraw	12,347 / 12,347	$1,541,154
August 14, 2019	Raleigh	United States	PNC Arena	Bebe Rexha; Jordan McGraw	14,869 / 14,869	$1,688,854
August 15, 2019	Washington, D.C.	United States	Capital One Arena	Bebe Rexha; Jordan McGraw	15,459 / 15,459	$1,901,704
August 17, 2019	Boston	United States	TD Garden	Bebe Rexha; Jordan McGraw	13,587 / 13,587	$1,831,061
August 18, 2019	Philadelphia	United States	Wells Fargo Center	Bebe Rexha; Jordan McGraw	15,898 / 15,898	$1,912,761
August 19, 2019	Albany	United States	Times Union Center	Bebe Rexha; Jordan McGraw	11,513 / 11,513	$956,436
August 21, 2019	Uncasville	United States	Mohegan Sun Arena	Bebe Rexha; Jordan McGraw	6,969 / 6,969	$1,008,994
August 23, 2019	Toronto	Canada	Scotiabank Arena	Bebe Rexha; Jordan McGraw	30,140 / 30,140	$2,817,833
August 24, 2019	Toronto	Canada	Scotiabank Arena	Bebe Rexha; Jordan McGraw	30,140 / 30,140	$2,817,833
August 27, 2019	Buffalo	United States	KeyBank Center	Bebe Rexha; Jordan McGraw	13,631 / 13,631	$1,251,856
August 29, 2019	New York City	United States	Madison Square Garden	Bebe Rexha; Jordan McGraw	29,812 / 29,812	$5,210,049
August 30, 2019	New York City	United States	Madison Square Garden	Bebe Rexha; Jordan McGraw	29,812 / 29,812	$5,210,049
August 31, 2019	Hershey	United States	Hersheypark Stadium	Bebe Rexha; Jordan McGraw	31,090 / 31,090	$2,438,416
September 3, 2019	Pittsburgh	United States	PPG Paints Arena	Bebe Rexha; Jordan McGraw	15,091 / 15,091	$1,484,750
September 4, 2019	University Park	United States	Bryce Jordan Center	Bebe Rexha; Jordan McGraw	12,481 / 12,481	$902,967
September 5, 2019	Columbus	United States	Schottenstein Center	Bebe Rexha; Jordan McGraw	14,797 / 14,797	$1,347,078
September 7, 2019	Detroit	United States	Little Caesars Arena	Bebe Rexha; Jordan McGraw	15,288 / 15,288	$1,732,030
September 8, 2019	Grand Rapids	United States	Van Andel Arena	Bebe Rexha; Jordan McGraw	11,209 / 11,209	$1,222,917
September 10, 2019	Nashville	United States	Bridgestone Arena	Bebe Rexha; Jordan McGraw	14,399 / 14,399	$1,513,821
September 11, 2019	Cincinnati	United States	U.S. Bank Arena	Bebe Rexha; Jordan McGraw	12,272 / 12,272	$1,000,782
September 13, 2019	Indianapolis	United States	Bankers Life Fieldhouse	Bebe Rexha; Jordan McGraw	14,995 / 14,995	$1,501,164
September 14, 2019	St. Louis	United States	Enterprise Center	Bebe Rexha; Jordan McGraw	15,247 / 15,247	$1,629,711
September 16, 2019	Saint Paul	United States	Xcel Energy Center	Bebe Rexha; Jordan McGraw	15,060 / 15,060	$1,618,600
September 17, 2019	Milwaukee	United States	Fiserv Forum	Bebe Rexha; Jordan McGraw	12,858 / 12,858	$1,284,819
September 19, 2019	Chicago	United States	United Center	Bebe Rexha; Jordan McGraw	30,605 / 30,605	$3,426,657
September 20, 2019	Chicago	United States	United Center	Bebe Rexha; Jordan McGraw	30,605 / 30,605	$3,426,657
September 22, 2019	Kansas City	United States	Sprint Center	Bebe Rexha; Jordan McGraw	14,354 / 14,354	$1,460,307
September 25, 2019	Dallas	United States	American Airlines Center	Jordan McGraw; Livvia (Note: Due to her appearance at Rock in Rio, Bebe Rexha couldn't perform at the September 25, 26, and 27, 2019 concerts. Livvia was the replacement act.)	13,947 / 14,665	$1,865,751
September 26, 2019	Houston	United States	Toyota Center	Jordan McGraw; Livvia	12,989 / 12,989	$1,544,747
September 27, 2019	San Antonio	United States	AT&T Center	Jordan McGraw; Livvia	15,795 / 15,795	$1,869,974
September 29, 2019	Tulsa	United States	BOK Center	Bebe Rexha; Jordan McGraw	14,062 / 14,062	$1,420,089
October 1, 2019	Denver	United States	Pepsi Center	Bebe Rexha; Jordan McGraw	14,179 / 14,179	$1,408,938
October 3, 2019	Salt Lake City	United States	Vivint Smart Home Arena	Bebe Rexha; Jordan McGraw	13,616 / 13,616	$1,273,759
October 5, 2019	Phoenix	United States	Talking Stick Resort Arena	Bebe Rexha; Jordan McGraw	14,450 / 14,450	$1,758,885
October 6, 2019	Anaheim	United States	Honda Center	Bebe Rexha; Jordan McGraw	13,836 / 13,836	$1,812,100
October 8, 2019	San Francisco	United States	Chase Center	Bebe Rexha; Jordan McGraw	13,176 / 13,176	$1,589,203
October 11, 2019	Vancouver	Canada	Rogers Arena	Bebe Rexha; Jordan McGraw	14,721 / 14,721	$1,240,500
October 12, 2019	Tacoma	United States	Tacoma Dome	Bebe Rexha; Jordan McGraw	18,848 / 18,848	$1,851,458
October 13, 2019	Portland	United States	Moda Center	Bebe Rexha; Jordan McGraw	14,604 / 14,604	$1,452,665
October 15, 2019	Sacramento	United States	Golden 1 Center	Bebe Rexha; Jordan McGraw	14,919 / 14,919	$1,645,340
October 17, 2019	San Diego	United States	Pechanga Arena	Bebe Rexha; Jordan McGraw	11,615 / 11,615	$1,230,339
October 18, 2019	Las Vegas	United States	MGM Grand Garden Arena	Bebe Rexha; Jordan McGraw	11,797 / 11,797	$1,315,608
October 20, 2019	Los Angeles	United States	Hollywood Bowl	Bebe Rexha; Jordan McGraw	34,038 / 34,038	$3,660,865
October 21, 2019	Los Angeles	United States	Hollywood Bowl	Bebe Rexha; Jordan McGraw	34,038 / 34,038	$3,660,865
October 27, 2019	Monterrey	Mexico	Auditorio Citibanamex	Jordan McGraw	13,150 / 13,150	$1,312,877
October 28, 2019	Monterrey	Mexico	Auditorio Citibanamex	Jordan McGraw	13,150 / 13,150	$1,312,877
October 30, 2019	Mexico City	Mexico	Palacio de los Deportes	Jordan McGraw	31,579 / 32,704	$2,455,062
October 31, 2019	Mexico City	Mexico	Palacio de los Deportes	Jordan McGraw	31,579 / 32,704	$2,455,062
November 2, 2019	Guadalajara	Mexico	Arena VFG (Note: The concert on November 2, 2019 in Guadalajara was relocated to Arena VFG from Auditorio Telmex due to high demand.)	Jordan McGraw	11,256 / 11,256	$929,643
November 12, 2019	New Orleans	United States	Smoothie King Center	Bebe Rexha; Jordan McGraw	13,370 / 13,370	$1,486,057
November 13, 2019	Birmingham	United States	Legacy Arena	Bebe Rexha; Jordan McGraw	13,268 / 13,268	$1,247,963
November 15, 2019	Sunrise	United States	BB&T Center	Bebe Rexha; Jordan McGraw	13,280 / 13,280	$1,361,603
November 16, 2019	Orlando	United States	Amway Center	Bebe Rexha; Jordan McGraw	13,302 / 13,302	$1,403,973
November 17, 2019	Jacksonville	United States	VyStar Veterans Memorial Arena	Bebe Rexha; Jordan McGraw	11,005 / 11,005	$1,002,601
November 19, 2019	Duluth	United States	Infinite Energy Arena	Bebe Rexha; Jordan McGraw	10,621 / 10,621	$941,081
November 20, 2019	Charlotte	United States	Spectrum Center	Bebe Rexha; Jordan McGraw	15,547 / 15,547	$1,466,857
November 22, 2019	Newark	United States	Prudential Center	Bebe Rexha; Jordan McGraw	14,409 / 14,409	$2,005,591
November 23, 2019	Brooklyn	United States	Barclays Center	Bebe Rexha; Jordan McGraw	15,167 / 15,167	$2,146,529
November 24, 2019	Boston	United States	TD Garden	Bebe Rexha; Jordan McGraw	14,944 / 14,961	$1,831,948
November 26, 2019	Toronto	Canada	Scotiabank Arena	Bebe Rexha; Jordan McGraw	12,803 / 12,803	$960,019
November 27, 2019	Montreal	Canada	Bell Centre	Bebe Rexha; Jordan McGraw	9,311 / 10,827	$826,414
November 29, 2019	Atlantic City	United States	Boardwalk Hall	Bebe Rexha; Jordan McGraw	13,215 / 13,215	$1,662,047
November 30, 2019	Baltimore	United States	Royal Farms Arena	Bebe Rexha; Jordan McGraw	12,289 / 12,289	$1,379,531
December 3, 2019	Rosemont	United States	Allstate Arena	Bebe Rexha; Jordan McGraw	14,106 / 14,106	$1,332,153
December 4, 2019	Omaha	United States	CHI Health Center Omaha	Bebe Rexha; Jordan McGraw	13,962 / 13,962	$1,065,368
December 6, 2019	Dallas	United States	American Airlines Center	Bebe Rexha; Jordan McGraw	15,026 / 15,026	$1,683,174
December 7, 2019	Austin	United States	Frank Erwin Center	Bebe Rexha; Jordan McGraw	12,371 / 12.371	$1,265,499
December 10, 2019	Phoenix	United States	Talking Stick Resort Arena	Bebe Rexha; Jordan McGraw	13,215 / 13,215	$1,224,904
December 12, 2019	Oakland	United States	Oakland Arena	Bebe Rexha; Jordan McGraw	13,954 / 13,954	$1,152,462
December 14, 2019	Inglewood	United States	The Forum	Bebe Rexha; Jordan McGraw	29,568 / 29,568	$2,809,871
December 15, 2019	Inglewood	United States	The Forum	Bebe Rexha; Jordan McGraw	29,568 / 29,568	$2,809,871
January 29, 2020	Birmingham	England	Arena Birmingham	Jordan McGraw; Picture This; Livvia	11,497 / 11,497	$864,509
January 31, 2020	Dublin	Ireland	3Arena	Jordan McGraw; Picture This; Livvia	12,465 / 12,465	$875,213
February 2, 2020	London	England	The O_{2} Arena	Jordan McGraw; Picture This; Livvia	15,703 / 15,703	$1,257,730
February 3, 2020	London	England	Wembley Arena	Jordan McGraw; Picture This; Livvia	8,083 / 8,124	$666,136
February 5, 2020	Glasgow	Scotland	SSE Hydro	Jordan McGraw; Picture This; Livvia	11,166 / 11,166	$802,147
February 6, 2020	Manchester	England	Manchester Arena	Jordan McGraw; Picture This; Livvia	13,809 / 13,809	$1,049,180
February 8, 2020	Antwerp	Belgium	Lotto Arena	Jordan McGraw; Picture This	6,264 / 6,264	$400,592
February 10, 2020	Berlin	Germany	Mercedes-Benz Arena	Jordan McGraw; Picture This	N/A	N/A
February 11, 2020	Cologne	Germany	Lanxess Arena	Jordan McGraw; Picture This	14,762 / 14,762	$682,867
February 13, 2020	Zürich	Switzerland	Hallenstadion	Jordan McGraw; Picture This	7,281 / 7,281	$398,267
February 14, 2020	Milan	Italy	Mediolanum Forum	Jordan McGraw; Picture This	11,445 / 11,445	$593,472
February 16, 2020	Madrid	Spain	WiZink Center	Jordan McGraw; Picture This	13,829 / 13,829	$922,752
February 17, 2020	Barcelona	Spain	Palau Sant Jordi	Jordan McGraw; Picture This	8,961 / 8,961	$608,231
February 18, 2020	Montpellier	France	Sud de France Arena	Jordan McGraw; Picture This	N/A	N/A
February 20, 2020	Amsterdam	Netherlands	Ziggo Dome	Jordan McGraw; Picture This	15,213 / 15,213	$854,574
February 22, 2020	Paris	France	AccorHotels Arena	Jordan McGraw; Picture This	14,764 / 14,764	$1,132,237
