= Only Human (Jonas Brothers song) =

2019 single by Jonas Brothers

Single by Jonas Brothers

from the album Happiness Begins
- Released: July 2, 2019
- Genre: Reggae-pop
- Length: 3:03
- Label: Republic
- Songwriters: Nicholas Jonas; Joseph Jonas; Kevin Jonas II; Johan Schuster
- Producer: Shellback

Jonas Brothers singles chronology
"Runaway" (2019)	"Only Human" (2019)	"Lonely" (2019)

Music video
- "Only Human" on YouTube

"Only Human" is a song by American pop rock group the Jonas Brothers from their fifth studio album, Happiness Begins (2019). It was released as the third and final single from the album on July 2, 2019, by Republic Records. The group co-wrote the song with its producer Shellback. "Only Human" is a reggae-pop song that features twinkling keys, groovy bass, brass, and percussive cadences in its production.

Upon release, "Only Human" was met with generally favorable reviews from music critics, who praised its music style and "textured" production. Commercially, the song peaked at number 18 on both the US Billboard Hot 100 and the Canadian Hot 100. The song reached the top 40 on charts in numerous territories, including Australia, Hungary, Ireland, the Netherlands, New Zealand, Spain, and the Flanders and Wallonia regions of Belgium. It was certified gold in Belgium, platinum in France, and quadruple platinum in Canada.

An accompanying '80s-themed music video directed by Anthony Mandler was released on August 13, 2019. It depicts the Jonas Brothers singing and dancing in a crowded nightclub. To promote the song, the Jonas Brothers performed "Only Human" on several occasions and also included it on the set list for their Happiness Begins Tour (2019–2020).

== Background and composition ==
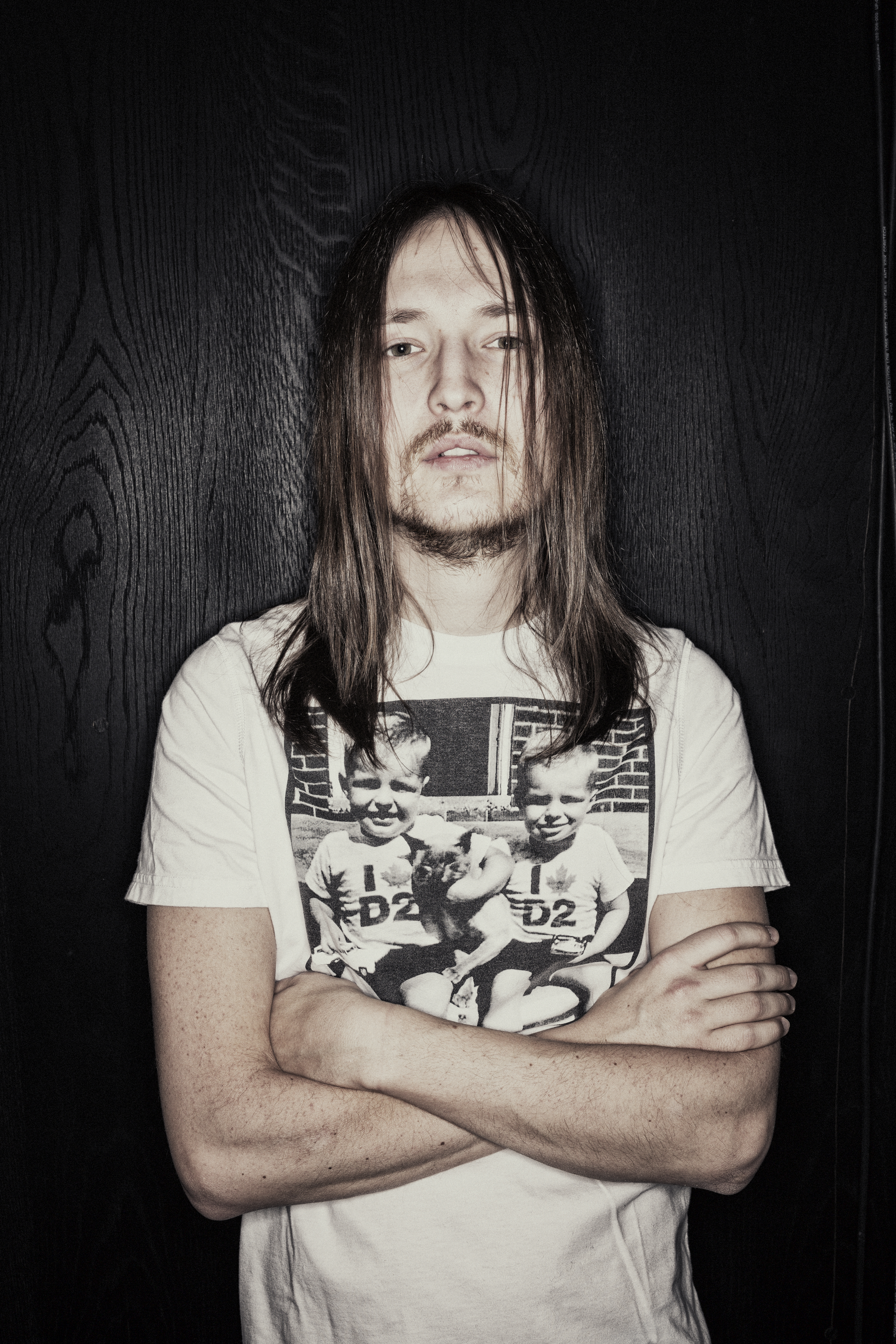
Shellback (pictured in 2015) co-wrote and produced the song.

Following the success of the singles "Sucker" and "Cool", "Only Human" was serviced to the US contemporary hit radio format by Republic Records, on July 2, 2019, as the third single from the Jonas Brothers' fifth studio album Happiness Begins. On July 5, it was released to Italy's contemporary hit radio. The group wrote "Only Human" with its producer Shellback. Shellback also played bass guitar, drums, keyboards, and tambourines. It was mixed by Serban Ghenea and John Hanes, who also served as studio personnel. "Only Human" was the last song written for Happiness Begins after the album's songwriters and producers Max Martin and Shellback approached the band. During an interview with Apple Music, Joe Jonas recalled writing and recording the track mostly via FaceTime.

"Only Human" is a reggae-pop song featuring an '80s tropical groove and lasts for three minutes and three seconds. Its production includes "twinkling keys", "groovy bass line", brass and percussive cadences. In terms of musical notation, the song is composed in 4/4 time and the key of D minor at moderately slow tempo varying between 92 and 96 beats per minute. The band's vocals span a range of G_{4} to D_{6}. Lyrically, the song is about the "only human" instinct to "having harmless fun": "It's only human, you know that it's real / So why would you fight or try to deny the way that you feel?", urging the listeners to stop thinking about anything else and just dance.

== Reception ==
Upon release, "Only Human" was met with generally favorable reviews from music critics. In a positive review, Olivia Horn of Pitchfork praised the composition of the song, noting that "the reggae beat [...] works surprisingly well". Chloe Gilke of Uproxx wrote that the "textured" production was like a "perfectly-fit puzzle" and deemed the song as an album highlight. Christopher Thiessen of Consequence of Sound criticized the lyrical content and wrote that "the sincerity in performance and deep devotion to melody-crafting" made up for it. Billboard magazine ranked it 40th on their 2019 year-end list.

"Only Human" peaked at number 18 on both the US Billboard Hot 100 and the Canadian Hot 100. The song debuted atop the Canada Hot AC chart and charted on the Canada AC chart at number 11. In addition, the song peaked at number three on the Billboard Pop Songs and Adult Pop Songs charts. It also entered the US Adult Contemporary chart at number 10 and Dance/Mix Show Airplay at number 12. The song charted at number 38 in Australia, number 64 in the UK, number four in Spain and number ten in both the Flanders and Wallonia regions of Belgium. In Europe, the song impacted the airplay charts in numerous territories, reaching top ten peaks in Germany, Netherlands, Poland, Romania and Slovakia. It was certified gold in Belgium, platinum in France and quadruple platinum in Canada.

== Promotion and music video ==
An accompanying music video was uploaded to Jonas Brothers' official YouTube channel on August 13, 2019. The '80s-themed video was directed by Anthony Mandler and produced by Kim Bradshaw of Black Hand Cinema. The music video was filmed in New York City. The visual opens inside a nightclub having a giant disco-ball and ceramic horse statues where the Jonas Brothers are performing on stage wearing opaque sunglasses and colorful retro outfits alongside professional ladder dancer Declan McDonough. They are surrounded by a crowd of enthusiastic club-goers who are "head-bopping", "finger-snapping" and singing along to the group. The clip is interspersed with grainy footage of the group playing with rotary telephones and synchronized dancing of the audience beneath the neon disco lights. Over the course of the video, the brothers and the crowd take to the streets where Joe Jonas dances and sings, standing on top of a vintage yellow NYC taxi. The entire video alternates between filmy, hazy filtered shots at the club and the street. The final scene sees the driver of the cab shouting at them for blocking the traffic. Katrina Rees of Celemix praised the video's "nostalgic take on a classic era", which she felt "fit[ted] in perfectly with the old school vibe of the song."

The Jonas Brothers performed "Only Human" for the first time on The Tonight Show Starring Jimmy Fallon on June 13, 2019. On July 18, 2019, they performed the song on Late Night with Seth Meyers. On August 26, 2019, the band performed the song at the 2019 MTV Video Music Awards, which marked their first performance at the awards show in 10 years. They performed the song again on October 8, 2019, on The Ellen Show. "Only Human" was included in the set list of the band's tenth concert tour Happiness Begins Tour (2019–2020).

== Credits and personnel ==
Credits are adapted from Tidal.

- Nick Jonas – vocals, songwriter
- Joe Jonas – vocals, songwriter
- Kevin Jonas – vocals, songwriter
- Shellback – backing vocals, producer, songwriter, programmer, bass guitar, drums, keyboards, tambourine
- Peter Karlsson – vocal producer
- Michael Engström – bass guitar
- Wojtek Goral – alto saxophone, flute
- Tomas Jonsson – baritone saxophone, tenor saxophone
- Mattias Bylund – bassoon, horn
- Mia Samuelsson – flugelhorn
- Nils-Petter Ankarblom – horn, horn arranger
- Jason McNab – tambourine
- Jimmy Carr – tambourine
- Kasper Komar – tambourine
- Robert Mollard – tambourine
- Peter Noos Johansson – trombone
- Janne Bjerger – trumpet
- Magnus Johansson – trumpet
- Serban Ghenea – mixer
- John Hanes – mix engineer

== Charts ==
=== Weekly charts ===
Chart (2019–2020)	Peak position
Australia (ARIA)	38
Belgium (Ultratop 50 Flanders)	10
Belgium (Ultratop 50 Wallonia)	10
Canada Hot 100 (Billboard)	18
Canada AC (Billboard)	11
Canada CHR/Top 40 (Billboard)	4
Canada Hot AC (Billboard)	1
China Airplay/FL (Billboard)	27
Czech Republic Airplay (ČNS IFPI)	1
Czech Republic Singles Digital (ČNS IFPI)	40
Estonia (Eesti Ekspress)	31
France (SNEP)	97
Germany (Airplay Chart)	8
Hungary (Editors' Choice Top 40)	32
Hungary (Single Top 40)	35
Hungary (Stream Top 40)	18
Ireland (IRMA)	30
Latvia (LAIPA)	28
Lithuania (AGATA)	20
Mexico Airplay (Billboard)	12
Mexico Ingles Airplay (Billboard)	2
Netherlands (Dutch Top 40)	8
Netherlands (Single Top 100)	35
New Zealand (Recorded Music NZ)	35
Poland Airplay (ZPAV)	2
Portugal (AFP)	67
Puerto Rico (Monitor Latino)	10
Romania (Airplay 100)	4
San Marino (SMRRTV Top 50)	45
Scottish Singles Sales (Official Charts)	84
Slovakia Airplay (ČNS IFPI)	6
Slovakia Singles Digital (ČNS IFPI)	26
Slovenia (SloTop50)	9
Spain (Promusicae)	24
Sweden (Sverigetopplistan)	92
Switzerland (Schweizer Hitparade)	48
UK Singles (Official Charts)	64
US Billboard Hot 100	18
US Adult Contemporary (Billboard)	7
US Adult Pop Airplay (Billboard)	3
US Dance Airplay (Billboard)	12
US Pop Airplay (Billboard)	3
US Rolling Stone Top 100	51

=== Year-end charts ===
Chart (2019)	Position
Belgium (Ultratop Flanders)	52
Canada (Canadian Hot 100)	67
Netherlands (Dutch Top 40)	36
Poland (ZPAV)	27
US Billboard Hot 100	78
US Adult Top 40 (Billboard)	28
US Mainstream Top 40 (Billboard)	27

Chart (2020)	Position
Romania (Airplay 100)	6
US Billboard Hot 100	77
US Adult Contemporary (Billboard)	11
US Adult Top 40 (Billboard)	16
US Mainstream Top 40 (Billboard)	36

== Certifications ==
Region	Certification	Certified units/sales
Australia (ARIA)	2× Platinum	140,000^{‡}
Belgium (BRMA)	Gold	20,000^{‡}
Brazil (Pro-Música Brasil)	Platinum	40,000^{‡}
Canada (Music Canada)	5× Platinum	400,000^{‡}
Denmark (IFPI Danmark)	Gold	45,000^{‡}
France (SNEP)	Diamond	333,333^{‡}
Italy (FIMI)	Gold	35,000^{‡}
New Zealand (RMNZ)	2× Platinum	60,000^{‡}
Poland (ZPAV)	Platinum	50,000^{‡}
Portugal (AFP)	Gold	5,000^{‡}
Spain (Promusicae)	Platinum	60,000^{‡}
United Kingdom (BPI)	Silver	200,000^{‡}
United States (RIAA)	2× Platinum	2,000,000^{‡}
^{‡} Sales+streaming figures based on certification alone.

== Release history ==
Country	Date	Format	Label	Ref.
United States	July 2, 2019	Contemporary hit radio	Republic	
Italy	July 5, 2019	Contemporary hit radio	Republic	
