= What a Man Gotta Do =

2020 single by Jonas Brothers

Single by Jonas Brothers
- Released: January 17, 2020
- Length: 3:00
- Label: Republic
- Songwriters: Nicholas Jonas; Joseph Jonas; Kevin Jonas II; Ryan Tedder; David Stewart; Jessica Agombar
- Producers: Tedder; Stewart

Jonas Brothers singles chronology
"Like It's Christmas" (2019)	"What a Man Gotta Do" (2020)	"X" / "Five More Minutes" (2020)

Music video
- "What a Man Gotta Do" on YouTube

"What a Man Gotta Do" is a song by American group Jonas Brothers. It was released as a single through Republic Records on January 17, 2020. All three of the Jonas Brothers members, Nick, Joe, and Kevin Jonas, wrote the song with producers Ryan Tedder and David Stewart, alongside Jess Agombar.

== Background ==
The group announced the song's name and release date on January 13, 2020, through social media. They promoted the song the next day through a scratch card on Spotify.

The piece is set in the key of E major in a moderate 4/4 beat. The vocal range of the brothers span two whole octaves from E^{3} to E^{5}.

== Critical reception ==
Peggy Sirota for Billboard described the song as a "catchy, toe-tapping" song accompanied by an "equally heart-melting music video".

== Music video ==
After several days of teasing, the group released the song alongside a video in which they recreate three well-known eighties films. In the rollout to the visual's Friday, January 17, 2020, release, hints about the video's themes were revealed via retro movie posters mirroring classic late seventies and eighties films. The music video was directed by Joseph Kahn.

=== Synopsis ===
The clip stars Nick Jonas and Priyanka Chopra Jonas recreating the dancing-half-naked-in-the-living-room scene from Risky Business, Joe Jonas and Sophie Turner playing Danny and Sandy and then Cha-Cha at the school dance from Grease, and Kevin Jonas holding a boombox outside his wife Danielle's bedroom window in homage to the scene from Say Anything... The video features also a cameo from actor Matthew Modine.

=== Vegas Ride ===
An alternate video was released on January 21, 2020, in which the brothers ride around Las Vegas looking at the attractions.

== Live performances ==
On January 25, 2020, the group performed the song live for the first time at the Hollywood Palladium during the Citi Sound Vault. They also performed the song live during the 62nd Annual Grammy Awards as well as a previous unreleased track called, "Five More Minutes". They performed the song live during the first show of their European leg of the Happiness Begins Tour. On February 7, 2020, they performed the song on BBC's The One Show. On February 12, 2020, just like their March 2019 number-one song, "Sucker", they performed the song live on The Late Late Show with James Corden. The Jonas Brothers performed the song along "X" (without Karol G) and "Sucker" as Exclusive 'home' sessions recorded especially for Radio 1's Big Weekend.

== Charts ==
=== Weekly charts ===
Chart (2020)	Peak position
Australia (ARIA)	22
Austria (Ö3 Austria Top 40)	33
Belgium (Ultratop 50 Flanders)	21
Belgium (Ultratop 50 Wallonia)	14
Bolivia (Monitor Latino)	13
Canada Hot 100 (Billboard)	19
Canada AC (Billboard)	24
Canada CHR/Top 40 (Billboard)	9
Canada Hot AC (Billboard)	8
CIS Airplay (TopHit)	26
Croatia (HRT)	23
Czech Republic Singles Digital (ČNS IFPI)	23
Ecuador (National-Report)	27
Estonia (Eesti Tipp-40)	35
Euro Digital Song Sales (Billboard)	8
France (SNEP)	152
Germany (GfK)	67
Hungary (Rádiós Top 40)	10
Hungary (Single Top 40)	18
Hungary (Stream Top 40)	24
Iceland (Tónlistinn)	25
Ireland (IRMA)	18
Israel (Media Forest)	5
Japan Hot Overseas (Billboard)	11
Mexico Airplay (Billboard)	27
Netherlands (Dutch Top 40)	9
Netherlands (Single Top 100)	37
New Zealand (Recorded Music NZ)	31
Panama (Monitor Latino)	14
Poland Airplay (ZPAV)	16
Portugal (AFP)	73
Russia Airplay (TopHit)	15
Scottish Singles Sales (Official Charts)	4
Singapore (RIAS)	30
Slovakia Airplay (ČNS IFPI)	4
Slovakia Singles Digital (ČNS IFPI)	34
Slovenia (SloTop50)	33
Sweden (Sverigetopplistan)	64
Switzerland (Schweizer Hitparade)	33
UK Singles (Official Charts)	22
US Billboard Hot 100	16
US Adult Contemporary (Billboard)	21
US Adult Pop Airplay (Billboard)	11
US Pop Airplay (Billboard)	14
US Dance Airplay (Billboard)	30
US Rolling Stone Top 100	22

=== Year-end charts ===
Chart (2020)	Position
Australia (ARIA)	54
Belgium (Ultratop Flanders)	50
Belgium (Ultratop Wallonia)	76
Canada (Canadian Hot 100)	64
CIS (Tophit)	180
Hungary (Rádiós Top 40)	52
Netherlands (Dutch Top 40)	47
Russia Airplay (Tophit)	174
UK Singles (OCC)	87
US Adult Contemporary (Billboard)	50
US Adult Top 40 (Billboard)	38

== Certifications ==
Region	Certification	Certified units/sales
Australia (ARIA)	Platinum	70,000^{‡}
Belgium (BRMA)	Gold	20,000^{‡}
Brazil (Pro-Música Brasil)	Platinum	40,000^{‡}
Canada (Music Canada)	4× Platinum	320,000^{‡}
Denmark (IFPI Danmark)	Platinum	90,000^{‡}
New Zealand (RMNZ)	2× Platinum	60,000^{‡}
Poland (ZPAV)	Gold	10,000^{‡}
Portugal (AFP)	Gold	5,000^{‡}
Spain (Promusicae)	Gold	30,000^{‡}
United Kingdom (BPI)	Platinum	600,000^{‡}
United States (RIAA)	2× Platinum	2,000,000^{‡}
^{‡} Sales+streaming figures based on certification alone.

== Release history ==
Region	Date	Format	Label	Ref.
Various	January 17, 2020	Digital download; streaming	Republic	
Australia	January 17, 2020	Contemporary hit radio	Universal	
United Kingdom	January 18, 2020	Contemporary hit radio	Island	
United States	January 20, 2020	Hot/Modern/AC radio	Republic	
United States	January 21, 2020	Contemporary hit radio	Republic	
Russia	January 24, 2020	Contemporary hit radio	Universal	
United Kingdom	January 25, 2020	Adult contemporary radio	Island	

== See also ==
- List of number-one digital songs of 2020 (U.S.)
