= Five More Minutes (Jonas Brothers song) =

2020 single by Jonas Brothers

Single by Jonas Brothers
- A-side: "X"
- Released: May 15, 2020
- Length: 2:30
- Label: Republic
- Songwriters: Nicholas Jonas; Joseph Jonas; Kevin Jonas II; James Ghaleb; Zach Skelton; Brittany Amaradio; Casey Smith
- Producer: Skelton

Jonas Brothers singles chronology
"What a Man Gotta Do" (2020)	"Five More Minutes" / "X" (2020)	"I Need You Christmas" (2020)

"Five More Minutes" is a song by American pop rock group Jonas Brothers. It was released on May 15, 2020. The song was released concurrently with "X". Both of these songs were released as part of a conjoined single titled XV.

== Background ==
During the 62nd Grammy Awards on January 26, 2020, the band opened the performance with the song. On May 12, 2020, the day after announcing the release of "X", they announced the release of the song for May 15, 2020. The singles "Five More Minutes" and "X" were both featured in their tour documentary called Happiness Continues: A Jonas Brothers Concert Film, which was released in April 2020. During an interview with Insider, Kevin Jonas said "I think 'Five More Minutes' is one of my favorite songs in this body of work that we have [..] It was written at our writing camp when we went away as a group with all of our friends and it's just fantastic. It feels good, it's an amazing song."

== Critical reception ==
Billboard's Stephen Daw said that "Five More Minutes" is a "harmonious love ballad where the trio begged their respective wives to 'give me five more minutes with you.'" Rolling Stone's Aletha legaspi said “Five More Minutes” showcases the band's softer side. The yearning ballad's chorus pleads for more time with a loved one.

== Live performances ==
They performed the single live during the 62nd Annual Grammy Awards as well as the previous-released track called, "What a Man Gotta Do".

== Charts ==
Chart (2020)	Peak position
Canadian Digital Songs (Billboard)	29
Hungary (Single Top 40)	34
New Zealand Hot Singles (RMNZ)	20
US Digital Song Sales (Billboard)	14

== Release history ==
Release dates and formats for "Five More Minutes"
Region	Date	Formats	Label	Ref.
Various	May 15, 2020	Digital download; streaming	Republic	
Russia	June 16, 2020	Contemporary hit radio	Universal	
