= Happiness Begins =

2019 studio album by Jonas Brothers

Studio album by Jonas Brothers
- Released: June 7, 2019
- Recorded: 2018–2019
- Genre: Pop
- Length: 43:44
- Label: Republic
- Producers: Louis Bell; Frank Dukes; Mike Elizondo; Jason Evigan; Gianni Giuliani; Jonas Jeberg; Greg Kurstin; Joel Little; Mike Sabath; Shellback; Zach Skelton; Sly; Ryan Tedder

Jonas Brothers chronology
Music from Chasing Happiness (2019)	Happiness Begins (2019)	The Family Business (2023)

Singles from Happiness Begins
- 1. "Sucker" Released: March 1, 2019; 2. "Cool" Released: April 5, 2019; 3. "Only Human" Released: July 2, 2019

Happiness Begins is the fifth studio album by the American pop rock band Jonas Brothers. It was released on June 7, 2019, through Republic Records. The album marks their first studio album since Lines, Vines and Trying Times (2009). For the record, the band enlisted producers Ryan Tedder, Greg Kurstin, Justin Tranter, along with Joel Little, Mike Sabath and Shellback, to help create a "new and improved sound" with "feel-good tracks" for a pop album.

The album is the first body of work of original material released by the group since their reunion on February 28, 2019, and marked a departure from the more pop rock-oriented sound from their previous albums. It was preceded by their comeback single "Sucker", and was supported by the singles "Cool" and "Only Human", all of which appeared on several charts across the world, with the former debuting atop the Billboard Hot 100.

The record received positive reviews from critics, who highlighted its production values and upbeat, pop-oriented sound. Some reviewers called it a welcomed reunion for the band, with Happiness Begins being regarded as one of the best albums from the Jonas Brothers' catalog. Critics also noted that the album captured the band's mature essence, while preserving the charm present since their early years.

The album debuted atop the US Billboard 200 and charted in multiple countries. It has sold over one million units in the United States, being certified platinum by the Recording Industry Association of America (RIAA). It has also received gold or higher certifications in Canada, Brazil, Denmark, Netherlands, Poland and Singapore. To support the album, the Jonas Brothers embarked on the Happiness Begins Tour, which took place in Europe and North America, from August 7, 2019, to February 22, 2020, having performed 92 shows.

== Background ==
On February 28, 2019, the Jonas Brothers announced their comeback via their social media accounts. On March 1, they released the lead single, "Sucker", their first under Republic Records label. The band announced the album on social media on April 22, 2019. It was set to break their decade-long album drought, after not releasing any new material since 2013's LiVe.

The album was preceded by a documentary titled Chasing Happiness, which premiered on June 4 on Amazon Prime Video. The film chronicles the band's journey since their break up in 2013, until their reunion in early 2019. It shows the process of reunion while the band talks about their journey and their careers.

== Writing and recording ==
In writing and recording for the album, the brothers said that they wanted a "new and improved sound" with "feel-good tracks", so their A&R at Republic Records, Wendy Goldstein, got in contact with Ryan Tedder, Greg Kurstin and Justin Tranter to help compose and produce songs for them. Tedder stated that they would "write a song in about 90 minutes, [... and] cut it in the second hour. It would be demo'd by dinner". This resulted in the pop-oriented, commercial sound of the album.

Billboard described the resulting sound as containing "hints of everything from '80s new wave to reggae to country", and also said that "Nick describes [album track] 'Hesitate' as Joe's love letter to Sophie, while 'I Believe' is a synth-heavy slow jam that alludes to his own whirlwind romance with Chopra".

== Release and promotion ==
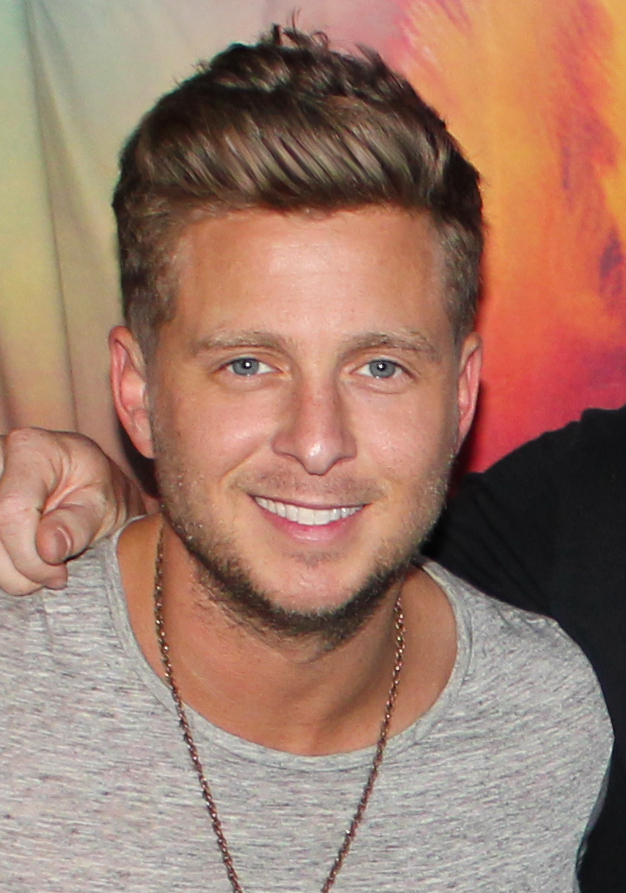
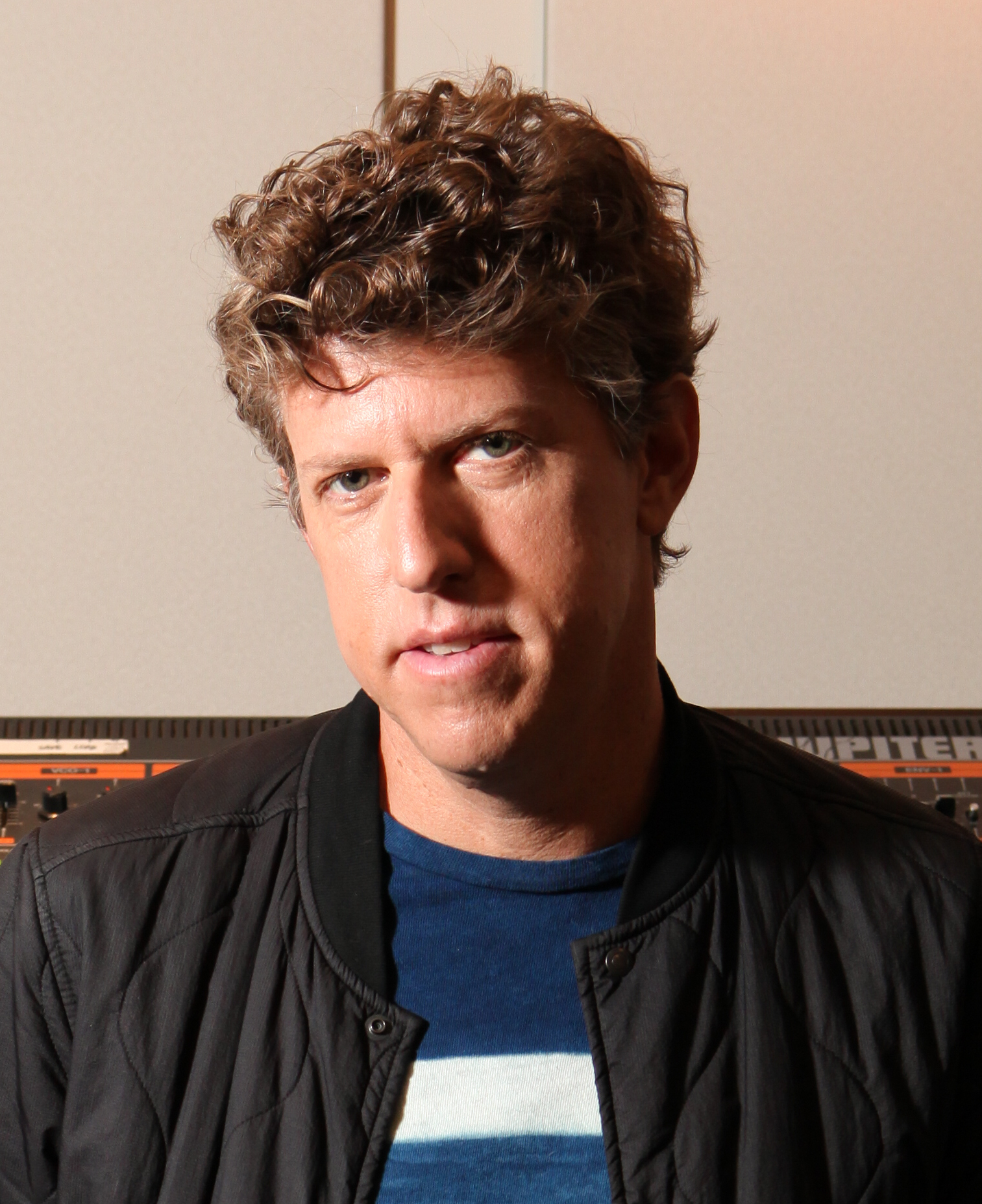
Happiness Begins features production from Ryan Tedder (pictured left) and Greg Kurstin (right); They wrote and produced the majority of tracks, along with the Jonas Brothers.

The band announced the album in a Twitter post on April 22, 2019, sharing the cover art and release date. The brothers then separately shared the news, with Kevin stating that he was "most proud" of the album.

=== World tour ===
On April 30, the band posted teasers to social media with "Happiness Begins tomorrow". The next day, the band officially announced the Happiness Begins Tour, which began on August 7, 2019. The tour played 92 shows in North America and Europe.

=== Singles ===
On March 1, 2019, "Sucker" was released as the lead single from the album. The music video was directed by Anthony Mandler and was released on the same day. The song debuted at number one on the Billboard Hot 100, becoming the Jonas Brothers' first song to do so. It was nominated for Best Pop Duo/Group Performance for the 62nd Annual Grammy Awards and in four categories at the 2019 MTV Video Music Awards, including Video of the Year, winning for Best Pop Video.

On April 5, 2019, "Cool" was released as the second single. The song debuted and peaked at number 27 on the Hot 100. The accompanying music video for "Cool" was also directed by Mandler, and premiered on the same day. "Only Human" was released as the third and final single of the album on July 2, 2019. The music video was directed by Mandler again and was released on August 13, 2019. The song peaked at number 18 on the Hot 100.

== Critical reception ==
Professional ratings
Aggregate scores
Source	Rating
Metacritic	76/100
Review scores
Source	Rating
AllMusic	4/5 stars
Consequence of Sound	B−
The Independent	4/5 stars
Pitchfork	6.2/10
Variety	3.5/5 stars

Happiness Begins received generally positive reviews from music critics, who complimented the album's production and well-crafted pop sound. The Independent's Roisin O'Connor called it "the best pop comeback – and likely one of the best pop albums – of the year", writing that "this album contains the best songs the group has produced to date". For Variety, A.D. Amorosi wrote that the record "proves Kevin, Joe and Nick never lost the familial vibe — harmonic and intuitive — that came from growing up", while complimenting the album's upbeat vibe and saying the "Jonas Brothers are back, and just in time to show the BTS(es) of the world how it’s really done".

AllMusic gave the album a four out of five stars rating, with Stephen Thomas Erlewine saying: "Happiness Begins was designed to push the Jonas Brothers back into the big time", complimenting that it "offers old-fashioned pop values in a form that feels distinctly fresh and modern". Olivia Horn of Pitchfork wrote that "it’s a respectable showing from a group that has long deserved more respect than they got", noting the sound to be "up to date with current pop trends".

Consequence's Christopher Thiessen called the album "the best effort the brothers have put forth in their career together or separately", saying it was a "welcome" reunion for the band. He also complimented the track's upbeat production that make the album a "refreshingly intimate pop record". Commenting on the album, Craig Jenkins of Vulture said "as reunions go, Happiness Begins is the best possible outcome" and that the band is "at the peak of its individual members’ powers as singers and songwriters". For Uproxx, Chloe Gilke wrote: "The Jonas Brothers’ sound as a whole has evolved to fit their songwriting sensibilities and the trends of pop in 2019" and that they "use the album as a showcase for their evolution as musicians, delivering god-tier pop that’s both perfectly ready for 2019 and reminiscent of a familiar kind of happiness. Listening to them still feels like hanging out with my best friends on a sunny summer day. They still make the kind of music I want to memorize like nothing else exists".

== Commercial performance ==
Happiness Begins debuted at number one on the US Billboard 200 with 414,000 album-equivalent units, of which 357,000 were pure sales, becoming the Jonas Brothers' fourth number-one album in the country.

In Canada, Happiness Begins, also debuted at number one with 36,000 album-equivalent units, being the group's third chart-topping album following A Little Bit Longer and Lines, Vines and Trying Times. It was the 17th best selling album of 2019 with 620,000 copies sold worldwide.

== Track listing ==
Happiness Begins track listing
No.	Title	Writer(s)	Producer(s)	Length
1.	"Sucker"	Nicholas Jonas; Joseph Jonas; Kevin Jonas II; Ryan Tedder; Adam Feeney; Louis Bell	Tedder; Frank Dukes^{[c]}	3:01
2.	"Cool"	N. Jonas; J. Jonas; K. Jonas; Tedder; Zach Skelton; Casey Smith	Tedder; Skelton	2:47
3.	"Only Human"	N. Jonas; J. Jonas; K. Jonas; Karl Schuster	Shellback; Peter Karlsson^{[v]}	3:03
4.	"I Believe"	N. Jonas; Greg Kurstin; Maureen McDonald	Kurstin	3:37
5.	"Used to Be"	N. Jonas; Tedder; Bell; Skelton	Tedder; Bell	3:04
6.	"Every Single Time"	N. Jonas; J. Jonas; Kurstin; McDonald	Kurstin	3:32
7.	"Don't Throw It Away"	N. Jonas; J. Jonas; Kurstin; McDonald	Kurstin	2:52
8.	"Love Her"	N. Jonas; J. Jonas; K. Jonas; Mike Elizondo	Elizondo	3:13
9.	"Happy When I'm Sad"	N. Jonas; Joel Little; Sarah Aarons	Little; Tedder^{[c]}; Skelton^{[c]}	2:38
10.	"Trust"	N. Jonas; J. Jonas; Tedder; Jason Evigan; Ammar Malik	Tedder; Evigan	3:00
11.	"Strangers"	N. Jonas; J. Jonas; Kurstin; McDonald	Kurstin	3:53
12.	"Hesitate"	J. Jonas; Justin Tranter; Kennedi Lykken; Mike Sabath	Sabath	3:28
13.	"Rollercoaster"	Tedder; Skelton; Jonas Jeberg; Michael Pollack; Smith	Tedder; Skelton; Jeberg^{[c]}	3:01
14.	"Comeback"	N. Jonas; J. Jonas; K. Jonas; Sylvester Sivertsen; James Ghaleb	Sly	2:35
Total length:				43:44

Target and Japanese bonus tracks
No.	Title	Writer(s)	Producer(s)	Length
15.	"First"	J. Jonas; Homer Steinweiss; Tranter; Lykken; Sabath	Sabath	2:58
16.	"Cool" (acoustic version)	N. Jonas; J. Jonas; K. Jonas; Tedder; Smith; Skelton	Skelton	2:33
Total length:				49:15

Notes

- ^{^[c]} signifies a co-producer.
- ^{^[v]} signifies a vocal producer.

== Personnel ==
Credits are adapted from the album's liner notes.

=== Jonas Brothers ===
- Joe Jonas – vocals (all tracks), background vocals (2)
- Nick Jonas – vocals (all tracks), background vocals (2), electric guitar (7), drums (11), keyboards (14)
- Kevin Jonas – background vocals (2)

=== Additional musicians ===
- Ryan Tedder – acoustic guitar (1); background vocals, bass (1, 5); drum programming (1, 5, 9), programming (1, 5, 10), electric guitar (2, 5, 9, 10), horn (10)
- Louis Bell – bass (1, 5); drum programming, programming (5)
- Homer Steinweiss – drums (1)
- Andrew DeRoberts – electric guitar (1)
- Frank Dukes – electric guitar (1)
- Casey Smith – background vocals (2, 13)
- Zach Skelton – electric guitar (2, 9, 13); bass, programming (2, 13); drums (2), drum programming (9, 13); background vocals, keyboards (13)
- Wojtek Goral – alto saxophone, flute (3)
- Shellback – background vocals, bass, keyboards, programming, tambourine (3)
- Tomas Jonsson – baritone saxophone, tenor saxophone (3)
- Mattias Bylund – bassoon, horn (3)
- Michael Engström – bass (3)
- Mia Samuelsson – flugelhorn (3)
- Nils-Petter Ankarblom – horn, horn arrangement (3)
- Jason McNab – tambourine (3)
- Jimmy Carr – tambourine (3)
- Kasper Komar – tambourine (3)
- Robert Möllard – tambourine (3)
- Peter Noos Johansson – trombone (3)
- Janne Bjerger – trombone (3)
- Magnus Johansson – trumpet (3)
- Mozella – background vocals (4)
- Greg Kurstin – bass, drums, electric guitar, synthesizer (4, 6, 7, 11); Hammond organ (6), keyboards (7, 11)
- Joel Little – bass, drums, electric guitar, programming, synthesizer (9)
- Jason Evigan – background vocals, drum programming, electric guitar (10)
- Ammar Malik – background vocals (10)
- Gian Stone – background vocals (10)
- Mike Sabath – bass, drums, electric guitar, piano, synthesizer (12)
- Brandon Collins – strings (12)
- Michael Pollack – background vocals (13)
- Ted Moock – background vocals (13)
- James Alan Ghaleb – background vocals, electric guitar (14)
- Max McElligott – bass (14)
- Simon Rossen – drums (14)
- Sylvester Sivertsen – drums, keyboards, programming (14)
- Andreas Lund – electric guitar (14)

=== Technical ===
- Randy Merrill – mastering
- Serban Ghenea – mixing
- John Hanes – mix engineering
- Rich Rich – engineering (2, 5, 9, 10, 13)
- Greg Kurstin – engineering (4, 6, 7, 11)
- Alex Pasco – engineering (4, 6, 7, 11)
- Julian Burg – engineering (4, 6, 7, 11)
- David Rodriguez – engineering (8)
- Joel Little – engineering (9)
- Gian Stone – engineering (10)
- Rafael Fadul – engineering (10)
- Jose Balaguer – engineering (12)
- Sylvester Sivertsen – engineering (14)
- Lionel Crasta – engineering assistance (10)
- Jeremy Nichols – engineering assistance (12)

=== Artwork ===
- Jacob Lerman – art direction
- Kyledidthis – art direction
- Sandy Brummels – art direction
- Jack Gorlin – photography
- Peggy Sirota – photography

== Charts ==
=== Weekly charts ===
Weekly chart performance for Happiness Begins
Chart (2019)	Peak position
Australian Albums (ARIA)	3
Austrian Albums (Ö3 Austria)	14
Belgian Albums (Ultratop Flanders)	8
Belgian Albums (Ultratop Wallonia)	18
Canadian Albums (Billboard)	1
Danish Albums (Hitlisten)	12
Dutch Albums (Album Top 100)	8
Finnish Albums (Suomen virallinen lista)	32
French Albums (SNEP)	29
German Albums (Offizielle Top 100)	17
Irish Albums (IRMA)	4
Italian Albums (FIMI)	28
Japanese Albums (Oricon)	124
Latvian Albums (LAIPA)	8
Lithuanian Albums (AGATA)	5
Mexican Albums (AMPROFON)	1
New Zealand Albums (RMNZ)	5
Norwegian Albums (VG-lista)	13
Portuguese Albums (AFP)	6
Scottish Albums (Official Charts)	3
Spanish Albums (Promusicae)	3
Swedish Albums (Sverigetopplistan)	28
Swiss Albums (Schweizer Hitparade)	16
Taiwanese Albums (G-Music)	5
UK Albums (Official Charts)	2
US Billboard 200	1

=== Year-end charts ===
2019 year-end chart performance for Happiness Begins
Chart (2019)	Position
Canadian Albums (Billboard)	25
Mexican Albums (AMPROFON)	27
US Billboard 200	26
Worldwide Albums (IFPI)	17

2020 year-end chart performance for Happiness Begins
Chart (2020)	Position
US Billboard 200	143

== Certifications ==
Certifications for Happiness Begins
Region	Certification	Certified units/sales
Brazil (Pro-Música Brasil)	Gold	20,000^{‡}
Canada (Music Canada)	2× Platinum	160,000^{‡}
Denmark (IFPI Danmark)	Platinum	20,000^{‡}
France (SNEP)	Gold	50,000^{‡}
Netherlands (NVPI)	Gold	20,000^{‡}
New Zealand (RMNZ)	Platinum	15,000^{‡}
Poland (ZPAV)	Platinum	20,000^{‡}
Singapore (RIAS)	Gold	5,000^{*}
United Kingdom (BPI)	Silver	60,000^{‡}
United States (RIAA)	Platinum	1,000,000^{‡}
^{*} Sales figures based on certification alone.^{‡} Sales+streaming figures based on certification alone.
