= Cool (Jonas Brothers song) =

2019 single by Jonas Brothers

Single by Jonas Brothers

from the album Happiness Begins
- Released: April 5, 2019
- Genre: Pop
- Length: 2:47
- Label: Republic
- Songwriters: Nicholas Jonas; Joseph Jonas; Kevin Jonas II; Ryan Tedder; Zach Skelton; Casey Smith
- Producers: Ryan Tedder; Zach Skelton

Jonas Brothers singles chronology
"Sucker" (2019)	"Cool" (2019)	"Runaway" (2019)

Music video
- "Cool" on YouTube

"Cool" is a song by American pop group the Jonas Brothers. It was released on April 5, 2019, through Republic Records as the second single off their fifth studio album, Happiness Begins (2019). The group co-wrote the song with Casey Smith and its producers Ryan Tedder and Zach Skelton. "Cool" is a midtempo summer pop song that features "strums", "vocal processors," and "stomp-clap beats" in its instrumentation. Lyrically, the song makes several pop culture references.

Upon release, "Cool" received generally favorable reviews from music critics, who praised its nostalgic "feel-good" and "summer" vibes and a "sing-along" chorus. Commercially, the song debuted at number 27 on the US Billboard Hot 100 and number 39 on the UK Singles Chart, in addition to reaching top 40 in charts of numerous territories, including Canada, Hungary, Ireland, and Scotland. It was awarded a gold certification from the Australian Recording Industry Association (ARIA) and a platinum one from Music Canada.

A colorful retro-inspired 1980s Miami Vice styled music video, directed by Anthony Mandler, was uploaded to the band's official YouTube channel on April 5, 2019, to accompany the song's release. To promote the song, Jonas Brothers performed "Cool" on Saturday Night Live and on the season finale of The Voice. It was also included in the set list of the band's Happiness Begins Tour (2019–2020).

== Background and release ==
The release of the commercially successful single "Sucker" in March 2019 marked the end of a six-year-long hiatus of American pop rock band Jonas Brothers. On April 2, 2019, the band announced the release of a second single. The artwork of the song was posted to the group's official Twitter account, featuring them in Hawaiian shirts and aviators. "Cool" was made available for streaming and digital download on April 5, 2019, by Republic Records as the second single from their fifth studio album Happiness Begins. The group co-wrote the song with Casey Smith, Ryan Tedder, and Zach Skelton, with the latter two also handling production. It was mastered by Randy Merrill and mixed by Serban Ghenea, both of whom also served as studio personnel. During an interview with Apple Music, Nick Jonas spoke about the inspiration behind writing the song:

This song came towards the end of the writing process. We were trying to write a ballad, actually, but ended up writing this instead because we all came to the studio feeling very cool that day. Feeling like a million bucks.

== Composition and lyrics ==
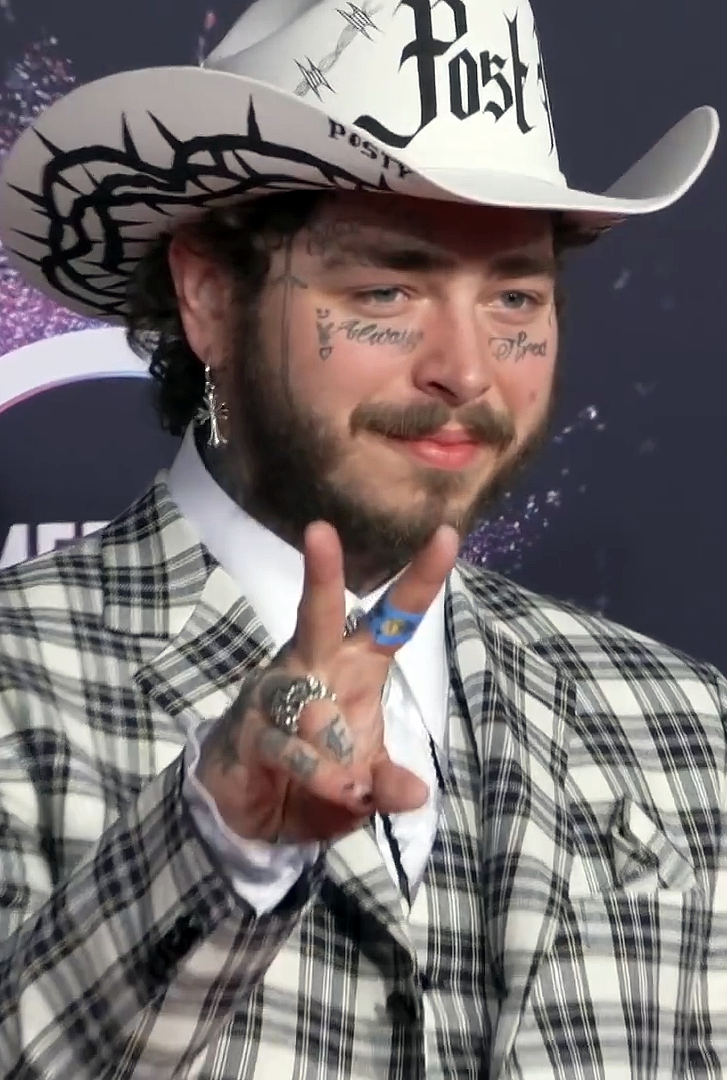
Post Malone (pictured) is referenced in the song's lyrics.

Musically, "Cool" is an upbeat summer pop song that lasts for two minutes and forty-seven seconds. In terms of musical notation, the song is composed in 4/4 time in the key of G Mixolydian – the fifth mode of the C major scale – at a moderately slow tempo of 80 beats per minute. The band's vocals span a range of D_{3} to D_{5}. The song features falsetto notes in its chorus and includes "acoustic strums", "vocal processors," and "thundering stomp-clap beat" in its production. In "Cool", the group brags about the feeling of being cool. Lyrically, the song makes several pop culture references, including Post Malone, Game of Thrones, and 1950s actor James Dean. Its lyrics include: "Oh, I feel like Post Malone when I get home / Sittin' there, winning like it's Game of Thrones / And now that we've made it, how complicated was last year?" Christopher Thiessen of Consequence of Sound described the song as an upbeat "beach-party jam."

== Critical reception ==
Upon its release, "Cool" was met with generally favourable reviews from music critics. Chris DeVille from Stereogum shared a similar view writing, "The antiseptic feel-good vibe continued on “Cool,” a comfortably swaying singalong about life getting better and better, again with a monstrous and undeniable hook." Sheldon Pearce of Pitchfork felt that the song "benefit[ed] from a hearty dose of good humor" and likened it to the group's 2006 single "Year 3000". In his review of Happiness Begins for The Independent, Roison O'Connor opined that the track "establishes the dynamic for the rest of the record." Writing for People, Jen Juneau deemed it as the "perfect summer anthem." Writing for Paper magazine, Brendan Whitmore compared "Cool" sonically to the band's 2008 singles, "Lovebug" and "Burnin' Up" but "complete with a quintessential Nick falsetto."

== Commercial performance ==
In the United States, "Cool" debuted and peaked at number 27 on the US Billboard Hot 100 and charted at number three on the Digital Song Sales chart with 29,000 downloads and 13.5 million streams. The song reached top 10 on the Billboard Pop Songs chart becoming the band's second single to do so. The song peaked at number 34 on the Canadian Hot 100, number 39 on the UK Singles Chart and number nine on the New Zealand Hot Singles chart. The song also reached the record charts in Australia, Scotland, Ireland and Hungary, among others. The song has been certified gold by the Australian Recording Industry Association (ARIA) and platinum by Music Canada.

== Promotion and music video ==
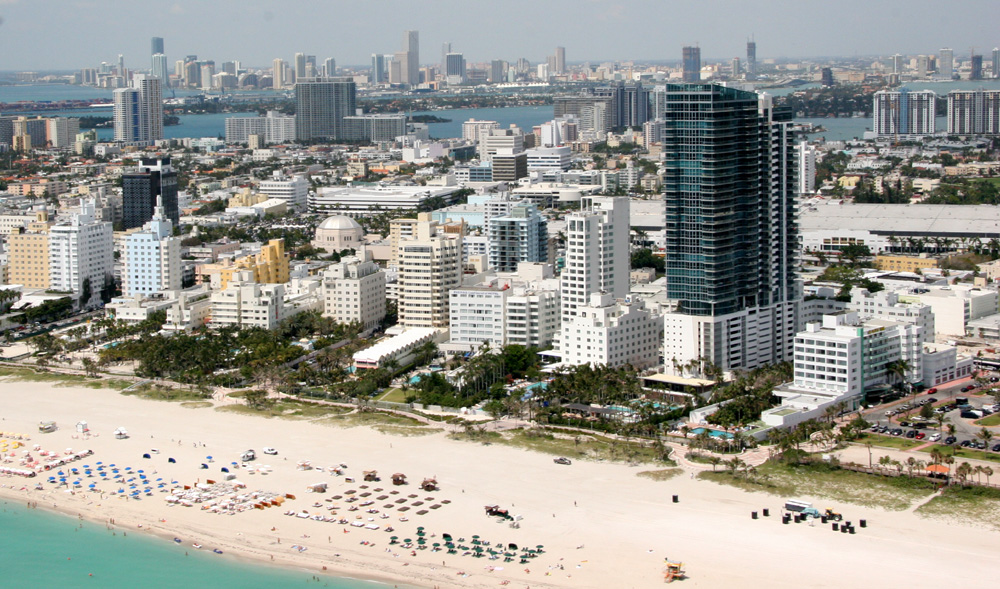
The music video for "Cool" was filmed on the Miami Beach, Florida.

An accompanying music video for "Cool" was directed by Anthony Mandler, who had previously worked with the group on the video for "Sucker", and was uploaded to the Jonas Brothers' YouTube channel on April 5, 2020. Kim Bradshaw was credited as the producer, while Taylor A. Ward served as the video editor. The video sports a colorful 1980s Miami Vice retro-inspired style, and was filmed on Miami Beach, Florida. The visual begins with the band dressed in blue suits, performing before a group of "excited" senior citizens at a colorful poolside resort. The following scene shows Nick Jonas walking down a palm-lined boulevard, supported by a dozen women, clad in pastel coloured aerobics costumes, dancing in a synchronized manner next to a yellow sports car. The next cut shows Joe Jonas dancing in suit while holding a vintage stereo on a beach where he is surrounded by several "frolic" gatherers. In one scene, Kevin Jonas plays a metal detector, like a guitar while in another, the group hangs out on a yacht at sunset. The video is interspersed with scenes featuring "overindulgent cologne spritzes and cocktails", fancy "suits and sunglasses" and parrots. It ends with the band singing the song by the ocean to spectators of all ages. Rania Aniftos of Billboard compared the visual to the music videos of Duran Duran's "Rio" (1982) and Elton John's "I'm Still Standing" (1983). Scott Baumgartner of Entertainment Tonight wrote that the video "offers a soulful, laid-back alternative to their crowd-pleaser 'Sucker'." Reviewing for Celebmix, Brittany Sims favoured the "summer" setting of the visual and compared it to the music video of the band's 2008 single, "Burnin' Up". Paper magazine's critic, Brendan Wetmore wrote that the video is "playful and catchy without trying to recreate any of their old hits."

On May 11, 2019, Jonas Brothers performed the song for the first time on television during their appearance on Saturday Night Live. On May 21, 2019, the band played the song again on the season finale of The Voice. "Cool" was also included in the set list of the band's tenth concert tour Happiness Begins Tour (2019–2020).

== Credits and personnel ==
Credits adapted from Tidal and album liner notes.

- Nick Jonas – vocals, backing vocals, guitar, songwriter
- Joe Jonas – vocals, backing vocals, songwriter
- Kevin Jonas – vocals, backing vocals, songwriter
- Casey Smith – songwriter
- Ryan Tedder – backing vocals, producer, songwriter, guitar
- Zach Skelton – backing vocals, producer, songwriter, programmer, bass guitar, drums, electric guitar, keyboards
- Rich Rich – backing vocals, engineer, studio personnel
- Randy Merrill – mastering engineer, studio personnel
- Serban Ghenea – mixer, studio personnel
- John Hanes – assistant mixer, studio personnel

== Charts ==
=== Weekly charts ===
Chart (2019)	Peak position
Australia (ARIA)	54
Canada Hot 100 (Billboard)	34
China Airplay/FL (Billboard)	30
Czech Republic Singles Digital (ČNS IFPI)	50
Greece (IFPI)	73
Hungary (Single Top 40)	10
Hungary (Stream Top 40)	33
Ireland (IRMA)	27
Lithuania (AGATA)	49
Mexico Ingles Airplay (Billboard)	12
New Zealand Hot Singles (RMNZ)	6
Scottish Singles Sales (Official Charts)	23
Slovakia Singles Digital (ČNS IFPI)	50
Sweden Heatseeker (Sverigetopplistan)	15
Switzerland (Schweizer Hitparade)	94
UK Singles (Official Charts)	39
US Billboard Hot 100	27
US Adult Pop Airplay (Billboard)	17
US Dance Airplay (Billboard)	40
US Pop Airplay (Billboard)	10
US Rolling Stone Top 100	91
Venezuela (National-Report)	2

=== Year-end charts ===
Chart (2019)	Position
US Mainstream Top 40 (Billboard)	39

== Certifications ==
Region	Certification	Certified units/sales
Australia (ARIA)	Gold	35,000^{‡}
Brazil (Pro-Música Brasil)	Gold	20,000^{‡}
Canada (Music Canada)	2× Platinum	160,000^{‡}
New Zealand (RMNZ)	Platinum	30,000^{‡}
United Kingdom (BPI)	Silver	200,000^{‡}
United States (RIAA)	Platinum	1,000,000^{‡}
^{‡} Sales+streaming figures based on certification alone.
