= Sucker (song) =

2019 single by Jonas Brothers

Single by Jonas Brothers

from the album Happiness Begins
- Released: March 1, 2019
- Recorded: January 2019
- Studio: Patriot Studios (United States); St Regis (Toronto)
- Genre: Pop rock; dance-rock
- Length: 3:01
- Label: Republic
- Songwriters: Ryan Tedder; Louis Bell; Mustafa Ahmed; Adam Feeney; Homer Steinweiss; Nicholas Jonas; Joseph Jonas; Kevin Jonas II
- Composer: Ryan Tedder
- Producer: Ryan Tedder (Note: Frank Dukes co-produced the song.)

Jonas Brothers singles chronology
"First Time" (2013)	"Sucker" (2019)	"Cool" (2019)

Music video
- "Sucker" on YouTube

"Sucker" is a song by American pop rock band Jonas Brothers. The song was released on March 1, 2019, through Republic Records. It is the group's first single released together in six years, since their reunion a day before the song was released. Ryan Tedder wrote and produced the song alongside the group co-writing with Louis Bell, Mustafa Ahmed and Homer Steinweiss. The song was also co-produced by Frank Dukes. The Jonas Brothers appeared on The Late Late Show with James Corden each night from March 4 to 7 to promote the track. It became the brothers' biggest hit single to date, reaching number one in several countries, including Australia, Canada, Latvia, Mexico, New Zealand, Singapore, Slovakia and the United States.

The official music video for "Sucker" featured their wives: Priyanka Chopra Jonas (Nick's wife), Sophie Turner (Joe's then-fiancée) and Danielle Jonas (Kevin's wife). The song was nominated for Best Pop Duo/Group Performance for the 62nd Annual Grammy Awards and in four categories at the 2019 MTV Video Music Awards, including Video of the Year, winning for Best Pop Video.

== Background and composition ==
The group had blacked out their social media prior to announcing the release on February 28. Us Weekly had also revealed the title of the song before the announcement. On The Late Late Show with James Corden, Nick Jonas stated that "We've kept this a secret now for almost seven, eight months." In terms of musical notation, the song is composed in 4/4 time and the key of C♯ minor with moderately fast tempo of 138 beats per minute. The band's vocals span a range of B_{3} to C♯_{5}.

== Commercial performance ==
In the United States, "Sucker" debuted at number one on the Billboard Hot 100 and the US Hot Digital Songs chart, with 88,000 copies sold in its first week. It was the thirty-fourth song to debut atop the Billboard Hot 100. "Sucker" became the Jonas Brothers' first number-one song and the first number one by a boy band on the chart since 2003's "Bump, Bump, Bump" by B2K featuring P. Diddy. It became the band's first entry on the chart since 2013's "Pom Poms" and their first top 10 since 2008's "Tonight". The Jonas Brothers also became the second group in a lead role in history to have a song debut at number one after Aerosmith's Armageddon theme song "I Don't Want to Miss a Thing" and the first group in this century to achieve this. It fell to number six the following week, but as airplay continued to rise the song was able to return to the top five in May and reached as high as number three on May 27, while also reaching the top of the Radio Songs chart. The song ultimately spent 22 weeks in the top ten of the chart before falling 9–12 on August 17, 2019. In the April 20, 2019 issue of Billboard's Dance/Mix Show Airplay Chart, "Sucker" became the Jonas' first number one, surging to the top spot within four weeks.

This was also their first song in the United Kingdom to chart the Top 10 and consequently, the Top 5, debuting at number 6 and later peaking at number 4 on the fourth week.

As of May 8, 2019, the song had over 630 million global streams.

== Music video ==
The music video was directed by Anthony Mandler and premiered showcasing the brothers with each of their significant others: Kevin's wife Danielle (née Deleasa), Nick's wife Priyanka Chopra Jonas, and Joe's then–fiancée Sophie Turner. It was filmed in Hertfordshire at Hatfield House, the home of the Marquess of Salisbury, where Elizabeth I grew up and featured corgis, which are the favorite breed of Queen Elizabeth II.

Their outfits were designed by Prabal Gurung, from his debut menswear line.

The video cites The Blue Angel with Sophie Turner smoking in blue négligée and top hat as Lola Lola (Marlene Dietrich) while Joe Jonas embarrasses himself in a bondage position as Professor Immanuel Rath (Emil Jannings).

== Awards and nominations ==
Year	Organization	Award	Result	Ref.
2019	Teen Choice Awards	Choice Song: Group	Nominated	
2019	Teen Choice Awards	Choice Pop Song	Nominated	
2019	MTV Video Music Awards	Video of the Year	Nominated	
2019	MTV Video Music Awards	Song of the Year	Nominated	
2019	MTV Video Music Awards	Best Pop Video	Won	
2019	MTV Video Music Awards	Song of the Summer	Nominated	
2019	LOS40 Music Awards	Best International Song	Nominated	
2019	LOS40 Music Awards	Best International Video	Nominated	
2019	MTV Millennial Awards	Global Hit	Nominated	
2019	MTV Millennial Awards Brazil	Global Hit	Nominated	
2019	Nickelodeon Mexico Kids' Choice Awards	Favorite Hit	Nominated	
2019	Nickelodeon Kids' Choice Awards	Favorite Song	Nominated	
2019	People's Choice Awards	Song of the Year	Nominated	
2019	TeleHit Awards	Best Anglo Video	Nominated	
2019	TeleHit Awards	Best Anglo Song	Nominated	
2019	TeleHit Awards	People's Best Video	Won	
2020	Grammy Awards	Best Pop Duo/Group Performance	Nominated	
2020	ASCAP Music Awards	Song of the Year	Won	
2020	Billboard Music Awards	Best Radio Song	Won	
2020	BMI Pop Awards	Most Performed Song of the Year	Won	
2020	iHeartRadio Music Awards	Song of the Year	Nominated	
2020	iHeartRadio Music Awards	Best Music Video	Nominated	
2020	iHeartRadio Music Awards	Titanium Award	Won	

== Live performances ==
On March 7, 2019, the Jonas Brothers performed the song for the first time on The Late Late Show with James Corden. On May 2, 2019, they performed the song at the Billboard Music Awards along with Nick's debut hit Jealous and Joe's hit song Cake by the Ocean with his band DNCE. On May 11, 2019, they performed the song again on Saturday Night Live as the musical guests. They also performed the song on the first episode of All That's revival on June 15, 2019 but some of the lyrics had been changed for the episode. The Jonas Brothers performed "Sucker" along "X" (without Karol G) and "What A Man Gotta Do" as Exclusive 'home' sessions recorded especially for BBC Radio 1's Big Weekend.

== Plagiarism allegations ==
American rock band, Portugal. The Man accused the Jonas Brothers' song as copying their 2017 single, "Feel It Still". Portugal. The Man tweeted: "To be fair, the chorus of Feel It Still sounds very similar to Please Mister Postman by the Marvelettes... Which we respectfully cleared and thanked them for every chance we got. As one does. @jonasbrothers" The band later clarified saying that they were "not mad at all", and that they "actually dig a lot of their music and Nick's solo records".

== Credits and personnel ==
Credits adapted from Tidal.

- Nick Jonas – vocals, songwriter
- Joe Jonas – vocals, songwriter
- Kevin Jonas – vocals, songwriter
- Louis Bell – songwriter, bass guitar
- Ryan Tedder – background vocals, producer, songwriter, programmer, acoustic guitar, bass guitar, drum programmer
- Frank Dukes – co-producer, songwriter, guitar
- Homer Steinweiss – drums, songwriter
- Mustafa Ahmed – songwriter
- Andrew DeRoberts – guitar
- Randy Merrill – mastering engineer
- Serban Ghenea – mixer
- John Hanes – assistant mixer

== Charts ==
=== Weekly charts ===
Chart (2019–2020)	Peak position
Argentina (Argentina Hot 100)	54
Australia (ARIA)	1
Austria (Ö3 Austria Top 40)	7
Belgium (Ultratop 50 Flanders)	9
Belgium (Ultratop 50 Wallonia)	7
Bolivia (Monitor Latino)	6
Canada Hot 100 (Billboard)	1
Canada AC (Billboard)	3
Canada CHR/Top 40 (Billboard)	1
Canada Hot AC (Billboard)	1
China Airplay/FL (Billboard)	3
CIS Airplay (TopHit)	8
Colombia (National-Report)	30
Costa Rica (Monitor Latino)	6
Croatia (HRT)	3
Czech Republic Airplay (ČNS IFPI)	1
Czech Republic Singles Digital (ČNS IFPI)	2
Denmark (Tracklisten)	4
Ecuador (National-Report)	22
El Salvador (Monitor Latino)	9
Euro Digital Songs (Billboard)	6
Finland (Suomen virallinen lista)	15
France (SNEP)	40
Germany (GfK)	20
Greece (IFPI)	3
Guatemala (Monitor Latino)	16
Hungary (Rádiós Top 40)	4
Hungary (Single Top 40)	2
Hungary (Stream Top 40)	2
Iceland (Tónlistinn)	34
Ireland (IRMA)	2
Israel (Media Forest)	2
Italy (FIMI)	35
Japan Hot 100 (Billboard)	69
Latvia (LAIPA)	3
Lithuania (AGATA)	2
Malaysia (RIM)	2
Mexico Airplay (Billboard)	3
Mexico Ingles Airplay (Billboard)	1
Netherlands (Dutch Top 40)	6
Netherlands (Single Top 100)	16
New Zealand (Recorded Music NZ)	1
Norway (VG-lista)	4
Panama (Monitor Latino)	10
Poland Airplay (ZPAV)	3
Portugal (AFP)	10
Puerto Rico (Monitor Latino)	10
Romania (Airplay 100)	15
Russia Airplay (TopHit)	9
Scottish Singles Sales (Official Charts)	6
Singapore (RIAS)	1
Slovakia Airplay (ČNS IFPI)	4
Slovakia Singles Digital (ČNS IFPI)	1
Slovenia (SloTop50)	6
South Korea (Gaon)	162
Spain (Promusicae)	25
Sweden (Sverigetopplistan)	24
Switzerland (Schweizer Hitparade)	12
Ukraine Airplay (TopHit)	12
UK Singles (Official Charts)	4
US Billboard Hot 100	1
US Adult Contemporary (Billboard)	1
US Adult Pop Airplay (Billboard)	1
US Dance Club Songs (Billboard)	27
US Pop Airplay (Billboard)	1
US Dance Airplay (Billboard)	1
US Rolling Stone Top 100	15
Venezuela (National-Report)	12

=== Year-end charts ===
Chart (2019)	Position
Argentina Airplay (Monitor Latino)	43
Australia (ARIA)	13
Austria (Ö3 Austria Top 40)	26
Belgium (Ultratop Flanders)	22
Belgium (Ultratop Wallonia)	24
Bolivia Airplay (Monitor Latino)	34
Canada (Canadian Hot 100)	12
CIS (Tophit)	33
Costa Rica Airplay (Monitor Latino)	20
Denmark (Tracklisten)	28
El Salvador Airplay (Monitor Latino)	39
France (SNEP)	144
Germany (Official German Charts)	51
Guatemala Airplay (Monitor Latino)	43
Honduras Airplay (Monitor Latino)	58
Hungary (Rádiós Top 40)	24
Hungary (Single Top 40)	45
Iceland (Tónlistinn)	35
Ireland (IRMA)	25
Latvia (LAIPA)	29
Mexico Airplay (Monitor Latino)	6
Netherlands (Dutch Top 40)	42
Netherlands (Single Top 100)	47
New Zealand (Recorded Music NZ)	22
Nicaragua Airplay (Monitor Latino)	94
Panama Airplay (Monitor Latino)	37
Peru Airplay (Monitor Latino)	97
Poland (ZPAV)	33
Portugal (AFP)	47
Puerto Rico Airplay (Monitor Latino)	50
Romania (Airplay 100)	63
Russia Airplay (Tophit)	33
Slovenia (SloTop50)	16
Switzerland (Schweizer Hitparade)	31
Tokyo (Tokio Hot 100)	43
Ukraine Airplay (Tophit)	156
UK Singles (Official Charts Company)	29
US Billboard Hot 100	10
US Adult Contemporary (Billboard)	9
US Adult Top 40 (Billboard)	1
US Dance/Mix Show Airplay (Billboard)	2
US Mainstream Top 40 (Billboard)	2
US Rolling Stone Top 100	14

Chart (2020)	Position
Hungary (Rádiós Top 40)	90
US Adult Contemporary (Billboard)	6

Chart (2022)	Position
Hungary (Rádiós Top 40)	52

Chart (2023)	Position
Hungary (Rádiós Top 40)	51

Chart (2024)	Position
Hungary (Rádiós Top 40)	60

Chart (2025)	Position
Hungary (Rádiós Top 40)	66

=== Decade-end charts ===
Chart (2010–2019)	Position
US Billboard Hot 100	88

== Certifications ==
Region	Certification	Certified units/sales
Australia (ARIA)	5× Platinum	350,000^{‡}
Belgium (BRMA)	Platinum	40,000^{‡}
Brazil (Pro-Música Brasil)	Diamond	160,000^{‡}
Canada (Music Canada)	8× Platinum	640,000^{‡}
Denmark (IFPI Danmark)	Platinum	90,000^{‡}
France (SNEP)	Gold	100,000^{‡}
Germany (BVMI)	Platinum	400,000^{‡}
Italy (FIMI)	Platinum	50,000^{‡}
Mexico (AMPROFON)	2× Platinum	120,000^{‡}
New Zealand (RMNZ)	4× Platinum	120,000^{‡}
Poland (ZPAV)	3× Platinum	150,000^{‡}
Portugal (AFP)	2× Platinum	20,000^{‡}
Spain (Promusicae)	2× Platinum	120,000^{‡}
United Kingdom (BPI)	2× Platinum	1,200,000^{‡}
United States (RIAA)	5× Platinum	5,000,000^{‡}
Streaming
Japan (RIAJ)	Gold	50,000,000^{†}
^{‡} Sales+streaming figures based on certification alone.^{†} Streaming-only figures based on certification alone.

== See also ==
- List of Billboard Hot 100 number-one singles of 2019
- List of Canadian Hot 100 number-one singles of 2019
- List of number-one songs of 2019 (Singapore)
- List of Billboard Adult Contemporary number ones of 2019 and 2020 (U.S.)
- List of airplay number-one hits of the 2010s (Argentina)
