= Jonas20: Greetings from Your Hometown Tour =

2025 concert tour by the Jonas Brothers

- Tour by Jonas Brothers
- Promotional poster
- Location: North America; South America
- Associated album: Greetings from Your Hometown
- Start date: August 10, 2025
- End date: August 8, 2026
- No. of shows: 90
- Supporting acts: The All-American Rejects; Arkells; Boys Like Girls; Franklin Jonas and the Byzantines; Franco Rizzaro; Marshmello; Jesse McCartney; Olivia García

Jonas Brothers concert chronology
- Five Albums. One Night. The World Tour (2023–2024); Jonas20: Greetings from Your Hometown Tour (2025–2026); The Burning Up Tour All Over Again (2026)

Jonas20: Greetings from Your Hometown Tour was the thirteenth concert tour by the American pop rock band Jonas Brothers, supporting their seventh studio album, Greetings from Your Hometown (2025), and celebrating the band's 20th anniversary. The tour commenced on August 10, 2025, at MetLife Stadium, in East Rutherford, New Jersey, and concluded on August 8, 2026, at Croix Bleue Medavie Stadium, in Moncton, New Brunswick, consisting of 90 concerts.

== Background ==
The brothers appeared on Good Morning America on March 21, 2025, in anticipation of JonasCon. During the interview, they announced a 20th anniversary-themed tour, originally called Jonas20: Living the Dream. Two days later, 43 concerts across North America were announced with the All-American Rejects, Boys Like Girls, Marshmello and Franklin Jonas and the Byzantines serving as supporting acts on select dates.

In June 2025, six of the scheduled concerts had venue changes, from stadiums to either amphitheaters or arenas. In a statement, via their social media, the band wrote: "Every decision we make is with you in mind, ensuring the best experience for our incredible fans. We're making some venue changes, but rest assured, all performances are still happening on the same dates and in the same cities." The following week, nine more shows were added to the tour, bringing it to a total of 52 concerts across North America.

The band announced they would host the Greetings From Rehearsal: Live!, a live band rehearsal where ticket holders would be able to watch as they prepare for the upcoming tour. The event took place on June 20, 2025, at the Webster Hall in New York City. That September, a second concert in Orlando, Florida, was announced, due to demand. Because of Game 4 of the 2025 WNBA semifinals match between Phoenix Mercury and Minnesota Lynx, the band had to re-schedule the Phoenix show from September 28, 2025, to the following day. On September 29, due to an increased fan demand, eighteen more North American shows were added to the tour, with Jesse McCartney being added as supporting act to most of the new tour stops. On October 22, three more date were announced. On November 24, 2025, the band added one last concert to the first leg of the tour, in Jacksonville, on December 30.

On February 26, 2026, the Jonas Brothers announced international dates for the tour. The South American dates would include: two concerts in Buenos Aires, on May 5 and 6, with Franco Rizzaro serving as a support act for the show; two in Santiago, on May 10 and 11, with Olivia García serving as a support act for both nights, along with Polimá Westcoast, who was announced as a special guest for the second show; and one in São Paulo, on May 13. On March 6, 2026, they announced a four-night Las Vegas concerts run, set to take place on May 20, 22, 23, and 24, at the Dolby Live at Park MGM. The brothers are also taking the stage on May 29, at the Thunder Valley Casino in Lincoln, California. On March 27, the band announced they would bring the tour to the Yaamava' Resort & Casino, in Highland, California, for an April 30, 2026, concert.

A concert in Thackerville, Oklahoma is set to take place on August 1, 2026, while a concert in Mount Pleasant, Michigan is set to take place on August 5. The brothers are taking the stage of the Boots and Hearts Music Festival, Oro-Medonte, Canada, for a concert on August 7. On March 16, the band announced one last show to the tour, in Moncton, on August 8, with Arkells announced as a support act for that date.

== Production ==
Upon announcement of the tour, it was revealed in addition to the band's own music, solo projects from Joe and Nick Jonas, the Administration, Deleasa, and DNCE would be performed during the concert.

== Set list ==
This set list is from the concert in East Rutherford on August 10, 2025.

1. "Lovebug"
2. "Love Me to Heaven"
3. "Only Human"
4. "S.O.S"
5. "Sucker"
6. "Meant to Live"
7. "Hold On"
8. "Little Bird"
9. "Summer Baby" / "Still in Love with You" (acoustic; fan requests)
10. "I Can't Lose"
11. "Waffle House"
12. "Beautiful Soul"
13. "Vacation Eyes"
14. "Celebrate!"
15. "No Time to Talk"
16. "Cake by the Ocean"
17. "Slow Motion"
18. "Leave Before You Love Me"
19. "Jealous"
20. "What a Man Gotta Do"
21. "Walls"
22. "Loved You Better"
23. "Chains" / "What This Could Be"
24. Versus Megamix: "Conspiracy Theory" / "Just in Love" / "Bacon" / "Toothbrush" / "Delicious" / "Unsweet" / "Levels" / "Dancing Feet"
25. "Gotta Find You"
26. "This Is Me"
27. "Wouldn't Change a Thing"
28. "Year 3000"
29. "Burnin' Up"
30. "Please Be Mine"
31. "When You Look Me in the Eyes"

=== Surprise guests and set list alterations ===
- During the August 10, 2025, concert, in East Rutherford:
  - "Meant to Live" and "Hold On" were performed with Switchfoot
  - "Beautiful Soul" was performed with Jesse McCartney
  - "Slow Motion" and "Leave Before You Love Me" were performed with Marshmello
  - "Loved You Better" was performed with Dean Lewis
  - "This Is Me" and "Wouldn't Change a Thing" were performed with Demi Lovato
- During the August 12, 2025, concert in Bristow, "Dear Maria, Count Me In" was performed with All Time Low.
- During the August 14, 2025, concert in Camden, "Just the Girl" was performed with the Click Five.
- During the August 15, 2025, concert in Virginia Beach:
  - Joe Jonas performed "Honey Blonde", "Heart by Heart", and "What This Could Be".
  - "MMMBop" and "That's Just the Way We Roll" were performed with Hanson.
- During the August 17, 2025, concert in Hershey:
  - "Say Anything (Else)" was performed with Will Pugh of Cartel
  - "The Reason" was performed with Hoobastank
- During the August 19, 2025, concert in Syracuse, Joe Jonas performed "Pay My Rent", "Truthfully", and "Body Moves".
- During the August 21, 2025, concert in Toronto:
  - "If the World Was Ending" was performed with JP Saxe
  - "Scars to Your Beautiful" was performed with Alessia Cara
- During the August 23, 2025, concert in Boston:
  - Glen Powell introduced the band
  - "Vindicated" and "Take a Breath" were performed with Chris Carrabba of Dashboard Confessional
  - "Beautiful Soul" and "Leavin'" were performed with McCartney
  - "Leave (Get Out)" and "Vacation Eyes" were performed with JoJo
  - Kevin Jonas performed his then-unreleased solo single, "Changing".
- During the August 24, 2025, concert in Saratoga:
  - Nick Jonas performed "This Is Heaven", "Close" , and "Chains".
  - Joe Jonas performed "Toothbrush".
  - The Jonas Brothers performed "Play My Music".
- During the August 28, 2025, concert in Detroit, "Happen to Me" was performed with Russell Dickerson.
- During the August 31, 2025, concert in Dallas:
  - "On the Way Down" was performed with Ryan Cabrera
  - "Peter Pan" and "Fly with Me" were performed with Kelsea Ballerini
  - "Hey There Delilah" was performed with the Plain White T's
  - "Backwards" was performed for the first time and added to the set list from that date.
  - Kevin Jonas performed "Changing".
  - "Worth It" and "Work from Home" were performed by Fifth Harmony
- During the September 4, 2025, concert in Chula Vista:
  - "Greetings From Your Hometown" and "Dare You to Move" were performed with Switchfoot
  - Joe Jonas performed "Honey Blonde", "Heart by Heart", and "What This Could Be".
  - "I'm Yours" was performed with Jason Mraz
- During the September 6, 2025, concert in Inglewood:
  - "Inseparable" and "Bully" were performed acoustically as fan requests.
  - "All of Me" and "I Believe" were performed with John Legend
  - "She Looks So Perfect" was performed with 5 Seconds of Summer
- During the September 13, 2025, concert in West Valley City:
  - "Mirror to the Sky" was performed.
  - "I'm Just a Kid" was performed with Pierre Bouvier.
  - "Everybody Talks" was performed with Tyler Glenn.
  - Kevin Jonas performed "Changing".
- During the September 18, 2025, concert in Vancouver, "Cliché" and "Sucker" were performed with Machine Gun Kelly
- During the September 22, 2025, concert in Seattle:
  - "4ever" was performed with the Veronicas
  - "In Too Deep" was performed with Deryck Whibley and Frank Zummo from Sum 41
- During the September 25, 2025, concert in San Francisco:
  - "Lil Boo Thang" was performed with Paul Russell
  - "Dark Blue" and "Fly with Me" were performed with Andrew McMahon
- During the September 26, 2025, concert in Sacramento, "Hold On" was performed with Chord Overstreet.
- During the September 27, 2025, concert in Anaheim:
  - "A Thousand Years" was performed with Christina Perri
  - "California" was performed with Phantom Planet
- During the September 29, 2025, concert in Phoenix:
  - "Black Butterflies and Deja Vu" was performed with the Maine.
  - "No Air" was performed with Jordin Sparks.
- During the September 30, 2025, concert in Albuquerque, "In Case You Didn't Know” was performed with Brett Young.
- During the October 2, 2025, concert in Denver:
  - "Embers and Envelopes" was performed with Dave Elkins.
  - Nick Jonas performed "Close" and Joe Jonas performed "Heart by Heart".
- During the October 8, 2025, concert in St. Louis:
  - "Unwritten" was performed with Natasha Bedingfield.
  - Nick Jonas performed "Chains" and Joe Jonas performed "Toothbrush".
- During the October 12, 2025, concert in Milwaukee:
  - "Tantrum" was performed after a fan requested the song.
  - Joe Jonas and Nick Jonas each performed an unreleased song, titled "Olivia" and "911", respectively.
  - "Ocean Avenue" was performed with Ryan Key and Sean Mackin of Yellowcard
- During the October 14, 2025, concert in Nashville:
  - "American Dreaming" and "Sip Your Wine" were performed with Sierra Ferrell.
  - "The Middle" was performed with Maren Morris.
  - Nick Jonas performed "Close" and Joe Jonas performed "Toothbrush".
- During the October 16, 2025, concert in Tulsa, "Brand New" was performed with Ben Rector.
- During the October 17, 2025, concert in Austin:
  - "I Don't Want to Be" was performed with Gavin DeGraw.
  - Nick Jonas performed "Levels" and Joe Jonas performed "Body Moves".
- During the October 18, 2025, concert in San Antonio:
  - Joe Jonas performed "Pay My Rent".
  - "Issues" and "Close" were performed with Julia Michaels.
- During the October 19, 2025, concert in Houston, "¿Cómo Pasó?" and "Slow Motion" were performed with Ela Taubert
- During the October 26, 2025, concert in Orlando:
  - "How Far I'll Go" was performed with Auli'i Cravalho
  - "Dos Oruguitas" and "Runaway" were performed with Sebastián Yatra
  - "Young Dumb & Broke" was performed with Khalid
- During the October 28, 2025, concert in Atlanta:
  - "Tongue Tied" was performed with Grouplove
  - "Bubbly" was performed with Colbie Caillat
- During the November 4, 2025, concert in Knoxville:
  - "Ordinary" and "Burning Down" were performed with Alex Warren.
  - "Coming Home This Christmas" was performed live for the first time and added to the set list from that date.
- During the November 9, 2025, concert in Buffalo, "I Just Don't Know You Yet" and "Walls" were performed with Absolutely.
- During the November 12, 2025, concert in Pittsburgh:
  - "You Just Don't Know It" and "Tables" were performed as fan requests
  - Joe Jonas performed "Velvet Sunshine" with Franklin Jonas and Nick Jonas performed "Santa Barbara".
- During the November 16 and 17, 2025, concerts in Newark:
  - "Let Me Love You" was performed with Mario
  - "Face Down" was performed with the Red Jumpsuit Apparatus
- During the November 20, 2025, concert in Providence, Jvke performed his songs, "Golden Hour", "Her", and "This Is What Forever Feels Like".
- During the November 22, 2025, concert in Cincinnati, "Shut Up and Dance" was performed with Walk the Moon.
- During the November 29, 2025, concert in Las Vegas:
  - Nick Jonas performed his then-unreleased solo single, "Gut Punch", before performing "If the World Was Ending" and "I Need You", with Saxe.
  - "Coming Home This Christmas" was performed with Kenny G, who also performed an instrumental version of "My Heart Will Go On" by Celine Dion on the saxophone
- During the December 4, 2025, concert in Fort Worth:
  - "Best Night" was performed.
  - "Pieces of Me" was performed with Ashlee Simpson.
- During the December 6, 2025, concert in New Orleans, "How to Save a Life" was performed with Isaac Slade.
- During the December 12, 2025, concert in Grand Rapids, "Last Christmas" was performed with McCartney.
- During the December 14, 2025, concert in Hamilton:
  - "A Little Bit Yours" was performed with Saxe.
  - "Leather Jacket" was performed by Arkells.
- During the December 18, 2025, concert in Manchester, "A Thousand Miles" was performed with Vanessa Carlton.
- During the December 20, 2025, concert in Baltimore, "How to Live" was performed with Del Water Gap.
- During the December 21, 2025, concert in Elmont, "Home Alone" was performed with Andrew Barth Feldman.
- During the December 22, 2025, concert in Brooklyn:
  - "Too Little Too Late" and "Vacation Eyes" were performed with JoJo
  - "Fly with Me" was performed with Yoshiki
  - "Don't Know Why" was performed with Norah Jones
  - "Back to Friends" was performed with Sombr
- During the December 30, 2025, concert in Jacksonville, "Scared to Start" was performed with Michael Marcagi.
- During the May 5, 2026, concert in Buenos Aires, "This Is Me" and "Cupido" were performed with Tini.
- During the May 10 and 11, 2026, concerts in Santiago:
  - "Ponte Ponte" and "Alo" were performed by Katteyes.
  - "Me Rehúso" was performed with Danny Ocean.
  - "Lacone," "Ultra Solo" and "Bajenpaka!" were performed by Polimá Westcoast.
- During the May 13, 2026, concert in São Paulo:
  - "Boa Sorte / Good Luck" was performed with Vanessa da Mata
  - "What We Are" was performed with Luísa Sonza.

== Tour dates ==
List of 2025 concerts
Date (2025)	City	Country	Venue	Supporting acts	Attendance	Revenue
August 10	East Rutherford	United States	MetLife Stadium	The All-American Rejects; Marshmello; Franklin Jonas	55,179 / 55,179	$6,813,616
August 12 (Note: The August 12, 2025, concert was originally scheduled to take place at Nationals Park in Washington, D.C.)	Bristow (Note: Promoted as Washington, D.C. in press material.)	United States	Jiffy Lube Live	The All-American Rejects; Marshmello; Franklin Jonas	17,712 / 17,712	$1,258,216
August 14 (Note: The August 14, 2025, concert was originally scheduled to take place at Citizens Bank Park in Philadelphia.)	Camden (Note: Promoted as Philadelphia in press material.)	United States	Freedom Mortgage Pavilion	The All-American Rejects; Marshmello; Franklin Jonas	20,519 / 20,519	$1,504,750
August 15	Virginia Beach	United States	Veterans United Home Loans Amphitheater	The All American Rejects; Franklin Jonas	13,169 / 13,169	$767,497
August 17	Hershey	United States	Hersheypark Stadium	The All-American Rejects; Marshmello; Franklin Jonas	22,635 / 22,635	$2,419,711
August 18	Bethel	United States	Bethel Woods Center for the Arts	Boys Like Girls; Franklin Jonas	12,329 / 12,329	$509,068
August 19	Syracuse	United States	Empower Federal Credit Union Amphitheater	Boys Like Girls; Franklin Jonas	9,490 / 9,490	$536,789
August 21	Toronto	Canada	Rogers Centre	Boys Like Girls; Marshmello; Franklin Jonas	44,322 / 44,322	$2,639,502
August 23	Boston	United States	Fenway Park	Boys Like Girls; Marshmello; Franklin Jonas	35,597 / 35,597	$3,454,411
August 24	Saratoga Springs	United States	Saratoga Springs Performing Arts Center	Boys Like Girls; Franklin Jonas	10,861 / 10,861	$727,376
August 26 (Note: The August 26, 2025, concert was originally scheduled to take place at Wrigley Field in Chicago.)	Tinley Park (Note: Promoted as Chicago in press material.)	United States	Credit Union 1 Amphitheatre	Boys Like Girls; Marshmello; Franklin Jonas	18,246 / 18,246	$1,470,404
August 28 (Note: The August 28, 2025, concert was originally scheduled to take place at Comerica Park.)	Detroit	United States	Little Caesars Arena	Boys Like Girls; Marshmello; Franklin Jonas	13,648 / 13,648	$1,817,016
August 30	Rogers	United States	Walmart AMP	Boys Like Girls; Franklin Jonas	8,788 / 8,788	$723,855
August 31 (Note: The August 31, 2025, concert was originally scheduled to take place at Globe Life Field in Arlington.)	Dallas	United States	Dos Equis Pavilion	Boys Like Girls; Marshmello; Franklin Jonas	20,490 / 20,490	$1,609,090
September 4	Chula Vista (Note: Promoted as San Diego in press material.)	United States	North Island Credit Union Amphitheatre	Boys Like Girls; Franklin Jonas	15,954 / 15,954	$921,500
September 6 (Note: The September 6, 2025, concert was originally scheduled to take place at Dodger Stadium in Los Angeles.)	Inglewood (Note: Promoted as Los Angeles in press material.)	United States	Intuit Dome	Boys Like Girls; Franklin Jonas	12,834 / 12,834	$1,972,014
September 13	West Valley City (Note: Promoted as Salt Lake City in press material.)	United States	Utah First Credit Union Amphitheatre	Boys Like Girls; Franklin Jonas	18,719 / 18,719	$1,261,491
September 18	Vancouver	Canada	Rogers Arena	Boys Like Girls; Franklin Jonas	13,584 / 13,584	$1,089,100
September 20	Portland	United States	Moda Center	Boys Like Girls; Franklin Jonas	12,311 / 12,311	$1,314,963
September 22	Seattle	United States	Climate Pledge Arena	Boys Like Girls; Franklin Jonas	14,013 / 14,013	$1,838,307
September 25	San Francisco	United States	Chase Center	Boys Like Girls; Franklin Jonas	12,456 / 12,456	$1,672,046
September 26	Sacramento	United States	Golden 1 Center	Boys Like Girls; Franklin Jonas	13,424 / 13,424	$1,567,334
September 27	Anaheim	United States	Honda Center	Boys Like Girls; Franklin Jonas	13,021 / 13,021	$1,780,889
September 29	Phoenix	United States	PHX Arena	Boys Like Girls; Franklin Jonas	11,526 / 11,526	$1,761,120
September 30	Albuquerque	United States	Isleta Amphitheater	Boys Like Girls; Franklin Jonas	13,522 / 13,522	$665,534
October 2	Denver	United States	Ball Arena	Boys Like Girls; Franklin Jonas	13,735 / 13,735	$1,717,821
October 5	Des Moines	United States	Casey's Center	Boys Like Girls; Franklin Jonas	9,598 / 9,598	$1,119,375
October 6 (Note: This concert was originally scheduled for October 4, 2025, but was rescheduled to October 6, without reason.)	Omaha	United States	CHI Health Center	Boys Like Girls; Franklin Jonas	12,729 / 12,729	$1,481,565
October 7	Kansas City	United States	T-Mobile Center	The All-American Rejects; Franklin Jonas	13,260 / 13,260	$1,104,344
October 8	St. Louis	United States	Enterprise Center	The All-American Rejects; Franklin Jonas	12,155 / 12,155	$1,698,805
October 10	Saint Paul	United States	Grand Casino Arena	The All-American Rejects; Franklin Jonas	13,953 / 13,953	$1,874,845
October 12	Milwaukee	United States	Fiserv Forum	The All-American Rejects; Franklin Jonas	10,540 / 10,540	$1,437,263
October 14	Nashville	United States	Bridgestone Arena	The All-American Rejects; Franklin Jonas	13,324 / 13,324	$1,776,719
October 16	Tulsa	United States	BOK Center	The All-American Rejects; Franklin Jonas	10,137 / 11,031	$1,118,571
October 17	Austin	United States	Moody Center	The All-American Rejects; Franklin Jonas	10,914 / 10,914	$1,245,511
October 18	San Antonio	United States	Frost Bank Center	The All-American Rejects; Franklin Jonas	13,428 / 13,428	$1,670,879
October 19	Houston	United States	Toyota Center	The All-American Rejects; Franklin Jonas	12,109 / 12,109	$1,652,026
October 22	Tampa	United States	Benchmark International Arena	The All-American Rejects; Franklin Jonas	12,303 / 12,303	$1,380,943
October 24	Sunrise	United States	Amerant Bank Arena	The All-American Rejects; Franklin Jonas	12,749 / 12,749	$1,722,199
October 26	Orlando	United States	Kia Center	The All-American Rejects; Franklin Jonas	23,566 / 23,566	$3,027,281
October 27	Orlando	United States	Kia Center	The All-American Rejects; Franklin Jonas	23,566 / 23,566	$3,027,281
October 28	Atlanta	United States	State Farm Arena	The All-American Rejects; Franklin Jonas	12,604 / 12,604	$1,365,086
October 29	Raleigh	United States	Lenovo Center	The All-American Rejects; Franklin Jonas	12,521 / 12,521	$1,543,124
November 1	Lexington	United States	Rupp Arena	The All-American Rejects; Franklin Jonas	12,850 / 12,850	$1,487,486
November 2	Indianapolis	United States	Gainbridge Fieldhouse	The All-American Rejects; Franklin Jonas	11,069 / 11,069	$1,499,776
November 4	Knoxville	United States	Food City Center	The All-American Rejects; Franklin Jonas	12,833 / 12,833	$1,495,735
November 5	Charlotte	United States	Spectrum Center	The All-American Rejects; Franklin Jonas	13,225 / 13,225	$1,689,247
November 6	Columbia	United States	Colonial Life Arena	The All-American Rejects; Franklin Jonas	13,351 / 13,351	$1,455,838
November 8	Columbus	United States	Schottenstein Center	The All-American Rejects; Franklin Jonas	13,124 / 13,124	$1,491,478
November 9	Buffalo	United States	KeyBank Center	The All-American Rejects; Franklin Jonas	12,322 / 12,322	$1,342,409
November 11	Cleveland	United States	Rocket Arena	The All-American Rejects; Franklin Jonas	13,612 / 13,612	$1,524,823
November 12	Pittsburgh	United States	PPG Paints Arena	The All-American Rejects; Franklin Jonas	12,839 / 12,839	$1,324,752
November 14	Uncasville	United States	Mohegan Sun Arena	The All-American Rejects; Franklin Jonas	6,668 / 6,668	$1,369,927
November 16	Newark	United States	Prudential Center	The All-American Rejects; Franklin Jonas	22,588 / 22,588	$2,515,461
November 17	Newark	United States	Prudential Center	Franklin Jonas; Jesse McCartney	22,588 / 22,588	$2,515,461
November 19	Elmont	United States	UBS Arena	Franklin Jonas; Jesse McCartney	10,444 / 14,125	$735,559
November 20	Providence	United States	Amica Mutual Pavilion	Franklin Jonas; Jesse McCartney	12,436 / 12,436	$1,239,194
November 22	Cincinnati	United States	Heritage Bank Center	Franklin Jonas; Jesse McCartney	12,746 / 12,746	$1,247,829
November 23	Detroit	United States	Little Caesars Arena	Franklin Jonas; Jesse McCartney	13,221 / 13,221	$1,858,294
November 29	Paradise (Note: Promoted as Las Vegas in press material.)	United States	MGM Grand Garden Arena	Franklin Jonas	11,137 / 11,137	$1,231,100
November 30	West Valley City	United States	Maverik Center	Franklin Jonas	9,322 / 9,322	$1,014,853
December 3	Wichita	United States	Intrust Bank Arena	Franklin Jonas; Jesse McCartney	7,041 / 8,309	$709,608
December 4	Fort Worth	United States	Dickies Arena	Franklin Jonas; Jesse McCartney	11,998 / 12,216	$1,441,077
December 6	New Orleans	United States	Smoothie King Center	Franklin Jonas; Jesse McCartney	13,330 / 13,330	$1,571,593
December 9	North Little Rock	United States	Simmons Bank Arena	Franklin Jonas; Jesse McCartney	14,890 / 14,890	$1,629,477
December 11	Rosemont	United States	Allstate Arena	Franklin Jonas; Jesse McCartney	13,034 / 13,034	$1,329,922
December 12	Grand Rapids	United States	Van Andel Arena	Franklin Jonas; Jesse McCartney	12,092 / 12,092	$1,385,283
December 14	Hamilton	Canada	TD Coliseum	Franklin Jonas; Jesse McCartney	15,407 / 16,520	$990,814
December 15	Ottawa	Canada	Canadian Tire Centre	Franklin Jonas; Jesse McCartney	11,139 / 11,427	$858,428
December 17	Montreal	Canada	Bell Centre	Franklin Jonas; Jesse McCartney	13,591 / 14,756	$1,023,228
December 18	Manchester	United States	SNHU Arena	Franklin Jonas; Jesse McCartney	6,658 / 6,658	$908,425
December 20	Baltimore	United States	CFG Bank Arena	Franklin Jonas; Jesse McCartney	12,077 / 12,077	$1,289,157
December 21	Elmont	United States	UBS Arena	Franklin Jonas; Jesse McCartney	14,125 / 14,125	$1,766,640
December 22	Brooklyn	United States	Barclays Center	Franklin Jonas; Jesse McCartney	14,304 / 14,304	$1,912,566
December 30	Jacksonville	United States	Daily's Place	Franklin Jonas; Deleasa	4,309 / 4,309	$842,954
Total					1,058,294 / 1,066,921 (99%)	$112,116,951

List of 2026 concerts
Date (2026)	City	Country	Venue	Supporting acts	Attendance	Revenue
April 30	Highland	United States	Yaamava' Resort & Casino	—	—	—
May 5	Buenos Aires	Argentina	Movistar Arena	—	—	—
May 6	Buenos Aires	Argentina	Movistar Arena	—	—	—
May 10	Santiago	Chile	Movistar Arena	—	—	—
May 11	Santiago	Chile	Movistar Arena	—	—	—
May 13	São Paulo	Brazil	Allianz Parque	—	—	—
May 20	Paradise (Note: Promoted as Las Vegas in press material.)	United States	Dolby Live	—	—	—
May 22	Paradise	United States	Dolby Live	—	—	—
May 23	Paradise	United States	Dolby Live	—	—	—
May 24	Paradise	United States	Dolby Live	—	—	—
May 29	Lincoln	United States	Thunder Valley Casino Resort	—	—	—
August 1	Thackerville	United States	Lucas Oil Live	—	—	—
August 5	Mount Pleasant	United States	Soaring Eagle Casino	—	—	—
August 7	Oro-Medonte	Canada	Burl's Creek Event Grounds	—	—	—
August 8	Moncton	Canada	Croix-Bleue Medavie Stadium	—	—	—
