= Friends from Your Hometown =

2026 live album by Jonas Brothers

Live album by Jonas Brothers
- Released: March 13, 2026
- Length: 77:12
- Label: Republic
- Producer: Joe Jonas; Kevin Jonas; Nick Jonas

Jonas Brothers chronology
A Very Jonas Christmas Movie (Original Soundtrack) (2025)	Friends from Your Hometown (2026)

Friends from Your Hometown is the fourth live album by the American pop rock band Jonas Brothers, released on March 13, 2026, through Republic Records. The album was recorded during the Jonas20: Greetings from Your Hometown Tour (2025) and contains guest performances from MGK, Demi Lovato, John Legend, JoJo, 5 Seconds of Summer, Dashboard Confessional, Absolutely, Plain White T's, Khalid, Jordin Sparks, Simple Plan, Alessia Cara, Hoobastank, Jason Mraz, Maren Morris, Sierra Ferrell, Colbie Caillat, Yellowcard, and JP Saxe, as well as a live rendition of "Backwards", a song from their seventh studio album, Greetings from Your Hometown (2025).

== Background ==
On August 8, 2025, the Jonas Brothers released their seventh studio album, Greetings from Your Hometown. Soon after, the group embarked on a concert tour to promote the album, as well as celebrate their 20th anniversary as a band. The tour, titled Jonas20: Greetings from Your Hometown Tour, started its North American leg on August 10, 2025, at MetLife Stadium, in East Rutherford, New Jersey, and concluded on December 30, 2025, at Daily's Place, in Jacksonville, Florida. During most concerts of the tour, the band invited a special guest star to perform on stage.

== Release ==
Friends from Your Hometown was released on March 13, 2026, through Republic Records. The album consists of live versions of songs the Jonas Brothers performed with some special guests they invited to perform on tour, along with a live rendition of "Backwards", from their seventh studio album, Greetings from Your Hometown (2025).

== Track listing ==
Friends from Your Hometown track listing
No.	Title	Writer(s)	Length
1.	"Sucker" (featuring MGK)	Nicholas Jonas; Joseph Jonas; Ryan Tedder; Adam Feeney; Louis Bell	3:13
2.	"Wouldn't Change a Thing" (featuring Demi Lovato)	Adam Anders; Peer Åström; Nikki Hassman	3:27
3.	"I Believe" (featuring John Legend)	N. Jonas; Greg Kurstin; Maureen McDonald	4:19
4.	"Vacation Eyes" (featuring JoJo)	N. Jonas; J. Jonas; K. Jonas; Jonathan Bellion; Peter Nappi; Jason Cornet	4:47
5.	"She Looks So Perfect" (featuring 5 Seconds of Summer)	Ashton Irwin; Michael Clifford; Jake Sinclair	4:11
6.	"Take a Breath" (featuring Dashboard Confessional)	N. Jonas; J. Jonas; K. Jonas; Jess Cates	2:35
7.	"Walls" (featuring Absolutely)	N. Jonas; J. Jonas; K. Jonas; Bellion; Nappi; Cornet; Johnny Simpson; Clyde Lawrence; Jordan Cohen; Felicia Ferraro; Andrea Rosario; Douglas Davis	4:24
8.	"Hey There Delilah" (featuring Plain White T's)	Tom Higgenson	4:16
9.	"Young Dumb & Broke" (featuring Khalid)	Khalid Robinson; Joel Little; Talay Riley	3:12
10.	"No Air" (featuring Jordin Sparks)	Harvey Mason Jr.; Damon Thomas; Steve Russell; James Fauntleroy II; Erik Griggs	4:40
11.	"I'm Just a Kid" (featuring Simple Plan)	Pierre Bouvier; Chuck Comeau; Arnold Lanni; Sébastien Lefebvre; Jeff Stinco	3:10
12.	"Scars to Your Beautiful" (featuring Alessia Cara)	Alessia Caracciolo; Warren Felder; Coleridge Tillman; Andrew Wansel; Justin Franks	3:49
13.	"The Reason" (featuring Hoobastank)	Daniel Estrin	4:05
14.	"I'm Yours" (featuring Jason Mraz)	Mraz	4:49
15.	"The Middle" (featuring Maren Morris)	Anton Zaslavski; Kyle Trewartha; Michael Trewartha; Jordan K. Johnson; Stefan Johnson; Marcus Lomax; Sarah Aarons	3:22
16.	"American Dreaming" (featuring Sierra Ferrell)	Ferrell; Melody Walker	4:47
17.	"Bubbly" (featuring Colbie Caillat)	Caillat; Jason Reeves	3:10
18.	"Ocean Avenue" (featuring Yellowcard)	Ryan Key; Ben Harper; Sean Mackin; Peter Mosely; Longineu W. Parsons III	3:26
19.	"If the World Was Ending" (featuring JP Saxe)	Jonathan Percy Starker Saxe; Julia Michaels	4:26
20.	"Backwards"	Grace Barker; Benjamin Ingrosso; Lionel Crasta; Mark Schick	3:04
Total length:			77:12

Notes

- All tracks are subtitled "Live".
- All tracks are produced by Joe, Kevin and Nick Jonas.

== Release history ==
Friends from Your Hometown release history
Region	Date	Format(s)	Label	Ref.
Various	March 13, 2026	Digital download; streaming	Republic	
