= Music for People Who Believe in Love =

2025 studio album by Joe Jonas

- Standard cover

Studio album by Joe Jonas
- Released: May 23, 2025
- Studio: Deerfield (Los Angeles); House of Blues (Los Angeles); Hyde Street (San Francisco); Chumba Meadows (Los Angeles); PWZ Custom Recordings (La Crescenta-Montrose); Laurel House (West Hollywood); Largaland; Q Division (Cambridge); Amusement (Los Angeles); Strongroom (London)
- Length: 44:18
- Label: Republic
- Producer: Alexander 23; Domi and JD Beck; Michael Coleman; Tommy English; Jason Evigan; Fat Max Gsus; Hazey Eyes; Oscar Holter; Savan Kotecha; Dan Nigro; Kane Ritchotte; Mark Schick; Valley Boy

Joe Jonas chronology
Fastlife (2011)	Music for People Who Believe in Love (2025)

Singles from Music for People Who Believe in Love
- 1. "Work It Out" Released: July 19, 2024; 2. "What This Could Be" Released: October 4, 2024; 3. "Heart by Heart" Released: April 25, 2025

Music for People Who Believe in Love is the second studio album by the American singer-songwriter Joe Jonas, released on May 23, 2025, through Republic Records. The record serves as the follow-up to Jonas' previous solo album, Fastlife (2011), and features guest appearances from Domi and JD Beck, Jonas' younger brother Frankie Jonas, Sierra Ferrell, Louane, Tiny Habits, and Luísa Sonza. Production was handled by Domi and JD Beck themselves, Alexander 23, Jason Evigan, Kane Ritchotte, Oscar Holter, Savan Kotecha, Fat Max Gsus, Tommy English, Mark Schick, Michael Coleman, Valley Boy, Dan Nigro, and Hazey Eyes.

Music for People Who Believe in Love was preceded by the release of three singles, "Work It Out", released on July 19, 2024, "What This Could Be", released on October 4, 2024, and "Heart by Heart", released on April 25, 2025. On May 27, 2025, Jonas released a digital deluxe version of the album, featuring a new song and three tracks recorded from his Vevo live sessions. To promote the album, Jonas performed a series of live solo concerts and performances across the world.

== Background and conception ==
On May 29, 2024, Jonas began teasing new solo material through TikTok, releasing the snippet of a new song. The singer revealed he was both "excited and emotional" to be sharing this new material, stating he got to work with some of his favorite artists and producers. In an interview with Rolling Stone, Jonas expressed his excitement to be able to share new music, and how he felt the music he was writing wasn't a good fit for either of his bands—the Jonas Brothers and DNCE. He stated that the personal nature of his songwriting was the reason why he decided to release this solo project.

On July 17, 2024, the singer announced the release of his second album, which would be titled Music for People Who Believe in Love, and was set to be released on October 18, 2024. The project is a follow-up to his debut solo album Fastlife, released on October 11, 2011. In an interview for Jake Shane's podcast, Therapuss, Jonas stated that he asked for "blessings" from his brothers Kevin and Nick Jonas, the remaining Jonas Brothers members, to release the solo material. Once he got the support from them, it took about two to three weeks for the album to come together.

In an interview for Billboard, the singer explained how his new music differs greatly from the ones on his previous solo album, Fastlife, stating that, although he is proud of those songs, "it feels like a different person". He expressed that creating this new music is both scary and freeing, and that his life experiences, being a father, and going through a divorce helped him shape the album. He further explained that, even though the music feels very personal to his life experiences, he isn't "trying to come for anyone" in the new album.

Prior to the album release, Jonas partnered with Dutch fashion brand Scotch & Soda to create a personalized clothing collection. He stated that the company allowed him to have full creative control to come up with the 1970s-inspired looks. During the process of creating the designs, Jonas included lyrics from his songs to the clothes in order to make them feel personal to him.

== Writing and recording ==
This album speaks to the experiences of being a father, being a friend to oneself and others, and the happiness I've found in doing what I love for a living. I feel incredibly fortunate to travel the world and connect with people through my music, as well as having had the opportunity to work with some of the most talented musicians, songwriters, and producers on this project.

— Joe Jonas on developing Music for People Who Believe in Love, via interview with Billboard

Following the release of the teases, the lyrics "even baddies get saddies", taken from the song "Work It Out", sparkled discussion amongst the media on the possible references to Jonas and Sophie Turner's divorce. While writing the song, which initially was meant for Jonas' band—the Jonas Brothers, Joe Jonas felt a personal connection to it, expressing his desire to release it outside of his group projects. "Work It Out" was described as a "celebration of gratitude, hope, and love" since it touches on Jonas' experience as a father and finding happiness. He further explained that this single helped him find a "sense of belonging and security", which made the production time a lot quicker, with the song coming together in approximately one hour.

Even though Music for People Who Believe in Love is a solo project for Jonas, he chose to collaborate with multiple artists whom he admired. He stated that he wanted to bring other narratives and distinct voices to the record. Among those collaborators are Alexander 23, Muna's Josette Maskin, Jason Evigan, Tommy English and Paris Carney. Brazilian singer Luísa Sonza, who previously collaborated with Demi Lovato, was announced as a feature artist on the song "What We Are". During an interview with Entertainment Weekly, Jonas explained that much of the album is "speaking in third person" or talking with a "fictional version" of himself or someone in his life, and that being able to have those other voices made it really special. The singer also stated that this album features "the most personal music" he has ever released.

During an interview with Jason Lipshutz for Billboard, Jonas talked about some of the songs from the album: "My Own Best Friend" was remarked as a "pleading anthem marked by mournful whistling", "Velvet Sunshine" was described by Lipshutz as a "fuzz-heavy synth workout", and "Hey Beautiful" was called by Jonas as a lullaby to his daughters. The first song Jonas worked on for the record was "Only Love", a "funked-up and flirtatious pop-rock jam" that was originally intended for the Jonas Brothers. Lipshutz further wrote that the record is "full of unvarnished thoughts and sonic experiments", with a shimmery pop sound that draws influence from genres like garage rock, alt-pop and 90s country, with lyrics about journaling through the uncertainties of life and finding gratitude amongst loss.

== Release and promotion ==
On July 17, 2024, Jonas confirmed the release of Music for People Who Believe in Love and revealed its cover artwork. The album was originally scheduled for October 18, 2024, but was subsequently postponed by Jonas, as he felt he wanted to "add some final touches" to the project. During JonasCon, a fan convention held by the Jonas Brothers to celebrate their 20th anniversary as a band, Jonas revealed the track list for the album. The album was released on May 23, 2025, via Republic Records.

On May 27, 2025, Jonas released a deluxe version of the album, which features the standard track list, a new song, titled "Water Under the Bridge", as well as new renditions of "Heart by Heart", "What This Could Be" and "Honey Blonde", taken from the singer's recent Vevo live session.

=== Singles ===
The lead single from the album, "Work It Out", was released on July 19, 2024. It was accompanied by the release of its lyric video. The song, produced by Jason Evigan and Kane Ritchotte, was called by People an "energetic personal anthem" due to its production and lyrical content. On the single's artwork cover, Jonas sports jeans, a denim jacket, with a red shirt underneath, and the background features a blue sky and two flowers out of focus and up close in the foreground.

On September 24, 2024, Jonas announced that "What This Could Be" was set to be released on October 4, serving as the second single from the album. The song was co-written by Jonas, Feist, and Dan Nigro and produced by the latter. Like with the previous single, "What This Could Be" was accompanied by the release of its lyric video. The song was described by People as featuring "guitar echoes over a soft beat and cinematic strings with the emotional lyrics". The lyrics feature an emotional approach, as the singer remembers a past relationship.

Jonas appeared at the Caracas Bakery in Miami, Florida, where he held a meet-and-greeting with fans, on April 16, 2025. During the event he announced that "Heart by Heart" would be released as the album's third single, on April 25. It was written by Lewis Capaldi, Oscar Holter, Savan Kotecha and Max Gsus and the lyrics has Jonas reflecting on a lost love with shimmering backdrop of keys and an acoustic guitar. The music video for the song, directed by Anthony Mandler and shot in New York City, was released on May 15.

=== Live shows ===
Banner for the free concert held by Joe Jonas at the Alhambra Theater, in Paris, on October 12, 2024.

On October 12, 2024, Jonas performed a free show in the Alhambra theater, in Paris. During the intimate sold-out performance, which was meant to showcase the songs from his album, the singer performed some then-unreleased songs such as "You Got the Right" and "Constellation", as well as a cover of Addison Rae's viral single, "Diet Pepsi". During the Paris performance, Jonas was joined on stage by French singer Louane, for a performance of "Hey Beautiful".

Through his Instagram account, Jonas announced that he intended to perform the new songs live for fans around the world. He asked them to fill a form in his official website to indicate which cities across the globe he should perform next. The most voted cities would be chosen to host the live performances.

On January 7, 2025, it was announced that Jonas, along with other artists, were to perform at Universal Orlando Resort for the 30 years of Mardi Gras celebration. The solo concert occurred on February 8, 2025, where the singer performed some songs from the album and also brought Ela Taubert out to perform "¿Como Pasó?" and a cover of Justin Bieber's song, "Love Yourself". On the same night, Jonas invited his youngest brother, Frankie Jonas, to perform a duet of the then-unreleased song "Velvet Sunshine". Finally, he invited Alex Warren to perform their duet, "Burning Down", which marked the song's first live performance.

== Critical reception ==
Professional ratings
Review scores
Source	Rating
AllMusic	4/5 stars

Music for People Who Believe in Love received mostly positive reviews from music critics. Writing for AllMusic, Matt Collar called the album a "thoughtfully mature amalgam" of Jonas' previous pop records, both solo and with groups. He highlighted the album's emotional core, with meaningful lyrics and an introspective mood, that showcases the experiences and maturity Jonas has gone though since the release of his previous record, Fastlife. Prelude Press' writer Dom Vigil complimented the team of producers on the album, naming it Jonas' "most personal, intimate, and heartfelt body of work to date". He deemed the song "Honey Blonde" a highlight due to its "lush instrumentation and breezy hook".

== Commercial performance ==
In the United States, Music for People Who Believe in Love debuted at number twenty four on the Billboard 200 chart, earning 17,000 pure album sales (including 4,000 vinyl copies) in its first week. The album also debuted at number three on Billboard's Top Album Sales chart, marking the singer's first top ten entry on the chart as a solo act.

== Track listing ==
Music for People Who Believe in Love track listing
No.	Title	Writer(s)	Producer(s)	Length
1.	"Woven" (featuring Domi and JD Beck)	Domi Louna; JD Beck	Domi and JD Beck	1:18
2.	"Parachute"	Joseph Jonas; Alexander 23; Justin Tranter; Paris Carney	Alexander 23	2:58
3.	"Work It Out"	Jonas; Jason Evigan; Kane Ritchotte; Bianca Atterberry; Victoria Evigan	J. Evigan^{[p]}; Ritchotte	2:30
4.	"Only Love"	Jonas; Alexander 23; Tranter; Beau Nox	Alexander 23	3:21
5.	"Heart by Heart"	Lewis Capaldi; Oscar Holter; Savan Kotecha; Max Grahn	Holter; Kotecha; Fat Max Gsus	3:10
6.	"Honey Blonde"	Jonas; Tommy English; Josette Maskin; Carney	English	3:18
7.	"My Own Best Friend"	Jonas; English; Carney	English	3:32
8.	"Velvet Sunshine" (featuring Frankie Jonas)	Jonas; Carney; Andrew Jackson; Jack LaFrantz; Mark Schick	Schick^{[p]}	2:06
9.	"Sip Your Wine" (featuring Sierra Ferrell)	Jonas; English; Carney	English	3:57
10.	"Hey Beautiful" (featuring Louane and Tiny Habits)	Jonas; Louane; Delacey Amaradio; Michael Coleman; James Ghaleb	Coleman; Valley Boy	3:25
11.	"What We Are" (featuring Luísa Sonza)	Jonas; Luísa Sonza; Alexander 23; Ghaleb	Alexander 23; Valley Boy	3:34
12.	"You Got the Right"	Jonas; Dan Wilson; English; Jeremy Hatcher	English; Hatcher	3:42
13.	"What This Could Be"	Jonas; Dan Nigro; Leslie Feist	Nigro	3:18
14.	"Constellation"	Jonas; Alexander 23; Ghaleb	Alexander 23; Hazey Eyes; Valley Boy^{[a]}	4:09
Total length:				44:18

Digital deluxe track listing
No.	Title	Writer(s)	Producer(s)	Length
15.	"Water Under the Bridge"	Jonas; Alexander 23; Sarah Aaron	Alexander 23; Hazey Eyes	2:13
16.	"Heart by Heart" (live from Vevo)	Capaldi; Holter; Kotecha; Grahn	Holter; Kotecha; Gsus	3:02
17.	"What This Could Be" (live from Vevo)	Jonas; Nigro; Feist	Nigro	2:57
18.	"Honey Blonde" (live from Vevo)	Jonas; English; Maskin; Carney	English	3:16
Total length:				55:46

Notes

- ^{^[p]} signifies a primary and vocal producer
- ^{^[a]} signifies an additional producer
- "Heart by Heart" is not featured on physical editions of the album.

== Personnel ==
=== Musicians ===
- Joe Jonas – vocals (all tracks), background vocals (13), guitar (16–18)
- Alexander 23 – background vocals, acoustic guitar, electric guitar, bass, synthesizer, synth bass (2, 4, 11, 14, 15); drums (4)
- Greg Garbowsky – drums (2)
- Thomas Hedlund – drums (2)
- Jason Evigan – guitar, bass, synthesizer, drum kit (3)
- Kane Ritchotte – guitar, synthesizer, drum kit (3)
- Blush – background vocals (3)
- Zane Carney – background vocals (3), guitar (6, 12, 16–18), electric guitar (15)
- Beau Nox – background vocals (4)
- Pete Jonas – electric guitar (4)
- Lewis Capaldi – guitar (5)
- Oscar Holter – bass, keyboard, drums (5)
- Fat Max Gsus – background vocals, guitar, bass, keyboard, drums (5)
- Tommy English – background vocals, synthesizer, synth bass (6, 7, 9, 12); baritone guitar, drums (6, 7, 9); 12-string acoustic guitar (6, 9); slide guitar (7, 9); acoustic guitar (7); percussion (9); shaker, mellotron (12)
- Josette Maskin – background vocals, slide guitar (6)
- Paris Carney – background vocals (6, 7, 9)
- Frankie Jonas – vocals (8)
- Mark Schick – background vocals, acoustic guitar, electric guitar, bass, keyboard (8)
- Andrew Jackson – background vocals (8)
- Jack LaFrantz – background vocals (8)
- Sierra Ferrell – vocals (9)
- Elias Mallin – drums (9)
- Louane – vocals (10)
- Tiny Habits – harmony vocals (10)
- Delacey – background vocals (10)
- Michael Coleman – bass, synthesizer (10)
- Valley Boy – background vocals, guitar (10)
- Luísa Sonza – vocals (11)
- James Ghaleb – background vocals, electric guitar (11, 14); acoustic guitar, synthesizer (11)
- Nathan East – bass (11, 15)
- Dan Wilson – nylon string guitar (12)
- Jeremy Hatcher – drums, synthesizer (12)
- Dan Nigro – background vocals, guitar, bass, piano, percussion, drum kit, synthesizer (13)
- Leslie Feist – background vocals (13)
- Jack Lawless – drums (14, 16–18)
- JinJoo Lee – electric guitar (14)
- Hazey Eyes – acoustic guitar, electric guitar, bass, synthesizer, synth brass (14, 15); drums, drum programming (15)
- Mark Joseph – background vocals (16–18)
- KellyeAnn Keough – background vocals (16–18)
- Tyler Carrol – bass (16–18)

=== Technical ===
- Mark "Spike" Stent – mixing (1–4, 6–12, 14)
- John Greenham – mastering (1–4, 6–12, 14)
- Domi Louna – recording (1)
- JD Beck – recording (1)
- Mikey Deleasa – vocal engineering (1); recording, second engineering (2)
- Alexander 23 – drum programming (2, 4, 11, 14)
- Eric Glauser – additional engineering (2)
- Deck D'arcy – additional engineering (2)
- Jess Camilleri – additional engineering (3, 13)
- Jason Evigan – engineering, vocal production (3)
- Kane Ritchotte – engineering (3)
- Oscar Holter – programming (5)
- Fat Max Gsus – programming (5)
- Șerban Ghenea – mixing (5)
- Chris Gehringer – mastering (5)
- Bryce Bordone – additional mixing (5)
- Oscar Holter – programming (5)
- Fat Max Gsus – programming (5)
- Tommy English – engineering (6, 7, 9, 12)
- Erik Belz – additional engineering (6, 7, 9, 12); recording, second engineering (10)
- Mark Schick – programming, vocal production (8)
- Michael Coleman – engineering (10)
- Chuck Hargreaves – additional engineering (10)
- Jeremy Hatcher – engineering (12)
- Dan Nigro – engineering (13)
- Mitch McCarthy – mixing (13)
- Brad Ritchie – additional engineering (14)
- Ed McEntee – additional engineering (14)
- Hazey Eyes – drum programming (14)
- Andy Hernandez – mixing (16–18)
- Dale Becker – mastering (16–18)

== Charts ==
Chart performance for Music for People Who Believe in Love
Chart (2025)	Peak position
Australian Albums (ARIA)	96
Belgian Albums (Ultratop Flanders)	55
Belgian Albums (Ultratop Wallonia)	81
German Albums (Offizielle Top 100)	92
Scottish Albums (Official Charts)	14
UK Albums Sales (OCC)	15
US Billboard 200	24

== Release history ==
Music for People Who Believe in Love release history
Region	Date	Format(s)	Edition(s)	Label	Ref.
Various	May 23, 2025	CD; digital download; streaming; vinyl LP	Standard	Republic	
United States	May 23, 2025	CD; vinyl LP	Target-exclusive	Republic	
United States	May 23, 2025	CD; vinyl LP	Special edition	Republic	
Various	May 27, 2025	Digital download; streaming	Deluxe	Republic	
