= What This Could Be =

2024 single by Joe Jonas

Single by Joe Jonas

from the album Music for People Who Believe in Love
- B-side: "Work It Out"
- Released: October 4, 2024
- Length: 3:18
- Label: Republic
- Songwriters: Joe Jonas; Dan Nigro; Leslie Feist
- Producer: Dan Nigro

Joe Jonas singles chronology
| "Thick of It All" (2024) | "What This Could Be" (2024) | "¿Cómo Pasó?" (2024) |

Lyric video
- "What This Could Be" on YouTube

"What This Could Be" is a song by American singer-songwriter Joe Jonas. It was released as the second single from his second studio album, Music for People Who Believe in Love, on October 4, 2024.

== Background ==
On September 24, 2024, Jonas announced that "What This Could Be" was set to be released on October 4, serving as the second single from the album.

== Composition and lyrics ==
The song was described by People as featuring "guitar echoes over a soft beat and cinematic strings with the emotional lyrics".

== Promotion ==
The song was released as the second single from Jonas' sophomore album, Music for People Who Believe in Love. Like with the previous single, "What This Could Be" was accompanied by the release of its lyric video.

== Credits and personnel ==
- Joe Jonas – vocals, songwriting
- Dan Nigro – songwriting, production
- Leslie Feist – songwriting

== Release history ==
Release history for "What This Could Be"
| Region | Date | Format | Label | Ref. |
|---|---|---|---|---|
| Various | October 4, 2024 | Digital download; streaming | Republic | |
