= Black Butterflies and Deja Vu =

- Acoustic version cover art

Single by The Maine

from the album Lovely Little Lonely
- Released: March 2, 2017
- Genre: Indie rock
- Length: 3:23
- Label: 8123
- Songwriters: Kennedy Brock; Pat Kirch; Jared Monaco; Garrett Nickelsen; John O'Callaghan
- Producer: Colby Wedgeworth

The Maine singles chronology
| "Bad Behaviour" (2017) | "Black Butterflies and Deja Vu" (2017) | "I Only Wanna Talk to You" (2017) |

"Black Butterflies and Deja Vu" is a song by American rock band, the Maine. It is the second single off their sixth studio album Lovely Little Lonely released on March 2, 2017, premiering on Nylon Magazine. It was released digitally the following day. An acoustic version was released on July 28, 2017.

== Background and composition ==
"Black Butterflies and Deja Vu" was written by members of the band and was produced by Colby Wedgeworth. The track runs at 168 BPM and is in the key of F major. It runs for three minutes and 23 seconds. Singer John O'Callaghan spoke about the origins of the song in an interview with Billboard.

"This song is for the moments, places, or persons that somehow turn your tongue to stone. Those times when words truly do not possess the power to adequately paint the subject. For me, this was written for an instance when the world was made clear to me for only an instant. When trouble faded into wonder, and I had absolutely no use for the 26 letters I know."

One of the fastest tracks in the band's discography, bassist Garrett Nickelsen told Nylon that the song was originally in the style of reggae. In another interview with PopCrush, O'Callaghan revealed that the song was the hardest one they have ever had to make. The band recorded the song in Gualala, California. Their single "Sticky" released in 2021, references lyrics to "Black Butterflies and Deja Vu". It is the bands most streamed song to date.

== Critical reception ==
"Black Butterflies and Deja Vu" was met with mostly positive reviews. Billboard complemented the instrumental work calling it, "a stunning blend of whirling guitars, propelled by Blink-182-esque drum beats." Alternative Press magazine described the track as "jaw dropping."

== Live performances ==
The band performed the song at Sad Summer Fest along with Grayscale singer, Collin Walsh in 2021. On September 29, 2025, the group joined the Jonas Brothers on their Jonas20: Greetings from Your Hometown Tour in Phoenix, Arizona, as a surprise guest performing the song.

== Track listing ==
Digital download
| No. | Title | Length |
|---|---|---|
| 1. | "Black Butterflies and Deja Vu" | 3:23 |

Acoustic version
| No. | Title | Length |
|---|---|---|
| 1. | "Black Butterflies and Deja Vu" (acoustic) | 3:48 |

== Credits and personnel ==
- John O'Callaghan – lead vocals
- Kennedy Brock – rhythm guitar, backing vocals
- Patrick Kirch – drums
- Jared Monaco – lead guitar
- Garrett Nickelsen – bass guitar
- Colby Wedgeworth – producer, mixing

== Release history ==
Release history for "Black Butterflies and Deja Vu"
| Region | Date | Format | Version | Label | Ref. |
|---|---|---|---|---|---|
| United States | March 2, 2017 | Alternative radio | Original | 8123 | |
| Various | March 3, 2017 | Digital download | Original | 8123 | |
| Various | July 28, 2017 | Digital download | Acoustic version | 8123 | |
