= Jojo =

Jojo, JoJo or Jo Jo is a given name, surname, nickname or stage name used by several people and fictional characters, including:

== People with the given name, nickname or stage name ==
=== Musicians ===
- JoJo (singer) (born 1990), American singer and actress
- Lil JoJo (1994–2012), American rapper
- Miss Jojo, Rwandan R&B singer Josiane Uwineza (born 1983)
- JoJo Billingsley (1952–2010), American singer, soloist and songwriter
- Jojo Garza, American musician, member of Los Lonely Boys
- JoJo Hailey (born 1971), American R&B singer Joel Hailey, half of K-Ci & JoJo and Jodeci
- John Hermann, American musician, keyboardist for Widespread Panic
- Joseph Hoo Kim (born 1942), Jamaican reggae record producer
- Jo Jo Laine (1953–2006), American singer, model, actress, and rock groupie
- Jojo Mason (born 1990), Canadian country music singer-songwriter
- Jojo Mayer (born 1963), Swiss drummer
- Jonathan Richman (born 1951), American proto-punk singer-songwriter
- Joseph Simmons (born 1964), stage name Rev. Run or DJ Run, a founding member of the hip hop group Run–D.M.C.
- JoJo Siwa (born 2003), American dancer, singer and actress
- Jojo Todynho (born 1997), Brazilian singer, television presenter and entrepreneur

=== Sportspeople ===
- JoJo (wrestling), American WWE ring announcer Joseann Alexie Offerman (born 1994)
- Jojó (born 1970), Mozambican footballer
- JoJo Dickson (born 1989), player in the Canadian Football League
- JoJo Domann (born 1997), American football player
- Jojo Duncil (born 1983), Philippine Basketball Association player
- Jo Jo English (born 1970), American National Basketball Association player
- Jojo Lastimosa (born 1964), Philippine Basketball Association player
- Jo-Jo Moore (1908–2001), American Major League Baseball player
- JoJo Polk (born 1978), American Arena Football League player
- Jo-Jo Reyes (born 1984), American Major League Baseball pitcher
- JoJo Romero (born 1996), American Major League Baseball pitcher
- JoJo Starbuck (born 1951), American figure skater
- Jojo Tangkay (born 1976), Philippine basketball player
- Jo-Jo Townsell (born 1960), American National Football League player, member of the Hall of Fame
- Jo Jo White (1946–2018), American basketball player
- Jo-Jo White (1909–1986), American baseball player
- Jonatan Christie (born 1997), Indonesian badminton player
- Jo Jo Pascua (born 1965), Filipino professional boxer
- Jójó (footballer, born 2001), Cape Verdean footballer

=== Other people ===
- Jo-Jo the Dog-Faced Boy, stage name of Fedor Jeftichew, Russian–American sideshow performer of the late 1800s
- Jawed Ahmad (1986–2009), Afghan reporter imprisoned by the American military in 2007, then released without explanation in 2008
- Jejomar Binay (born 1942), Philippine Vice-President and former mayor of Makati
- Jojo Chintoh (born c. 1944), Canadian television journalist
- JoJo Fletcher (born 1990), American reality TV star on The Bachelorette Season 12
- Jo Frost (born 1971), British nanny and TV personality of Supernanny fame, who addresses herself to children as "Jo-Jo"
- Jojo Lapus (1945–2006), Filipino show business columnist and screenwriter
- Jojo Moyes (born 1969), British romance novelist and journalist
- Paquito Ochoa, Jr. (born 1960), Filipino politician and lawyer
- JoJo Savard, Canadian self-proclaimed psychic
- JoJo Wright, American radio host
- Jojo Andrews (1956–1982), American professional wrestler
- Jo Jorgensen (born 1957), American political activist and academic, Libertarian Party candidate for the 2020 United States presidential election

== People with the surname ==
- Hideo Jojo (born 1975), Japanese film director and screenwriter
- Jōjō Masashige (1545–1643), Japanese samurai
- Shinji Jojo (born 1977), Japanese footballer

== Fictional characters with the name ==
- Joey Jo-Jo Junior Shabadoo, a minor character from The Simpsons animated sitcom ("The Last Temptation of Homer" episode)
- Jojo, a protagonist in the musical Seussical, as well as the book Horton Hears a Who!, on which the musical was partly based
- Jo Jo Dancer, the title character, played by Richard Pryor, in the film Jo Jo Dancer, Your Life Is Calling
- JoJo Tickle, main character of JoJo's Circus, an American children's television show
- Jojo, a food critic character in the Papa Louie games by Flipline Studios
- John Joseph "Jo Jo" McCann, main character of Looking After Jo Jo, a 1998 BBC Scotland television series
- Jojo Harte, on the Irish television series Raw (2008–2013)
- Mojo Jojo, a simian character in the American animated television show The Powerpuff Girls
- Every protagonist in the Japanese manga series JoJo's Bizarre Adventure
  1. Jonathan Joestar, the protagonist of Phantom Blood
  2. Joseph Joestar, the protagonist of Battle Tendency
  3. Jotaro Kujo, the protagonist of Stardust Crusaders
  4. Josuke Higashikata, the protagonist of Diamond is Unbreakable (the suke (助) in the Japanese name may also be pronounced as "Jo")
  5. Giorno Giovanna, the protagonist of Golden Wind (sometimes stylized as GioGio)
  6. Jolyne Cujoh, the protagonist of Stone Ocean
  7. Johnny Joestar, the protagonist of Steel Ball Run
  8. Josuke Higashikata, the protagonist of JoJolion (named after the previous protagonist of Diamond is Unbreakable)
  9. Jodio Joestar, the protagonist of The JOJOLands
- Jojo Khalastra, on The Comedy Store Israeli television show
- Jojo, in the Beatles song "Get Back"
- Jojo the Kissing Bandit, in the Avatar: The Last Airbender trading card game
- Granny Jojo Watterson, a pink rabbit character in the American animated television show The Amazing World of Gumball
- Jojo, main character of the Belgian comic series Jojo created by André Geerts
- Johannes "Jojo" Betzler, the young protagonist of Jojo Rabbit, a comedy-drama film
- JoJo, one of the titular characters in British TV series JoJo & Gran Gran
- Jojo, one of the students in animated TV series Ollie's Pack
- Jojo, from the Sonic the Hedgehog film series
- JoJo, the store mascot of Jewel-Osco
