= Heart by Heart (Joe Jonas song) =

2025 single by Joe Jonas

Single by Joe Jonas

from the album Music for People Who Believe in Love
- Released: April 25, 2025
- Length: 3:10
- Label: Republic
- Songwriters: Lewis Capaldi; Oscar Holter; Savan Kotecha; Max Grahn
- Producers: Holter; Kotecha; Fat Max Gsus

Joe Jonas singles chronology
"All I Forgot" (2025)	"Heart by Heart" (2025)

Music video
- "Heart by Heart" on YouTube

"Heart by Heart" is a song by American singer-songwriter Joe Jonas. It was released through Republic Records as the third single from his second studio album, Music for People Who Believe in Love, on April 25, 2025. Lewis Capaldi wrote the song with producers Oscar Holter, Savan Kotecha, and Fat Max Gsus. The official music video for the song was released on May 15, 2025.

== Background ==
Jonas appeared at the Caracas Bakery in Miami, Florida, where he held a meet-and-greeting with fans, on April 16, 2025. During the event he announced that "Heart by Heart" would be released as the album's third single, on April 25.

== Release ==
The song was released on April 25, 2025, serving as the third single for Jonas' sophomore album. The song was written by Lewis Capaldi, Oscar Holter, Savan Kotecha and Max Gsus and the lyrics has Jonas reflecting on a lost love with shimmering backdrop of keys and an acoustic guitar.

== Promotion ==
On April 24, 2025, Jonas performed the song at the Bleecker Street Bar, located in Lower Manhattan. The performance was filmed as part of a campaign partnership with Heineken. The singer also released a one-take live performance video, filmed in Los Angeles, at the Vevo studio.

The music video for the song, directed by Anthony Mandler and shot in New York City, was released on May 15, 2025.

== Composition and lyrics ==
According to Rolling Stone, the song has Jonas "reflecting on a love lost over a shimmering backdrop of acoustic guitar and keys".

== Credits and personnel ==
- Joe Jonas – vocals
- Lewis Capaldi – songwriting
- Oscar Holter – songwriting, production
- Savan Kotecha – songwriting, production
- Max Grahn – songwriting
- Fat Max Gsus – production

== Charts ==
Chart performance for "Heart by Heart"
Chart (2025)	Peak position
Costa Rica Anglo (Monitor Latino)	17
Panama Anglo Airplay (Monitor Latino)	13
US Adult Pop Airplay (Billboard)	35

== Release history ==
Release history for "Heart by Heart"
Region	Date	Format	Label	Ref.
Various	April 25, 2025	Digital download; streaming	Republic	
