= A Very Jonas Christmas Movie (soundtrack) =

A Very Jonas Christmas Movie (Original Soundtrack)

Soundtrack album by Jonas Brothers
- Released: November 14, 2025
- Length: 32:13
- Label: Hollywood; Republic
- Producer: Brandon Colbein; Daniel Crean; David Stewart; Eren Cannata; Gian Stone; Joe Jonas; Justin Tranter; Kevin Jonas; Luke Batt; Nick Jonas; Ryland Blackinton

Jonas Brothers chronology
Greetings from Your Hometown (2025)	A Very Jonas Christmas Movie (Original Soundtrack) (2025)	Friends from Your Hometown (2026)

Singles from A Very Jonas Christmas Movie (Original Soundtrack)
- 1. "Coming Home This Christmas" Released: November 3, 2025

A Very Jonas Christmas Movie (Original Soundtrack) is the fourth soundtrack album by the American pop rock band Jonas Brothers, serving as the accompanying soundtrack to the Christmas musical film of the same name. It was released on November 14, 2025, through Hollywood and Republic Records. The album contains guest appearances from Kenny G, and Chloe Bennet. Production was handled by the three brothers themselves, alongside Justin Tranter, Daniel Crean, Eren Cannata, Brandon Colbein, David Stewart, Luke Batt, Ryland Blackinton, and Gian Stone. The album was supported by the single, "Coming Home This Christmas", featuring Kenny G, released on November 3, 2025.

== Background ==
On November 8, 2019, the Jonas Brothers released a single, titled "Like It's Christmas", which would later appear on the soundtrack album to their Christmas movie, over six years after its release. On September 8, 2025, the Jonas Brothers announced they would release a Christmas themed album, as part of the soundtrack for a then yet-to-be-announced movie.

== Release ==
A Very Jonas Christmas Movie (Original Soundtrack) was released on November 14, 2025, through Hollywood and Republic Records. It serves as a companion to the film of the same name. It features guest appearances from Kenny G, Andrew Barth Feldman and Chloe Bennet, as well as seven original songs by the Jonas Brothers, including the single "Coming Home This Christmas".

== Promotion ==
On November 3, 2025, "Coming Home This Christmas", featuring the American smooth jazz saxophonist Kenny G, was released as a single, prior to the album's release. The official music video for the song was released on November 10, 2025.

== Critical reception ==
Writing for Collider, Isabella Soares named "Feel Something" as one of the best songs on the album, remarking its similarities with Camp Rock's duets.

== Track listing ==
All tracks are performed by the Jonas Brothers, except where noted.

A Very Jonas Christmas Movie (Original Soundtrack) track listing
No.	Title	Writer(s)	Producer(s)	Length
1.	"Like It's Christmas" (live version)	Nicholas Jonas; Joseph Jonas; Kevin Jonas II; Gian Stone; Jason Evigan; Freddy Wexler; Mike Elizondo; Annika Wells	J. Jonas; K. Jonas; N. Jonas	3:27
2.	"Best Night" (performed by Joe Jonas)	Justin Tranter; Daniel Crean; Eren Cannata; Brandon Colbein	Tranter; Crean; Cannata; Colbein	3:19
3.	"Coming Home This Christmas" (featuring Kenny G)	N. Jonas; J. Jonas; K. Jonas; Kenneth Gorelick; David Stewart; Luke Batt	Stewart; Batt	3:25
4.	"Home Alone" (performed by Nick Jonas and Andrew Barth Feldman)	Tranter; Cannata; Colbein	Tranter; Cannata; Crean	2:56
5.	"Feel Something" (performed by Joe Jonas and Chloe Bennet)	Tranter; Cannata; Ryland Blackinton; Colbein	Tranter; Cannata; Blackinton	3:09
6.	"Remember When"	Tranter; Crean; Cannata; Colbein	Tranter; Crean; Cannata	3:12
7.	"Better Off Alone"	Tranter; Crean; Cannata; Colbein	Tranter; Crean; Cannata	3:00
8.	"Time"	Tranter; Crean; Cannata; Colbein	Tranter; Crean; Cannata	3:14
9.	"Sucker" (live version)	N. Jonas; J. Jonas; K. Jonas; Ryan Tedder; Louis Bell; Mustafa Ahmed; Adam Feeney; Homer Steinweiss	J. Jonas; K. Jonas; N. Jonas	3:10
10.	"Like It's Christmas"	N. Jonas; J. Jonas; K. Jonas; Evigan; Wexler; Stone; Elizondo; Wells	Stone; Evigan^{[c]}; Wexler^{[c]}; Elizondo^{[c]}	3:21
Total length:				32:13

Notes

- ^{^[c]} signifies a co-producer

== Charts ==
Chart performance for A Very Jonas Christmas Movie
Chart (2025)	Peak position
Canadian Albums (Billboard)	58
UK Album Downloads (OCC)	94
US Billboard 200	52
US Soundtrack Albums (Billboard)	5
