= Work It Out (Joe Jonas song) =

2024 single by Joe Jonas

Single by Joe Jonas

from the album Music for People Who Believe in Love
- Released: July 19, 2024
- Length: 2:30
- Label: Republic
- Songwriters: Joe Jonas; Jason Evigan; Kane Ritchotte; Bianca Atterberry; Victoria Evigan
- Producers: J. Evigan; Ritchotte

Joe Jonas singles chronology
"Not Alone" (2022)	"Work It Out" (2024)	"Thick of It All" (2024)

Lyric video
- "Work It Out" on YouTube

"Work It Out" is a song by American singer-songwriter Joe Jonas. It was released through Republic Records on July 19, 2024, as the lead single from his second studio album, Music for People Who Believe in Love (2025). Jonas wrote the song with producers Victoria and Jason Evigan, alongside Kane Ritchotte and Blush.

Jonas released a remix of the song in collaboration with his band DNCE, on September 20, 2024, and a second remix, in collaboration with his brother-in-law, American DJ Deleasa, on October 25, 2024.

== Background ==
On May 29, 2024, Jonas began teasing new solo material through TikTok, releasing the snippet of the song. The singer revealed he was both "excited and emotional" to be sharing this new material, stating he got to work some of his favorite artists and producers.

== Composition and lyrics ==
Following the release of the teases, the lyrics "even baddies get saddies", taken from "Work It Out", sparkled discussion amongst the media on the possible references to Joe and Sophie Turner's divorce. Jonas explained that this single helped him find a "sense of belonging and security", which made the production time a lot quicker, with the song coming together in approximately one hour.

== Promotion ==
The song was released as the lead single from Jonas' sophomore album, Music for People Who Believe in Love.

The song was used in an episode of Claim to Fame, hosted by Jonas's brothers, Kevin & Franklin.

== Credits and personnel ==
- Joe Jonas – vocals, songwriting
- Jason Evigan – songwriting, production
- Kane Ritchotte – songwriting, production
- Bianca Atterberry – songwriting
- Victoria Evigan – songwriting

== Release history ==
Release history for "Work It Out"
Region	Date	Format	Label	Ref.
Various	July 19, 2024	Digital download; streaming	Republic	
Italy	September 6, 2024	Radio airplay	Universal	
