= Coming Home This Christmas =

2025 single by Jonas Brothers featuring Kenny G

Single by Jonas Brothers featuring Kenny G

from the album A Very Jonas Christmas Movie
- Released: November 3, 2025
- Length: 3:25
- Label: Hollywood; Republic
- Songwriters: Nicholas Jonas; Joseph Jonas; Kevin Jonas II; Kenneth Gorelick; David Stewart; Luke Batt
- Producers: Stewart; Batt

Jonas Brothers singles chronology
"Happen to Me" (2025)	"Coming Home This Christmas" (2025)	"Cliché" (Jonas Brothers remix) (2025)

Kenny G singles chronology
"More than Anybody" (2025)	"Coming Home This Christmas" (2025)	"Cry" (2026)

Music video
- "Coming Home This Christmas" on YouTube

"Coming Home This Christmas" is a song by the American pop rock group Jonas Brothers featuring the American smooth jazz saxophonist Kenny G. It was released through Hollywood and Republic Records as a single from their soundtrack album, A Very Jonas Christmas Movie, on November 3, 2025. The three band members, Nick, Joe, and Kevin Jonas, wrote the song with Kenny G and producers David Stewart and Luke Batt.

== Background ==
On September 8, 2025, the Jonas Brothers announced they would release a Christmas themed album, as part of the soundtrack for a then yet-to-be-announced movie.

== Release ==
On November 3, 2025, "Coming Home This Christmas", featuring Kenny G, was released as a single, prior to the release of the soundtrack album, A Very Jonas Christmas Movie.

== Music video ==
The Jonas Brothers released the official music video for the song on November 10, 2025. The video features the scene stripped from the movie and sees the brothers breaking into a song on a train station, with an appearance from Kenny G.

== Charts ==
Chart performance
Chart (2025)	Peak position
US Adult Contemporary (Billboard)	7
Uruguay Anglo Airplay (Monitor Latino)	10

== Release history ==
Release history
Region	Date	Format	Label	Ref.
Various	November 3, 2025	Digital download; streaming	Hollywood; Republic	
Italy	December 5, 2025	Radio airplay	Universal	
