= JoJo Savard =

Canadian psychic

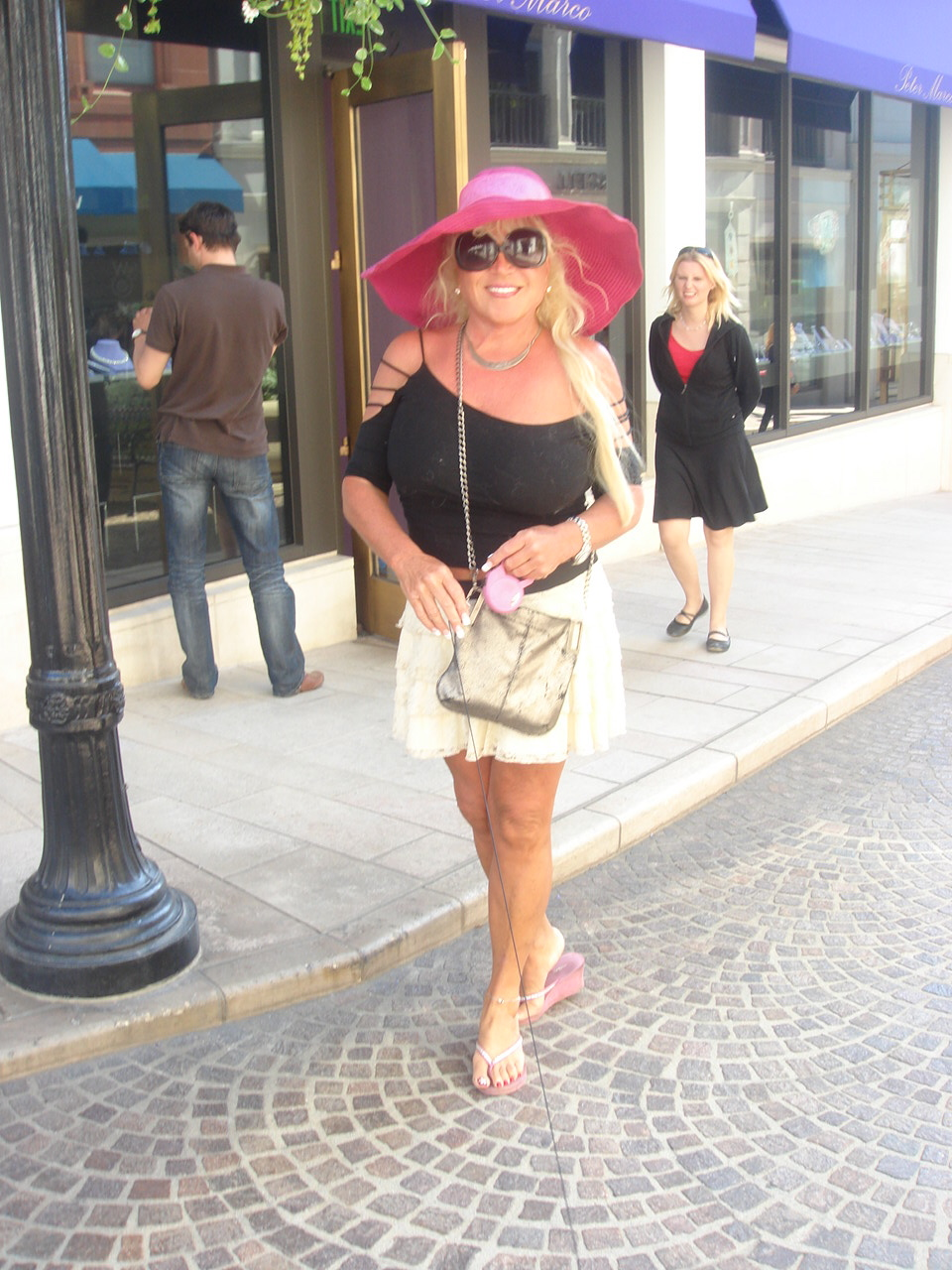
- Savard in 2014
- Born: Quebec City, Quebec, Canada
- Occupation: TV personality / psychic
- Years active: 1985–present
- Notable credit: JoJo Live CFCF-DT host (1988 - 2003) Café Show TVA (Canada) co-host (1988-1994) Via Quebec TVA (Canada) co-host (1989-1992) Salut Bonjour TVA (Canada) Breakfast television columnist (1992-1995)
- Website: jojosavard.com

JoJo Savard is a former French-Canadian television psychic who gained popularity during the early 1990s.

She began her media career in 1981 in Vancouver, being regularly featured on the Tomorrow’s Fortune television program. Her popularity blossomed in the early 1990s with a short TV astrology segment called 'Jocelyne', which was aired between television shows on CFCF-TV in Montreal.

With Savard's popularity rising, she shifted her focus in 1994 and began the popular Jojo's Psychic Alliance telemarketing hotline across Canada. Her infomercial was featured on French and English television. Subsequently, Savard went under contract to the Miami-based telemarketing firm Ormazd Inc., to host an American-based astrology hotline called The Power of Love in the United States.

Her pay per call phone line reached 2,000 calls per day at its peak.
