= Caracas Bakery =

Bakery in Florida, U.S.

Coordinates: 25.8421°N 80.1843°W

- Interactive map of Caracas Bakery

Restaurant information
- Location: Florida, United States
- Website: caracasbakery.com

Caracas Bakery is a bakery in Florida, in the United States.

== Reception ==
In 2024, the business was included in The New York Times's list of the 22 best bakeries in the U.S.

== See also ==
- List of bakeries
