= Media portrayals of transgender people =

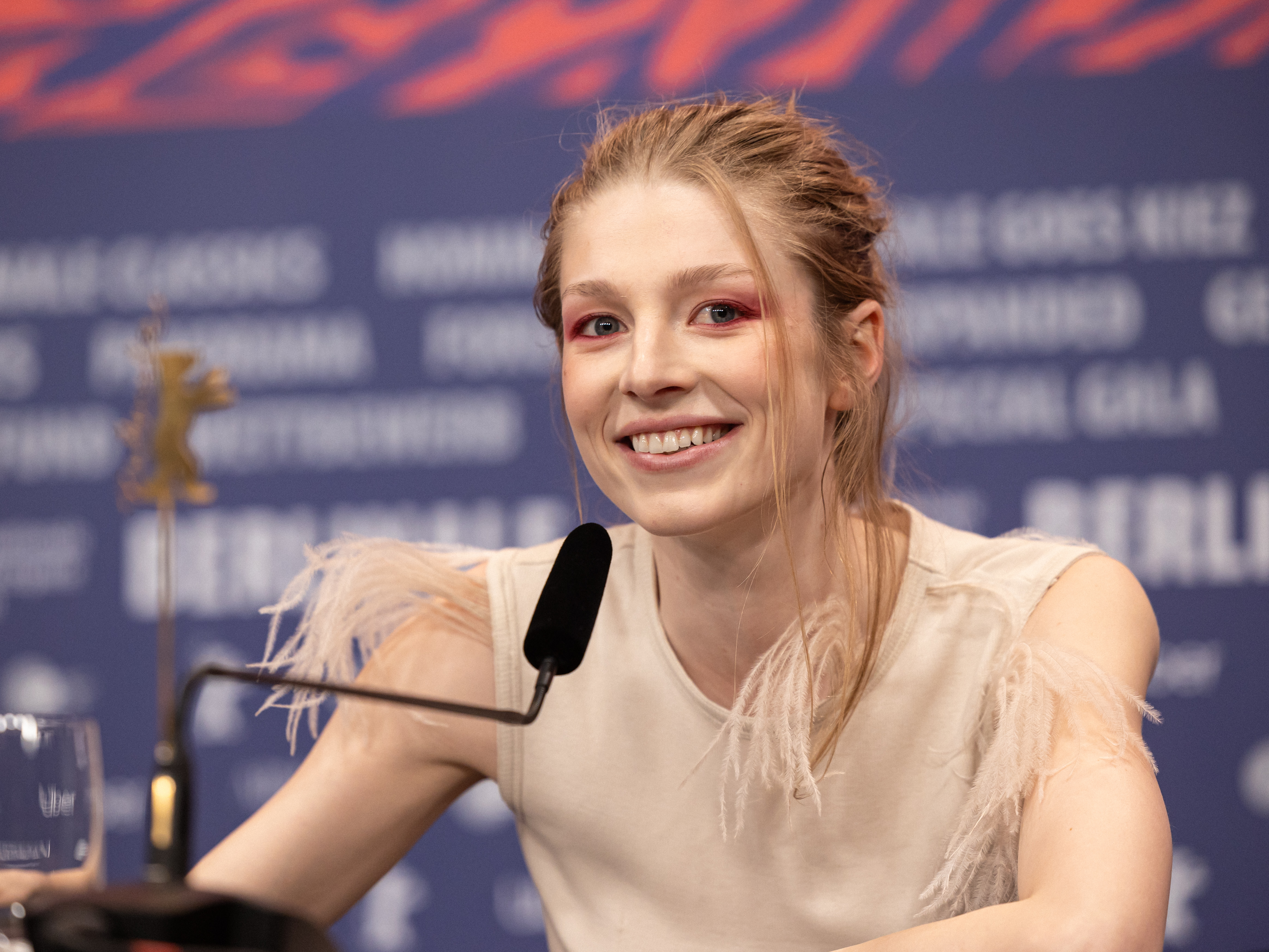
Hunter Schafer's role as transgender teen Jules Vaughn in Euphoria (2019–2026) garnered critical acclaim.

Portrayals of transgender people in mass media reflect societal attitudes about transgender identity, and have varied and evolved with public perception and understanding. Media representation, culture industry, and social marginalization all hint at popular culture standards and the applicability and significance to mass culture, even though media depictions represent only a minuscule spectrum of the transgender group, which essentially conveys that those that are shown are the only interpretations and ideas society has of them. However, in 2014, the United States reached a "transgender tipping point", according to Time. At this time, the media visibility of transgender people reached a level higher than seen before. Since then, the number of transgender portrayals across TV platforms has stayed elevated. Research has found that viewing multiple transgender TV characters and stories improves viewers' attitudes toward transgender people and related policies.

== Historically ==
Transgender identity was discussed in the mass media as long ago as the 1930s. Time magazine in 1936 devoted an article to what it called "hermaphrodites", treating the subject with sensitivity and not sensationalism. It described the call by Avery Brundage, who led the American team to the 1936 Summer Olympics in Berlin, that a system be established to examine female athletes for "sex ambiguities"; two athletes changed sex after the Games.

Christine Jorgensen was a transgender woman who received considerable attention in American mass media in the 1950s. Jorgensen was a former G.I. that went to Denmark to receive sex reassignment surgery. Her story appeared in publications including Time and Newsweek. Other representations of transgender women appeared in mainstream media in the 1950s and 1960s, such as Delisa Newton, Charlotte Frances McLeod, Tamara Rees, and Marta Olmos Ramiro, but Jorgensen received the most attention. Her story was sensationalized, but received positively. In comparison, news articles about Newton, McLeod, Rees, and Ramiro had negative implications.

== Literature ==
In February 2016, John Hansen of The Guardian noted that for the past few years, "YA and middle grade books with trans main characters remain sorely lacking", and as such Hansen pointed to ten transgender authors who have trans characters in their novels. Even so, Dahlia Adler of Barnes & Noble noted that literature with transgender protagonists is quickly evolving with more "trans authors in the spotlight". Christina Orlando of Book Riot wrote that one of the biggest caps in the publishing industry is "transgender fiction about the trans experience", further stating that "trans stories always seem to be a second thought", pushed aside so that other "palatable narratives" can take its place. Additionally, Hannah Weiss of Insider wrote, in 2020, that readers can find a "find a vast variety of fantasy and sci-fi stories" which star non-binary and trans characters, most of which are written by trans people.

Reviewers for The Guardian, Barnes & Noble, Insider, and Book Riot highlight some of the same books with transgender characters. These include Everett Maroon's The Unintentional Time Traveler (2014), Pat Schmatz's Lizard Radio (2015), Meredith Russo's If I Was Your Girl (2016), April Daniels' Dreadnought (2017), Anna-Marie McLemore's When the Moon Was Ours (2016), C. B. Lee's Not Your Villain (2017). Barnes & Noble further points to Matthew J. Metzger's Spy Stuff (2016) while Insider highlights Akwaeke Emezi's Pet (2019), Rich Larson's Annex (2018), Amy Rose Capetta's The Brilliant Death (2018), and a collection of stories titled All Out: The No-Longer-Secret Stories of Queer Teens throughout the Ages (2018) which are edited by Saundra Mitchell. Book Riot and The Guardian listed 12 other books with transgender characters and themes. (Note: They were Jennifer Finney Boylan's Long Black Veil, Casey Plett's Little Fish, Imogen Binnie's Nevada, Austin Chant's Peter Darling, Jia Qing Wilson-Yang's Small Beauty, Ivan Coyote's One in Every Crowd, I merey's A + E 4ever, Rae Spoon's First Spring Grass Fire, Kate Bornstein's Hello, Cruel World, Michael Grant's "Monster" series, Sassafras Lowrey's Roving Pack, Elliott DeLine's I Know Very Well How I Got My Name, and Alex Gino's George.)

== Painting ==
The portrayal of transgender people in painting is difficult to identify because painting is a visual art in which the viewer is only able know what the eye can see, especially in earlier times due to the lack of openness and terminology in society. It is hard to determine a transgender individual in a painting because the genitals, the fundamental feature that doctors use to assign biological sex, are oftentimes not depicted. Before the 20th century, visual representations of cross-dressing were extremely rare and scarce information is known about individuals who broke gender norms in earlier eras; the LGBTQ movement had not happened and LGBTQ+ individuals were not as widely accepted in Western culture. Portrayals of non-conforming in visual art forms have been around forever, and these art forms are increasingly becoming more accepted and visible in society.

According to David Getsy, an art history professor at the School of the Art Institute of Chicago, "The historical record has so little in it around evidence of transgender lives – or what we would now call transgender lives – and the evidence we do have is couched in oppression and negativity". He also considers the one story narrative of history that erases evidence of oppressed identities and how the limited evidence that we do have of such works is just a piece of a greater archival records that have been lost.

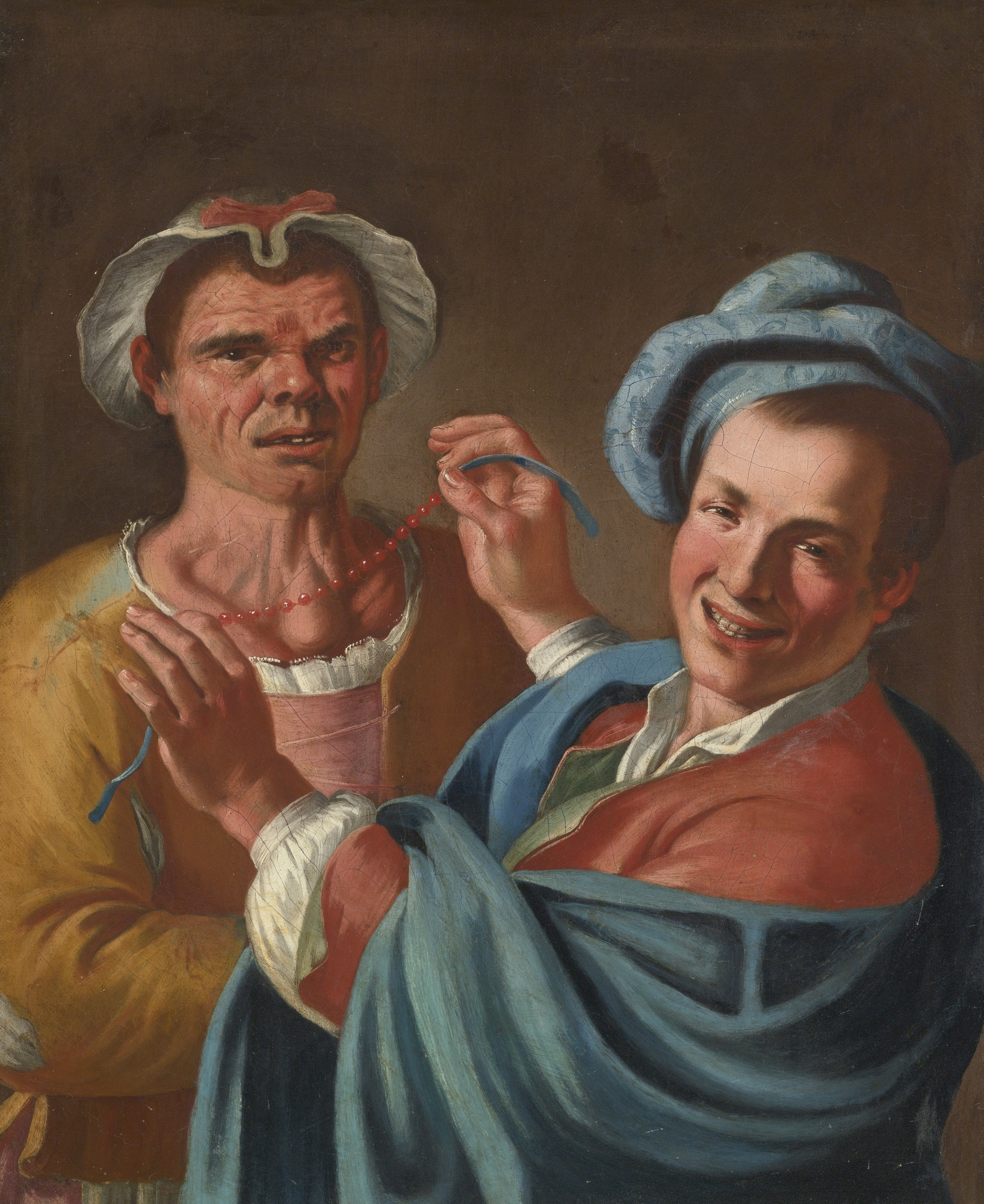
"II Femminiello" by Giuseppe Bonito, 1740-1760, oil on canvas, 77.1 by 63.2 cm

The oil on canvas "Alonso Díaz de Guzmán" c. 1626, attributed to Juan van der Hamen could be considered one of the first "trans" portraits in the history of Baroque art. The painting was a depiction of Alonso Díaz de Guzmán, born as a girl with the name Catalina de Erauso. Erauso wrote an autobiography, telling the story of his lived experience as a young girl, dressed as a man, who ran away from his convent, ultimately how Erauso was given the nickname "Lieutenant Nun". Art collective Cabello/Carceller has attempted to accumulate different visual media with the goal of challenging the heteronormative representations in visual culture since 1992 and created a "new" portrait of Erauso. The exhibition, an analogue-digital portrait gallery, featuring the painting by Cabello/Carceller as well as the historical portraits dating back to 1625, was on view in Akuna Zentro in 2022.

Displayed in the Portland Art Museum and seen as one of the earliest paintings of gender fluidity painted sometime between 1740–1760, Giuseppe Bonito's "II Femminiello" is a medium oil on canvas measuring 77.1 by 63.2 centimeters. "Femminielli" was directly translated to "little female-men" to refer to cross-dressers in 18th century Italian society. The term was associated with the "third sex" and was accepted by society, even used with endearment toward these cross-dressers, mostly coming from poverty stricken neighborhoods that were seen to bring good luck, combining the strength of both males and females. The term "femminiello" is not to be directly compared to the term transgender but as a separate somewhat parallel term used in Italian culture. Known to work in the genre "pittora ridicula" (ridiculous paintings), Bonito's intentions of his depiction of the "femminiello" is unclear. According to Sotheby, "in these pictures, artists chose subjects from the lower classes and depicted them in mildly amusing ways or situation, and often with moralizing overtones".

Early portrayals of non-conforming in paintings not only appeared in Western paintings but also from all other places. Hosoda Eisui's "Wakashu with a Shoulder-Drum" (1769–1770) is a notable piece that has only recently received recognition. "Wakashu" were recognized as their own gender, determined by sex, age, physical appearance, and the role they played in the sexual hierarchy that was present in the Edo Period. In art, they were portrayed as indeterminable gendered people, but in real life, they were seen as desirable to both men and women. The term described males who had not completed the "genpuku", the Japanese coming-of-age traditional ritual who were oftentimes identified by their hairstyle, "a slightly shaven crown flanked by side locks", which differed from a man who would have no crown, only featuring side locks. During the Edo period (1603–1868), gender was not binary in Japan, and gender dynamics were also influenced by age and appearance, not just sex. However, since the making of this painting and the 1700s, gender relationships have changed in Japan due to Western colonization during the late 19th century. At the Royal Ontario Museum, "Wakashu with a Shoulder-Drum" was displayed from May 27 to November 27, 2016 in "A Third Gender: Beautiful Youths in Japanese Edo-Period Prints and Paintings", the first exhibition in North America to highlight gender dynamics, featuring the Wakashu, in the Edo Period of Japan.

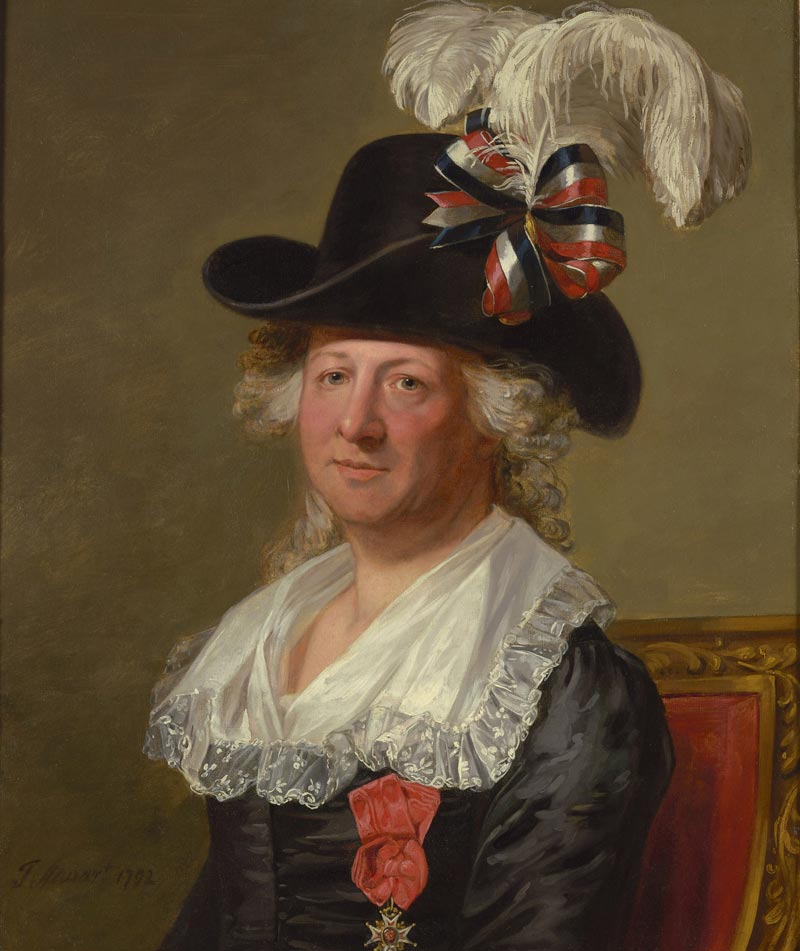
"Chevalier d' Eon" by Thomas Stewart, after Jean Laurent Mosnier 1792

"Chevalier d'Eon" originally painted by French artist Jean-Laurent Mosnier (1743–1808) and presented at the Royal Academy in 1791, was recreated by Thomas Stuart. The painting portrayed Chevalier d'Eon, born as Charles Geneviève Louis Auguste André Timothée d'Éon de Beaumont. Despite conservative gender norms in the 18th century, she was accepted as a woman into society, serving the King and playing a key role in negotiating peace that ended the Seven Years War.

Ria Brodell's 2016 piece "Captain Wright" c. 1834, gouache on paper at 11 by 17 inches is featured in the collection at the Davis Museum at Wellesley College. Mr. Wright and his wife lived at Kennington Lane with a respectable reputation, known for his jovial personality, love for rabbits, and frequent presence at the nearby pubs. On Sunday, December 14, 1834, an extraordinary discovery was published in the London newspaper, The Bell's New Weekly Messenger; Mr. Wright's body, examined after his death, had possessed woman genitalia, marking his biological sex as female. Mr. Wright was referred to as a "creature" in the article, and people speculated the motivation behind his identity. Ria Brodell created a series of paintings called "Butch Heroes", attempting to reveal names in our history "who were assigned female at birth but whose gender presentation was more masculine than feminine". Brodell highlights, "[t]hough some could be identified today with the terms 'lesbian,' 'transgender,' 'nonbinary,' 'genderqueer,' etc., these myriad LGBTQIA terms were not available to them during their lifetimes. Since it is impossible to know exactly how each person would self-identify using today's terminology, I view this project as an ongoing effort to document a shared history within the LGBTQIA community".

== Comics and manga ==
According to a study by Erik Melander in 2005, at least 25% of webcomic creators were female. This percentage was significantly larger than the number of successful women creating print comics at the time, and the number may have been even higher, as a certain percentage of contributors were unknown. In 2015, 63% of the top 30 comic creators on webcomic conglomerate Tapas were female. In 2016, 42% of the webcomic creators on Webtoon were female, as was 50% of its 6 million active daily readers. Girls with Slingshots creator Danielle Corsetto stated that webcomics are probably a female-dominated field because there is no need to go through an established publisher. ND Stevenson, creator of Nimona and Lumberjanes, noticed that webcomics predominantly feature female protagonists, possibly to "balance out" the content of mainstream media. Corsetto noted that she has never encountered sexism during her career, though Stevenson described some negative experiences with Reddit and 4chan, websites outside of their usual channels. However, there exist a large amount of openly gay and lesbian comic creators that self-publish their work on the internet. These include amateur works, as well as more "mainstream" works, such as Kyle's Bed & Breakfast. According to Andrew Wheeler from ComicsAlliance, webcomics "provide a platform to so many queer voices that might otherwise go undiscovered", and Tash Wolfe of The Mary Sue has a similar outlook on transgender artists and themes.

Within The Transformers comic book series by IDW Publishing, the Transformer Arcee is a transgender lesbian. Initially introduced as being the result of unnatural experimentation, later storylines had the character embrace her identity as a transgender Transformer and portray her identity in a more positive light. DC Comics introduced Alysia Yeoh as the first major transgender character written in a contemporary context in a mainstream comic book. She is a fictional character created by writer Gail Simone for the Batgirl ongoing series, and is Barbara Gordon's best friend, and a transgender woman. They went on to premiere the first ever transgender wedding in Batgirl #45. Marvel Comics has followed suit, with writer Al Ewing adapting popular character Loki to have a fluid gender identity.

Transgender themes are also found in manga. One notable example is Wandering Son, which deals with issues such as being transgender, gender identity, and the beginning of puberty. Gary Groth of Fantagraphics Books said in an interview he licensed Wandering Son because "it's not a typical choice for a manga title published in the U.S. and it's not typical subject matter for comics in general", saying that the subject is "perfectly legitimate ... for literature—or comics". Web comics have also included trans characters, with award-winning series Questionable Content adding trans woman Claire Augustus in comic 2203. In the manga Fire Punch by Tatsuki Fujimoto, the character Togata has received praise for being an accurate portrayal of a transgender character with his gender dysphoria being a defining part of his characterization.

== Film ==
=== Asia ===
Bao Hongwei, Media Studies professor at the University of Nottingham, identified the 1990s as a formative decade for transgender representation in mainland Chinese film. During this time, the rise of independent film allowed for a “coming out” of queer and transgender characters in film. Bao states that independent filmmakers during the Sixth Generation and with the New Documentary Movement encountered cross-dressing performers working in urban Chinese bars, inspiring filmmakers to create films centered around gender-nonconforming people.

BAFTA nominated film producer, Elhum Shakerifar, has examined how transgender identities are portrayed in Iranian film. Shakerifar argues that sex reassignment is often depicted as a “loophole” for queer representations within Iranian media. Shakerifar further elaborates that Western media has developed a fascination with Iran’s depictions of sex changes and often rely on the “shock” of a conservative Islamic state permitting such operations. They continue by stating that some Iranian filmmakers deliberately shape representations either to appeal to Western audiences or promote specific political agendas. Films such as Nature’s Humour (2006) sought to open the eyes of parliament members on transgender issues in Iran. Shakerifar critiques how films have privileged medical transitions rather than giving transgender individuals moments to express their voice.

Mohamed Rashid VP, Sourav V & Bangalore Morarji, scholars at University of Hyderabad and Vellore Institute of Technology, analyze how transgender representation in Malayalam cinema has evolved from comedic stereotypes towards more nuanced and empathetic portrayals. They argue that films like Randu Penkuttikal (1978) used comedic stereotypes, while films like Soothradharan (2001) depicted a transgender character in a “double life”, which reinforces transgender people as deceitful and inauthentic. They noted that over time, representation shifted, such as the film Aalorukkam (2018), which centers on Priyanka, a transgender woman, who deals with exile and family reconciliation in a more realistic portrayal. Using Stuart Hall’s representation theory, the authors argue that early portrayals were heavily stereotyped and hypersexualized, but more recent films use discourse from local media and legal reforms to present transgender characters with empathy and realism. Additionally, they draw attention to how criminalization of transgender lives in Indian law influenced film narratives and how legislative changes have created a space for more respectful storytelling.

=== North America ===
Early representation of transgender and gender variant characters were often dictated by social codes and acceptance of their time. In the United States, portrayals from the 1960s and 70s depicted transgender women as deceptive, dangerous, or tragic figures. In 2017, Nikki Reitz of Grand Valley State University notes that films in the 2010s have served to center transgender characters within cisgender character’s life stories, or been portrayed by cisgender actors. Professor Traci B. Abbott argues that the apparent progress of the 2010s has produced racialized and normative hierarchies rather than attempting to dismantle them. Long Tran, Media Studies scholar at the University of Washington, situated these depictions within a larger queer film history, stating that Hollywood’s portrayal of transgender characters provides needed moments of visibility, but often has centered moments of tragedy.

Traci B. Abbott, professor in English and Media Studies at Bentley College, situates an initial study of transgender representations in the 1960s. Abbott notes that characters during 1965 to 1980s were solely played by white cisgender male actors, and were only played by non-white actors when hypersexualizing sex workers such as in the film Riot (1969). Abbott states that mainstream American cinema connected gender variance with criminality and psychological instability. Films such as Psycho (1960) and Dressed to Kill (1980) reinforced what Abbott identifies as the “trans killer” stereotype, implying that transgender feminine figures are threats to the social order. Abbott argues that these portrayals, often centered for cisgender audiences, conflate transgender identity as a spectacle and affirm a rigid gender binary. Abbott states that this created a pattern of representation that persisted into the following decades. In the 1980s, writer, filmmaker, and actor Jake Graf said that he couldn't "find himself in any of the TV or film characters he saw" and called the worst manifestation of this was in the film Boys Don't Cry (1999).

Southern Comfort (2001) is a documentary film, directed by Kate Davis, that goes over the life of a transgender man, Robert Eads. As a transgender man, Robert was denied health care for his ovarian cancer because doctors were afraid their reputation would be negatively affected. The film being a documentary accentuates the factuality of the discrimination transgender people go through. The film took the audience through the life of Robert Eads– it showed his family, "chosen" family and his battle with ovarian cancer. His chosen family were his friends that he considered to be family. Due to the denial of attention to his ovarian cancer, Robert Eads died. By walking through Robert's life the audience is introduced to the various struggles that transgender people may face. This documentary film mainly focused on the struggles transgender people face in the healthcare system. The recognition of these issues advocated for change by displaying the prejudice and discrimination faced by transgender people in the healthcare system.

In February 2006, Logo aired Beautiful Daughters, a documentary film about the first all-trans cast of The Vagina Monologues (1996), which included Addams, Lynn Conway, Andrea James, and Leslie Townseand directed by Josh Aronson and Ariel Orr Jordan. Also in 2006, Lifetime aired a movie biography on the murder of Gwen Araujo called A Girl Like Me: The Gwen Araujo Story.

Additionally, in 2017 Jake Graf, a trans filmmaker released a short film called Dusk, which tells the story of a transgender man from his childhood through adulthood. The film highlights the struggles trans men go through with transitioning and the lack of resources and acceptance in society available to them. Chris, in the film, meets a dream woman named Julie, but struggles with self-identity and how life could be different. One of the struggles depicted is how gender roles are critiqued and expected in a closed society. Ultimately, the film ends with Chris being old with Julie and still in their romantic relationship, which helps Chris understand that some questions in life have no answers or right ones which make us who we are.

In 2013, GLAAD noted a number of films which they felt had positive transgender representation. The organization specifically listed The World According to Garp (1982), Second Serve (1986), The Adventures of Priscilla, Queen of the Desert (1994), My Life in Pink (Ma Vie en Rose) (1997), Southern Comfort (2001), Normal (2003), and Transamerica (2005). Bustle also argued that TransAmerica had positive depiction of transgender people.

Nikki Reitz further examined transgender representation in film and television in an article in the journal, Cinesthesia. Reitz details that often trans women are cast as villains in film and television, citing examples of bad representation in the films Sleepaway Camp (1983) and Silence of the Lambs (1991), and further criticizing TV shows such as Law & Order (1990–2010), CSI (2000–2015), NCIS (2003–Present), and The Closer (2005–2012) as doing the same thing. Reitz further criticized the practice of "casting cisgender men in the roles of trans women", in films such as The Danish Girl (2015) and Dallas Buyers Club (2013), while saying that often lauded characters in Orange Is the New Black (2013–2019) and Tangerine (2015) fall into existing tropes, though the film Boy Meets Girl (2014) does not, for the most part. Reitz concluded that casting trans actors and actresses to portray transgender characters will "slow the perpetuation of negative stereotypes of trans people" and will cause public opinion of trans women to improve, along with the "quality of life" for such individuals.

In 2012, PhD student Jeremy Russell Miller argued in his dissertation, Crossdressing cinema: an analysis of transgender representation in film, that there should also be an emphasis on the recurring issue of the use of Transgender characters in comedic films. There has been a constant theme or trend of utilizing male characters dressed as women for comedic effect. In award-winning films such as Victor/Victoria (1982), Some Like It Hot (1952), and Big Momma's House (2000), there is an implication of having male-identifying actors become and act as female characters to bring a focus of laughter. Each film grossed over $20 million and won an Oscar over ten other nominated films. Miller's argument highlights the fact that profit is made from the humiliation of the display of transgender people. They are often used as the butt of the joke and made into objects to ridicule. While comedies should be taken lightly and not seriously, they should still be called out for how damaging it can be to associate transgender people as subjects of laughter. Further, films such as Mrs. Doubtfire (1993) and 100 Girls (2000) invalidate the process of transitioning that display heteronormative privileges that cisgender men have over transgender people. As these movies cut from a character being one gender to another, it allows for each character to keep their heteronormative identities. This helps preserve their privilege of being heteronormative.

Yolanda Mercader Martinez, professor at the Universidad Autónoma Metropolitana Xochimilco, states within Mexican film in the early 2000s, stories began to shift away from stereotypical and comedic portrayals of transgender individuals. Mercader Martinez states that independent filmmakers began centering trans* and travesti characters, primarily during the years 2005-2016. Films such as Muxes (2005), Morir de pie (2011), Quebranto (2013), and Carmin Tropical (2014) were influential in portraying transgender lead character fighting against discrimination, precarious labor, and developing their own gender expressions, often based in Mexican regional and indigenous practices. Mercader Martinez argues that these films have shifted away from earlier uses of cross-dressing as comic relief and instead highlight the authentic life experiences of transgender and gender nonconforming individuals throughout Mexico.

During the four-year period of 2017–2020, GLAAD's annual Studio Responsibility Index found that major studios had produced no films with transgender or non-binary characters. However, in March 2021, Patti Harrison became the "first known trans actor to voice a character in a Disney animated movie", specifically Raya and the Last Dragon.

In March 2022, Professor Cáel M. Keegan argued against the idea that more favorable media portrayals of transgender people could greatly change how they were treated within society. In his article for Film Quarterly, he discussed how popular portrayals end up overshadowing more nuanced or unconventional depictions, thus becoming more "assimilative" than revolutionary. In light of this issue, Keegan suggested that portrayals commonly considered to be aversive (or "'bad' trans object[s]") might actually be better equipped to produce thought-provoking depictions because they "cannot fit within the aesthetic system" at all. While examining the films Tootsie (1982), It's Pat (1994), and The Assignment (2016), Keegan also attempted to vindicate their controversial portrayals of transgender people by claiming that their uncomfortable natures "point to...broader vision[s] for trans politics" overall.

In July 2026, an annual report published by GLAAD found no trans characters in any of 225 films released by 10 major distributors in 2025. In November 2026 interviews with The Guardian, trans and non-binary actors including Trace Lysette, Vico Ortiz, and Rebecca Root noted a sharp decline in on-screen representation since 2024.

=== South America ===
Professor Angela Mooney of Texas Woman’s University states that films from the 2010s in Brazil have provided joyful representations of transgender life. Mooney highlights films like Alice Junior (2019) and Valentina (2020) as shifting narratives away from just coming out stories and instead providing comprehensive views on the lives of transgender people. These contemporary films have been able to stray away from using trans* and travesti characters as comedic element that was prevalent in the 1970s and 1980s.

In their 2018 PhD dissertation at the University of Ottawa, Javier Enrique Garcia Leon argues that Venezuelan transgender cinema is a site where transgender identities are positioned in relation to politics, race, and social precarity. Garcia Leon states that such as Pelo Malo (2013) and Cheila, una casa pa maita (2010) within state-sponsored and independent productions that narrate the lives of transfeminine figures under the Bolivarian government. Garcia Leon states that these films frequently showcase the effects of racialization and poverty. Documentaries like Yo, indocumentada (2011), which follow transgender women seeking legal recognition and portray violence and exclusion as central issues. Garcia Leon argues that recent Venezuelan cinema moves between exposing the social pressures faced by transgender people and documenting their efforts to gain rights and recognition.

Garcia Leon additionally covers how Colombian films approach transgender representation by focusing on everyday life rather than spectacle. He highlights Ana Cristina Monroy’s documentary Esta pueblo necesita un muerto (2008), which uses interviews and close-up shots to portray the life of a Black transgender woman in the Choco Department. According to Garcia Leon, the film addresses themes such as violence, mourning, and social abandonment, but does so in a way that gives the protagonist dignity and presence, instead of treating her as a sensational figure. He argues that this film and similar Colombian films offer a more grounded and community-centered representation of transgender lives, emphasizing personal experience and local realities.

== Live-action television ==
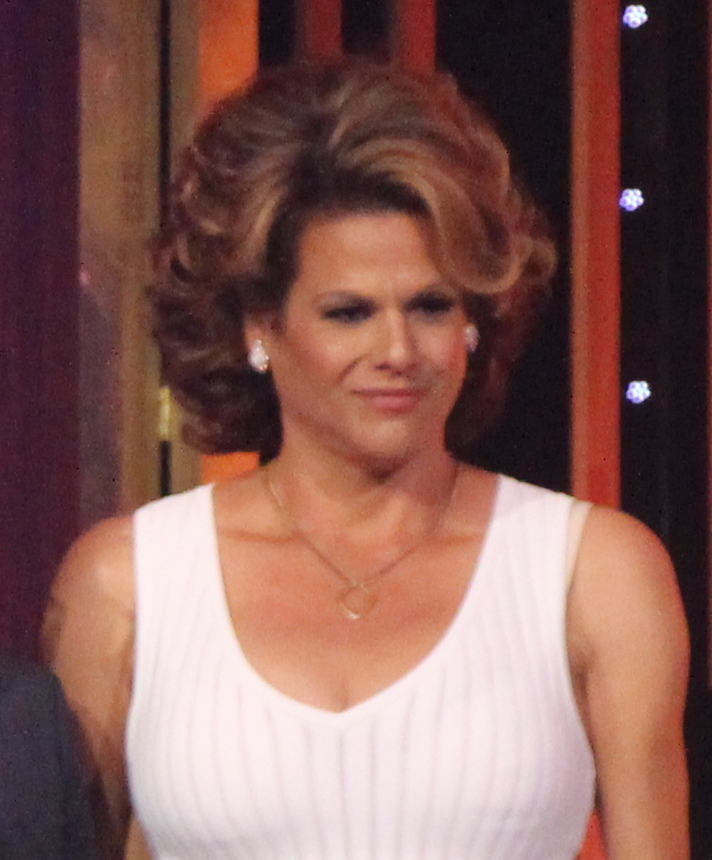
Alexandra Billings in Georgia with other cast and crew of "Transparent" in May 2016. Billings plays Davina, a trans woman who is HIV-positive in the show

In 2012, GLAAD reviewed 102 episodes and storylines of scripted television containing transgender characters, finding that "54% of those were categorized as containing negative representations at the time of their airing" while another 35% ranged from "problematic" to good", with only 12% considered "groundbreaking, fair and accurate" to such an extent that they could win a GLAAD Media Award. The organization specifically criticized CSI (2000–2015), Nip/Tuck (2003–2010), Californication (2007–2014), House of Lies (2012–2016), while praising episodes in shows such as Grey's Anatomy (2005–Present), Cold Case (2003–2010), Two and a Half Men (2003–2015), The Education of Max Bickford (2001–2002), Degrassi (2001–2015), The Riches (2007–2008), and Ugly Betty (2006–2010). The following year, GLAAD stated that while depiction of gay, lesbian, and bisexual characters increased since 2003, depictions of "transgender characters remain comparatively infrequent" and are often problematic. Degrassi continued be praised by GLAAD and by Bustle for its positive depiction of transgender characters.

In 2019, Michael Rothman of Good Morning America wrote that while Hollywood has work to do when it comes to representation, that "some major TV shows have seamlessly introduced transgender characters" which has made a big impact, as the characters "weren't defined by their gender or sexual orientation at all". In 2020, Business Insider noted that "more TV shows are featuring transgender actors and characters", ending previous trends of transgender characters played by cisgender actors like Jared Leto, Jeffrey Tambor, and Eddie Redmayne, with TV series at the forefront of bringing visibility to the transgender community. The article noted this is specifically the case with Laverne Cox starring in Orange Is the New Black (2013–2019), various actors in Pose (MJ Rodriguez, Dominique Jackson, and Indya Moore), Hunter Schafer as Jules Vaughn in Euphoria (2019–2026), Tom Phelan in The Fosters (2013–2018), Elliot Fletcher in Shameless (2011–Present) and Josie Totah in Champions (2018), adding that all these actors are "changing the landscape of television". GLAAD, Bustle, and Good Morning America all concurred with the assessment by Business Insider, praising Laverne Cox's character in Orange Is the New Black.

GLAAD and Good Morning America noted transgender characters and themes in Supergirl (2015–Present), The OA (2016–2019), RuPaul's Drag Race (2009–Present), Tales of the City (1993), TransGeneration (2005), Ugly Betty (2006–2010), Dirty Sexy Money (2007–2010), America's Next Top Model (2008), The Real World (2009), Dancing with the Stars (2011), and Glee (2012–2013). Bustle added this, noting the same was the case for the series Transparent (2014–2019), Inside Amy Schumer (2013–2016), and Bad Education (2012–2014).

In 2024, the popular Korean Netflix show Squid Game aired a second season featuring a prominent transfeminine character named Cho Hyun-ju, joining the games to pay for her gender affirming surgery. While the casting of the character going towards a cisgender man caused controversy, the limitations of the Korean actor pool made Park Sung-hoon the next best choice. As such a widely watched show with over 68 million views in the first four days, Hyun-ju brought the character to a worldwide audience, helping to humanize and normalize queer identities and struggles that may not be known to most people.

In December 2022, Professor Michelle H. S. Ho from the National University of Singapore wrote an article published in Television & New Media discussing the changing ways in which "'transgender'...tarento [or]...television personalities" are represented in "Japanese Media Culture". Ho detailed how the "historical context...of trans women in Japan" is connected to the personas of the "onē (queen) and nyūhāfu (new-half)", which are of "come[d]ic...[or] sexual" natures. Ho then spotlighted Nishihara Satsuki an "internet celebrity-turned-tarento...who identifies as toransujendā (transgender) and" is considered to be a more modern representation "...of trans tarento as entertainers" overall. Though Ho acknowledged that Satsuki "...subscribes to 'transnormativity,'" which relies "'upon a binary medical model[,]'" she ultimately emphasized how "...Satsuki demand[ed] mainstream media...take trans representation more seriously" as a whole.

In November 2026, an annual report published by GLAAD found a 79% decrease in trans characters on television since the previous year's study.

== Animated series ==
In January 2011, Wandering Son, directed by Ei Aoki and composed by Mari Okada, began airing on Fuji TV's Noitamina programming block. The series was praised for educating viewers on gender identity and gender dysphoria as many of the main characters are transgender, including Shuichi Nitori and Yoshino Takatsuki.

In June 2019, Sage Anderson wrote that when it comes to animation, it "feels like an uphill battle to find stories that reflect any positive sense of the trans experience," further saying it is rare that trans characters get "their animated time to shine." He pointed out fifteen characters which are not canon transgender, but fans have felt they connect with the most. Some of them, like Bow in She-Ra and the Princesses of Power, who is confirmed as not heterosexual, but series creator ND Stevenson said he is "very fond of" the fan interpretation that Bow is transgender.

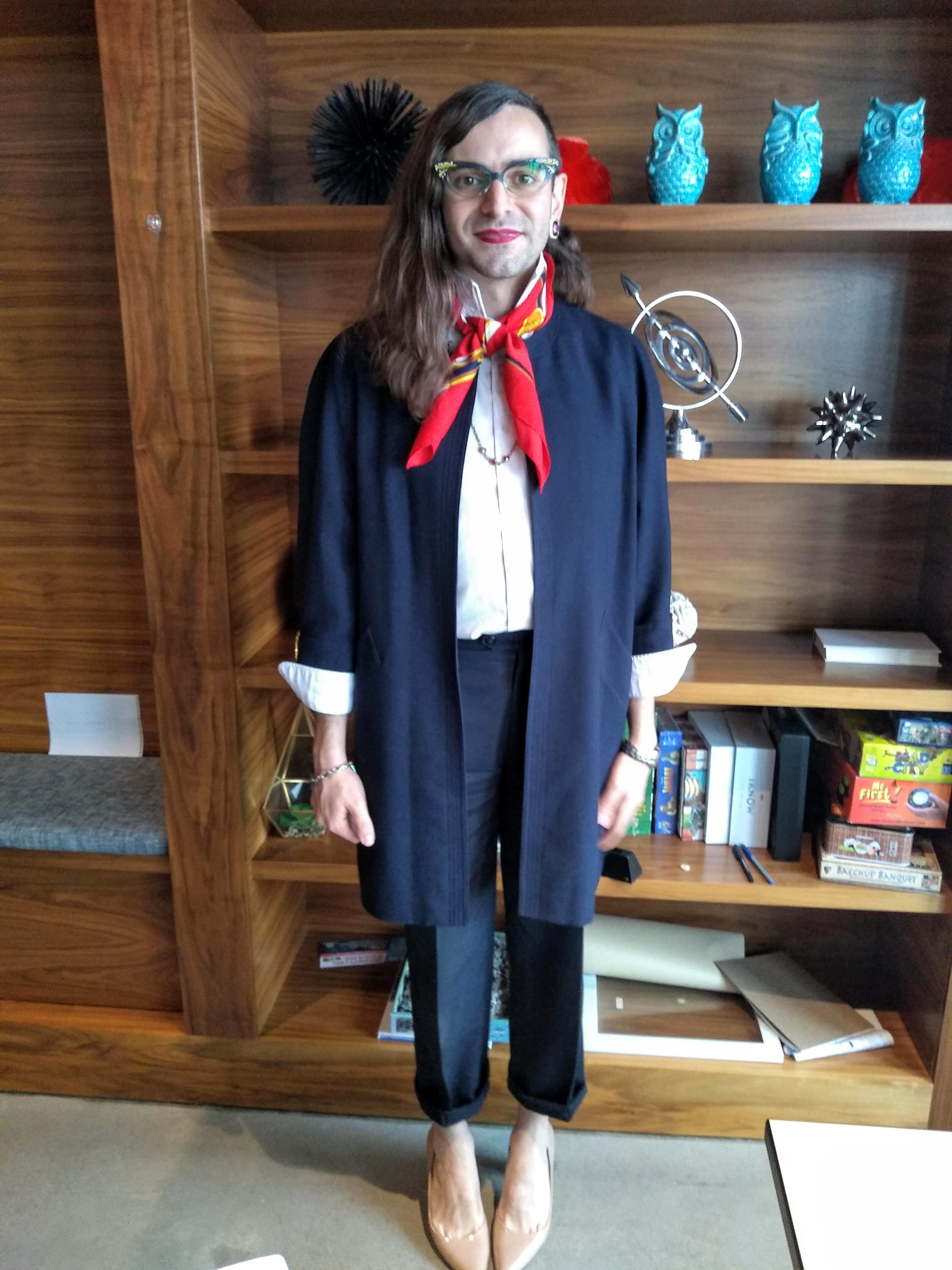
American writer and transgender activist Jacob Tobia at Microsoft New England Research and Development Center in 2019, speaking about diversity and their book Sissy.

In November 2019, the Los Angeles Times interviewed Jacob Tobia, who voiced a shapeshifting mercenary named Double Trouble in She-Ra and the Princesses of Power, noting that this follows on the heels of shows like Danger & Eggs, co-created by a trans woman, Shadi Petosky, which included a non-binary character named Milo, voiced by Tyler Ford, a non-binary advocate and actor. Tobia told the publication that transgender and queer people have been working in animation for a long time, especially influencing all-ages animation, and called their role voicing Double Trouble as an extension of that work, the "next step in a much longer journey".

In 2020, The Guardian highlighted five cartoons with the best transgender characters. This included She-Ra and the Princesses of Power with Double Trouble, a trans man named Jewelstar (voiced by Alex Blue Davis), themes in Steven Universe with Steven trying to get his chosen family to "use the right name and generally to respect him for who he is", and Nico Colaleo's Too Loud with a boy named Jeffrey coming out as Desirée. Other shows mentioned included Rocko's Modern Life: Static Cling where Rachel comes out as transgender and Danger & Eggs, which is described as wonderfully "showing transgender characters, as well as LGBTQ characters in general", including a trans girl named Zadie voiced by Jazz Jennings and a non-binary character named Milo.

In late 2020, the publication, Samantha Allen wrote in them. they had wanted transgender characters who are "neither punching bags nor possibility models" and that they found such a character in Natalie, voiced by Josie Totah, in the show Big Mouth. Totah called this exciting because it could reach an audience that wouldn't be able to "this representation if it was on a different show" and called it "super cool".

In January 2021, RWBY, an anime-influenced series on Rooster Teeth, confirmed May Marigold, voiced by Kdin Jenzen, as transgender on scene. Jenzen told Comic Book Resources that this was a "moment of triumph", was glad she got support from fans, and praised the show for finding the way to make May's moment not "focus solely on her being her, but about everything happening in the now", with her story relevant to the story's protagonists, moving the plot ahead, and motivating those near her.

In May 2021, the online YouTube series Helluva Boss, created by Vivienne Medrano, introduced the family of one of the main characters, Millie. One of her siblings is a confirmed transgender imp named Sallie May. She is also voiced by transgender actress Morgana Ignis. She was confirmed to be transgender by her voice actress, Morgana Ignis and a lesbian in merchandise, with Ingis as a transgender lesbian herself.

In a posting about the fandom for the Knights of Guinevere pilot, which released in September 2025, E.B. Hutchins said that Frankie is a "very obviously queer-coded, if not outright a butch lesbian" and noted that while some gave her the headcanon of being transgender, series co-created Dana Terrace clarified that the character was cisgender and used "masculine nicknames" and that she was fine with headcanons for the character, after some trans fans criticized her remarks. Hutchins went onto say that marginalized creators are under a burden to make representation "good", but discouraged those creators from writing about people who "exist under different identities than them", that in the past headcanons kept fandoms going and led to queer representation like with Bubbline (Princess Bubblegum and Marceline the Vampire Queen) and Korrasami (Korra and Asami Sato), and said that storytellers can be inspirational but are not "saviors". In a related posting, Jade King cautioned fans of the pilot to not accuse Terrace of transphobia, saying it is too early to make conclusions about the story, and that it was possible that a "queer character and/or storyline" would be introduced later, suggesting that people should be celebrating an "incredibly diverse" cast instead.

== Theatre ==
When it comes to theater, it is a mixed bag for trans people. Trans performers have been struggling to break into the musical theater genre despite the fact that theater has "been such a crucial place for the exploration of gender fluidity", and continuing questions over whether cisgender people should play trans characters or not. Hedwig in Hedwig and the Angry Inch is a trans woman, played by both men and women on the stage. La Cienega in Bring It On: The Musical is a transgender teen character. Individual productions alter the identity of characters, such as Angel in Rent who is a drag queen in some productions and a trans woman in others. Adam is a play based on the true story of trans man Adam Kashmiry and his journey from Egypt to Scotland.

In 2017, The Washington Post noted that Taylor Mac, producer of the play, "Hir" (pronounced here), insisted that the protagonist should "be someone who was a biological female and now identifies as transgender or gender-queer". In 2018, K. Woodzick, a genderqueer writer, stated that in theater, if a role is not specifically designated as transgender or non-binary, it is considered cisgender "by default", which is why they started the Non-Binary Monologues Project in 2017, with most of the monologues "written by queer, trans or nonbinary people", connecting their personal experience with their stories.

Other theatre artists creating transgender representation include performance artist Kate Bornstein, director Will Davis, and playwright Ty Defoe, all profiled in 50 Key Figures in Queer US Theatre (2022). Transgender characters also appear in plays by MJ Kaufman, Mashuq Mushtaq Deen, j. chavez, Raphael Amahl Khouri, Sharifa Yasmin, Leanna Keyes, and Azure D. Osborne-Lee, all published in The Methuen Drama Book of Trans Plays (2021).

== Video games ==
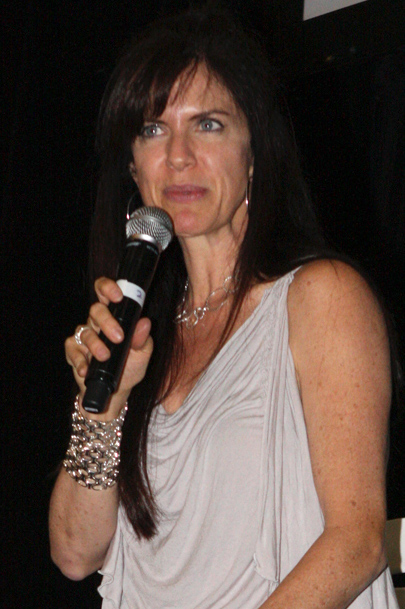
Jennifer Hale in 2012; Hale voiced Krem in the game Dragon Age: Inquisition

Charlize Veritas wrote that for transgender the ability to express yourself "in a new and wonderful world is such a gift", which includes playing as your preferred gender in video games. Early examples of transgender characters include Birdo in Super Mario Bros. 2, where the manual asserts that Birdo is a boy who "thinks he is a girl", and Poison in Final Fight, who was censored in the English localization. Due to adherence to Nintendo of America's quality standards and translations based on preserving gameplay rather than literal meaning, these characters' identities were altered or erased in translation. Birdo has been recognized by Out and The Advocate for being trans-friendly and the "video gaming world's first transgender character". Poison in the game Final Fight (1989), a trans female villain, who later appeared in Street Fighter, was also noted as one of the first trans characters, even though her creators were criticized for being condescending about her because she is trans.

Some reviewers pointed to other 1990s and 2000s games with transgender characters. This included Flea in Chrono Trigger (1995) who made clear that "gender identity is a fungible thing" and has been described as genderfluid, Quina Quen in Final Fantasy IX (2000), Bridget in Guilty Gear (1998–2017), Guillo in Baten Kaitos: Eternal Wings and the Lost Ocean (2003), Leo Kliesen in Tekken 6 (2009). However, Kleisen's appearance is "deeply androgynous" and debates continue about the sexual identity of the character. There have been indie games which have addressed the transgender community, including Hardcoded (2019) and other titles. However, one indie game, Heartbeat (2018) was criticized after it appeared to mock suicide of transgender people and the series creator made a number of transphobic tweets, leading some of those who worked on the game to distance themselves from it.

In November 2014, an action role-playing video game, Dragon Age: Inquisition was released. The game introduced a transgender character named Cremisius "Krem" Aclassi who was born female, but presents as a man. A writer for Dragon Age: Inquisition, Trick Weekes, explained that the idea for Krem was formed a few years earlier, with one of the requests from fans that BioWare, which produced the series, to create transgender and genderqueer characters. After that point, Weekes and other employees discussed how to do this, with the character having to "belong and serve a purpose in the game", rather than just ticking off a box, and they decided that Krem fit well into the role as a lieutenant of the Iron Bull. Weekes further explained that Krem's status as a trans man "could emphasize Bull's character by opening up discussions of Qunari gender roles", with the character specially defined and drafts of the character passed to his friends in the genderqueer community to get their feedback. He said that BioWare is looking for feedback to do better with characters in other games. Some commentators called Krem one of the best trans characters in video games and praised him as a positive transmasculine character. Kirk Hamilton from Kotaku hoped that more studios follow the example of the game and have similar characters in their games. Another reviewer pointed out that 2017 game Dream Daddy: A Dad Dating Simulator fulfilled the "unfortunate gaps" of Dragon Age: Inquisition, but that this representation was still limited.

In September 2015, Destiny: The Taken King, a major expansion for Bungie's first-person shooter Destiny was released. The titular character in this game, Oryx, is a trans man. Polygon asked why gaming publications had not discussed this, noting that on paper this is "a huge moment for advancing transgender representation within our medium" but that this is not acknowledged within the game, only hidden away on the show's website. As such, they argued that while this is positive, it can't be praised because the fact Oryx is transgender is hidden away.

In September 2017, South Park: The Fractured but Whole was released, a game lets players pick "female, transgender, or cisgender characters". The same year, Hainly Abrams appeared in Mass Effect: Andromeda and became the first trans character of the Mass Effect franchise. In December 2017, a trailer for Catherine, which would premiere in February 2019, was released by the game's developer. Upon seeing the trailer, some trans gamers were concerned that the game would "include a transphobic character", noting that on the game's website, the character, Rin, is "implied to be transgender". In 2018, The Advocate noted that a waitress named Erica is revealed to be transgender in one ending of the game.

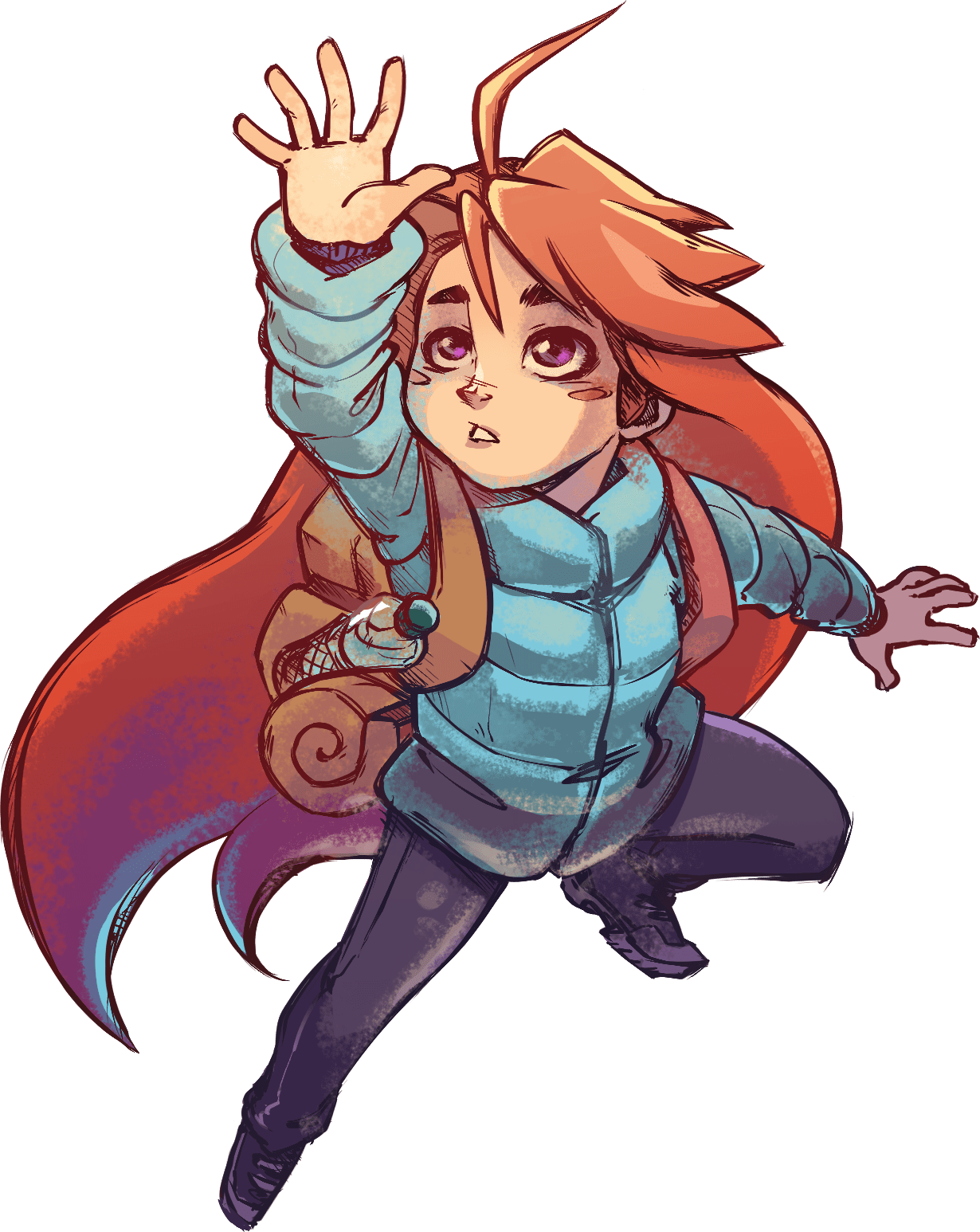
Madeline, the main character of Celeste, is a transgender girl.

In September 2019, a free DLC chapter of the platforming video game Celeste was released, acting as an epilogue to the main story and adds 100 new screens. Some fans speculated that the protagonist Madeline is transgender because she has a pride and transgender flag near her computer monitor, while on her nightstand is a photograph with a woman where she has "notably shorter hair" and a some believed that a prescription pill bottle shown nearby is "medication for the anxiety and depression" or is medication for hormone replacement therapy.

However, some of saying this just represents her allyship or argue that the fact that developers have not confirmed this relegates it to queerbaiting. Furthermore, this reveal caused discussion and debate, with the wiki for the game taking a "firm stance against Madeline being a trans character", and the creator remained silent on the issue, leading many to "refuse to accept it as canon".

Laura Dale of SYFY added that while there is "room for characters who are never explicitly stated as trans", Celeste never hints at Madeline being trans, only "dropping a flag at the end of the game with no other context" and that this could have happened because developers want to walk a line between those who want better representation and "bigots who might play their game". Dale concluded that when the trans status of a character is ambiguous it means that "trans fans can't fully get excited about representation", and that she wishes that the creative team for the game talks about it in some capacity.

On November 5, 2020, the game's creator, Maddy Thorson, came out as trans and confirmed that Madeline is trans, adding that it is "painfully obvious", calling the creation of Celeste realizing the truth about herself. (Note: Dale, who had been critical of the representation originally, responded to Thorson's post, calling it a "real interesting read" which "answers a lot of questions I had at the time about the way her trans status was lightly hinted" and called trans representation "tricky.") Thorson also said that she doesn't blame anyone for criticizing how Madeline's transness was represented, but that she needed time before talking openly about it, talked about the value of trans representation, argued that "Madeline's transness is meaningfully intertwined with her story", and added that she worked with transgender people to add in small details to her room, while admitting that she would write the story differently now, calling the game one "written and designed by a closeted trans person".

In September 2019, Borderlands 3, an action role-playing first-person shooter video game was first released. The game has non-binary, gay, pansexual, and straight characters, which Danny Homan, senior writer at the game's developer, Gearbox Software, said that since their goal is "entertain the world", their characters should reflect that world, with writers trying to be aware and respectful of people of all backgrounds. In the game specifically, FL4K is "nonbinary, omnisexual and omniflirtatious", Zane Flynt is pansexual man, and Lorelei is non-binary and transgender, as noted by the Washington Post.

In June 2020, action-adventure game titled The Last of Us Part II was released. Paste argued that while the game tries to tell a story "inclusive of trans identities" with characters like Lev, a trans man, he "is continuously placed into varying degrees of violence" during the game as he tries to stand up during the game, and concluded that his story isn't made for trans people but to "give cisgender players a space to connect with their guilt and pity for trans people". Even so, the magazine praised Ian Alexander, a trans actor, for voicing the character, and praised the character generally, even as they called the game a "reproduction of violence on the trans individual".

Between August and September 2020, the video game Tell Me Why was released in three episodes for Microsoft Windows and Xbox One. It would be praised for having a major playable transgender character, Tyler, which is voiced by a trans man named August Black, with the game developed with input from GLAAD. Many reviewers would say that the game "made history", "stands out", is a milestone for LGBTQ representation, for featuring Tyler as a transgender character. Black told Axios that he is honored to voice the character, saying the character has taught him a lot, adding that "in a way I feel like I also showed him a thing or two" and that backlash from the game doesn't scare him, arguing that "people should get used to trans representation.

In December 2020, Cyberpunk 2077, an action role-playing game was released. It faced backlash for its stereotypes of transgender people, with some people even boycotting the game altogether. One critic said that no matter how much trans people tell cisgender people about the problems with the game, concerns of trans people "never outweigh cis pleasures". George Borsari of Screen Rant wrote that the game's portrayal of trans people is problematic, with pronouns of a character tied to their voice pitch, no ability to choose non-binary pronouns, and "a lack of trans story characters". Bosari pointed out there also issues in the advertising for the game before its release and noted that in the past CD Projekt has interacted with the trans community in a problematic manner.

The Sims 4 added cosmetics aimed towards the transgender community in a 2023 update. Those items include top surgery scars, binders, and shapewear.

== Music ==
There are various transgender musicians who have made their mark on the music industry. This includes Shea Diamond, KC Ortiz, Star Amerasu, Anohni, and She King (who takes the stage name of Shawnee Talbot). Furthermore, Skylar Kergil, The Cliks (especially a trans male singer named Lucas Silveira), Ryan Cassata, Kim Petras, Rae Spoon, and Katastrophe have also been recognized as accomplished musicians. The same was said to be the case for Black Cracker and Audrey Zee Whitesides.

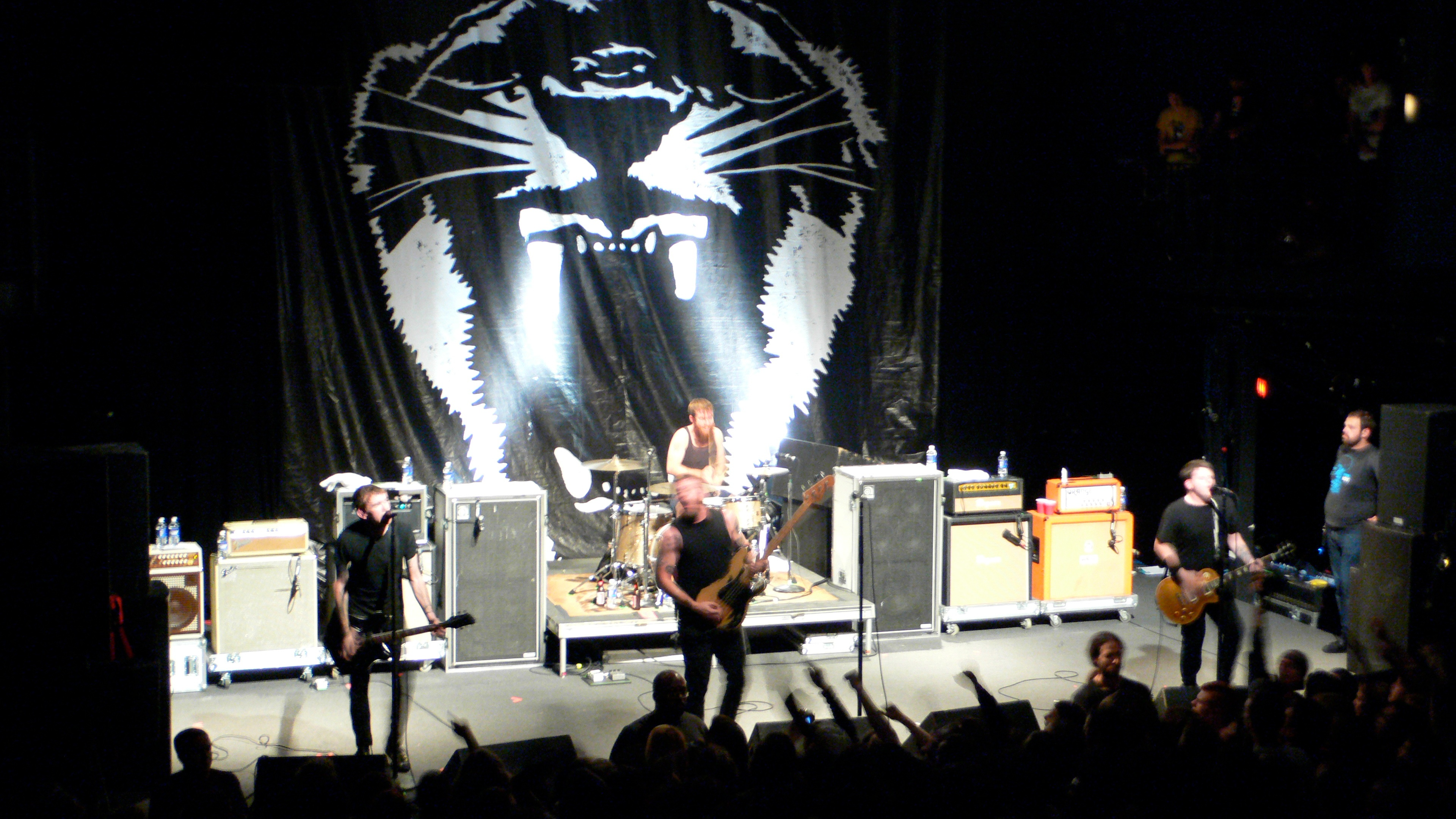
Against Me! on tour in support of New Wave

In 2016, the singer and guitarist of Against Me!, an American punk rock band, Laura Jane Grace burned her birth certificate on stage to protest discrimination against transgender people in North Carolina. The band's album Transgender Dysphoria Blues deals with gender dysphoria, following Grace's gender transition and coming out. Grace, part of one of the most "premier punk groups" had come out as transgender in 2012 and was praised for honestly approaching trans issues in Transgender Dysphoria Blues.

In 2020, Teddy Geiger, a transgender musician lauded for changing the music industry, gave an interview to NBC News. She said that she found she was transgender when she tried to get treatment for her obsessive–compulsive disorder and publicly stated on Instagram she was trans in October 2017, getting positive support from her family.

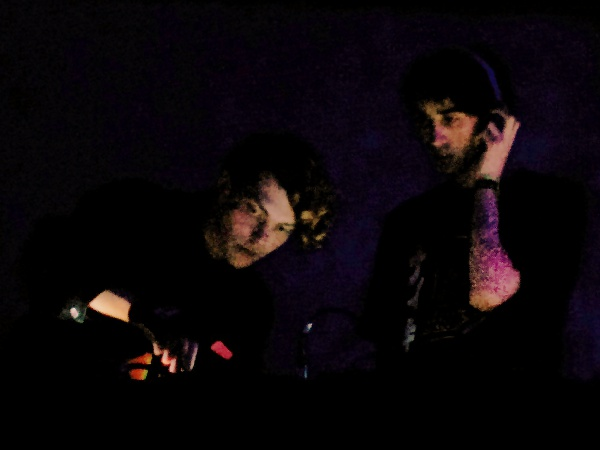
Sophie (left) produced "Hey QT" with A. G. Cook (right).

In January 2021, pioneering trans performer, Sophie, died unexpectedly. Jessica Dunn Rovinelli of The Guardian stated that Sophie's electronic dance tracks "freed femininity and bodies from their usual contexts and let them dance with abandon", including albums like Bipp in 2013. She further called the music "intensely physical" and noted that Sophie's single, Lemonade, established a sound which "influenced virtually every aspect of mainstream pop music since", and praised the single It's OK to Cry as "revelatory", and dissolving fake and real hierarchies. She further said that the album, Oil of Every Pearl's Un-Insides is "more far-reaching" than her other albums. Other publications said that Sophie pushed the boundaries of pop music, was the "architect of future pop", and was an "experimental pop producer".

In February 2021, the BBC Archive Twitter account shared a clip of Wendy Carlos, in 1970, showing how to use the Moog synthesizer, who had disguised herself as a cisgender man as she was fearful, at the time, "of being publicly seen as a woman". Carlos came out publicly as trans in 1979. Carlos was a "classical composer and instrumentalist" who came to fame with her 1968 album, Switched-On Bach while also composing music for A Clockwork Orange, The Shining, and other films.

== See also ==
- Redefining Realness – 2014 memoir by Janet Mock
- Whipping Girl – 2007 book on transgender issues by Julia Serano
- LGBTQ stereotypes – Stereotypes around LGBTQ people and communities
- Media portrayals of bisexuality
- Media portrayal of lesbians
- Media portrayal of asexuality
- Media portrayal of pansexuality
- Media portrayal of LGBTQ people
- LGBTQ themes in Western animation
- LGBTQ themes in anime and manga
- Transgender representation in the Drag Race franchise
