= Sagittarius Ponderosa =

Transgender play

- Original language: English
- Written by: MJ Kaufman
- Characters: Archer, Mom, Pops, Owen, Grandma, Peterson (puppet)
- Subject: Transgender life

Premiere
- Place: San Francisco

Sagittarius Ponderosa is a 2016 play by American writer MJ Kaufman. It tells the story of Archer, who is transgender and returns home to help care for his father. The production was noted for its use of "aroma-turgy" where scent is part of the staging. It has been performed at the New Conservatory Theatre Center in San Francisco, by the National Asian American Theater Company in New York and at Austin Rainbow Theatre in Texas. It is one of eight plays to be featured in the 2021 volume The Methuen Drama Book of Trans Plays. The work has been compared to The Trees by Agnes Borinsky and How to Live in a House on Fire by Kari Barclay.

== Plot ==
Archer (referred to as Angela by his family) is transgender, and returns home to his family (Mom, Pops and Grandma) due to his father's illness. For respite from family dynamics, Archer visits a local pine tree and meets a forestry student (Owen) with whom he has an affair. As the family come to terms with Pops' terminal illness and his death, he returns as a ghost.

== Productions ==
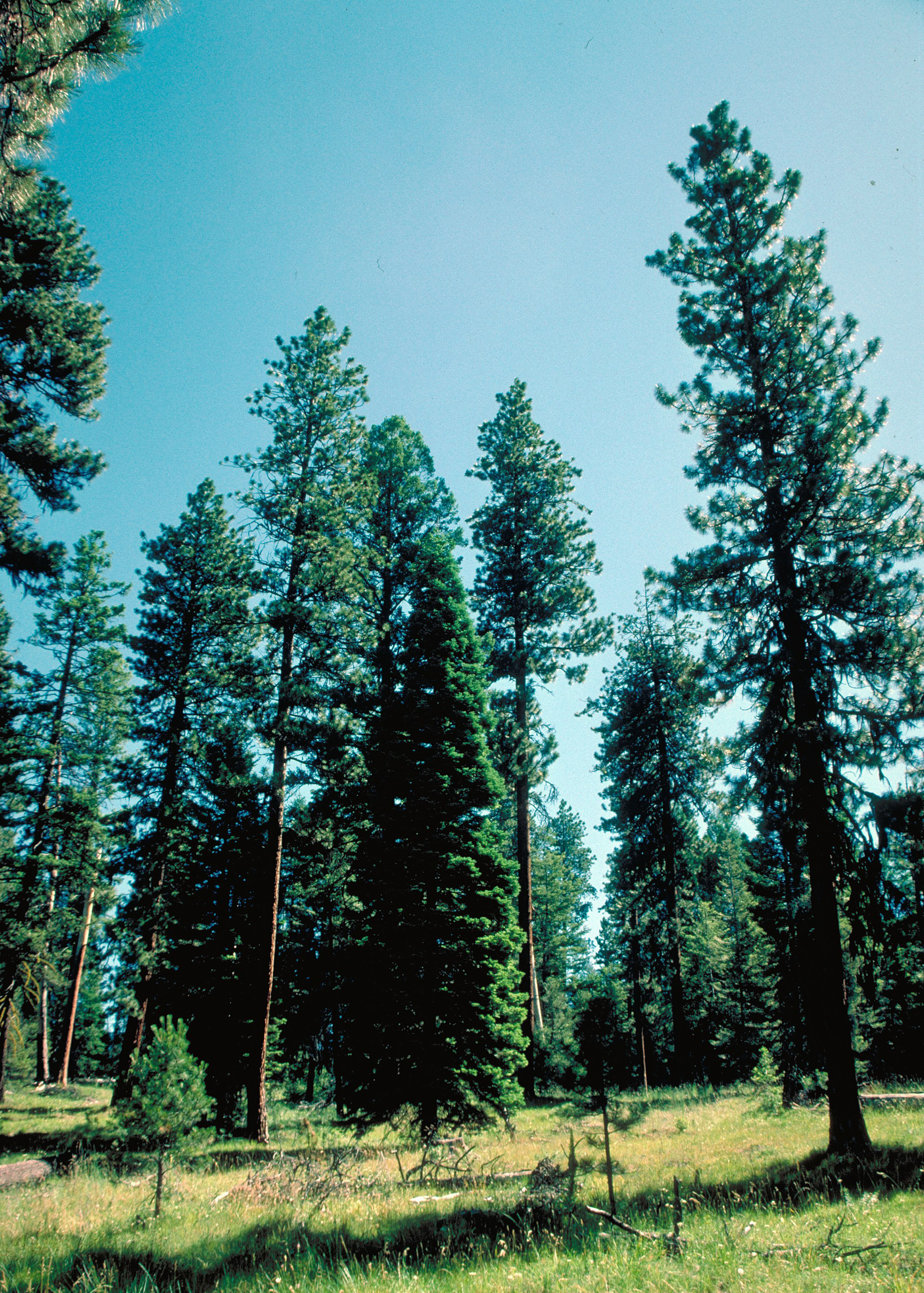
Ponderosa pines in Oregon

The play was staged at the New Conservatory Theatre Center in San Francisco in February 2016. The production was noted for its use of "aroma-turgy" where scent is part of the staging; here oil-infused melted wax was used to share the scent of the Ponderosa pine with the audience. It later premiered in November 2016 off-broadway with National Asian American Theater Company, using traverse staging, directed by Ken Rus Schmoll. The pine tree in this production was described by the New York Times as "enormous, ethereal, majestic—and translucent white, as if it had been pieced together from ghosts".

The work had its Chicago premier at the Redtwist Theatre in 2018. The staging was described as creating a "liminal space where the future and past as well as the living and the dead can mingle freely". In 2023 the company Obvious Dad staged the play in Chattanooga.

== Reception ==
The San Francisco Examiner reviewed the February 2016 production, praised the dialogue and the performance of Archer by SK Kerestas, but felt that the storylines focussed on gender required the audience to know about them in advance. It described the show ultimately as "an occasionally engaging but lumpily unsatisfying pudding". The November 2016 production was reviewed by the New York Times and described as "flat"; this is attributed by the reviewer to the alley-style staging, which meant that the faces of the performers were difficult to see at key moments. The portrayal of Mom by Mia Katigbak was praised by the reviewer, who also praised the set by Kimie Nishikawa and the sound design. The New Yorker reviewed the acting as "assiduous and sometimes affecting" but felt that the direction was too under-stated for a play characterised by its reserve.

== Analysis ==
Sagittarius Ponderosa is one of eight plays to be featured in the 2021 volume The Methuen Drama Book of Trans Plays. In their critical introduction to the play in the volume Jesse D. O'Rear describes how the core theme of the play is that of transition, related to gender, family, the environment and time. The other works are in the volume are: The Betterment Society by Mashuq Mushtaq Deen; how to clean your room by j. chavez; She He Me by Raphael Khouri; The Devils Between Us by Sharifa Yasmin; Firebird Tattoo by Ty Defoe; Crooked Parts by Azure Osborne-Lee. Kaufman, Mushtaq Deen and chavez's works are grouped together due to their use of puppetry. The work has been compared to The Trees by Agnes Borinsky and How to Live in a House on Fire by Kari Barclay. The three works examine the impact of (wild)fire through queer perspectives. The work has also been part of studies that analyse multi-sensory performance, focussed on smell.
