= National Asian American Theater Company =

American non-profit

- Established: 1989; 37 years ago
- Founder: Mia Katigbak; Richard Eng
- Headquarters: New York City, US
- Coordinates: 40°45′13″N 73°59′31″W
- Website: naatco.org

The National Asian American Theater Company (NAATCO) is a non-profit theater company based in New York City. Founded by Mia Katigbak and Richard Eng, the company produces and performs classics of Western theatre, often with color-blind casting. Alongside the Pan Asian Repertory Theatre and Ma-Yi Theater Company, the three organisations founded the National Asian American Theater Festival.

== History ==
Founded in 1989 in New York City by Mia Katigbak and Richard Eng, the National Asian American Theater Company (NAATCO) aimed to produce and perform classics of western theater with all Asian American casts. Works by Shakespeare, Moliere and Chekhov were targeted and the aim was to provide experience in major roles for the casts - many Asian American actors had reported that access to these kinds of parts was a major career barrier.

NAATCO was one of three Asian American theatre companies that conceived of and produced the first National Asian American Theater Festival, which was first held in 2007. The other two co-founding organisations were Pan Asian Repertory Theatre and Ma-Yi Theater Company; the three organisations had first begun work on the festival in 2003. As part of the inaugural festival NAATCO re-staged Falsettoland by Alan Muraoka, which had been a popular production for the company in 1998.

In 2020 NAATCO began a series of regional partnerships, with the aim of staging classic American or western plays with all Asian American casts, or adapting works by Asian American playwrights.

== Selected productions ==
NAATCO staged Our Town by Thornton Wilder in 1994. The production was praised for its casting by The Record, particularly the depiction of the character Emily by Yumi Iwama which added nothing "but beauty to this great and beautiful play". In 1995 NAATCO staged The School for Wives by Moliere, where Arloa Reston and Daniel Dae-Kim were praised for their performances as Agnes and Horace respectively. The same year the company staged A Midsummer Night's Dream. The 1998 production of Falsettoland was praised for its colorblind casting.

Othello was staged by the company in 2000: in it Tess Lina was praised for her role as Emilia and the New York Times commented "how clear the plot is and how swift its development if all the baggage of race we tend to bring to it is simply left at the door". In 2004 NAATCO staged a production of Antigone where Mia Katigbak played the ruler Creon.

The 2015 production of Charles Francis Chan Jr.'s Exotic Murder Mystery was praised for its use of enlarged images of performers in both whiteface and yellowface. The same year the company staged Awake and Sing! by Clifford Odets, where Asian American actors played a Jewish American family in the 1930s. The company premiered the play Sagittarius Ponderosa by MJ Kaufman off-broadway in 2016, which used traverse staging and was directed by Ken Rus Schmoll. In 2018, NAATCO staged Shakespeare's Henry VI, Part 1, Henry VI, Part 2 and Henry VI, Part 3. Condensed into two three-hour plays by Stephen Brown-Fried, the play was reviewed by the New York Times as "fast-paced and gripping" with "an unusually lucid staging".

In 2022 NAATCO collaborated with Public Theater to commission and produce a series of monologues by Asian American writers that were specifically written for Asian American performers over the age of 60. The following year NAATCO co-produced Public Obscenities by Shayok Misha Chowdhury - a play based around a documentary into queer dating in India.

== Legacy ==
The National Asian American Theatre Company has been praised for its colorblind casting, one example being its "photo-negative" casting for their production of Othello in 2000. This approach, in particular to the company's portrayal of Jewish drama, has been described as a strategy that "attests to the premise that talented and well-trained actors can play a plethora of roles that may or may not correspond with their appearance". This has drawn comparison with Group Theatre's productions.

Speaking on the company's 25th anniversary, Mia Katigbak described the company's achievements in the following way:

It's a milestone, just for the shear fact that we've survived that long. I believe we have the fortunate reputation of doing good work, no matter what we do, and that's a good thing.
