= Southern Comfort Conference =

Annual transgender conference

- Status: Defunct
- Genre: Transgender community
- Frequency: Annual
- Location: Fort Lauderdale, Florida
- Country: United States
- Inaugurated: 1991
- Most recent: 2019

The Southern Comfort Conference was a major transgender conference that took place annually from 1991 to 2019. It featured seminars, events, and speeches by prominent people in the LGBT community, numerous vendors catering to transgender and transsexual people, and more. The event became famous and was known as the largest transgender conference in the United States. The event brought together transgender people, researchers, educators, therapists, doctors, and LGBT organizations and offers scholarships to some attendees.

The conference provided the title for and is featured heavily in the 2001 documentary Southern Comfort, about the life and death of Robert Eads, whose goal in 1998 was to live long enough to attend the conference. Eads succeeded, and his speech at the conference is featured in the documentary. In honor of the memory of Eads, the conference offered health exams through the annual "Robert Eads Health Project" in collaboration with the Trans Health Initiative at the Feminist Women's Health Center.

The conference built a reputation as a safe place for LGBT people with a familial atmosphere, and aims at inclusiveness. It attracted people from all over the United States, offering the opportunity for social and other interaction. From the conference's founding in 1991 until 2014, the conference was held in Atlanta, Georgia. At the conclusion of the 2014 Southern Comfort Conference, the board of directors announced that SCC 2015-2017 would be held in Fort Lauderdale, Florida.

With support from the Greater Fort Lauderdale Convention and Visitor Bureau, the 2017 conference was to be held from September 14–17 at The Riverside Hotel in Fort Lauderdale However it was cancelled because of Hurricane Irma. The 2018 and 2019 conferences returned to the Riverside. The conference was cancelled in 2020 and 2021 due to COVID-19 concerns. Following a nationwide wave of anti-trans legislation in 2021, efforts to organize a conference at the previous scale were unsuccessful.
