= Agnes Borinsky =

American writer

- Occupations: Playwright, novelist
- Writing career
- Period: 2017–present
- Notable work: Sasha Masha
- Notable awards: Lambda Literary Award (nominee)

Agnes Borinsky is an American playwright and author, who wrote the young adult novel Sasha Masha, a coming-of-age story about a queer Jewish American girl, nominated for a Lambda Award in 2021. She wrote and performed in A Song of Songs in 2022, which retold through a queer lens the biblical book Song of Songs. In 2023, her play The Trees premiered at Playwrights Horizons' theatre; the work imagines the lives of siblings whose bodies root into the earth in a Connecticut park. This work was compared to Waiting for Godot, Sagittarius Ponderosa and How to Live in a House on Fire.

== Life ==
Borinsky comes from Baltimore and her mother is from Boston. She lived for some years in New York before she moved to Los Angeles. In 2012, she joined Donna Oblongata, who was directing a play based on Les Misérables. The unconventional play was said to be unlicensed, although the original book of Les Misérables is out of copyright. The play was performed for a week on the east coast of America after the fifty-plus cast had rehearsed the work under a circus tent. In 2016, she became an artist-in-residence at the University Settlement, where Alison Fleminger encouraged her to abandon the restrictions of writing a conventional play. As a result, Borinsky led over twenty collaborators to create a participatory show called "Weird Classrooms". Her next project was a working group based in Brooklyn at the Bushwick Starr theatre.

== Writings ==
An early experimental theatre piece, Of Government, was commissioned in 2015 and performed in 2017. It was reviewed by the New York Times as having a "globe-crossing plot that is as twisty and slippery as ... an eel", with an opening musical number reminiscent of The Little Mermaid. Borinsky's first novel was published in 2020. Sasha Masha is a coming-of-age story about a queer Jewish American girl, but, according to Kirkus Reviews, unlike other books of the genre "doesn't arrive at a clear resolution possessing all the answers, instead displaying a sense of peace with the ongoing journey ahead". The same year Borinsky established The Working Group for a New Spirit, which brought together creative practitioners online during the COVID-19 pandemic to discuss texts.

In 2022 Borinsky retold the biblical book Song of Songs through a queer perspective, which debuted at the Bushwick Starr, with the writer also in a central role, and was directed by Machel Ross. A participatory work, audience members were invited to place paper offerings on an altar, referred to by the reviewer as a "shrine to the dead". The New York Times described the work as "deeply affecting" and one that led the "audience toward a meditative consideration of their own mourning for those they have lost, to death or otherwise".

In 2023 her play The Trees premiered at Playwrights Horizons' theatre; the work imagines the lives of siblings whose bodies root into the earth in a Connecticut park. Directed by Tina Satter, the play deals with themes of mutual care, community, queer liberation and civil rights. The New York Theatre Guide criticised Borinsky's plot, but also compared the work to Waiting for Godot. In a similarly mixed review, the New York Times described how in the play "Borinsky invites guesses; the problem is that we might not care enough for any of the people or ideas onstage to bother hazarding them". The work has been compared to Sagittarius Ponderosa by MJ Kaufman and How to Live in a House on Fire by Kari Barclay. The three works examine the impact of (wild)fire through queer perspectives. Indeed, Borinsky's work has been discussed as part of a "trans theatre" movement.

== Awards ==
- 2021: Lambda Award nominee for Sasha Masha

== Personal life ==
Borinsky is Jewish American; she is also transgender. She lives in Los Angeles.

== Selected works ==
=== Novels ===
- Sasha Masha (Farrar, Straus and Giroux, 2020)

=== Plays ===
- Of Government (2017)
- A Song of Songs (2022)
- The Trees (2023)
