= The Methuen Drama Book of Trans Plays =

Anthology of transgender plays

- Editor: Leanna Keyes, Lindsey Mantoan, Angela Farr Schiller
- Language: English
- Genre: Dramaturgy
- Publisher: Methuen Drama
- Publication date: 2021
- Followed by: The Methuen Drama Book of Trans Plays Volume 2

The Methuen Drama Book of Trans Plays is an anthology of plays by transgender writers. Edited by Leanna Keyes, Lindsey Mantoan, and Angela Farr Schiller, it was published in 2021. It was followed by a second volume in 2025 and a third in 2026, the latter focussing on young adult drama. The volume was reviewed as "an intersectional and diverse collection of trans plays" that "self-reflexively advocates for the need to amplify trans voices".

== Contents ==
Published in 2021, the volume is divided into three sections, the first of which includes plays that use puppetry as a theatrical device. This section includes Sagittarius Ponderosa by MJ Kaufman, The Betterment Society by Mashuq Mushtaq Deen and How To Clean Your Room (And Remember All Your Trauma) by J. Chavez. The plays in the second section engage with themes of border crossings. It includes She He Me by Raphaël Amahl Khouri and The Devils Between Us by Sharifa Yazmeen. The third section includes plays that refer to themes of family: Doctor Voynich and Her Children by Leanna Keyes, Firebird Tattoo by Ty Defoe and Crooked Parts by Azure-Osborne-Lee. Each play has a critical introduction by scholars from the field, most of whom are also transgender.

== Reception ==
The publication of this anthology, alongside other anthologies of Black British queer plays, Russian plays and Romanian plays, was described by David Edgar, writing in 2021, as part of a "'golden age of playwriting". The book was reviewed by Bess Rowen, a theatre theorist, who described how it revealed the range and variety of "trans plays" and noted that the editors wanted the volume to enable the plays within to reach new audiences. Rowen expressed hope that the work "marks the trans tipping point in terms of theatre works by, for, and about many kinds of trans lives".

A further review of the anthology by Anthony Sansonetti praised the anthology for showing "the minutiae of transgender life and experience ... from the ordinary to the fantastic, from the mundane to the revolutionary, and from childhood to old age". The review also commented on how the volume contrasts to previous approaches to transgender theatre—which could be "demeaning" and "tragic"—and provides "in-depth explorations of the deeply material and historical relationship between trans people and their communities". The same review concluded that all the plays in the volume share an interest in temporality, whether it is Black, Indigenous time, musical, spiritual, apocalyptic, lost, traumatic, revolutionary, or nonlinear times.

In comparing the volume to others collated by Mark Gatiss, Oberon Books and Fintan Walsh, Robyn Dudić noted that (unlike those three publications) transgender dramatists wrote every play in this volume. Dudić also noted that the plays all share participatory approaches, citing The Betterment Society and He, She, Me as particularly effective examples. The review concludes by describing the volume as "an intersectional and diverse collection of trans plays" that "self-reflexively advocates for the need to amplify trans voices".

== Later volumes ==
A second volume, The Methuen Drama Book of Trans Plays Volume 2, was published in 2025 and included: Cercle Hermaphroditos by Shualee Cook, Red Rainbow by Azure D. Osborne-Lee, Degenerates by Else Went, Close to Home by Sharifa Yazmeen, The Bugs by Sloka Krishnan, The Skin of Other Men by Fig Lefevre, Oh, Buddy by Hal Cosentino and Gender Play, or what you Will co-created by Will Wilhelm and Erin Murray. The third volume, The Methuen Drama Book of Trans Plays Volume 3: Young Adult Fiction, was published in May 2026; it focuses on young adult theatre. Playwrights included in the volume include Jameson P. Murray and Joshua Bastian Cole-Kurz.

== Bibliography ==
- The Methuen Drama Book of Trans Plays, edited by Leanna Keyes, Lindsey Mantoan, and Angela Farr Schiller. London: Methuen Drama, 2021
- The Methuen Drama Book of Trans Plays Volume 2, edited by Leanna Keyes, Lindsey Mantoan, and Angela Farr Schiller. London: Methuen Drama, 2025
- The Methuen Drama Book of Trans Plays Volume 3: Young Adult Fiction, edited by Leanna Keyes, Lindsey Mantoan, and Angela Farr Schiller. London: Methuen Drama, 2026
