= Aleshia Brevard =

American author and actress

- Brevard in 1962
- Born: December 9, 1937; Erwin, Tennessee, U.S.
- Died: July 1, 2017 (aged 79); Scotts Valley, California, U.S.
- Education: Marshall University, Middle Tennessee State University
- Occupations: Actress; model; professor; author
- Years active: 1960s–2015
- Known for: Early gender transition
- Notable work: Woman I Was Not Born To Be: A Transsexual Journey

Aleshia Brevard (December 9, 1937 – July 1, 2017) was an American author and actress of stage, screen, and television. She worked as an entertainer, actress, model, Playboy bunny, professor of theater, and author. She also underwent one of the early sex reassignment surgery procedures performed in the United States. Brevard lived her life outside of the wider transgender community, and as a result, she was not publicly identified as transgender until publishing her memoirs in her later years.

== Early life ==
Brevard was born in Erwin, Tennessee on December 9, 1937, growing up in a religious family in a rural part of central Tennessee. She was close to her mother. Brevard always felt different from other children, like a girl inside, and prayed nightly to wake up a girl. Her teen years were awkward, and after a romantic disappointment in high school, she left right after graduation for the West Coast.

== San Francisco and transition ==
Ending up in San Francisco, Brevard found a job as a female impersonator at Finocchio's Club in San Francisco under the stage name Lee Shaw in the early 1960s, doing Marilyn Monroe impressions, eventually achieving enough renown that Marilyn herself came to a performance.

Brevard began her transition at 21 under the care of famed gender specialist Harry Benjamin in the late 1950s. At Benjamin's recommendation, Brevard underwent the surgical reassignment procedure in Los Angeles's Westlake Clinic under the care of surgeon Elmer Belt.

Brevard later worked as a stripper in Reno and as a Playboy bunny.

== Education ==
After a year's recovery post-surgery, she enrolled as a student at Middle Tennessee State University for her undergraduate education. During this period, she became more comfortable with her womanhood, got married, and took classes. This was at a time when she was a working actress, touring the U.S. doing theater, and working in film or television. She gained membership in Hollywood unions, and ultimately got her master's degree in Theater from Middle Tennessee State.

Through Benjamin, Brevard became friends in the late 1950s and 1960s with other transgender patients of his, including Charlotte Frances McLeod and Kathy Taylor, and they became a support network for each other. They had lunches with Benjamin, whom they considered to be a paternal mentor and friend.

== Attitude towards gender ==
Brevard's was one of the early medical transitions, and occurred before the term transgender had been coined and before there was a transgender community in San Francisco.

Brevard did not identify as trans early in her life and often deflected questions. Her husbands were not aware that she had transitioned. However she decided to change because she realized she was denying her own personal history. Once her memoir was published in 2001, she started to become labeled a "transsexual writer" and "transsexual actress". As she stated in her second book, "I'd been labeled—forced into a transsexual mold."

"Professionally, both as a film/stage actress and, later, as a university professor of theatre, my life was lived outside the gender community. Only after publishing two memoirs, when in my 60s and 70s, did I first hear the term 'transgender' and become aware of the community's stated agenda," she said in an interview in 2013. She also said in April 2017 "I did not go through gender reassignment to be labeled transsexual. I look at that as an awkward phase that I went through—sort of like a really painful adolescence. I don't even think of myself now in terms as transsexual. That's something I experienced and (something) I was.

"For me, as well as for my early sisters, the goal was never to live with a 't' before our names. Our objective was to blend so thoroughly that the things mixed could not be recognized. It was a choice, made not because we felt any shame about our transsexual history, but because our goal had always been to live fully as the women we'd been born to be."

In the book Bodies in the Making: Transgressions and Transformations (2006) by Nancy N. Chen, Brevard is interviewed by Mary Weaver discussing topics like gender, gender reassignment, the importance of personal history, and personal transformation.

== Screaming Queens: The Riot at Compton's Cafeteria ==
In 2005, Brevard was featured in Susan Stryker's documentary Screaming Queens: The Riot at Compton's Cafeteria. The documentary delved into a riot that broke out at Compton's Cafeteria, a popular eatery in the Tenderloin district in San Francisco in 1966. The riot predated the Stonewall riots by three years, leading to important advancements in transgender activism.

Brevard's role, in the Tenderloin and in the documentary, shed a light on trans women that "passed" more than other trans women did, and the differentiation of treatment that Brevard received over her other interviewed counterparts. As Brevard presented more feminine, even prior to her transition, she did not find it hard to make a life for herself compared to her peers as she was hired as a performer in the Tenderloin.

== Later life ==
After her work in television and film, she returned to Tennessee and received her M.A. in Theater Arts from Middle Tennessee State University. She met her first husband in Tennessee and had other marriages, which, according to her sister, did not work out. She returned to California in the late 1990s, settling outside of Santa Cruz, California with an old friend, finding work as a substitute teacher, and doing community theater.

Aleshia Brevard died at home in Scotts Valley, California on July 1, 2017, at the age of 79.

== Works ==
- Brevard, Aleshia (February 15, 2001). Woman I Was Not Born to Be: A Transsexual Journey. Philadelphia: Temple University Press. ISBN 978-1-4399-0527-2. OCLC 884015871.
- Brevard, Aleshia (March 1, 2015) [1st pub 2010]. The Woman I Was Born to Be. Aleshia Brevard. ISBN 978-0-9961344-2-2. OCLC 710814756.
- Brevard, Aleshia (October 7, 2015). Bilbo's Bend. Aleshia Brevard. ISBN 978-0996134446.

== Film and television ==
Film and television roles
Year	Title	Type	Role	Notes
1969	The Red Skelton Show	Television		TV debut; multiple appearances.
1969	The Love God?	Film	Sherry (one of "Peacock's Pussycats")	
1969	The Female Bunch	Film	Sadie	
1970	Big Foot	Film		
	One Life to Live	Television	Tex	ABC soap opera TV series.
1970	The Partridge Family	Television	Cocktail waitress	
	The Dean Martin Show	Television		
1972	Night Gallery	Television	Robot receptionist	"You Can't Get Help Like That Anymore" segment
1979	Legends of the Superheroes	Television	Giganta	
1980	The Man with Bogart's Face	Film	Mother the landlady	A comedy thriller.
	Smokey and the Judge	Film	Wally Lewis	
1981	Hard Country	Film	Snoopy Lady	
1981	American Pop	Film	"Showgirl #2" voice by Brevard	An adult animated musical drama film.
2005	Screaming Queens: The Riot at Compton's Cafeteria	Film	As self	A documentary film, featuring Brevard as a drag entertainer talking about how drag has opened doors of opportunity.

== Theater ==
Year	Theater show title	Role	Location	Notes
	Move Over Ms. Markham	Joanna Markham		
	Gingerbread Lady	Evy Meara		
	Seven Year Itch	The Girl Upstairs		
	The Shadow Box	Beverly		
	Steel Magnolias	Truvy Jones, a salon owner	Off-broadway in New York	
	Night of the Iguana	Maxine Faulk		
	Ruthless! The Musical	Emily Green	Chicago	A one-year long show.
	A Midsummer Night's Dream	Hyppolyta	Globe Theater	
	Subject to Change	Madeline Bassett		

== See also ==
- List of transgender people
- List of transgender-related topics

== Sources ==
- "Aleshia Brevard, transgender model, actress and writer". The Sydney Morning Herald. July 24, 2017.
- Ames, Jonathan (2002). "Of Breasts and Transhistories". My Less Than Secret Life: A Diary, Fiction, Essays. New York: Thunder's Mouth Press. ISBN 978-1-56025-375-4.
- Artavia, David (July 25, 2017). "Trans Trailblazer Aleshia Brevard Dead at 79". The Advocate.
- Brevard, Aleshia (2001). The Woman I Was Not Born To Be: A Transsexual Journey. Temple University Press. ISBN 1566398401.
- Brevard, Aleshia (2015). Bilbo's Bend. Aleshia Brevard. ISBN 978-0996134446.
- Chen, Nancy N. (2006). Bodies in the Making: Transgressions and Transformations. Berkeley, California: North Atlantic Books. ISBN 9780971254633.
- "Finocchio's 1961 Revue One of LaMonte's Best". The Times. San Mateo, California. February 3, 1961. p. 23.
- Kowalska, Monika (January 25, 2013). "Interview with Aleshia Brevard: Part 1". The Heroines of My Life.
- Kowalska, Monika (April 23, 2013). "Interview with Aleshia Brevard: Part 3". The Heroines of My Life.
- Whiting, Sam (April 24, 2017). "Aleshia Brevard, SF drag star and transgender pioneer, dies at 79". SFGate. Jeffrey M. Johnson. Archived from the original on July 25, 2017.
- "Screaming Queens: The Riot at Compton's Cafeteria (2005)". University at Buffalo Libraries. 2017. Archived from the original on October 27, 2018.
- Shepard, Nikita (November 20, 2017). "A Tennessee Trans Icon Comes Home: Remembering Aleshia Brevard". Spectrum South. Archived from the original on December 5, 2019.
- Waldron, Terri-Lynne (April 5, 2017). "Actress reflects on transitioning, Marilyn Monroe connection - Gay Lesbian Bi Trans News Archive". Windy City Times.
