= Transgender tipping point =

Term describing visibility of transgender people

Front cover of a May 2014 issue of Time magazine, featuring a full-body photo of Laverne Cox by Peter Hapak

The "transgender tipping point" is a term used to describe a rise in the prevalence and visibility of transgender people in popular culture which took place in the early to mid 2010s. The phrase was coined in the title of a cover article in the May 2014 issue of Time magazine which featured then up-and-coming transgender actress Laverne Cox.

The term initially implied a tipping point toward a new era of social progress in terms of transgender representation which followed a moment at which transgender people gained enough critical mass to do so. Commentators such as Nat Raha have since rejected the term as false due to a backlash against transgender visibility since the cover was published, which Cox herself has described as "genocidal".

== Background ==
Actress Laverne Cox had become well known for her role as Sophia Burset in the Netflix show Orange Is the New Black, becoming the first transgender black woman to have a leading role on a mainstream US television show. She had won several awards for her work. The Guardian has speculated that social media backlash to the non-inclusion of Cox in the Time 100 in April that year, through the hashtag #whereisLaverneCox, may have been a reason for the cover's existence.

== Time cover and article ==
The phrase was coined in the title of a cover article in the June 9, 2014 issue of Time magazine, written by Katy Steinmetz. The cover of the issue featured a full-body portrait of transgender actress Laverne Cox, who had recently risen to fame due to her role in the Netflix show Orange Is the New Black. On the cover, she looks boldly at the viewer as she stands in a tall, elegant stance. Distinct from other covers of the magazine, her head appears in place of part of the 'M' in 'TIME'.

The cover article, titled "The Transgender Tipping Point", describes how the year initiated a new era of the popular awareness of transgender people, discusses the transgender rights movement more generally, and contains quotes from an interview with Cox. One year before the legalization of same-sex marriage in the United States, Steinmetz argues in her article that the transgender rights movement would represent a new era in social progress.

== Responses ==
The words "transgender tipping point" were repeated in several news outlets over the course of 2014, including by The Washington Post. Jane Fae of The Guardian argued that year that "An unstoppable impulse is about to sweep away traditional ideas of gender – and we'll all benefit." Laurie Penny of the New Statesman attributed the increase of transgender visibility to the coming out of various transgender celebrities and the ability of social media to connect previously isolated individuals into forming communities.

Jian Neo Chen said in 2019 that the term drew from sociological, biological and technological popular theories. He stated that "the concept of the 'tipping point' attempt[ed] to absorb the gains won by trans justice movements into a 'free' market populist vision of social change in which the particular interests of a minority group circulate[d] just enough and under the right conditions to overtake or even 'infect' the majority." He said this was an incorrect approach as it "cancel[led] out the struggles, courage, labor, and creativity of social justice movement building to instead credit what is believed to be automated natural laws internal to American populism."

Amy Marvin argued in 2020 that narratives like the transgender tipping point represented a wave of "curiotization" of transgender people, whereby transgender lives and identities are portrayed as "unprecedented and always on the threshold of arrival" and trans people are turned into "curios" for outsiders to objectify.

In 2022, Danya Lagos in the American Journal of Sociology analysed US cohorts of the public born between 1935 and 2001 to determine whether there had been a "transgender tipping point" in regard to demographics. They found that respondents born after 1984 were "significantly more likely to identify as transgender or gender nonconforming than respondents in earlier cohorts", but that this varied "along lines of sex assigned at birth, race/ethnicity, and college attendance" which sometimes contrasted with media representation, and that there had been no singular "tipping point" but instead a gradual increase.

A 2019 Research Centre for Museums and Galleries article on the transgender tipping point noted that there was an increase in the amount of museum exhibitions and displays featuring transgender lives, but that those exhibitions often did not take into account the perspectives of transgender people themselves, and were largely not shaped out of an understanding of the human rights issues affecting the community. It noted the Museum of Transology as a counterexample to this.

Critics of the term have argued that while transfeminine people were represented as part of the "tipping point", transmasculine people were not included. Trans scholar Evelyn Deshane said there were "caveats to this tipping point acceptance" in 2017, including that transgender people "must look and act in certain ways" in order to be accepted. She also stated that the term had "no substance" as "we want to believe that we—along with our political systems and social circumstances—can change overnight," and that the term perpetuated the binary of "progress/failure".

Although the increased visibility generated support among the public, some have argued that the increase also triggered a backlash against transgender people and the movement for transgender rights. In 2024, Jude Doyle of Xtra Magazine argued that transgender rights had in fact significantly diminished in the ten years since the "tipping point". In 2023, Cox commented on the then-upcoming ten-year anniversary of her inclusion on the cover of Time, stating that "we are at the height of the backlash against trans visibility. We have way more people who are educated about trans folks, but there’s also been a rigorous misinformation media machine," further describing that "The backlash is ferocious. It’s genocidal."

== The "new transgender tipping point" ==
In April 2025, Virginia Weaver published a piece in The Carolinian titled "The new transgender tipping point", discussing the history of the term and its relevance in 2025. According to Weaver, "[each] of the activist pressure points Steinmetz surveys" in the 2014 Time article–including conflicts over sex-segregated restrooms, transgender athletes, and transgender youth–"would go on to become a crucial battleground in the gender wars over the next few years." Weaver also argues that in 2023, the "new transgender tipping point" had not yet arrived.

Then in May 2025, Transgender Europe (TGEU) published the Trans Rights Index and Map for the year under the heading "The new trans tipping point and Europe’s struggle for self-determination", stating that "for the first time in its 13-year history, setbacks in human rights of trans people across Europe and Central Asia now clearly outweigh progress." The publication contextualizes the report:

Coordinated anti-trans campaigns are converging with broader anti-rights and anti-EU forces, fueled by internal and external actors, from Trump-aligned global networks to the Kremlin. This is a defining moment: the new trans tipping point. As trans people fight for autonomy over their bodies and identities, Europe struggles for its identity and sovereignty.

— Trans Rights Index & Map 2025: The new trans tipping point and Europe’s struggle for self-determination

In 2026, Cox spoke about the TIME Magazine cover:

I love that how we as a community have been very critical of that [TIME magazine] framing. Was that indeed the tipping point? It was definitely an unprecedented moment of visibility for trans people, particularly in the United States, I would say.

== See also ==
- 2014 in the United States
- International Transgender Day of Visibility
- LGBTQ history in the United States
- Lists of covers of Time magazine
- Media portrayals of transgender people
- Transgender history
