= Sasha Masha =

2020 debut novel by Agnes Borinsky

- Author: Agnes Borinsky
- Language: English
- Genre: Young adult novel; Coming of age
- Publisher: Farrar, Straus and Giroux
- Publication date: November 10, 2020
- Pages: 240
- ISBN: 978-0-374-31080-6

Sasha Masha is a coming of age young adult novel by Agnes Borinsky, published November 10, 2020 by Farrar, Straus and Giroux. It tells the story of a teenager Jewish girl who, with the help of members the queer community, tries to figure out who her true self is.

The book was shortlisted in 2021 for a Lambda Literary Award.

== Reception ==
A review for the School Library Journal notes that the most interesting aspect of Borinsky's novel is its depiction of the "mental turmoil through [the main character's] neurotic, repetitive meditations on himself, the world, and what makes people 'Real.'" Despite that, the SLJ review was mostly critic of the novel, calling the plot "meandering", and mentioning the depiction of a drag queen as "verging on caricature". Kirkus Reviews commented on how the LGBT community and its history play a part on Masha's revelation of self and called the book a "sensitive and vulnerable story of self-growth."

The Booklist, which reviewed an audio version of the novel, said the author's "emotional connection with Sasha Masha creates a visceral listening experience" but criticized the tone used throughout the novel, which made it harder to tell which character was speaking at times.

Sasha Masha was a finalist for the Lambda Literary Award for Children's and Young Adult Literature (2021).

In 2022, a complaint was made to ban Sasha Masha in Clay County School District schools; however, it appears to have had no impact.
