= Else Went =

American playwright

- Born: 1989 or 1990 (age 35–36)
- Education: Sarah Lawrence College
- Occupation: Playwright
- Notable work: An Oxford Man; Initiative
- Spouse: Emma Rosa Went

Else Went (born 1989 or 1990) is an American playwright whose works An Oxford Man and Initiative have been nominated for the Susan Smith Blackburn Prize in 2025 and 2026 respectively. The former is a play based on the life of Laurence Michael Dillon, the first transgender man to undergo phalloplasty. The latter, a five-hour-long production set in the early 2000s and based on Dungeons & Dragons, was praised for its recreation of instant messaging and was described by The Guardian as "emotionally immersive".

== Career ==
Went grew up in Cambria, California and went to a public school before attending Sarah Lawrence College, graduating in 2013. In 2020, Went was a MacDowell Fellow, during which time she conceived and wrote the play An Oxford Man, based on the life of Laurence Michael Dillon, the first transgender man to undergo phalloplasty. An Oxford Man was a finalist for the Carlo Annoni Playwrighting Prize in 2023, and was also shortlisted for the 2025 Susan Smith Blackburn Prize, receiving a Special Commendation. The same year their play Degenerates was published in the The Methuen Drama Book of Trans Plays Volume 2. This play focuses on the experiences that transgender people may have when they engage with online incel communities.

In November 2025, Went's play Initiative premiered off-Broadway at The Public Theater. The play is set in the early 2000s and follows a group of young people who play Dungeons & Dragons. At five hours long, the play has three 90-minute acts, a deliberate choice by Went with the intention of creating "a new type of commitment" for audience members. Went first developed the concept for the what would become Initiative in 2011 in a class at Sarah Lawrence taught by Lucy Thurber, completing the first draft of the play in 2016. Went developed and expanded the play in 2018–19 during a fellowship at Playwrights Realm. It was reviewed by The Guardian as a "coming-of-age epic of sorts" which "flies right by, as emotionally immersive as the Dungeons & Dragons games that enrapture most of its seven teenage characters". Time Out noted in its review that the play was loosely autobiographical, praised its use of instant messaging from the era and described it as "a mesmerizing portrait of adolescents". The New York Stage Review was also positive, describing it as "the dramatic equivalent of a group bildungsroman". The New York Times review was mixed, also praising its use of instant messaging, but less positive about the use of Dungeons & Dragons; the reviewer Elisabeth Vincentelli compared the work less favourably to similar use in 2011's She Kills Monsters by Qui Nguyen. Initiative has been nominated for the 2026 Susan Smith Blackburn Prize.

== Selected plays ==
- An Oxford Man
- Degenerates
- Initiative

== Personal life ==
Went is a trans woman and uses she/her pronouns. She is married to theatre director Emma Rosa Went.
