= Azure D. Osborne-Lee =

American theatre maker (born 1984)

Azure D. Osborne-Lee (born September 1984) is an American playwright, educator, and theatre maker. His plays include Crooked Parts, which was published in The Methuen Drama Book of Trans Plays in 2021, and Mirrors, which premiered as part of Next Door at New York Theatre Workshop in 2020. Osborne-Lee is a faculty member at The New School's School of Drama. He is the founding producer of Roots and River Productions, a collective of queer and trans artists of color.

== Early life and education ==
Osborne-Lee grew up in Tennessee and Texas to scientist parents. His father is a chemical engineer. He began to perform at age 12, first acting as Squire Trelawney from Treasure Island. Osborne-Lee recalls being insistent on playing both male and female roles and knowing that theatre was their desired career early in life. They continued to act into adulthood, including in the performance piece "delta dandi" by Sharon Bridgforth at age 24. They moved from Texas to New York City in the summer of 2009.

Osborne-Lee received a BA in English & Spanish (2005) from the University of Texas at Austin. He struggled to find work post-graduation and returned to the University of Texas for an MA in Women & Gender Studies (2008). His study focused on Black women's hair care and aesthetics in the twenty-first century. They obtained an MA in Advanced Theatre Practice (2011) and are a PhD Candidate in Archiving for Disability Dance and Access Aesthetics (2029) at the Royal Central School of Speech and Drama in London. They hold a Certificate in Screenwriting (2025) from The New School.

== Career ==
=== Playwright ===
Osborne-Lee wrote their first play in the summer of 2009 while an intern at Freedom Train Productions in New York City. He began to develop the first act of Crooked Parts at Freedom Train's writing workshop.

Crooked Parts is a play that follows Winifred Clark, a young black girl struggling with change in 1995, and Freddy Clark, a 30-year-old trans man visiting home in 2013. The play portrays difficult familial relationships primarily in the style of realism, additionally including non-naturalistic elements such as puppetry and time travel to emphasize characters' emotions and relationships. Osborne-Lee identifies the play as semi-autobiographical- the first act was written in response to his research on Black women's hair and his own relationship with his mother, and the second act in response to returning home after transitioning and a break up.

Osborne-Lee wrote the second act of Crooked Parts in 2013, and began to revise the play at Rising Circle Theater Collective's INKtank, a play development program for artists of color. The play was showcased in Playbill's 2020 "Pride Plays" series with an official industry reading prior to being published in The Methuen Drama Book of Trans Plays in 2021. Crooked Parts was professionally staged in 2024 at the 4th Annual Obsidian Theatre Festival.

Osborne-Lee gained further recognition with his full length play Mirrors, a drama about Black queer women in 1960s Mississippi. Mirrors follows Alma Jean, a grieving teen who moves in with her deceased mother's ex-lover, the town pariah Bird Wilson. It contains themes of grief, trauma, and sustaining hope as a marginalized person. The play began as a commission from Freedom Train Productions in 2010. Mirrors won Parity Productions' 2018 Parity Development Award, allowing it to become Osborne-Lee's first full length work to receive a professional production. Mirrors premiered at the New York Theatre Workshop in 2020, but the production was halted before concluding its run by the COVID-19 pandemic. Parity Productions filmed the staged production to share to an online audience in 2021.

Osborne-Lee's other full length plays include "Glass", "The Beasts of Warren", and "Red Rainbow". In 2025, "Red Rainbow" was published in The Methuen Drama Book of Trans Plays Volume 2. Further writing has been published in the Dramatists Guild of America and Beyond the Binary: Eight Works by Nonbinary Playwrights.

=== Educator ===
Osborne-Lee previously taught as an adjunct professor at Quinnipiac University from 2021-2022. They have been an adjunct professor at New York University Tisch School of the Arts and a part-time lecturer at The New School College of Performing Arts for multiple years.

=== Other Ventures ===
In 2020, Prodigal Son Entertainment commissioned Osborne-Lee to write a short film titled "Sundown Support" for #WhileWeBreathe: a Night of Creative Protest.

Osborne-Lee the is founding producer of Roots and Rivers productions, a collective of queer and trans artists of color. The group aims to produce and support art of New York based Black LGBTQ creatives. They have offered workshops and mentorship programs since their founding in 2012.

== Personal life ==
Osborne-Lee has self-identified as "a fat Black nonbinary trans queer person". He uses both he/him/his and they/them/theirs pronouns interchangeably (See: Rolling pronouns).

== Honors and awards ==
Osborne-Lee is a still standing Artist-in-Residence sponsored by Stonehenge NYC.

Notable Honors
Year	Title	Result
2015	Mario Fratti-Fred Newman Political Play Contest, for Mirrors	Won
2018	Downtown Urban Arts Festival's Best Play Award, for Mirrors	Won
2018	Parity Productions' Development Award, for Mirrors	Won
2019	VanguardRep’s Summer Production	Finalist
2019	Burman New Play Award	Semi-finalist
2020	The Kilroys' List Selection	Won
2021	The Doric Wilson Award	Semi-finalist
2021	Waterwell New Works Lab’s Commission	Won
2025	GLAAD's Black Queer Creative Summit TV Pilot Pitch Competition, for "Quiet Kwame"	Special Runner-Up
