= Star Amerasu =

American electronic musician

Star Amerasu (also known by her DJ name Ah-Mer-Ah-Su) is an American musician, DJ, actress, filmmaker and internet personality.

First gaining popularity as a DJ and musician in the San Francisco Bay Area queer nightlife scene in the 2010s, Amerasu later became known for creating satirical videos on Instagram after one of her videos went viral in 2024. Since 2022, she has focused on acting and filmmaking, creating and appearing in several short films and theatre productions, and appearing alongside Brenna Jordan and Roz Hernandez in the OUTtv comedy series Sisters.

== Filmography ==
=== Short Films ===
Year	Title	Role	Notes
2024	After Hours	Harmony	Written and directed by Star Amerasu, produced by Elliot Page
2024	Saturn Risin9	Herself	Written by Saturn Risin9, directed by Tiare Ribeaux and Jody Stillwater
2023	I Guess	Herself	Written by Star Amerasu, directed by Star Amerasu and Aimee Hoffman. Produced as part of OUTFEST 2023’s Artist-in-Residence program
2023	The Audition	Ava	Written and directed by Chels Morgan
2022	Work	Dancer	Written and directed by April Maxey for AFI Directing Workshop for Women

=== Television ===
Year	Title	Role	Notes
2026	Sisters	Rebekeh	Created by Brenna Jordan and John Mark for OUTtv

== Theatre ==
Year	Title	Role	Notes
2026	Silverback Mountain: A New Gay Jungle Play	Miss Jackson	Off-off-Broadway production written by Mickey Gooch Jr. and directed by Sam LaFrage

== Discography ==
=== Albums ===
- Star (2018)
- Incandescent Body (2019)
- Never, Really Alone (2024)

=== EPs ===
- Eclipsing (2016)
- Rebecca (2017)
- Hopefully Limitless

=== Film Scores ===
- Major! (2015)
