= Southern Comfort (2001 film) =

2001 film by Kate Davis

- Directed by: Kate Davis
- Produced by: Kate Davis
- Cinematography: Kate Davis
- Edited by: Kate Davis
- Music by: Joel Harrison
- Distributed by: HBO Theatrical Documentary Presentations
- Release date: 2001
- Running time: 90 mins
- Country: United States
- Language: English

Southern Comfort is a 2001 documentary film about the final year in the life of Robert Eads, a transgender man. Eads, diagnosed with ovarian cancer, was turned down for treatment by a dozen doctors out of fear that treating such a patient would hurt their reputations. By the time Eads received treatment, the cancer was too advanced for his life to be saved.

== Plot ==
The film begins in the spring and documents Eads' life through the following winter. Eads falls in love with Lola, a transgender woman. He spends those remaining warm days in the company of his "chosen family": Maxwell, Cas, and "the rest". That summer, his mother and father drive ten hours to visit Robert, who is still their daughter in their eyes. His son and grandson also come to visit him that summer. His son struggles to gender him correctly and says he will always be "mom" in his eyes. But his grandson knows and has always known him as "papaw". Later that year, Eads makes his last appearance at the Southern Comfort Conference in Atlanta, Georgia, a prominent transgender gathering. Already feeling ill, he addresses a crowd of 500 and takes Lola to what is for them a prom that never was. Shortly after the conference, Eads dies in a nursing home with his chosen family beside him.

After Eads' death, his ashes were spread across the family farm around a lone Christmas tree which was to symbolize Robert's many changes and blossomings in life.

Eads' friends, Tom and Debbie King, also appear in the film. They saved Eads' life when he collapsed in a pool of his own blood while staying with them. They initially sought treatment for Eads but were unable to locate a doctor willing to treat a transgender man.

Eads' lifelong struggle to have his outer appearance match his inner self is a salient theme in the movie. All persons portrayed in the movie wrestle with themes of rejection from others, rejection of self, feeling ostracized from humanity and ultimately crafting their own lives and personal support systems.

== Reception ==
On the review aggregator website Rotten Tomatoes, 97% of 35 critics' reviews are positive. The website's consensus reads: "Kate Davis candidly tracks the lives of multiple trans individuals, most notably that of Robert Eads, a life worth celebrating and witnessing in this revelatory exploration of finding Southern Comfort."

== Stage adaptation ==
A stage musical, based on the film, was presented off-Broadway at the Public Theater. The musical was conceived by Robert DuSold and Thomas Caruso, with book and lyrics by Dan Collins and music by Julianne Wick Davis, and directed by Caruso. The musical ran from February 22, 2016 (previews) to March 27, 2016. Annette O'Toole was featured as Robert Eads, with Jeff McCarthy as "Lola Cola".

The musical had a workshop production by the off-off-Broadway CAP 21 Theatre Company from October 6, 2011 to November 5, 2011.

The musical then was produced at the Barrington Stage Company in Pittsfield, Massachusetts, in July 2013, as part of the BSC Musical Theatre Lab.

Julianne Wick Davis and Dan Collins won the Jonathan Larson Grant in 2012.

The stage adaption faced some criticism for its failure to cast more trans actors. All but two of the roles had been filled by cisgender actors. However, Pride Films & Plays in Chicago announced a new production in 2019 featuring trans performers playing all five transgender characters.

== Awards ==
- Grand Jury Prize (Documentary), Sundance Film Festival 2001
- First Prize, Seattle International Film Festival
- Special Audience Award, Berlin Film Festival
- Best International Feature Documentary, 2001 Hot Docs Canadian International Documentary Festival

== See also ==
- History of transgender people in the United States

Preceded by Long Night's Journey Into Day	Sundance Grand Jury Prize: Documentary; 2001	Succeeded by Daughter from Danang
