= Leanna Keyes =

American playwright, theatre producer, manager, and director

Leanna Keyes is an American playwright, theatre producer, manager, and director based in Memphis, TN and the San Francisco Bay Area. She is a queer, trans woman, with extensive experience in new play development. Keyes’ work is primarily focused on the experience of queer and trans individuals, particularly that of women. Her most notable play is Doctor Voynich and her Children, which was performed at Rhodes College and Stanford University before professionally premiered at Uprising Theatre Company in March 2020. That play is being published in the forthcoming The Methuen Drama Book of Trans Plays (which Keyes co-edited alongside Lindsey Mantoan and Angela Farr Schiller).

== Early life and education ==
Keyes earned a BA with honors in theatre and performance studies at Stanford University in 2014, where she was awarded the Sharifa Omade Edoga Prize for Work Involving Social Issues. During her time at Stanford, Keyes contributed essays and opinion pieces to the school's journal STATIC. She also co-wrote The Real World: Stanford with Olivia Haas as an introduction to Stanford life for freshman. The Real World first performed in 2013 for I Thrive@Stanford and continued to run annually from 2015-2017. The piece focused deeply on mental health, relationships, and sexual assault at Stanford.

== Career ==
Keyes began working as an Artistic Intern for Second Stage Theatre in June 2013, while still a student at Stanford. Between 2014 and 2019, she continued her career stage managing and production managing at various theatres in the San Francisco Bay Area and Tennessee. Throughout 2018, Keyes took up freelance work as a producer and in 2019, she became a resident playwright for Crosstown Arts in Memphis. She currently is the producer of Playwrights Foundation and the owner of the platform Transcend Streaming. Throughout the coronavirus pandemic, Keyes has worked as a streaming producer of digital content, producing shows for Shotgun Players, Theatre Mu, Company One Theatre, Playwrights Foundation, and StoryWorks Theater.

Keyes teaches a virtual class, "Ten Ways to Get a Laugh", which is hosted on Dragon Productions and teaches writers elements to develop laughter in a scene.

Her writing has been studied at universities across the United States such as Carnegie Mellon, Linfield University, the University of Kansas, Rhodes College, Stanford University, The Theatre School at DePaul University, and Western Carolina University.

== Plays ==
- lower case love (2012)
- Detours for Hummingbirds (2013)
- God Herself Could Not Sink this Ship (2013)
- The Kilogram Play (2013)
- Legal-Tender Loving Care (2013)
- The Real World: Stanford (co-written; 2013)
- Stir-Fried Strawberries (2015)
- Doctor Voynich and Her Children (2018)
- Two Ladies of Vermont (2019)
- You’re My Person (2019)
- Love Serving Love (2020)
- Moxi & Sirna
