= Robert Eads =

American transgender man

- Born: December 18, 1945; Toccoa, Georgia, U.S.
- Died: January 17, 1999 (aged 53); Toccoa, Georgia, U.S.
- Cause of death: Ovarian cancer

Robert Eads (1945–1999) was an American trans man, whose life and death was the subject of the award-winning documentary Southern Comfort (2001).

Eads transitioned later in life, and as such it was deemed inadvisable for him to seek gender-affirming surgery to male genitalia. Eads was diagnosed with ovarian cancer in 1996, but due to the social stigma faced by transgender individuals, more than a dozen doctors refused to medically treat him on the grounds that taking him on as a patient might harm their practice. When he was finally accepted for treatment in 1997, the cancer had "already metastasized to other parts of the body, rendering any further treatments futile."

== Family life ==
Eads began transitioning in his forties, after a marriage to a man and after having borne two children. Eads later described being pregnant as "the best and the worst (time) in my life," as he was thrilled by the feeling of having another life grow inside him, but was also disgusted by the fact that his pregnancy made him as a trans man feel even more "trapped" inside his body. He divorced his husband after the birth of their second son, and presented for some time as a lesbian, though he would later point out that he always viewed his attraction to women as the product of being a heterosexual man rather than a homosexual woman.

== Transition ==
Eads began transitioning in the late 1980s following a move to Florida. He began testosterone therapy and underwent top surgery, in which breast tissue is removed. However, given his age (early- to mid-40s) as well as the fact that he had already begun to show symptoms of menopause, Eads was counseled that he would not need to undergo a hysterectomy and oophorectomy as part of his sexual reassignment. Likewise, Eads never underwent phalloplasty. After living in Florida for some time, and following the failure of his second marriage (to a female psychologist), Eads moved back to Georgia in 1996.

In 1996, after a severe bout of abdominal pain and vagina bleeding, Eads sought emergency medical treatment, and received a diagnosis of ovarian cancer. However, more than a dozen doctors subsequently refused to treat Eads on the grounds that taking him on as a patient might harm their practice.

It was not until 1997 that Eads was finally accepted for treatment by the Medical College of Georgia hospital, where he underwent surgical, medical, and radiation therapy over the next year. By the time Southern Comfort was filmed in 1998, the cancer had metastasized to the uterus, cervix, and other abdominal organs, and his prognosis was poor. Despite aggressive treatment, Eads died in a nursing home in Toccoa, Georgia, in 1999 at the age of 53.

== See also ==
- FTM International
- Southern Comfort Synopsis
- Interview with Maxwell from Southern Comfort
- Robert Eads at IMDb
- Interview with Kate Davis
