= Traverse stage =

Style of theatre seating or performance

A traverse stage, also commonly known as an alley, corridor stage, tennis court, or catwalk, is a form of theatrical (theatre stage) in which the audience is predominantly on two sides of the stage, facing towards each other.

== Design ==
There are many practical implications for the actor performing on a traverse stage, such as the need for greater projection of voice (when the actor faces one audience, they turn their back to the other) and to make sure that every action is visible to both sides of the audience. From a design perspective, staging is very limited so as not to block sight lines across the stage. This means that audiences on either side get two perspectives and might experience very different shows. Furthermore, lighting the stage from one side only will cast a shadow over the actors' faces when viewed from the opposite side.

== Variants ==
In some traverse stages, one end of the stage space may also end on audience, making it similar to a thrust or three-quarter round stage. Other times, the ends of the stage are much larger than the traverse stage itself allowing for more space for actors, sets, and scenery. Although not commonly used for the production of plays, this form of staging is especially popular for catwalks.
