= New Conservatory Theatre Center =

Coordinates: 37°46′32″N 122°25′11″W

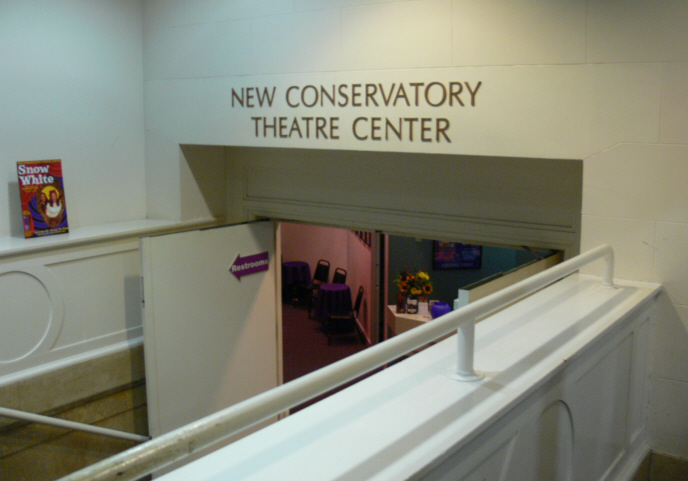
- Entrance to NCTC
- Interactive map of New Conservatory Theatre Center
- Address: 25 Van Ness Avenue; San Francisco, California; United States
- Owner: Non-profit
- Type: Theatre company

Construction
- Opened: 1981
- Years active: 1981–present

Website
- nctcsf.org

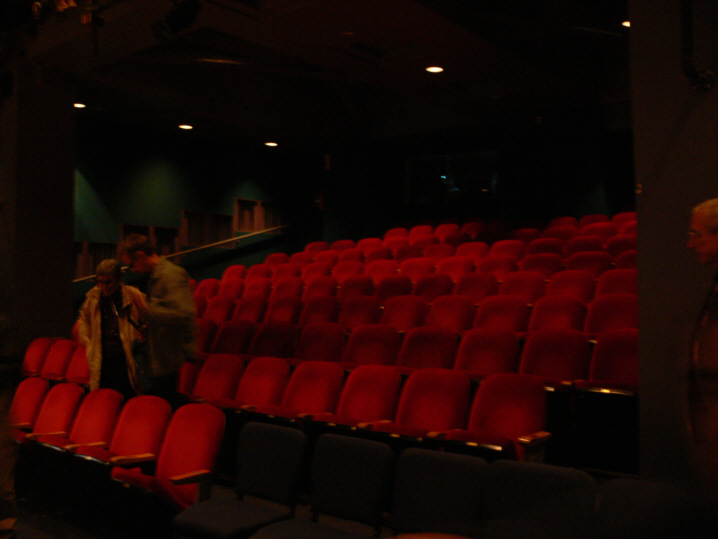
Auditorium of an NCTC stage

The New Conservatory Theatre Center (NCTC) is a not-for-profit theatre company located in the Civic Center neighborhood at 25 Van Ness Avenue, San Francisco, California. NCTC showcases a Pride Season, an In-Concert/Cabaret Series, Family Matinee performances, YouthAware Touring Educational Theatre, and an Emerging Artists program. NCTC also houses a comprehensive conservatory for youth and adults.

== Organizational history ==
Founded in 1981 as a small theatre arts conservatory for low-income youth by Ed Decker (a former director of the American Conservatory Theater’s Young Conservatory), NCTC has been in operation for over 40 years. In 1986, as a response to the AIDS epidemic heavily affecting San Francisco, Decker created the landmark YouthAware Touring Educational Theatre program, which has since expanded to address an array of health and wellness concerns, been translated into five languages, and achieved national and international recognition. To date, more than 4.5 million youth in the U.S., Germany, Australia, South Africa, Holland, and the U.K. have seen YouthAware Theatre-in-Education programs in their schools and communities. In 2004, Decker received the STOP AIDS Award for his work.

In 1995, Decker premiered the first Pride Season, a series of LGBT-themed performances that has since attracted many renowned LGBT and allied playwrights and directors. Decker has developed and/or premiered plays for NCTC’s main stage with artists such as Norman Allen, Terrence McNally, Edmund White, Joe Mantello, Mart Crowley, Brad Fraser, David Marshall Grant, Jonathan Harvey, Jewelle Gomez, and Lee Blessing.

== Programs ==
=== Theatre productions ===
NCTC's theatre performance program is anchored around their mainstage season, an eleven-month season featuring an average of eight plays and musicals. Plays are selected based on their examination of LGBT issues as they relate to the current world. NCTC also houses a Family Matinee program, featuring performances designed for children aged 4–10 and their families.

=== New Play Development Lab and Emerging Artists Program ===
In 2002, NCTC's New Play Development Lab was created to commission and develop new work to expand the canon of LGBT-themed plays, give voice to new and diverse playwrights, and add to the list of over 40 world premieres NCTC has produced since 1981. NCTC commissions, develops, and premieres approximately one new play each season, in addition to one new play for young audiences every 36 months to tour as part of the YouthAware Educational Theatre Program. Since the inception of the New Plays Development Lab in 2002, NCTC has commissioned several new plays, including Crucifixion by four-time Tony Award-winning playwright Terrence McNally. The NCTC Emerging Artists Program is a commissioning residency to develop and produce new work by emerging actors, singers, and writers, and to nurture the next generation of playwrights expanding the canon of queer and allied works.

=== Education Program ===
==== In-House Conservatory for Youth ====
NCTC offers classes for students of all ages in acting, singing, musical theatre, and playwriting at their downtown San Francisco location, serving about 200 youth annually.

==== Satellite Drama Program ====
NCTC sends highly qualified drama instructors into San Francisco County public schools, offering a wide range of after-school theatre arts classes in locations convenient to participants and their families. NCTC education programs meet the California Standards for Arts Education.

==== Vocational Training Program ====
Paid internships and positions are offered to interested students ages 13–19. Students are employed as teaching assistants, assistant stage managers, assistant directors, and technical theatre assistants. This program serves 7–12 students annually.

==== Adult Classes ====
NCTC has offered classes for adults in scene study, improvisation, singing, and playwriting.

=== YouthAware Educational Theatre ===
YouthAware is a repertoire of plays, educational materials, workshops, and structured discussions facilitated both in-house and toured throughout San Francisco schools. YouthAware programs reach over 20,000 youth per year, using performing arts as a vehicle for examining such issues as self-care, peer pressure, bullying, substance abuse, violence, homophobia, gender identity, stereotypes, race, cultural competency, and HIV/AIDS awareness.
