= Charlotte Frances McLeod =

Second American woman to travel to Denmark for a sex change operation

Charlotte Frances McLeod (February 26, 1925 – September 16, 2007) was the second American woman to travel to Denmark and undergo gender-affirming surgery. Before her transition, McLeod served in the army from 1948 to 1949. She was discharged from the Army for minor medical reasons.

== Life before transition ==
McLeod was born in Nashville, Tennessee, in 1925, but moved to Dyersburg, Tennessee, with her parents to live in her grandparents' home. McLeod's father recalled that she rarely engaged in sports or other games with boys.

McLeod was in the army from 1948 to 1949 and was discharged for minor medical reasons. When asked about why she left, McLeod stated: "Everyone could see that I was no soldier, and that it was all a mistake.”

McLeod was unable to get the plastic surgery in America she wanted. Instead, American doctors attempted to change her gender identity: "I’ve never been a boy—not in my mind. American doctors offered to make me more of a man, but could never give me a man’s mind”.

McLeod commented several times on the dire emotional state she was in due to her inability to be the gender she felt she truly was. During her time in America she felt suicidal due to her inability to receive surgery in America, stating: “I was treated neither as male or female—more as a nonentity…I was miserable and I wanted to die.”

== Surgery ==
McLeod, who had been living in Dyersburg, Tennessee, traveled to Copenhagen, Denmark at age 28, in the years 1953-1954, for the plastic surgery procedures that would allow her to transition from male to female. McLeod used an inheritance from a great aunt to pay for travel.

At that time, under Danish law, the operation could only be performed on Scandinavians. However, McLeod still underwent a sex-change surgery that was performed by professors and surgeons free of charge. McLeod's surgery was cited as being rather dangerous and unconventional. However, McLeod's intentions to return home a woman did not falter: “The thought of having come all this way in vain and return as the Charlie I hated was unbearable. So I managed to have the first operation made unofficially. It happened on a kitchen table at midnight and that’s all I want to say about that, but the operation almost killed me.”

=== Return home ===
For a short while after her surgery, McLeod lived in a boarding house operated by the Second Baptist Church. They eventually asked McLeod to leave, stating: "We have done what we could for Charlotte and we will continue to do our Christian duty toward a person in distress, but we just cannot take this. We have therefore told Charlotte that we thought it wisest if she found another place to stay until everything is quiet again."

However, upon returning home, McLeod found herself to be very happy and was surrounded by people who loved and supported her: “I fit right in where I left off. It’s wonderful to be back home. Friends don’t feel any different toward me now than before. They’ve accepted the many changes.”

== Career ==
McLeod performed a one-woman show once a week at SHO-BAR at 228 Bourbon Street in New Orleans, Louisiana. It was a nine-act show where she discussed different aspects of her transition. She also appeared as a comedienne in Green Village Bistro in Boston in 1954.

McLeod did not have a strong desire for this kind of career, but continued to work in entertainment in order to make enough money to live a normal life. She was quoted telling The San Francisco Examiner that: “She doesn’t look forward to night club work, but thinks it necessary to pay bills. She said she is looking forward to married life and a home of her own.”

=== Other jobs ===
McLeod was documented working as a secretary for six weeks, as well as demonstrating cosmetics at a Miami Beach shop.

=== Lawsuit ===
Elmo Badon, the owner of the Moulin Rouge at 231 Bourbon Street in New Orleans, sued McLeod in 1954. Badon claimed that McLeod was meant to perform as an entertainer at his club but then had later refused. The judge, Rene A. Viosca, signed a restraining order against McLeod that temporarily stopped her from appearing in any night club as an entertainer.

Badon eventually lost the case and the restraining order was lifted.

== Name change ==
McLeod was able to change her name from Charles Earnest McLeod to Charlotte Frances McLeod at age 29. The petition for the name change was filed by attorney R.C. Colton, Jr., who stated: "Applicant at all times wears women's clothing and other articles of dress and cosmetics peculiar to the female sex."

McLeod's passport was issued to "Charlotte Frances McLeod, a female."

== Marriage and family life ==
McLeod was married at age 34 in Miami, Florida. Since Florida marriage law does not require a birth certificate for individuals 21 and over, McLeod was allowed to marry a man despite being legally male. McLeod's husband, Ralph H. Heidal, was from New York and was 36 years old when he married McLeod. The couple were married on October 11, 1959.

=== Relationship with father ===
McLeod's father, Charles McLeod Sr., worked in insurance. He and McLeod's mother divorced and were each remarried. Charles had two other daughters with his second wife. Originally, Charles was against McLeod's operation because American doctors had warned him it would be dangerous for McLeod's health. When he learned that a Memphis psychiatrist was giving her hormones, he walked out of the office in disgust. Because of the threat that surgery would have to McLeod's life, Charles told McLeod that he would not help her.

However, after McLeod returned, her father stated: “I was opposed to the operation, but now that it’s over, I’m ready to support Charlotte as my daughter.” He was also quoted saying other supportive claims such as:

“It's a little hard to get used to after all these years. But I will, you can bet on that.”

“I guess he always wanted to be a girl.”

“I was happy to see her. I hope that this change will be better. I hope she'll be happy.”

== Comparisons to Christine Jorgensen ==
Christine Jorgensen was the first widely known transgender woman to travel to Denmark in order to have operations that would allow her to transition from male to female. McLeod had stated to newspapers that she had planned to go to Denmark to receive surgery before Jorgensen.

McLeod was known to have a dislike towards Jorgensen. At one of her one-woman shows, she was quoted saying: "I just wish she'd come in here some night so I could yell 'Check your hat, mister'."

McLeod's story was written in the press to be very different from Jorgensen's. Generally, Jorgensen was presented as a positive example of a trans woman, while McLeod was often mocked by the press. Time magazine wrote: "Charlotte's story resembles Christine's. He was a sensitive boy, quiet and lonely, with a penchant for dressing up in women’s clothing. Like Christine, he was drafted into the Army; unlike Christine, he found it too hard."

McLeod stated that since controversy arose from Jorgensen's transformation, she had to go about hers in secret.

Jorgensen, when told about McLeod, said she had no advice to give: "People get exactly what they give out. I feel that a person makes his own way and his attitudes are reflected through other people. I cannot offer advice to anyone else. I can say only what I have done. At all times, I have conducted myself like a lady."

== Press ==
An incident between McLeod and the press was discussed frequently in many articles just after her arrival to America from Denmark. Upon returning home, McLeod was being photographed leaving the Hotel Statler, where she was staying. Overwhelmed by all the chaos, McLeod hit a photographer by the name of Glenn D. Everett with her umbrella. McLeod declined going to the hospital afterwards despite her stomach pains.

During the incident, McLeod was quoted stating: "Go away...I can't say anything."

Everyone involved in the incident was taken to the police station.

Charges of assault against McLeod were initially filed but were then taken down.

== Autobiography ==
McLeod published an autobiography discussing her life and her transition in Mr. Magazine. In her autobiography she discussed issues such as the distinction between homosexuals and drag queens. She also displayed a dislike towards New Orleans gay counterculture, stating: “I was appalled at their insincerity, insecurity, and promiscuity practiced among them. I did feel a great sympathy for many of these young men and women who I met, but I could find no peace of mind among them.”
