= Sharifa Yazmeen =

Egyptian-American playwright and theatre director

- Born: Saudi Arabia
- Education: Brown University
- Occupations: Theatre director; playwright
- Website: www.sharifayazmeen.com

Sharifa Yazmeen is an Egyptian-American playwright and theatre director. Two of her plays have been featured in The Methuen Drama Book of Trans Plays.

== Early life ==
Yazmeen was born in Saudi Arabia; her father is Egyptian and her mother is a White American. She grew up in North and South Carolina as a practicing Muslim.

== Career ==
She has an MFA in directing from Brown University.

In 2021, Yazmeen was the inaugural winner of the Barbara Whitman Award, which recognizes "a female, trans, or nonbinary early-career director who has demonstrated a unique vision in their work". Her 2023 direction of Disgraced by Ayad Akhtar was praised as using choices that created an "impending doom, horror movie-style" for the production. In 2024 she was one of two inaugural winners (with Violeta Picayo) of the Abe Burrows Award for Assistant Directors.

The University of Kansas Theatre produced Yazmeen's play The Devils Between Us in 2021; a professor there called the play "an engaging and transformative piece of storytelling". It is one of eight plays featured in the 2021 volume The Methuen Drama Book of Trans Plays. In the play, a trans Arab-American woman returns to her home town due to the death of her father. The introduction in Methuen's volume says the work "pushes back against homonationalist rhetoric that vilifies Muslims, de-exoticizing Egyptian heritage". They place it as one of the plays written by authors from the South that deal with race and womanhood.

An online reading of her play Close to Home was presented as part of the Bay Area Playwrights Festival in San Francisco in 2022. The play follows three strangers: a transfeminine teenager, a builder and a Muslim immigrant. It premiered at Pillsbury House + Theatre in 2025. The play is included in the second volume of The Methuen Drama Book of Trans Plays. She was awarded a Jerome Fellowship by the Playwrights' Center (2025–2027).

== Personal life ==
Yazmeen is a transgender woman.

== Selected works ==
=== Plays ===
- The Devils Between Us
- Close to Home
- Bone by Bone
- Lilith's Tears

=== Directing credits ===
- Babel by Jacqueline Goldfinger, Contemporary American Theater Festival (2022)
- Disgraced by Ayad Akhtar, American Stage (2023)
