= Raphael Khouri =

Jordanian playwright and activist

Raphael Amahl Khouri
- Born: United States
- Other names: Raphaël Amahl Khouri, Amahl Raphaël Khouri
- Education: Lebanese American University (BA)
- Occupations: Documentary playwright; journalist; activist; theatre artist
- Website: raphaelkhouri.com

Raphael Amahl Khouri (Arabic: رافئيل خوري; previously Amahl Raphael Khouri) is a Jordanian queer, transgender documentary playwright, journalist, activist, and theatre artist. Khouri lives in Berlin and Egypt.

== Early life and education ==
Raphael Amahl Khouri was born in the United States, and moved to Saudi Arabia before he lived his teenage years in Jordan. He is of Arab and German heritage.

Khouri received a bachelor's degree (BA) in communications from the Lebanese American University in Beirut, Lebanon. While attending school in Saudi Arabia, he aspired to become an actor or an artist. Throughout college, he wanted to do theatre, but his father would not let him.

Khouri left Beirut in 1997 because being queer was illegal and moved to San Francisco, California, where he could be out. Facing poverty, he worked many jobs to survive, including retail sales, being an elementary school teacher, a graphic designer, and more.

== Career ==
Khouri worked as a news editor in Paris but quit in 2008 and moved back to Beirut to pursue his theatre ambitions. Khouri started his career as a journalist but was introduced to documentary theatre through a festival in Alexandria, Egypt.

Khouri was initially an apprentice to a stage director in Lebanon, but found it difficult to enter the directing world.As a result, Khouri turned to journalism while he set out to write his own play. Taking inspiration form Antonin Artaud (among other theorists), Khouri decided to explore writing within the documentary theatre genre.

Khouri has also been commissioned to write new work for the Outburst Queer Arts Festival in Belfast (features in 2019 and 2020), and he will appear in the upcoming International Queer Drama anthology published by Neofelis Verlag, and The Methuen Drama Book of Trans Plays.

== Plays and publications ==
=== Ich brauche meine Ruhe (I Need Some Peace and Quiet) ===
First performed at the Politik im Freien Theatre Festival in 2018.

=== No Matter Where I Go ===
First performed in Beirut in 2014, No Matter Where I Go is a play that explores how queer people navigate public spaces and how their identity is constantly questioned within these spaces. Khouri explains that the Lebanese media is profit-oriented and often misrepresented homosexuality and queerness. No Matter Where I Go actively fights against stigmatization by elevating narratives that disrupted the hegemony portrayed in Lebanese media.

This was the first queer Arab performance of its kind. Though some Arab plays had some gay content, this was the first work that went out of its way to be queer. This text was performed as pot of “Bodies in Public” a conference on bodies in Beirut. It is published in the anthology, Global Queer Plays.

=== Oh, How We Loved Our Tuna ===
This work was created for Climate Change Theatre Action, a worldwide festival where plays regarding the current global climate crisis are performed with the intent of inspiring action. Khouri describes this play as an elegy to all the fish that have been killed due to climate change. Khouri stated, "That’s what happened to the tuna, they loved it so much that they’ve killed it.”

=== She He Me ===
A piece of documentary theatre containing true stories of violence and abuse, as well as humor. It follows the lives of three Arab characters who are navigating the challenges that societal gender norms bring. Randa, an Algerian trans woman who lives in Sweden, is forced to leave her homeland in order to stay alive due to the death threats received for her activism on LGBTQ rights. Omar, an old gay Jordanian male who lives in Amman, suffers from both body and gender dysphoria, recalling the emotional and physical abuse he endured at a young age by his family. Finally, Rok is a Lebanese man who lives in New Jersey. His story entails his struggle between his mother and him coming to the realization that he was trans.

It was staged in 2019 at the Kosmos Theatre in Vienna. It was again staged in 2020 (online), and again in 2024 during the Criminal Queerness Festival in New York City.

=== It Was Paradise, Unfortunately ===
Performed in 2024 by both Raphael Amahl Khouri and Myrto Stampoulou, with a running time of 60 minutes. Khouri takes his audience around the world, combining his findings from his three-year long study of the Greek god of theatre, Dionysus. It has been described as a show that ends up redefining what theatre could be, leaving the audience with newfound knowledge, stating it to be “better than a lecture in university in every single way" and that it “makes an extraordinary ground-breaking discovery.”

== Fellowships ==
- Recipient of Rosenthal Emerging Voices Fellowship for poetry from PEN USA (Los Angeles 2007)
