= Ty Defoe =

Ojibwe and Oneida performance artist, activist and writer

Ty Defoe is an Ojibwe and Oneida performance artist, activist, and writer living in New York.

Defoe grew up in Wisconsin in the Ojibwe and Oneida communities of his parents. Defoe is two-spirit, a term used in many Native American nations to indicate gender fluidity, non-traditional gender roles, or queerness. He began his performative life as a toddler when he learned to hoop dance. Defoe continues to hoop dance in his performances, along with eagle dancing, puppetry, and other various art forms. With Lakota playwright and choreographer Larissa Fasthorse, Defoe founded Indigenous Direction, a "a consulting firm that helps organizations and individuals who want to create accurate work by, for and with Indigenous peoples". Indigenous Direction's clients include The Guthrie Theater.

== Career ==
Defoe holds degrees from the California Institute of the Arts, Goddard College, and New York University's Graduate Musical Theatre Writing Program at Tisch School of the Arts. He works with indigenous populations such as the Alaska Native Heritage Center and the Hawaiian Playwrights Initiative, among others. He is also a member of the youth council at the East Coast Two-Spirit Society. He received a Grammy award for Best Native American Music Album for his work on Come to Me Great Mystery: Native American Healing Songs. Defoe is a member of the Dramatists Guild of America.

DeFoe has written, produced, and performed in many theatre productions, including Clouds are Pillows for the Moon, In the Cards, Heather Henson's Flight: A Crane’s Story, Tick, Tick, and Honor +Family. Additionally, he collaborated on the Grammy Award-winning album, Come to Me Great Mystery, featuring the work of several Native American musicians. Beginning in June 2018, he, with Kate Bornstein, portrayed stage versions of themselves as "interlocutors of indeterminate gender" in the Broadway premiere of Young Jean Lee's play Straight White Men.

== Awards and recognition ==
Defoe is featured in the book 50 Key Figures in Queer US Theatre, with a profile written by theatre scholar Courtney Elkin Mohler. He was a finalist for the inaugural Barbara Whitman Award in 2021. In 2026, he was named a United States Artists (USA) Fellow.

== List of theatre works ==
Name	Collaborators	Production History	Year
Honor + Family	Lyrics: Ty Defoe; Book: Nolan Doran; Music: Collin Martin	West Village Musical Theatre Lab	2012
Clouds Are Pillows For the Moon	Book and lyrics: Ty Defoe; Music: Tidtaya Sinutoke	New York University; Collaborative Development Production (CDP) Workshop; Yale Institute for Music Theatre; B-Side Production	2013; 2014; 2014; 2014
In the Cards	Book and lyrics: Ty Defoe; Music: Tidtaya Sinutoke	New York University; Boston-International Contempo Festival	2013; 2014
Heather Henson's Flight: A Crane's Story	Play and consulting: Ty Defoe; Producing and story: Heather Henson		
Tick, Tick	Book and lyrics: Ty Defoe; Music: Tidtaya Sinutoke	Prospect Theatre Company Lab-West End Theatre	2014
