= MJ Kaufman =

American playwright

- Occupations: Playwright; lecturer
- Employer: NYU’s Tisch School of the Arts
- Known for: Sagittarius Ponderosa; A Transparent Musical
- Parent: Laura Schulz
- Relatives: Kathryn Schulz (aunt)
- Website: https://mjkaufman.com/

MJ Kaufman is an American playwright and academic, who is Head of Playwriting at NYU's Tisch School of the Arts. Their plays often deal with themes relating to transgender relationships or queer perspectives, including Sagittarius Ponderosa, Seven Deadly Sins and Galatea or Whatever You Be. Based on Amazon Prime's Transparent, Kaufman also co-wrote A Transparent Musical. They have been the recipient of a Helen Merrill Emerging Writers Award and the Jane Chambers Prize in Feminist Theatre.

== Career ==
Kaufman was educated at Wesleyan University and Yale School of Drama. In 2016 Eat And You Belong To Us, a play about transgender life in the USA, debuted at the Lesbian, Gay, Bisexual & Transgender Community Center in New York City. It is inspired by the relationship between a transgender grandparent and their trans grandchild, as well as medieval chronicles and Joan of Arc. A further work that year, Sagittarius Ponderosa, used magical realism to portray the life of a transgender man called Archer. The play was noted for its multi-sensory production, including the audience inhaling the scent of Ponderosa pine. Premiering at the New Conservatory Theatre Center in San Francisco in February 2016, the San Francisco Examiner reviewed Kaufman's writing as having a "gift for dialogue but fall[ing] short of offering a distinct point of view". This sentiment was echoed by the New York Times who praised the production and sound design, but felt the characterisation was "flat".

Sensitive Guys was also developed in 2016 and is a play that addresses toxic masculinity and rape culture on university campuses. It debuted in 2018 at InterAct Theatre. A review in Philadelphia described the play as "big on dogma, short on insight" and suggested that the "well-produced but often irritating" play left audiences without nuanced insight into the issues it portrayed. In 2018 they were interviewed by the New York Times with Basil Kreimendahl and Jess Barbagallo to discuss what it means to be transgender and a playwright. All three expressed frustration with the limitations societally imposed and the expectation that a "trans play" is only likely to be a coming-out play.

In 2021, during the COVID-19 pandemic, Kaufman was one of seven writers who contributed short plays to the production Seven Deadly Sins. This was an outdoor performance where each play was performed in an empty shopfront in the Meatpacking District of New York. Audience members used headsets to hear the sound and dialogue. Each writer responded to a different deadly sin: Kaufman's was pride. Other writers included Ngozi Anyanwu, Thomas Bradshaw, Moisés Kaufman (who also directed the show), Jeffrey LaHoste, Ming Peiffer and Bess Wohl; the addressed the respective sins of gluttony, sloth, greed, envy, wrath and lust. Variety reviewed the show as a "well-curated, innovative theatrical experience [that] stretches the limits of traditional performance". The New York Theatre Guide reviewed Kaufman's contribution as one that "captures the contradictions of queer life in the United States, where some can happily monetize their identities while others still live in fear, with quick wit and incredible precision". The New York Times reviewed is as "a pointed critique of the commercialization of queer advocacy".

Also in 2021, Kaufman's Galatea or Whatever You Be, a genderqueer translation of Gallathea by John Lyly, was debuted. Described as a "trans love story set against the backdrop of a climate crisis", the work was directed by Mo Zhou. Kaufman was explicit about sexual politics in the play, portraying "Diana and her nymphs a ‘lesbian separatist commune’". Based on Amazon Prime's Transparent, A Transparent Musical was co-written by Kaufman with Joey Soloway and Faith Soloway. It was debuted in 2023 by the Center Theatre Group. Kaufman's 2024 work A Walrus in the Body of a Crocodile also examined gender and society.

As of 2026 Kaufman is Head of Playwriting at NYU's Tisch School of the Arts.

== Personal life ==
Kaufman is originally from Portland; they are transgender. Their mother is psychologist Laura Schulz and their aunt is journalist Kathryn Schulz.

== Awards ==
- 2010: Jane Chambers Prize in Feminist Theatre
- 2013: ASCAP Cole Porter Prize in Playwriting
- 2017: Helen Merrill Emerging Writers Award

== Selected works ==
- Eat And You Belong To Us (2016)
- Sensitive Guys (2016)
- Sagittarius Ponderosa (2016)
- Galatea or Whatever You Be (2021)
- 'Wild Pride' in Seven Deadly Sins (2021)
- A Transparent Musical (2023)
- A Walrus in the Body of a Crocodile (2024)
