= Into the Wild =

Into the Wild may refer to:

== Book ==
- Into the Wild (Krakauer book) (1996), non-fiction book by Jon Krakauer about Chris McCandless
- Warriors: Into the Wild (2003), novel by Erin Hunter

== Film ==
- Into the Wild (film) (2007), directed by Sean Penn, based on the Krakauer book

== Music ==
- Into the Wild (soundtrack) (2007), by Eddie Vedder for the Penn film
- "Into the Wild" (LP song), 2012
- "Into the Wild" (Josh Baldwin song), 2020
- Into the Wild (Uriah Heep album) (2011)
- Into the Wild: Live at EastWest Studios (2012), EP by singer LP
- Into the Wild Tour (2010–11), by Thirty Seconds to Mars

== Television ==
- Into the Wild (TV series) (2014), directed by Jared Leto, based on a tour by Thirty Seconds to Mars

== See also ==
- Call of the Wild (disambiguation)
- Christopher McCandless
