= Churches (album) =

Studio album by LP
- Released: December 3, 2021
- Genres: Pop; rock; indie rock; synth-pop; country folk
- Length: 52:48
- Labels: SOTA; Dine Alone
- Producers: Mike Del Rio; Valley Girl; Dan Nigro; Isabella Summers; Dan Wilson

LP chronology
Heart to Mouth (2018)	Churches (2021)	Love Lines (2023)

Singles from Churches
- 1. "The One That You Love" Released: July 23, 2020; 2. "How Low Can You Go" Released: November 19, 2020; 3. "One Last Time" Released: March 11, 2021; 4. "Goodbye" Released: July 9, 2021; 5. "Angels" Released: October 8, 2021; 6. "Conversation" Released: December 3, 2021

Churches is the sixth studio album by American singer-songwriter LP, released on December 3, 2021, through SOTA/Dine Alone. It was produced by Mike Del Rio and co-written by Nate Campany.

The album was originally planned for an October 2020 release. It was later announced for October 6, 2021, then postponed to the following month and finally pushed back to December 3. Four additional songs were written throughout the additional 14 months that the album spent in the making.

== Background ==
LP composed much of the album in San José del Cabo, Mexico. The hotel where they stayed, El Ganzo, is featured in the video for "How Low Can You Go". The singer used all their guitars and ukuleles in Nashville tuning. The final track list combines songs written before and after the COVID-19 pandemic.

=== Title ===
The title is taken from one of the album's tracks, which was the first to be written. LP was barred from entering a church in Saint Petersburg unless they covered their head, and that got them thinking that they don't want to be told how to believe in God and live their religion. It further made them reflect on what is sacred for them and that love could act as a religion for people in general.

== Song information ==
The opening track "When We Touch" was the first song to be written after the Coronavirus spread. "Goodbye" was released on July 9, 2021, and had its video shot near Marina del Rey and Malibu, California.

"The One That You Love" was the first single to be released, on July 23, 2020. It was accompanied by a video shot at Big Sky Ranch in which LP is seen riding a horse around the place. A video for an acoustic version of the song was released later that year, in October.

"Rainbow" was inspired by LP's decision to break up with their fiancée, and its lyrics discuss "the battles we choose to fight and how long we're willing to fight them", which is inspired by LP's reluctance as a teenager to come out to their alcoholic, abusive father.

"One Last Time" was released as a single on March 11, 2021, and its video features Jaime King. "How Low Can You Go" was filmed at the Hotel El Ganzo, in San José del Cabo, where they composed much of the album. In the video, they are cast opposite Mexican actress Julieta Grajales, with whom they have a "sentimental relationship".

"Angels" and "Conversation" were released as singles on October 8 and December 3, respectively, and their videos were shot on the same day at Steve Vai's house. The latter shows two versions of LP discussing with each other. The lyrics are a self-conversation in which they try to convince themself to carry on with a relationship, and they also saw the song as a love letter to their ex-girlfriend and fellow musician Lauren Ruth Ward. It was co-produced by Nate Campany and Kyle Shearer.

"Yes" tells the story of how John Lennon and Yoko Ono met during a latter's art exhibit. "Can't Let You Leave" was inspired by the same person who inspired their 2015 hit "Lost on You". Its initial chords are performed on the same guitar LP used to compose the song years before. "Poem", the closing track, was the last song to be written and performed for the album.

== Critical reception ==
Professional ratings
Review scores
Source	Rating
The Independent	5/5 stars

Helen Brown from The Independent called the album "confidently genre-fluid, it fills its sails with powerful blasts of synth pop; tilts and tumbles on the choppier waves of indie rock and drifts on peaceful currents of ukulele-plucked folk." She finished the review by saying that "Churches is LP at their best: cursing and worshipping at love’s altar."

Writing for Renowned for Sound, Mike Corner compared the title track to Hozier's "Take Me to Church" and pointed out the diversity of the album (instrumentally-wise) while commenting that love remains its main subject matter.

== Track listing ==
All music produced by Mike Del Rio, except where noted

Churches track listing
No.	Title	Writer(s)	Length
1.	"When We Touch"	Laura Pergolizzi; Nate Campany; Michael Gonzalez	2:52
2.	"Goodbye"	Pergolizzi; Campany; Gonzalez	3:46
3.	"Everybody's Falling in Love"	Pergolizzi; Campany; Gonzalez	3:55
4.	"The One That You Love"	Pergolizzi; Campany; Gonzalez	3:43
5.	"Rainbow"	Pergolizzi; Campany; Gonzalez	3:51
6.	"One Last Time"	Pergolizzi; Alexander Feder; Gonzalez	3:13
7.	"My Body"	Pergolizzi; Nicholas Leng; Gonzalez	4:02
8.	"Angels" (co-produced by Valley Girl)	Pergolizzi; Campany; Kyle Shearer; Gonzalez	3:39
9.	"How Low Can You Go"	Pergolizzi; Campany; Gonzalez	3:23
10.	"Yes"	Pergolizzi; Lars Stolfer	3:07
11.	"Conversation" (produced by Valley Girl)	Pergolizzi; Campany; Shearer	4:46
12.	"Safe Here" (produced by Nigro)	Pergolizzi; Dan Nigro	3:42
13.	"Can't Let You Leave" (co-produced by Summers)	Pergolizzi; Isabella Summers; Gonzalez	4:20
14.	"Churches" (co-produced by Dan Wilson)	Pergolizzi; Daniel Dodd Wilson	3:13
15.	"Poem"	Pergolizzi	1:16
Total length:			52:48

== Personnel ==
- Emily Lazar – mastering
- Mike Del Rio – executive production
- Isabella Machine Summers – production
- Lars Stolfer – production
- Dan Wilson – production
- Dan Nigro – production

== Charts ==
Chart performance for Churches
Chart (2021–2022)	Peak position
Belgian Albums (Ultratop Wallonia)	54
French Albums (SNEP)	75
Italian Albums (FIMI)	88
Lithuanian Albums (AGATA)	73
Polish Albums (ZPAV)	39
Swiss Albums (Schweizer Hitparade)	33
