= Forever for Now (LP album) =

Studio album by LP
- Released: June 2, 2014
- Genre: Pop
- Length: 47:59
- Label: Warner Bros. Records
- Producer: Rob Cavallo

LP chronology
Into the Wild: Live at EastWest Studios (2012)	Forever for Now (2014)	Death Valley (2016)

Singles from Forever for Now
- 1. "Into the Wild" Released: May 21, 2012; 2. "Night Like This" Released: March 21, 2014; 3. "Tokyo Sunrise" Released: May 26, 2014; 4. "Someday" Released: May 30, 2014

Forever for Now is the third studio album by American singer-songwriter LP. The album was released through Warner Bros. Records on June 2, 2014, and is their major label full-length debut.

== Background ==
LP released two independent studio albums, Heart-Shaped Scar (2001) and Suburban Sprawl & Alcohol (2004), which were commercially unsuccessful. After that, they started writing songs for other artists, most notably for Rihanna ("Cheers (Drink to That)"), Backstreet Boys, and Christina Aguilera.

Following a record deal signed with Warner Bros. Records in September 2011, LP recorded a song titled "Into the Wild", which was prominently used in a Citibank TV commercial in the end of 2011. In April 2012, LP released an extended play Into the Wild: Live at EastWest Studios, and "Into the Wild" was released as a single in May 2012. LP started touring, which pushed the release of their major-label debut album back. Initially, the album was going to sound as "a bit more of an acoustic thing," however, LP and producer Rob Cavallo started adding more layers to the songs, and eventually their sound grew bigger.

== Promotion ==
The first official single to promote Forever for Now, "Into the Wild", was released on May 21, 2012. "Night Like This" was released as the second single on March 21, 2014. "Tokyo Sunrise" was released as the third single on May 26, 2014. "Someday" was released the fourth single on May 30, 2014.

On June 17, 2014, LP performed on The Late Late Show with Craig Ferguson, broadcast by CBS.

== Critical reception ==
Professional ratings
Review scores
Source	Rating
AllMusic	4/5 stars
American Songwriter	3.5/5 stars
High Voltage Magazine	9.8/11
Today	4.5/5

Stephen Thomas Erlewine of AllMusic rated the album four out of five stars, and wrote that "there's a sharp, stylish gleam to the very sound of Forever for Now, a combination of LP's savvy pop sensibility and the cool commercial instincts of Rob Cavallo." He added that Cavallo "accentuates and accessorizes the contours of her [LP's] songs without diluting the eccentricities. He gives her plenty of space to roam, allowing her to soar as high as a skyscraper on 'Tokyo Sunrise' and 'Salvation,' but also knows when to keep things intimate, as on the haunting coda of the title track."

American Songwriter's Jim Beviglia wrote that "Forever for Now is filled with sprawling pop songs that soar to heights meant to maximize the impact of Pergolizzi's unreal voice," which he compared to a cross between Ronnie Spector and Florence Welch. However, he commented that the album's main drawback is the fact that almost every song seems to be "meticulously crafted and ready for radio airplay," as listening to the entire album "reveals a certain sameness in approach: Quiet, atmospheric opens, cloud-bursting choruses, and a few of LP's wordless banshee wails thrown in for good measure."

== Track listing ==
No.	Title	Writer(s)	Length
1.	"Heavenly Light"	Dave Bassett; LP	3:50
2.	"Night Like This"	Nate Campany; LP; Mike Del Rio	4:00
3.	"One Last Mistake"	Tom Hull; LP	3:35
4.	"Tokyo Sunrise"	PJ Bianco; LP	4:24
5.	"Salvation"	Josh Alexander; LP; Billy Steinberg	3:49
6.	"Your Town"	Claude Kelly; LP; Justyn Pilbrow	4:25
7.	"Free to Love"	Kelly; LP; Pilbrow	4:26
8.	"Levitator"	LP; Marc Nelkin; Carl Ryden	3:53
9.	"Someday"	LP; Isabella Summers	4:10
10.	"Savannah"	Alexander; LP; Steinberg	3:12
11.	"Into the Wild"	Bianco; LP	3:54
12.	"Forever for Now"	LP; Summers	4:10
13.	"Road to Ruin (Japan Bonus Track)"	LP; Summers	4:45

== Videoclip ==
1. Tokyo Sunrise 2.

== Personnel ==
Credits adapted from AllMusic.

Musicians

- LP – lead vocals, ukulele
- Kid Harpoon – ukulele
- Rob Cavallo – guitar
- Yogi Lonich – guitar
- Tim Pierce – guitar
- Justyn Pilbrow – bass, guitar
- Mike Elizondo – bass
- Chris Chaney – bass, drums
- Oliver Charles – drums, percussion
- Gary Novak – drums, percussion
- Luis Conte – percussion
- Isabella Summers – keyboards, piano, synthesizer, percussion
- Jamie Muhoberac – keyboards
- Charlie Bisharat – violin
- Caroline Campbell – violin
- Vanessa Freebairn-Smith – cello
- Dane Little – cello
- David Campbell – string arrangements, string conductor
- Oliver Langford – string arrangements

Technical personnel

- Rob Cavallo – production, additional production, A&R
- Josh Alexander – production, vocal production
- Mike Del Rio – production, programming
- PJ Bianco – production, programming
- Tim Pagnotta – production
- Justyn Pilbrow – production
- Isabella Summers – production
- David Bassett – additional production
- Claude Kelly – vocal production
- Cheryl Jenets – production manager
- Jon Chen – production assistant
- Michelle Rogel – production assistant
- Dan Chase – engineering, programming
- Doug McKean – engineering, programming
- Allen Casillas – engineering
- Chris Mullings – engineering
- Wesley Seidman – engineering, assistant engineering
- Brendan Dekora – assistant engineering
- Rouble Kapoor – assistant engineering
- Jeremy Miller – assistant engineering
- Scott Moore – assistant engineering
- Tom Rasulo – assistant engineering
- Ryan Reault – assistant engineering
- Lance Sumner – assistant engineering
- Russ Waugh – assistant engineering
- Serban Ghenea – mixing
- John Hanes – mixing
- Chris Lord-Alge – mixing
- Andrew Schubert – mixing
- Brad Townsend – mixing
- Keith Armstrong – mixing assistant
- Nik Karpen – mixing assistant
- Bob Ludwig – mastering
- Mike Fasano – drum technician
- Jerry Johnson – drum technician
- Mauro Rubbi – drum technician
- Jeff Fenster – A&R
- Lars Fox – Pro-Tools
- Norman Wonderly – creative director
- Amanda Demme – photography
- Donny Phillips – design

== Charts ==
Chart (2014–2017)	Peak position
Belgian Albums (Ultratop Wallonia)	73
Latvian Albums (LaIPA)	66
US Billboard 200	132

== Release history ==
Region	Date	Format	Label
Poland	June 2, 2014	CD	Warner Music
United States	June 3, 2014	CD, digital download, LP	Warner Bros.
