= Ryan Cassata =

American musician, public speaker, writer, filmmaker and actor (born 1993)

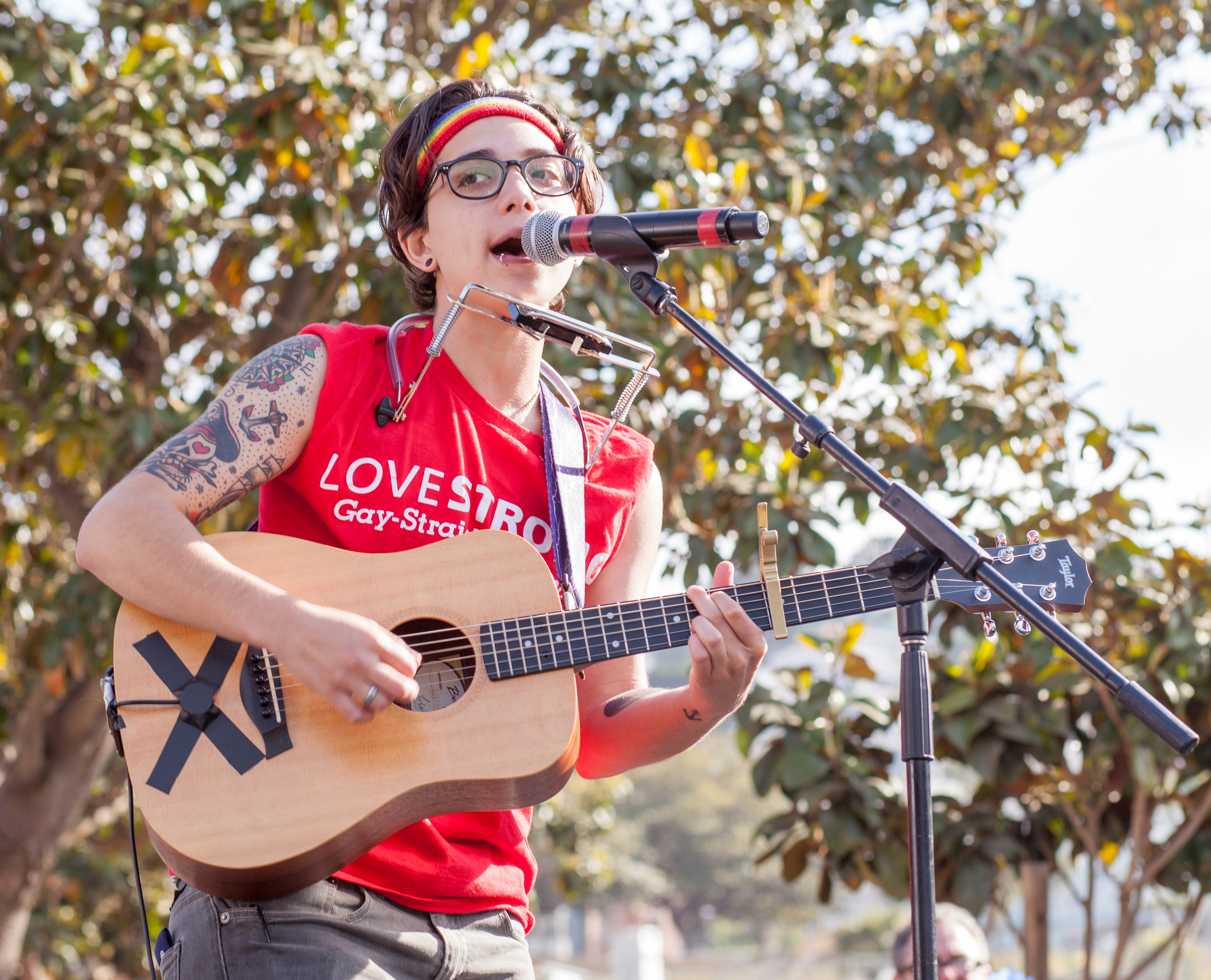
- Cassata performs at San Francisco Trans March 2015

Background information
- Born: December 13, 1993 (age 32); Stony Brook, New York, U.S.
- Origin: Bay Shore, New York, U.S.
- Genres: Folk rock, indie, alternative
- Occupations: Singer-songwriter, public speaker, LGBT activist, actor
- Instruments: Vocals, Guitar, Harmonica, Piano, Keyboard, Ukulele, Bass, Drums
- Years active: 2007 – present
- Label: Kill Rock Stars
- Spouse: Stephen Meeneghan (m. 2023)
- Members: Loren Barnese (bass); Kyle Dombroski (drums); Stephen Spies (violin, guitar, vocals)
- Past members: Jordi Felice (guitar, vocals); Kenny Truhn (drums, vocals); Wes Spaulding (bass)
- Website: ryancassata.com

Ryan Otto Cassata (born December 13, 1993) is an American musician, public speaker, writer, filmmaker, and actor. Cassata speaks at high schools and universities on the subject of gender dysphoria, being transgender, bullying and his personal transition from female to male, including top surgery in January 2012, when he was 18 years old. He has made appearances on Larry King Live and The Tyra Banks Show to talk about being transgender. He has performed at LGBT music festivals and has gone on tours across the United States of America. Cassata has performed at popular music venues such as Jazz at Lincoln Center, Whisky a Go Go, The Saint, The Bitter End, SideWalk Cafe, Turf Club (venue) and Bowery Poetry Club. Cassata won a date on Warped Tour 2013 through the Ernie Ball Battle of the Bands online competition and performed on the Acoustic Basement Stage on June 21, 2013, becoming the first openly transgender performer to play at the Vans Warped Tour. Cassata also won a date on Warped Tour 2015 through the Ernie Ball Battle of the Bands and performed on the Ernie Ball Stage on June 20, 2015.

Cassata composed the soundtrack for the 2010 short film "Loop Planes" which screened at various film festivals including the Tribeca Film Festival, South by Southwest Gay & Lesbian Film Festival, and Hamptons International Film Festival. "Distraction" and "Sleeping Through" from Cassata's 2011 EP "Distraction" make up the soundtrack. Cassata is the main subject of the full feature Danish produced documentary Songs for Alexis. Songs for Alexis, produced by Copenhagen Bombay with help from the Danish Film Institute, had its world premiere at Hot Docs Canadian International Documentary Festival to a sold-out crowd on April 30, 2014. Songs for Alexis had its United States premiere at Frameline Film Festival on June 28, 2014. Songs for Alexis also screened and sold out at DOC NYC. Indiewire listed Songs for Alexis on its "10 Films You must Watch at Frameline 2014" article.

== Activism ==
Since 2007, Ryan Cassata has presented at high schools, universities, support groups and conferences on topics such as coming out, gender dysphoria, being transgender, sex reassignment surgery, and bullying. Cassata also speaks about his experience as the first openly transgender student in Bay Shore High School and the changes he made there. Cassata talks about the petitions he made in Bay Shore High School to advocate for the rights of transgender students. He has discussed bullying, what gendered bathroom to use, and gaining the right to have his chosen name in the school yearbook instead of his name at birth. Cassata tells personal stories using speech, original songs and poetry and his own YouTube videos.

In 2012, Cassata became the youngest keynote speaker that the Philadelphia Trans-Health Conference ever elected. Ryan Cassata uses his music videos to discuss social justice topics such as bullying. His 2012 music video, "Hands of Hate" released on YouTube honors and remembers LGBT Youth who were murdered or committed suicide. He donated a portion of the proceeds to The Trevor Project. The lyrics of "Hands of Hate" discuss the murder of Matthew Shepard, the murder of Larry King, and the suicides of Tyler Clementi and Jamey Rodemeyer. Larry King is honored in the second verse:

And Lawrence King never saw ninth grade,
Before that bullet was forced into his brain,
By a bully, a madman, A classmate of rage.
Just at fifteen, young Larry was sent to his grave.

Ryan Cassata raised money with the Frank Cassata Family Foundation and Underworks in 2014 to provide over 400 transgender youth with new chest binders.

In 2015, Ryan Cassata appeared on the San Francisco Trans March line-up with Laverne Cox.

Ryan Cassata has spent time in Hot Springs, Arkansas and Little Rock, Arkansas educating the town through public speeches about the transgender community and screenings of Songs for Alexis. He also performed concerts at festivals and venues around the state.

Cassata has delivered speeches and performances at colleges and universities such as Harvard University, Kent State University, Carnegie Mellon University, Boston University, University of Southern California, Capital University, Rider University, Rutgers University, Central Washington University, San Francisco State University, Binghamton University, Dominican University of California, University of New Hampshire, State University of New York at Purchase, State University of New York at New Paltz, Ursinus College, State University of New York at Old Westbury, Farmingdale State College, St. Joseph's University, William Paterson University, Dowling College and Mount St. Joseph University.

Cassata has delivered speeches and performances at high schools such as Bay Shore High School, David H. Hickman High School, Rumson-Fair Haven Regional High School, Amityville Memorial High School, Ossining High School, Kingston High School, Monmouth Regional High School, Strong Vincent Middle School, Rancho Cotate High School, Freedom High School (Oakley, California) and Dougherty Valley High School.

Bustle put Cassata on the "7 Young Trans* Activists You Should Know About This Year" list in 2016 saying "he's also become one of the most prominent young trans* activist speakers in America."

Cassata has appeared on Larry King Live, The Tyra Banks Show and local television to speak about being transgender. He also appeared on CNN live to advocate for gender neutral bathrooms.

== Music career ==
Ryan Cassata's song "Soda Cans" was listed in the 2014 article by The Advocate as a 'Trans Anthem.' Cassata was listed on Logo TV's list of "9 Trans Musicians You Need to Get Into."' Cassata and his song "We're The Cool Kids" were listed on the 2017 Billboard list of 11 Transgender and Non-Binary Musicians You Need to Know.

Cassata is the first openly transgender musician to perform at Warped Tour after winning the Ernie Ball Battle of The Bands contest in 2013 and 2015.

Cassata's music video for his song "Other Friends" was featured in Billboard Magazine in 2019 with an in-depth interview and was featured on the front page of the website. The song "Daughter" was featured again in Billboard's "50 Stellar Songs by LGBTQ Artists That You Might Have Missed in 2018 (But Shouldn't Have)." Cassata and his song "Daughter" were also featured in Paper Magnifiine's article titled "50 LGBTQ Musicians You Should Prioritize" in 2018.

Cassata is one of two of the 2019 recipients of The ASCAP Foundation "Sunlight of the Spirit" Award which is presented to an individual who is exemplary in recovery and in music creativity for his original song "Jupiter." Ryan Cassata performed at The ASCAP Foundation Honors 2019 at Jazz at Lincoln Center and accepted his award.

== YouTube ==
Cassata began creating vlogs and uploading footage from his concerts in 2007. Cassata posts videos on his personal YouTube channel, Ryan Cassata talking about his experience as a transgender man, a musician, and a public speaker. As of December 2019 his channel has over 100 thousand subscribers, and his videos have been viewed over 10 million times. Ryan Cassata has collaborated on videos with Davey Wavey, Aydian Dowling, ElloSteph, and Stevie Boebi. Cassata became the first transgender person on the LGBT Panel at Playlist Live in February 2015 and appeared with Stevie Boebi, ElloSteph, Marissa Farina, RJ Aguiar, and Tyler Oakley.

Cassata was a regular member on the collaboration YouTube channel LGBTeens a channel that has over 35,000 subscribers and was part of the Big Frame network. Cassata vlogged about the LGBT community and his personal experience as an openly LGBT teen on this channel.

He has been rated as one of the "top 5 most influential transgender YouTube creators" by NewMediaRockstars.

== Acting ==
In June 2015, Ryan Cassata was cast as a lead character in Beemus directed by Lauren Wolkstein. Cassata played a high school gym student. Cassata won the award for "Best Breakout Performance" at the Victoria TX Independent Film Fest in March 2016. Cassata appeared in a Bonobos (apparel) national commercial titled "However You Fit" in 2018 which featured 172 men wearing the same style of pants.

== Notable awards & honors ==
- Harvey Milk Memorial Award
- Ernie Ball Battle of The Bands winner, featured on Warped Tour 2013
- Ernie Ball Battle of The Bands winner, featured on Warped Tour 2015
- KPQR, 99.1 FM Music Community Member of the Year Award
- Best Breakout Performance for "Beemus, It'll End In Tears" at Victoria TX Independent Film Festival
- Best Music Short for "Daughter" at New Renaissance Film Festival, Amsterdam 2019
- Certificate of Congressional Recognition, California's 36th congressional district, 2019
- Proclamation, City of Palm Springs, CA - Recognized for Transgender Activism, 2019
- Proclamation, City of Rancho Mirage, CA - Recognized for Transgender Activism, 2019
- Proclamation, Cathedral City, CA - Recognized for Transgender Activism, 2019
- Proclamation, City of Palm Desert, CA - Recognized for Transgender Activism, 2019
- Proclamation, City of La Quinta - Recognized for Transgender Activism, 2019
- The ASCAP Foundation "Sunlight of the Spirit" Award, 2019
- 2019 - International Songwriting Competition Finalist, for his song "Daughter"
- 2019 - International Songwriting Competition Honorable Mention, for his song "Daughter"
- 2020 - Global Music Awards Silver Medal Winner, for his song "Daughter"
- 2020 - Americana Highways: Readers' Favorite Top Ten Albums of March 2020 for "The Witches Made Me Do It"
- 2020 - "Best Music Video" Award Winner for The Film Contest, February 2020, for his song "Daughter"
- 2020 - Unsigned Only Semi-Finalist for his song Catcher in the Rye
- 2020 - "Best Music Video" Award Winner for the East Village LGBTQ Film Festival for his song "Catcher in the Rye"
- 2020 - Global Independent Film Awards - Gold Medal Winner - Best LGBTQ Director for "Daughter"
- 2020 - Global Independent Film Awards - Silver Medal Winner - Best Original Song "Daughter"
- 2020 - Global Independent Film Awards - Bronze Medal Winner - Best LGBTQ Film for "Daughter"
- 2020 - Global Independent Film Awards - Bronze Medal Winner - Best Music Video for "Daughter"
- 2022 - Best Music Video Award for "We March" at Louisiana Rainbow: LGBT+ Film Festival
- 2022 - ASCAP Harold Adamson Workshop Selectee
- 2022 - ASCAP Panelist for Roundtable on Identity in Music
- 2022 - Best Soundtrack Award for "You & Me Babe" in Two Eyes at FilmOut San Diego Film Festival
- 2023 - Glover Songwriting Award Winner for Hold On, You Belong (People Like Us)
- 2023 - Master of Arts in Social Transformation from Pacific School of Religion (3.95 GPA)
- 2023 - Marcella Althaus-Reid Award Winner, Pacific School of Religion
- 2023 - Taped Conversation with Admiral Rachel Levine, MD
- 2024 - Invitation to the White House for White House Pride 2024
- 2024 - Certificate of Recognition from County of Los Angeles for LGBTQ Activism for Foster Youth
- 2024 - Certificate of Recognition from The City of Long Beach for Trans Pride Festival
- 2025 - GRAMMY NEXT Class 2025 Selectee
- 2025 - Long Island Pride - Grand Marshal

== Discography ==
=== LPs ===
The Theme of Humankind (Artemendous Records, May 28, 2011) Track Listing:

1. "Val's Song"
2. "Dancing Shoes"
3. "Love 'Round the World"
4. "Waiting On the Sunrise"
5. "In The Business"
6. "Artemendous Knows All"
7. "Wild Fire Woman"
8. "The Trans Slam"
9. "Going West"
10. "Love/Hate"
11. "In My Hands"

Musicians:

- Ryan Cassata – Composer, Vocals, Acoustic Guitar, Electric Guitar, Harmonica, Keyboard
- Kenny Truhn – Electric Guitar, Drums, Percussion
- Steven Battline – Keyboards, Drums, Electric Guitar
- Dave Suchmann – Bass Guitar
- Josh Seidman – Electric Guitar, Percussion

Production:

- Ryan Cassata – Executive Producer
- Dave Suchmann – Co-producer
- Mic Angelo – Mix Engineer
- Emily Gage – Album Artwork

The Rhythm (ROC Productions, May 25, 2012) Track Listing:

1. "Love 'round the World (Hope)"
2. "The Rhythm" (feat. Kenny Truhn)
3. "Mouth Like a Hurricane"
4. "Soda Cans"
5. "Nothing Like Plastic"
6. "Intro (I Do)"
7. "Beauty Like Youth (I Do)" (feat. Alexis Ann)
8. "Shine Your Light"
9. "Hands of Hate" (feat. Kenny Truhn, Vincent Cassata, Francine Cassata)

Musicians:

- Ryan Cassata – Vocals, Acoustic Guitar, Electric Guitar, Keyboard
- Kenny Truhn – Electric Guitar, Drums, Bass, Percussion
- Adam Abresch – Trumpet
- Josh Seidman – Percussion

Production:

- Ryan Cassata – Composer, Executive Producer, Liner Notes
- Kenny Truhn – Co-producer
- Mic Angelo – Mix Engineer
- Erich Glaubitz – Mastering
- Emily Gage – Album Artwork

Songs for Alexis (Original Soundtrack Recording) (ROC Productions, April 30, 2014) Track Listing:

1. Oh, Alexis
2. Day Dream
3. New York to California
4. Soda Cans
5. Naked (Protest Song)
6. The Rhythm
7. Together Again
8. Freedom Nation
9. Mayday
10. Hands of Hate (feat. Kenny Truhn, Vincent Cassata, Francine Cassata)

Soul Sounds (ROC Productions, February 21, 2015) Track Listing:

1. Since When Does Bare Feet Make You A Warrior Of Peace?
2. Psychedelic Alligator Hunter
3. Cocaine Crazy
4. Jump Fence
5. Alone
6. Recover Me
7. Save My Soul
8. Mr. Beane (Fenway Park)
9. Face On The Ground
10. Red Light

Musicians:

- Ryan Cassata – Vocals, Acoustic Guitar, Electric Guitar, Keyboard
- Kenny Truhn – Electric Guitar, Drums, Bass, Percussion
- Adam Abresch – Trumpet
- Kenny Truhn, Jordanna Felice, Jess Gorman - Backing Vocals
- Mark O'Connell of Taking Back Sunday - Additional Drums on Track 1

Production:

- Ryan Cassata – Composer, Executive Producer, Liner Notes
- Kenny Truhn – Co-producer
- Mic Angelo – Mix Engineer
- Mike Cervantes from Masterdisk – Mastering
- Kristen Lyseggen, Emily Gage – Photograph, Album Artwork

Shine (ROC Productions, March 15, 2016) Track Listing:

1. We're The Cool Kids
2. Check Engine
3. Bedroom Eyes
4. Sunrise Highway
5. Don't Count Me Out
6. Man In The Mirror
7. Shine On
8. Alcatraz
9. Hot Springs, Arkansas
10. Round Here

Musicians:

- Ryan Cassata – Composer, Vocals, Acoustic Guitar, Electric Guitar, Keyboard, Piano
- Kenny Truhn - Drums
- Barb Morrison - Electric Guitar, Percussion, Bass, Electric Guitars, Horns
- Jonathan Jetter - Slide Guitars, Electric Guitars, Mandolin
- Rebecca Pritchard - Backing Vocals
- Francine Cassata - Backing Vocals

Production:

- Ryan Cassata – Composer, Liner Notes
- Barb Morrison - Producer
- Jonathan Jetter – Engineer
- John Davis – Mastering
- Adam Bouska - Photography
- Emily Gage – Album Artwork

The Witches Made Me Do It (ROC Productions, March 27, 2020)

Track Listing:

1. Bamboo Plants
2. Extended Vacation
3. Catcher in the Rye
4. The Witches Made Me Do It
5. Never Lied
6. Holy Holy Hold Me
7. Disguise
8. We're Still Living

Musicians:

- Ryan Cassata – Vocals, Acoustic Guitar, Electric Guitar, Piano
- Stephen Spies - Violin, Viola, Electric Guitar, Piano, Additional Production
- Kyle Dombroski - Drums, Percussion, Additional Production
- Rory Snively - Bass

Production:

- Ryan Cassata – Composer, Liner Notes
- Jeni Mckenna - Composer
- Jason Hiller, Ryan Cassata - Producer
- Jason Hiller - Mix/Master Engineer
- Ryan Cassata - Photography
- Emiko Lytell – Album Artwork

Magic Miracle Mile (ROC Productions, October, 22nd, 2021)

Track Listing:

1. Interlude
2. Guard Rail
3. Starfucker$
4. Coffin
5. Loner Boy
6. Mattress
7. Hometown HEro
8. Magic Miracle Mile
9. Ghosts R Gone
10. Ok, On The Record
11. Broken Heart (Transcend) [w Itsokaylove]
12. Hollyweird
13. C'mon Sarah, It's Great to be 8
14. Golden Hour

Musicians:

- Ryan Cassata – Vocals, Acoustic Guitar, Electric Guitar, Piano, Keyboards, Drums, Bass Production, Mixing
- Stephen Spies - Violin, Viola, Electric Guitar, Piano, Vocals, Additional Production
- Kenny Truhn - Additional Drums
- Lorene Barnese - Additional Bass
- Jason Hiller - Additional Bass, Mixing, Mastering

Production:

- Ryan Cassata – Composer, Producer, Mixer Liner Notes
- Jason Hiller, Co-producer
- Jason Hiller - Co-Mix/Master Engineer
- Asher Phoenix - Photography
- Emiko Lytell – Album Artwork

Greetings from Echo Park (Kill Rock Stars, June 6, 2025)

Track Listing:

1. i feel like throwing up
2. a Knack for Overthinking
3. if you ever leave long island
4. Scriptures, Scripts, & Bottles
5. My Body's My Home
6. He's My Man
7. r u safe?
8. If You're Not Dead Yet, Will You Be My Friend?
9. Bad Things
10. Wants & Needs
11. QUEER American DREAM
12. HOWL (Protest Song)
13. Queer Love Outlaw
14. Halfway House

=== EPs ===
Distraction (January 12, 2011) Track Listing:

1. "Distraction"
2. "Sleeping Through"
3. "Wonderful, Beautiful"
4. "The Desert King"
5. "Sparkle Like the Sea"
6. "Val's Song"

Musicians:

- Ryan Cassata – Vocals, Acoustic Guitar, Electric Guitar, Harmonica, Keyboard, Percussion
- David DeFeis – Keyboards, Bass Guitar, Drums, Percussion

Production:

- Ryan Cassata – Executive Producer, Liner Notes
- David DeFeis – Co-producer, Mix Engineer, Mastering
- Emily Gage – Album Artwork

Oh, Alexis: Acoustic Sessions, Vol. 1 (ROC Productions, December 13, 2012)

Track Listing:

1. "Oh, Alexis"
2. "Soda Cans"
3. "1,000 Letters"
4. "Mayday"
5. "Together Again"
6. "New York to California"
7. "Day Dream"

Production:

- Ryan Cassata – Executive Producer
- Erich Glaubitz – Mix Engineer, Mastering, Producer
- Emily Gage – Album Artwork

In America: The Acoustic Sessions, Vol. 2 (ROC Productions, April 13, 2013)

Track Listing:

1. "The Coffee Shop Song"
2. "Freedom Nation"
3. "1960's Scene"
4. "The Rhythm"
5. "In America"

Production:

- Ryan Cassata – Executive Producer, Album Artwork
- Erich Glaubitz – Mix Engineer, Mastering, Producer

Jupiter, It Won't Be Long: The Acoustic Sessions, Vol. 3 (ROC Productions, September 13, 2013) Track Listing:

1. "I Don't Really Wanna Go to College"
2. "Liberation"
3. "Jupiter, It Won't Be Long"
4. "Dear Lucas"
5. "Tell His Old Man"
6. "The Mob's Rolling Cadillac"
7. "Sobering Up"
8. "Grass Hat"

Production:

- Ryan Cassata – Executive Producer
- Erich Glaubitz – Mix Engineer, Mastering, Producer
- Emily Gage – Album Artwork

Chicago Midway: The Acoustic Sessions, Vol. 4 (ROC Productions, April 13, 2014) Track Listing:

1. Long Shot
2. Chicago Midway
3. Cracks & Crevices
4. Shotgun of a Mouth
5. Cocaine Crazy
6. Sacred Grounds
7. Love Defined

Production:

- Ryan Cassata – Executive Producer, Album Artwork
- Erich Glaubitz – Mix Engineer, Mastering, Producer
- Sam Tall – Album Artwork

Virginia, Pick Up The Phone (ROC Productions, July 7, 2017) Track Listing:

1. Oh, Girl
2. The Race
3. Pretty As She Falls
4. Virginia Pick Up The Phone
5. Just A Kid
6. Alcatraz

Production:

- Ryan Cassata – Executive Producer, Guitar, Harmonica, Vocals
- Steve K – Producer
- Mic Angelo - Mix Engineer, Mastering
- Emily Gage – Album Artwork

=== Singles ===
Captain May (May 2014)

Musicians:

- Ryan Cassata – Vocals, Acoustic Guitar, Keyboard
- Sam Tall – Electric Guitar, Bass Guitar, Drums, Percussion

Production:

- Ryan Cassata – Producer
- Sam Tall – Producer, Mix Engineer, Mastering, Post Production

Look At The World (January 2016)

Musicians: Jon Jeremy, Tormented, Ryan Cassata

Light Up (August 2017)

Musicians:

- Ryan Cassata – Vocals, Acoustic Guitar,
- Destroy – Drums, Percussion
- Acadia – Bass Guitar, Vocals
- Jordanna Felice - Electric Guitar, Vocals

Production:

- Ryan Cassata – Co-producer
- Steve K – Co-producer
- Mic Angelo – Mix Engineer, Mastering
- Emily Gage – Album Artwork

Daughter (April 2018)

Musicians:

- Ryan Cassata – Vocals, Acoustic Guitar
- Nate Evans – Electric Guitar, Bass Guitar, Drums, Percussion

Production:

- Nate Evans – Producer, Mix Engineer, Mastering
- Ryan Cassata – Co-producer

It's Christmastime (December 2018)

Musicians & Production:

- Ryan Cassata – Vocals, Electric Guitar
- Kyle Dombroski - Drums, Percussion
- Stephen Spies - Vocals, Electric Guitar
- Rebecca Bacich - Viola
- Rory Snively - Bass

Jupiter (March 2019)

Musicians:

- Ryan Cassata – Vocals, Acoustic Guitar
- Nate Evans – Electric Guitar, Bass Guitar, Drums, Percussion

Production:

- Nate Evans – Producer, Mix Engineer, Mastering
- Ryan Cassata – Co-producer

Back Down South (May 2019)

Musicians:

- Ryan Cassata – Vocals, Acoustic Guitar
- Nate Evans – Electric Guitar, Bass Guitar, Drums, Percussion

Production:

- Nate Evans – Producer, Mix Engineer, Mastering
- Ryan Cassata – Co-producer

== Filmography ==
Year	Title	Role	Notes
2010	Loop Planes	Composer of the soundtrack	
2013	Gender Silent	Himself	
2014	Songs for Alexis	Himself, Composer of the Soundtrack	Released at Hot Docs International Documentary Festival in Toronto and Frameline Film Festival
2014	On The Road: Ryan Cassata 2014 Tour Documentary	Himself, Composer of the Soundtrack	DVD Only
2015	Beemus, It'll End In Tears	The Student	premiered at South by Southwest
2015	Flesh Trade	Cooper	post-production
2018	Before We Fall	Composer of the credits soundtrack	
2018	Must've Been	Teenage Boy	Chromeo ft. DRAM
2018	Bonobos: Evolve the Definition	Himself	#EvolveTheDefinition is a project Bonobos started to build a conversation around the definition of "masculine."
2020	Two Eyes	Jalin	post-production
2020	No Ordinary Man (film)	Himself	Nominated for GLAAD Media Award
2021	Birthday Boy	Soundtrack Addition: ‘Daughter’ Written & Performed by Ryan Cassata	Originally a kick starter project, Birthday Boy is directed by Leo Lebeau and currently in post-production.
2025	Peter	Peter	Short Horror Film, Directed by David Anderson

== Television ==
Year	Title	Role	Notes
2009	Larry King Live	Himself	TV series; Episode: "Born in the Wrong Body!"
2010	The Tyra Banks Show	Himself	TV series; Episode: "We're 7 & 8 Years Old and Know We Are Transgender"
2012	The Jason Galka Show	Himself	TV series; Episode: "Ryan Cassata"
2012	The Jason Galka Show	Himself	TV series; Episode: "Ryan Cassata Returns"
2013	Head First	Himself	TV series; Episode: "The Wrong Body"
2013	HuffPost Live	Himself	TV series; Episode: "The Life Of A Transgender Teenager"
2013	HuffPost Live	Himself	TV series; Episode: "The Fight For Transgender Teen Rights"
2016	CNN	Himself	News; "Young People Talk About New Guidelines"
2018	Turnt	Kai	Facebook Web Series, Episodes 1.24, 1.39, 1.40
2018	1 In 8 Is 1 Too Many	Himself	PSA Commercial for Lifetime Network
2018	Thank You Come Again	Composer of Soundtrack Credits	TV Web Series
2018	Bad Ally	Composer of Soundtrack, Ep 6	TV Web Series

== Theater credits ==
Readings & Workshops

- Albert Cashier as Young Albert (2017)
- This Ain't No Disco! as Ensemble (2017)
- Cotton Candy and Cocaine as Blazer (2017)

== Publications ==
Ryan Cassata currently writes for Rock The Pigeon Music Blog.

Year	Publication	Title
2014	IndieWire	"Ryan Cassata, The Trans Teen From New Doc 'Songs For Alexis,' Shares His Experiences Making The Film and Bringing It To Hot Docs"
2015	The New York Times	"Ryan Cassata"
2015	The VOV Zine	"Carl Beane"
2016	Original Plumbing	Original Plumbing Magazine #17, The Tattoo Issue, Chapter: "Home"
2016	Film In Revolt	"Almost Famous"
2016	Heart Journal	"Dear Dad"
2017	HuffPost	"My Bathroom Struggle As A Transgender Student"
2017	HuffPost	"Being Publicly Misgendered Doesn’t Bother Me"
2017	HuffPost	"Passing As Cisgender Can Sometimes Mean Life Or Death"
2017	HuffPost	"Respecting They/Them Pronouns"
2017	HuffPost	"Consent as emPWRment"
2017	HuffPost	"Transgender Veteran: ‘You Cannot Silence Us.’"
2017	HuffPost	"Trans Actors For Trans Characters"
2018	FTM Magazine, Trans Men Magazine	May 2018, Issue 12, Chapter: "Flying High In The City of Angels"
2018	The Advocate	"Banning Conversion Therapy Will Save Lives"
2018	Indie Music Bus	"How To Book Your Own Tours DIY"
2018	FTM Magazine, Trans Men Magazine	June 2018, Issue 13, Chapter: "To Our Trans Masc Founding Fathers"
2018	Indie Music Bus	"Why Proper Show Etiquette Can Pay Off"
2018	Indie Music Bus	"TOUR HACKS: A Nervous & Prepared Musicians Guide"
2019	Medium - Matthew's Place	"Figuring Out My Identity Was Like Trying On New Clothes"
2019	Medium - Matthew's Place	"The Trans Guys Who Made the Path Easier to Walk"
2019	Indie Music Bus	"Can You Be Creative As A Songwriter If You Are Sober?"
2019	Medium - Matthew's Place	"Powering Through & Destroying Closet Doors"
2019	Medium - Matthew's Place	"Major Brands & Their Pride"
2019	Medium - Matthew's Place	"Sober at Pride"
2019	Medium - Matthew's Place	"The Healing Powers of Music"

== Bibliography ==
=== Contributions ===
- 2014 – Trans Bodies, Trans Selves: A Resource for the Transgender Community – Laura Erickson-Schroth (ISBN 978-0199325351) (Youth Chapter, advisor)
- 2016 – The i’Mpossible Project – Joshua Riverdal (ISBN 978-0-9860964-7-1) (Learning to Love You)
- 2016 – The ABC's of LGBT+ – Ash Hardell (ISBN 978-1633534094) (Identities and Terms)
- 2019 – Original Plumbing: The Best of Ten Years of Trans Male Culture – Edited by Amos Mac and Rocco Kayiatos (ISBN 9781936932597) (Home)

== Music videos ==
Title	Year
"Sleeping Through"	2011
"Soda Cans"	2012
"Hands of Hate"	2012
"Mayday"	2013
"Bedroom Eyes (Demo)	2014
"Bedroom Eyes"	2016
"Check Engine"	2016
"Alcatraz"	2016
"We're The Cool Kids"	2016
"Don't Count Me Out"	2016
"Sinking, Falling"	2017
"Light Up"	2017
"Daughter"	2018
"It's Christmastime"	2018
"Back Down South"	2019
"Bamboo Plants"	2019
"Extended Vacation"	2020
"Catcher in the Rye"	2020
"Sober"	2020
"Gender Binary (F U)"	2020
"Love Thing"	2020
"Star****er$"	2021
"Loner Boy"	2021
"Hometown HEro"	2021
"OK, ON THE RECORD"	2021
"HOLD ON, YOU BELONG (People Like Us)"	2022
"WE MARCH (Stronger Together)"	2022
"EVERYTHING CHANGED"	2022
"if you ever leave long island"	2023
"HOWL (Protest Song)"	2023
"We don't f*** with cops"	2026
