= Barb Morrison =

American singer and songwriter

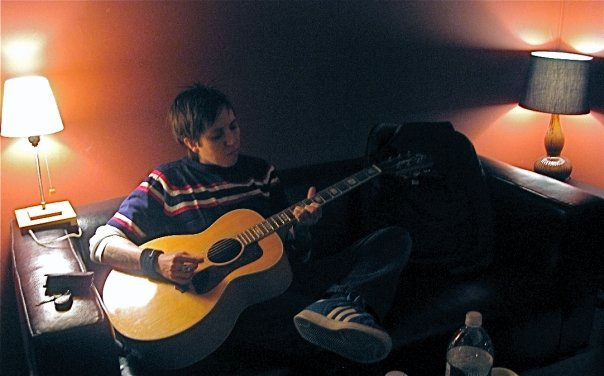

Background information
- Also known as: Buzz Morrison, 'Super Buddha'
- Born: May 22, 1967 (age 59); Schenectady, New York, US
- Occupations: Singer-songwriter, Record producer, Film Score Composer, Author
- Instruments: Vocals, saxophone, guitar, bass
- Years active: 1984–present
- Website: www.barbmorrisonmusic.com

Barb Morrison (born May 22, 1967) is an American recording artist, Top 5 Billboard dance chart songwriter, and Platinum record producer, best known as producer for numerous artists such as Blondie, Rufus Wainwright, Franz Ferdinand (band), LP, Asia Kate Dillon and as an ASCAP-featured film score composer.

== Early life and music ==
Barb Morrison, the child of James and Helen Morrison, was born May 22, 1967, in Schenectady, New York, and has two brothers, James Jr. and Shawn. After beginning piano at age 7 and saxophone at age 9, Barb joined their first punk band as a drummer at age 14. They bought their first guitar for $15.00 at the age of 17 and moved to New York City later that year to pursue a career in music.

== Career ==
In 1985, they played their first NYC show at CBGB and became a regular onstage at many East Village venues of the era such as Danceteria, The Ritz, Pyramid Club, and Limelight. While still a teenager Morrison was already playing sax with punk musicians Sylvain Sylvain, Johnny Thunders and Cherry Vanilla.

In 1987, they joined the band 'Gutterboy' as a saxophone player, guitarist and back up singer. 'Gutterboy', fronted by writer/director Dito Montiel, toured with Bryan Adams, The Jesus and Mary Chain, Stray Cats and Ramones. They were signed to Mercury Records in 1989, released "St. Stanislaus of E. 7th St." and modeled for photographer Bruce Weber's Gianni Versace catalog.

In 1992, they left Gutterboy to start the band "Itchy Trigger Finger" with longtime friend Harry Nagle. In Itchy Trigger Finger they toured on Lollapalooza along with Sonic Youth, Hole, Sinéad O'Connor, Cypress Hill, Moby, Beck, Mighty Mighty Bosstones, Coolio, yo la tengo, The Roots and Patti Smith. From 1995–1998, they were also the sax player and guitarist for the Squeeze box house band at Don Hill's, sharing that stage with Green Day, Deborah Harry, Joey Arias, Lady Bunny, John Cameron Mitchell, Nina Hagen, The Runaways, Justin Bond and Jayne County.

In 2000, Morrison scored their first film, The Safety of Objects starring Glenn Close. They also wrote a song titled "Kiss It All Goodbye" for the movie with LP, and later that year co-wrote and produced three songs, including the title track, for L.P.'s debut album Heart-Shaped Scar. That same year, Morrison also joined Antony and the Johnsons as a clarinet player and saxophonist. In 2001 Morrison began producing a number of bands who had contributed to the film's soundtrack. Morrison spent 2000–2006 co-producing and scoring films with teams such as Emboznik, 'Sonic & Buzz' and the Blizzard Twins. For a detailed film score discography see the Film Scores discography section.

From 2000–2012 Morrison made up half of the record production duo Super Buddha. In 2005, Morrison co-produced a remix of the song "In the Flesh" for Blondie's compilation album Greatest Hits, and also collaborated with Grammy Award winner Pink on the video for the song "Hello Bonjour". In 2006, Morrison co-wrote the Top 5 Billboard dance chart remix 'Two Times Blue: Debbie Harry vs. Soul Seekerz' and the song If I Had You, which was featured regularly on VH-1. In 2011, Morrison co-wrote three songs on Blondie's Panic of Girls album as well as contributing production to releases by Franz Ferdinand and Lily Allen.

In 2012, Morrison left Super Buddha to pursue a solo career. Their first endeavor was writing and producing three songs for Blondie: "Dead Air", "Bride of Infinity" and "Practice Makes Perfect", all of which were released as free downloads. That same year they composed the film score for the movie Concussion, starring Robin Weigert and Maggie Siff, an official selection of the 2013 Sundance Film Festival and winner of the Berlin Film Festival's Teddy Award Jury Prize. Also that year, Barb mixed the album Black Tie Elevator for The Cliks.

== 2013-present ==
Music that Morrison produced for Rayya Elias' book Harley Loco was presented by author Elizabeth Gilbert at the Detroit Institute of Arts, following the release of the book and accompanying soundtrack by Viking Press. 'Harley Loco' and Blue Microphones also released a mini-documentary about Barb's work as a music producer called Harley Loco & Blue Microphones Presents Barb Morrison.

In 2014, Morrison produced records for various artists including Rachael Sage, Miranda Di Perno, Princess Superstar, Carrie Ashley Hill and composed scores for the films Sidewalk Traffic, FAST and Ma/ddy. They also spoke on the "Gender Amplified" panel at Barnard College, and they were a featured film score composer on ASCAP's 2014 "Spotlight".

In 2015, Morrison produced records and film scores for various projects such as "Sugar" on PBS, as well as performed at the Carlyle with Debbie Harry. They were also featured in a New York Times article about producing transgender artists.

In 2016, Morrison produced the album "Shine" by Ryan Cassata as well as "Take My Shoulder" by Venus DeMars and Laura Jane Grace.

In 2017, Morrison received their first Platinum Records for producing the song 'In the Flesh' for Blondie's album Sight & Sound. They also produced Gina Volpe's (founding member of the punk band Lunachicks) solo album "Different Animal".

In 2018, Morrison composed the score for the documentary "Cherry Grove Stories" and also produced the debut EP by Asia Kate Dillon 'Handsome Hands'.

In 2019, Morrison produced the second solo record by Gina Volpe, which Rolling Stone magazine called "modern angst via detuned metal guitars and rattling 808 beats".

From 2020 - 2023, Morrison produced the debut album by Tripping Jupiter featuring bass by Gail Ann Dorsey and baritone horn by Elizabeth Gilbert. The award winning film for the song "Lipstick of the Brave" was animated by Bill Plympton. Morrison also produced the debut EP by Katrina Weidman as well as the song "Grab Em" by Sherry Vine.

Morrison also appears on Season Three of Show Us Your Junk, a show about music producers and their studios.

Morrison is endorsed by Sugar Bytes, DrumCore, Earthquaker Devices, D'Angelico Guitars and Gibson Guitars.

== Author ==
In June 2023 Morrison released the memoir Bottoming For God, with author endorsements from Elizabeth Gilbert, Dito Montiel and Debbie Harry.

== Personal life ==
Morrison identifies as non binary and lives in Frenchtown, New Jersey and Los Angeles with their wife Jaime Karpovich.

== Discography ==
=== Albums ===
- Gutterboy, Geffen Records. (1989, 1992) (Saxophone, vocals)
- Gutterboy, St. Stanislaus of East Seventh, Mercury Records. (1991) (Saxophone, Vocals, Guitar)
- Antony and the Johnsons: Immortal Bird / Cripple and the Starfish, Durtro. (2000) (Clarinet, Saxophone)
- LP (singer): Heart-Shaped Scar Koch Records (2001) (Producer, Songwriter)
- Rufus Wainwright: Wig in a Box, Off Records. (2003) (Producer)
- Blondie: Greatest Hits: Sight & Sound, EMI. (2005) (Producer)
- Scissor Sisters: Filthy/Gorgeous (ATOC vs. Superbuddha remix), A Touch of Class. (2005) (Remixer)
- Deborah Harry: Necessary Evil, Eleven Seven. (2007) (Producer, Songwriter)
- Franz Ferdinand (band): Covers (Franz Ferdinand EP), Domino Recording Company (2011) (Producer)
- Blondie: Panic of Girls, Eleven Seven/EMI. (2011) (Songwriter)
- The Cliks: Black Tie Elevator. (2013) (Mixer)
- Ryan Cassata: Shine. (2016) (Producer)
- Gina Volpe: Different Animal (2017) (Producer)
- Gina Volpe: Winter to Spring Singles (2019) (Producer)
- Asia Kate Dillon: Handsome Hands (2020) (Producer)

=== Film scores ===
- The Coolest Year in Hell- Scored this 2007 Emmy-nominated documentary for VH-1. (Credited as Emboznik)
- Joan of Arcadia- Source music for episode #114 of this CBS primetime series' 2004 season. (Credited as Sean Demis & Buzz Morrison)
- 'Til Death Do Us Part: Carmen and Dave- Sound chip for promotional ad, Cannes Film Festival 2004 for MTV Networks and International Agency: Kidvertisers. (Credited as Barb Morrison)
- The safety of objects- Full score, all source music, incidentals and trailer for this feature film starring Glenn Close, Dermot Mulroney, Patricia Clarkson, Joshua Jackson and directed by Rose Troche. Released in March 2003. (Credited as Emboznik, Bullet, Super Buddha, Itchy Trigger Finger)
- Rosa negra 2: Como corre el amor- Score (2004) (Credited as Emboznik, Blizzard Twins, Sonic & Buzz)
- The l word – Full musical score for the creation of the pilot of this Showtime original series starring Jennifer Beals and Pam Grier. Directed by Rose Troche. (Credited as Emboznik)
- Raising Victor Vargas – Hip hop source cue for this feature film directed by Peter Sollett. Sundance Film Festival choice award, one of IFC's 'Top 10 to Watch For in 2003.' Released March 30, 2003. (Credited as Sonic & Buzz)
- Choices: The Good, the Bad and the Ugly- Full musical score of this short film directed by Tamara Jenkins (writer/director, Slums of Beverly Hills) and Scenarios USA. Released on Showtime in December 2003. (Credited as Sonic & Buzz)
- G- Hip Hop source cue. A feature film by Andrew Lauren, starring Blair Underwood (Sex & the City) and released in September 2004 (Credited as Sonic & Buzz)
- A-List- Full musical score for this feature film directed by Shira Lee Shalit starring Sally Kirkland (Bruce Almighty), Daphne Zuniga (Melrose Place) and David Carradine. Release for spring 2005 (Credited as Emboznik & Sean Semis and Buzz Morrison)
- David Searching- Opening credits & source cue for this feature film starring Anthony Rapp (Rent). Directed by Leslie Smith, released in 1999. (Credited as Itchy Trigger Finger)
- Rufus Wainwright- Produced song 'The Origin of Love' for tribute CD for the movie Hedwig and the Angry Inch, released in September 2003. Featured in Rainlake Production's documentary of the making of 'Wig in a box' (Credited as Barb Morrison)
- Toothpaste (film) (Scenarios USA)- Full musical score for this short film directed by Ben Younger (Boiler Room), shot by Guillermo Navarro (Hellboy) and produced by Michael Waxman (Collateral). Released for Showtime Spring 2005 (Credited as Emboznik)
- The Buddy Baker ASCAP Film Scoring Workshop.- Composed for and conducted a 20-piece orchestra including members of the New York Philharmonic and Metropolitan Opera. Moderated by Mark Snow (The X-Files) and Marco Beltrami (Blade II and Terminator 3: Rise of the Machines). (Credited as Emboznik)
- Concussion – Full musical score for this feature film directed by Stacie Passon and produced by Rose Troche, starring Robin Weigert and Maggie Siff. (Credited as Barb Morrison)
- Elliot King is Third – Full musical score for this short film directed by Rose Troche and produced by Stacie Passon. (Credited as Barb Morrison)
- Sidewalk Traffic - Full musical score for this film directed by Anthony Fisher and starring Heather Matarazzo and Kurt Loder
- FAST - Full musical score for this short film directed by Melanie Vesey.
- Ma/ddy - Full musical score for this film directed by Devon Kirkpatrick starring Clea DuVall and Mel Shimkovitz
- Sugar - Full musical score and source music for this series on PBS, directed by Rose Troche
- Cherry Grove Stories - Full musical score and source music for the documentary directed by Michael Fisher
