= Lost on You (LP album) =

Studio album by LP
- Released: December 9, 2016
- Recorded: 2015–2016
- Length: 37:04
- Label: Vagrant

LP chronology
Death Valley (2016)	Lost on You (2016)	Heart to Mouth (2018)

Singles from Lost on You
- 1. "Muddy Waters" Released: September 25, 2015; 2. "Lost on You" Released: November 20, 2015; 3. "Other People" Released: November 11, 2016

Professional ratings
Review scores
Source	Rating
AllMusic	4/5 stars

Lost on You is the fourth studio album by American singer-songwriter LP. It was released on December 9, 2016, through Vagrant Records in Canada and several European countries.

== Track listing ==
Standard European version (2016)
No.	Title	Writer(s)	Length
1.	"Muddy Waters"	LP; Mike Del Rio; Joshua Record	3:48
2.	"No Witness"	LP; Del Rio; Ricky Luna	3:28
3.	"Lost on You"	LP; Nate Campany; Del Rio	4:28
4.	"Up Against Me"	LP; PJ Bianco	3:02
5.	"Tightrope"	LP; Del Rio; Nikolai Potthoff	3:38
6.	"Other People"	LP; Ben Romans; Campany	4:04
7.	"Into the Wild"	LP; Bianco	3:39
8.	"Strange"	LP; Del Rio; Campany	3:54
9.	"Death Valley"	LP; David Thomas	2:52
10.	"You Want It All"	LP; Del Rio; Bianco; Jonathan Malone	4:11

Deluxe European version (2017)
No.	Title	Length
1.	"Muddy Waters"	3:48
2.	"No Witness"	3:28
3.	"Lost on You"	4:26
4.	"When We're High"	3:57
5.	"Switchblade"	4:24
6.	"Up Against Me"	3:02
7.	"Suspicion"	3:20
8.	"Other People"	4:04
9.	"Tightrope"	3:38
10.	"Into the Wild"	3:39
11.	"Strange"	3:54
12.	"Death Valley"	2:52
13.	"You Want It All"	4:11
14.	"Long Way to Go to Die"	4:10
15.	"Muddy Waters" (live at Harvard and Stone)	4:21
16.	"Lost on You" (live at Harvard and Stone)	5:02

== Charts ==
=== Weekly charts ===
Chart (2016–2019)	Peak position
Austrian Albums (Ö3 Austria)	34
Belgian Albums (Ultratop Wallonia)	6
Belgian Albums (Ultratop Flanders)	43
Dutch Albums (Album Top 100)	58
French Albums (SNEP)	6
German Albums (Offizielle Top 100)	50
Greek Albums (IFPI)	11
Italian Albums (FIMI)	9
Latvian Albums (LaIPA)	15
Mexican Albums (AMPROFON)	33
Polish Albums (ZPAV)	5
Portuguese Albums (AFP)	46
Scottish Albums (Official Charts)	13
Spanish Albums (Promusicae)	61
Swiss Albums (Schweizer Hitparade)	7
UK Albums (Official Charts)	17
US Heatseekers Albums (Billboard)	7
US Independent Albums (Billboard)	19
US Top Album Sales (Billboard)	87

Chart (2022)	Peak position
Lithuanian Albums (AGATA)	44

=== Year-end charts ===
Chart (2016)	Position
Belgian Albums (Ultratop Wallonia)	157
French Albums (SNEP)	59

Chart (2017)	Position
Belgian Albums (Ultratop Wallonia)	21
French Albums (SNEP)	64
Italian Albums (FIMI)	51
Polish Albums (ZPAV)	19
Swiss Albums (Schweizer Hitparade)	26

Chart (2019)	Position
Mexican Albums (AMPROFON)	78

== Certifications ==
Region	Certification	Certified units/sales
France (SNEP)	2× Platinum	200,000^{‡}
Italy (FIMI)	Platinum	50,000^{‡}
Poland (ZPAV)	2× Platinum	40,000^{‡}
^{‡} Sales+streaming figures based on certification alone.

== Release history ==
Region	Date	Format	Label
Canada	December 9, 2016	CD; digital download	Vagrant
Germany	December 9, 2016	CD; digital download	Vagrant
