= Love Lines =

Studio album by LP
- Released: 29 September 2023
- Genre: Pop rock, indie pop, Latin music
- Length: 40:32
- Label: BMG
- Producer: Andrew Berkeley Martin, Ashton Irwin, Matthew Pauling

LP chronology
Churches (2021)	Love Lines (2023)

Singles from Love Lines
- 1. "Golden" Released: May 11, 2023; 2. "One Like You" Released: June 21, 2023; 3. "Love Song" Released: August 25, 2023; 4. "Long Goodbye" Released: September 3, 2023

Love Lines is the seventh studio album by American singer-songwriter LP, released on 29 September 2023 through BMG.

== Background and release ==
After releasing Churches in 2021, LP returned to the studio to craft new material inspired by personal relationships and emotional experiences. It was her first album while single and marks a moment in which they were coming out of a relationship while falling in love with somebody else. "It's called Love Lines [because] I think I'm capable of several different storylines going on at the same time if you catch my drift. Some call it polyamory, I don't f***ing know!"

In an interview with Correio Braziliense, LP stated that love was the main topic of the album and that it's not only about romantic love, but also about "more intimate love which we experiment from those who show us what's deepest and darkest". They drew inspiration from their own experiences, as well as other people's, to create the 12 songs of the album.

The songs were created in the Cayman Islands and Palm Springs with the help of Ashton Irwin (5 Seconds of Summer), Andrew Berkeley Martin (Palaye Royale) and Matthew Pauling.

The album was announced on May 11, 2023, alongside the release of its lead single, "Golden", which received a video directed by Stephen Schofield. "Golden" was followed by "One Like You" on July 21, and its video featured LP getting a real tattoo. The song was written the night Ronnie Spector died and LP admitted that the track alluded to Spector's past work. The third single, "Love Song", was released on August 25, and the fourth and last one, "Long Goodbye", was released on September 7, with a video filmed in one continuous shot at LP's home.

== Reception ==
Professional ratings
Review scores
Source	Rating
Hot Press	8/10

The album received positive reviews from critics. Renowned for Sound praised its cohesive construction and LP's vocal performance, calling it a "well-constructed, well executed album" that "provides a good menagerie of songs which will cater to all moods of both LP diehards and newbies to LPs music".

Will Russell of Hot Press highlighted the album's stylistic diversity and emotional resonance, praising individual songs including "Long Goodbye", which he compared to Dusty in Memphis-era Dusty Springfield, among other soul legends from the 1960s.

== Track listing ==
Love Lines track listing
No.	Title	Length
1.	"Golden"	3:27
2.	"Wild"	3:01
3.	"Dayglow"	3:31
4.	"Long Goodbye"	4:23
5.	"Love Lines"	3:05
6.	"Hola"	2:36
7.	"One Like You"	3:42
8.	"Love Song"	2:40
9.	"Big Time"	3:31
10.	"Blow"	4:07
11.	"Burn It Down"	2:42
12.	"Hold the Light"	4:32
Total length:		44:17

Deluxe Edition bonus tracks
No.	Title	Length
13.	"A Woman Is Sacred"	4:14
14.	"Mean Streak"	2:18
15.	"Tears in Time"	3:00
Total length:		53:49

== Charts ==
Chart performance for Love Lines
Chart (2023)	Peak position
Belgian Albums (Ultratop Wallonia)	20
French Albums (SNEP)	85
Spanish Albums (Promusicae)	57
Polish Albums (ZPAV)	67
Scottish Albums (OCC)	45
Swiss Albums (Schweizer Hitparade)	26
UK Album Downloads (OCC)	25
