= Heart to Mouth =

Studio album by LP
- Released: December 7, 2018
- Genre: Pop rock
- Length: 45:55
- Label: BMG; Vagrant
- Producer: LP (exec.); Mike Del Rio (also exec.); Ben Romans; Robert Marvin; Mads; Chris Braide; Jayson DeZuzio; Smarter Child; Mika; Cautious Clay; Pat Morrissey; John Castelli; Robopop; Fred Gibson; Mondo Cozmo

LP chronology
Lost on You (2016)	Heart to Mouth (2018)	Live in Moscow (2020)

Singles from Heart to Mouth
- 1. "Girls Go Wild" Released: June 22, 2018; 2. "Recovery" Released: October 11, 2018

Heart to Mouth is the fifth studio album by American singer-songwriter LP, released on December 7, 2018, through BMG. It was preceded by the singles "Girls Go Wild" and "Recovery".

== Background ==
LP said they named the album Heart to Mouth because they feel that when they comes up with melodies, they "can feel that direct line from my heart to my mouth", and that "whether they're sadder songs or big anthems, they all come from the same place."

== Music ==
Gay Star News described the album's sound as "confessional pop-rock", while it was noted as "full pop" by Independent.ie.

== Critical reception ==
Professional ratings
Review scores
Source	Rating
Independent.ie	8/10

James Robinson of Independent.ie said that LP's "smart lyrics that characterised previous releases are all in tact, [sic] delivered in her inimitable Roy Orbison-on-helium tones, but they're matched with an appealing electro-pop backing", summarizing that "LP might yet steal Lady Gaga's crown as the world's strangest, most versatile hit-maker".

== Track listing ==
No.	Title	Writer(s)	Producer(s)	Length
1.	"Dreamcatcher"	Laura Pergolizzi; Michael Francis Gonzalez; Benjamin Romans; Christopher Crowhurst	Ben Romans; Mike Del Rio	3:15
2.	"When I'm Over You"	Pergolizzi; Gonzalez; Nathaniel Campany	Del Rio; Robert Marvin^{[b]}	4:26
3.	"One Night in the Sun"	Pergolizzi; Josh Record; Gonzalez; Campany	Del Rio	4:24
4.	"Girls Go Wild"	Pergolizzi; Gonzalez; Campany	Del Rio	3:43
5.	"Recovery"	Pergolizzi; Christopher Braide; Gonzalez	Romans; Del Rio; *Christopher Braide	3:54
6.	"The Power"	Pergolizzi; Gonzalez; Campany	Del Rio	4:38
7.	"Dreamer"	Pergolizzi; Donnal Missal; Jayson DeZuzio	DeZuzio; Mads^{[a]}; Del Rio^{[a]}	3:25
8.	"House on Fire"	Pergolizzi; Micah Premnath; Richard Markowitz	Smarter Child; Mika^{[b]}	3:01
9.	"Hey Nice to Know Ya"	Pergolizzi; Patrick Morrissey; Joshua Karpeh	Cautious Clay; Pat Morrissey; John Castelli^{[b]}	3:24
10.	"Die for Your Love"	Pergolizzi; Daniel Omelio; Gonzalez; Campany	Del Rio; Robopop	3:39
11.	"Shaken"	Pergolizzi; Fred Gibson; Tristan Landymore	Gibson	3:45
12.	"Special"	Pergolizzi; Joshua Ostrander; Gonzalez	Del Rio; Mondo Cozmo^{[a]}	4:21
Total length:				45:55

== Charts ==
Chart (2018–19)	Peak position
Australian Digital Albums (ARIA)	48
Belgian Albums (Ultratop Flanders)	147
Belgian Albums (Ultratop Wallonia)	34
Canadian Albums (Billboard)	66
Czech Albums (ČNS IFPI)	6
French Albums (SNEP)	48
Italian Albums (FIMI)	29
Latvian Albums (LAIPA)	13
Polish Albums (ZPAV)	6
Spanish Albums (Promusicae)	62
Swiss Albums (Schweizer Hitparade)	22
US Heatseekers Albums (Billboard)	2

== Certifications ==
Region	Certification	Certified units/sales
Poland (ZPAV)	Gold	10,000^{‡}
^{‡} Sales+streaming figures based on certification alone.
