= Aydian Dowling =

American YouTuber, coach, and activist

- Born: July 16, 1987 (age 38); Long Island, New York, U.S.
- Occupations: YouTuber / influencer; entrepreneur; model; fitness & life coach; activist
- Years active: 2009–present
- Relatives: Jenilee Dowling (wife)
- Website: aydiandowling.com

Aydian Dowling (born July 16, 1987) is an American YouTuber, entrepreneur, model, fitness and life coach, and transgender activist. He began his YouTube channel in 2009 to document his journey taking testosterone and experience as a transgender man. In 2015, Aydian was featured on the cover of FTM Magazine recreating a nude photo of Adam Levine, which led to the rise of his modeling career. Aydian won the Reader's Choice Award in the 2015 Men's Health "Ultimate Men's Health Guy", and was featured on the special edition cover in November 2015. He was the first transgender man to be featured on a cover of Men's Health. He was subsequently featured on the covers of both Gay Times magazine and IN Magazine in 2016.

== Personal life ==
Dowling grew up in Long Island with two older brothers and two step-siblings. He was often described as a tomboy from a young age.

During his teenage years, Dowling came out as a lesbian, but he felt like this did not fully describe his experience. He felt out of place, even among masculine lesbians. He had his first girlfriend at 16, and he began to question his identity when one of his girlfriends asked if he ever wanted to be a boy. Dowling considered the idea of being transgender, but he was disillusioned by the media's primarily transgender representation being drag king and drag queen performers, most of whom are cisgender outside of their persona. Dowling first found out about the existence of transgender men on the internet, where he saw a clip of Maury posted in 2007, in which Maury Povich interviews Thomas Lando and his sister about Lando's transition. Following this, Dowling first realized he was a trans man in February 2009.

In an interview with Metro Weekly, Dowling described his experience with gender and gender dysphoria:

Not only did I feel like I match with the physical, but the emotional things they were talking about, the feelings of not feeling good in your body. And not just because you want to lose five pounds or you want blond hair and you have brown hair, but actually just disassociating from the body that you're in, and feeling like you're stuck in it. Feeling like there's another person in your brain, but this is the body you have.

Shortly after coming out, Aydian met his now-wife, Jenilee Dowling, who he married in 2012. On November 1, 2018, Aydian and Jenilee welcomed their first child, Antler Joseph Dowling. They chose the name Antler because antlers symbolize "the cycle of death and rebirth".

== Career ==
Right after high school, Aydian enrolled in community college to be a writer. However, it was a poor fit and he eventually dropped out, and instead went to culinary school to work as a pastry chef. Before becoming an LGBTQ+ advocate, Aydian worked for a few years as a baker. Freedom for All Americans wrote a story on Aydian's experience being fired from a bakery job in Oregon following coming out to the owners of the shop, and include a video he recorded for his YouTube channel about his experience with employment discrimination for being transgender.

It was not until Aydian and his wife moved from Florida to New York to be closer to his wife's father, that he pivoted into his entrepreneurial work and devoted more time to his company, Point5cc.

Since coming out, Aydian's career has kicked off in many directions, as an influencer, trans activist, model, and life / fitness coach.

=== Modeling career ===
Aydian Dowling was featured on the cover of FTM Magazine's Spring 2015 issue. In it, Dowling recreated a nearly-nude photo of American singer Adam Levine.

Also in 2015, Aydian competed in the Men's Health "Ultimate Men's Health Guy" competition. He lost the cover contest, but won the Reader's Choice award with over 72,000 votes. Aydian appeared on the special edition cover with four other contestants, making him the first transgender man to be represented in Men's Health.

=== Entrepreneurship ===
In 2012, Aydian founded his clothing company Point 5cc. The name, Point 5cc, refers to the common dosage prescribed for hormone replacement therapy. The company made an effort to donate a portion of proceeds to their Annual Transgender Surgery Fund, and also established a chest binder donation program. Due to demand for additional support in the trans community, the founders of Point 5cc created a sister non-profit organization, Point of Pride. This is a trans-led 501(c)(3) nonprofit organization, which Aydian continues to serve on the Board of Directors as the President and Co-Founder. Point of Pride distributes free binders to trans masculine people and has "helped over ten thousand people receive gender affirming garments and surgeries".

More recently, Aydian has become the CEO and co-founder of TRΔCE, an app (in development as of March 2022) designed to help transgender individuals share their transition experience with other trans individuals.

=== YouTuber and social media influencer ===
Dowling began documenting his transition on YouTube (originally named ALionsFears) in 2009. As of March 2022, Aydian's YouTube has over 81,000 subscribers.

In 2017, he and his wife Jenilee created the web series Our Journey To Pregnancy, in which they publicly shared "the joys and difficulties of getting pregnant in a transgender relationship".

=== Life and fitness coach ===
Aydian began bodybuilding to masculinize his body after coming out as transgender. As a part of his fitness journey, Aydian previously ran a YouTube channel named Beefheads Fitness, to coach transgender men on how to live a fit lifestyle. This YouTube has been inactive since 2015, and since deleted.

Aydian has also done in-person bodybuilding training for transgender men in Eugene, Oregon, and currently works as a life coach and public speaker.

== Impact ==
Dowling's cover on Men's Health came out the same year that Laverne Cox was featured on the cover of Time magazine. His appearance on the cover contributed to this wave of increasing media coverage of transgender individuals in the mid 2010s, described by Time as "The Transgender Tipping Point". Dowling's appearance in Men's Health positively affected the lives of other transgender men, and his work has inspired other transgender people to create their own blogs and YouTube channels to document their own experiences. In addition to providing meaningful representation, Aydian responds to hundreds of emails a month to help people in their own transitions.

== Media appearances ==
- April 2015: FTM Magazine cover
- May 26, 2015: The Ellen Show, "The Astounding Aydian Dowling"
- October 14, 2015: The Ellen Show, "Aydian Dowling Catches Up with Ellen"
- November 2015: Men's Health cover.
- March 2016: Gay Times cover
- June 2016: IN Magazine cover
