= Powers (duo) =

American electropop band

POWERS
- Genres: Alternative pop; electropop; progressive pop
- Label: Republic Records
- Members: Mike Del Rio; Crista Ru

Powers (stylized in all caps) is a musical duo composed of Mike Del Rio and Crista Ru.

Their music has been described as alternative pop, electropop, and progressive pop. Time has called their music "groovy and futuristic".

== Music ==
"Gimme Some" was the duo's first official release. Other songs in their discography include "Dance", "Heavy", "Man on the Moon", "Closer", "Just Kids", and "Georgie". The music video for "Closer" was released in May 2017.

The duo's debut studio album, Alpha, was set to release on April 7, 2017. However, this release did not occur, as an article in Nylon from later that year wrote about the duo's track "Georgie" being set to appear on their "upcoming debut album".

== Discography ==
=== EPs ===
- Legendary (2015)

=== Singles ===
==== as lead artist ====
- "Touch the World" (2014)
- "Gimme Some" (2014)
- "Money" (2014)
- "Beat of My Drum" (2015)
- "Hot" (2015)
- "Legendary" (2015)
- "Loved By You" (2015)
- "Dance" (2017)
- "Heavy" (2017)
- "Man on the Moon" (2017)
- "Closer" (2017)
- "Heavy" (2017)

==== as featured artist ====
- "Classic" (2014), The Knocks featuring POWERS
