= Heart-Shaped Scar =

Studio album by LP
- Released: June 26, 2001
- Recorded: March 2000 - March 12, 2001
- Studios: Sound of Music Studios, Uptime Studios
- Genre: Rock
- Label: Koch Records
- Producers: David Lowery (tracks 1, 2, 4, 7-11), Barb Morrison (tracks 3, 5 and 6), Charles Nieland (tracks 3, 5 and 6), Laura "LP" Pergolizzi (tracks 3, 5 and 6)

LP chronology
Heart-Shaped Scar (2001)	Suburban Sprawl & Alcohol (2004)

Heart-Shaped Scar is the debut studio album by American singer LP, released in 2001.

== Reception ==
Allmusic reviewed the album positively, grading it with four stars out of five. Thom Jurek, who reviewed the album noted: "LP's debut, Heart-Shaped Scar, is a roaring, snotty, bratty, bad-ass pop/rock record full of killer riffs, crunching guitars, and LP's voice, which is equal parts Maggie Bell, Pat Benatar, and Robert Plant ground like glass through a deep Rolling Stones, Bad Company, Lynyrd Skynyrd, blues-rock, and biker sensibility."

== Track listing ==
No.	Title	Writer(s)	Length
1.	"Perfect"	LP; David Lowery	5:14
2.	"Love Somebody"	LP; Lowery; Alan Weatherhead	5:01
3.	"Heart-Shaped Scar"	LP; Barb Morrison; Charles Neiland	4:30
4.	"Coming Home"	Johnny Hickman; LP	4:49
5.	"Long Time"	LP; Morrison; Neiland	3:21
6.	"Kiss It All Goodbye"	LP; Morrison; Neiland	4:22
7.	"Shut You Out"	LP; Lowery	4:45
8.	"Follow Me Down"	LP; Lowery	5:26
9.	"Insane"	LP	4:14
10.	"When I'm Not with You"	LP; Lowery; Weatherhead	5:21
11.	"Greenbriar"	LP; Lowery; Weatherhead	3:41
