= LP (singer) =

American musician (born 1981)

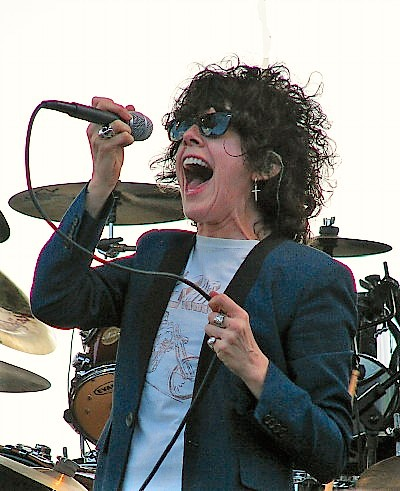
- LP performing in 2014

Background information
- Also known as: LP
- Born: Laura Pergolizzi; March 18, 1981 (age 45); Huntington Station, New York, U.S.
- Genres: Pop rock; alternative rock
- Occupation: Singer-songwriter
- Instruments: Vocals; guitar; ukulele; harmonica
- Years active: 1998–present
- Label: Warner Bros. Records (2012–present)
- Website: iamlp.com

Laura Pergolizzi (born March 18, 1981), known professionally as LP, is an American singer, musician and songwriter from Brooklyn, New York. LP has released seven albums and three EPs. LP has written songs for other artists including Rihanna, Christina Aguilera, the Backstreet Boys, Leona Lewis, Mylène Farmer, Cher Lloyd and Céline Dion.

== Early life ==
Pergolizzi was born in 1981 in Huntington Station, on Long Island, to Italian-American parents, their paternal grandfather coming from Palermo and grandmother from Naples. Pergolizzi grew up in Huntington Station and attended Walt Whitman High School. When Pergolizzi was 16 years old, their mother died. In 2014, Pergolizzi wrote the song "Forever For Now" in memory of their mother. They began using the name "LP" after moving to New York City in 2004.

== Career ==
David Lowery of the band Cracker saw LP performing and featured them on "Cinderella", a hidden track on the band's 1998 album Gentleman's Blues, which features LP's backing vocals on two other tracks. Lowery followed up by producing LP's debut album Heart-Shaped Scar, released in 2001 on Koch Records. LP's second album, Suburban Sprawl & Alcohol, was released in 2004 on Lightswitch Records. On the record, they collaborated with songwriter and music producer Linda Perry. Despite extensive touring to promote it and favorable reviews, the album failed to gain widespread recognition.

=== 2006–2010 ===
In 2006, LP appeared at the music conference South by Southwest and reportedly sparked a bidding war among major music labels, eventually being signed by L.A. Reid to The Island Def Jam Music Group record label, part of the Universal Music Group. However, due to artistic differences, LP left the contract. In 2007, they signed with SoBe Entertainment, an independent label, with the album tracks they had written at the major label. "Love Will Keep You Up All Night", one of the tracks they wrote at The Island Def Jam Music Group with Billy Mann, was released in late 2007 on the Backstreet Boys album Unbreakable. LP wrote and performed "Wasted", from the album Suburban Sprawl & Alcohol. "Wasted" was used as the theme song for the TV series South of Nowhere, which aired on Noggin's teen block, The N. MTV's The Hills also featured LP's song "Damage Is Done" in 2009, and it was released on iTunes.

During 2009, LP started writing songs for other artists, including several songs on Heidi Montag's album Superficial, released by Warner Music Group. LP co-wrote the single "More Is More" and the album's tracks, "Twisted", "Hey Boy", and "Love It or Leave It". They also co-wrote other tracks for and with Montag, such as the Cathy Dennis co-written "Look How I'm Doin'", "I Do This", and "Who's That Girl". A song LP wrote with Alexander Kronlund, "Standing Where You Left Me", was released on Erik Hassle's debut UK album, Pieces, released by Island Records and Republic Records. LP moved to Los Angeles in 2010.

=== 2011–2012 ===
In August 2010, it was announced that LP had signed with RedOne's record label, 2011 Records. LP landed their first major breakthrough as a songwriter, co-writing the song "Cheers (Drink to That)", featured on Rihanna's fifth studio album, Loud, released in November 2010 on Def Jam Recordings. "Cheers" features a vocal hook performed by LP (taken from Avril Lavigne's "I'm with You"). In a 2010 interview with MTV News, Rihanna said about "Cheers": "I love that song. That is one of my favorite songs on the album. It makes you feel like celebrating. It gives you a great feeling inside like you want to go out and have a drink... People can't wait for the weekend." LP's major label songwriting breakthroughs continued, and they co-wrote "Beautiful People", performed by Christina Aguilera. The song is featured on the Burlesque: Original Motion Picture Soundtrack album, which was released in November 2010 on RCA Records.

In June 2011, LP co-wrote "Afraid to Sleep", which was performed by NBC's The Voice finalist Vicci Martinez and reached #10 on the iTunes Top Singles Chart. In September 2011, LP signed a deal with Warner Bros. Records. Shortly thereafter, "Into the Wild", written and performed by LP, was prominently used in a Citibank national television advertisement campaign. In April 2012, LP released their first major-label album, Into the Wild: Live at EastWest Studios, a five-song live extended play, and started touring extensively, including at festivals such as SXSW, Bonnaroo, Lollapalooza, Bumbershoot, Tropfest, Tokyo's Sonic Boom, and London's Hyde Park. In 2012, LP became the first female Martin Guitar ambassador.

=== 2013–2017 ===
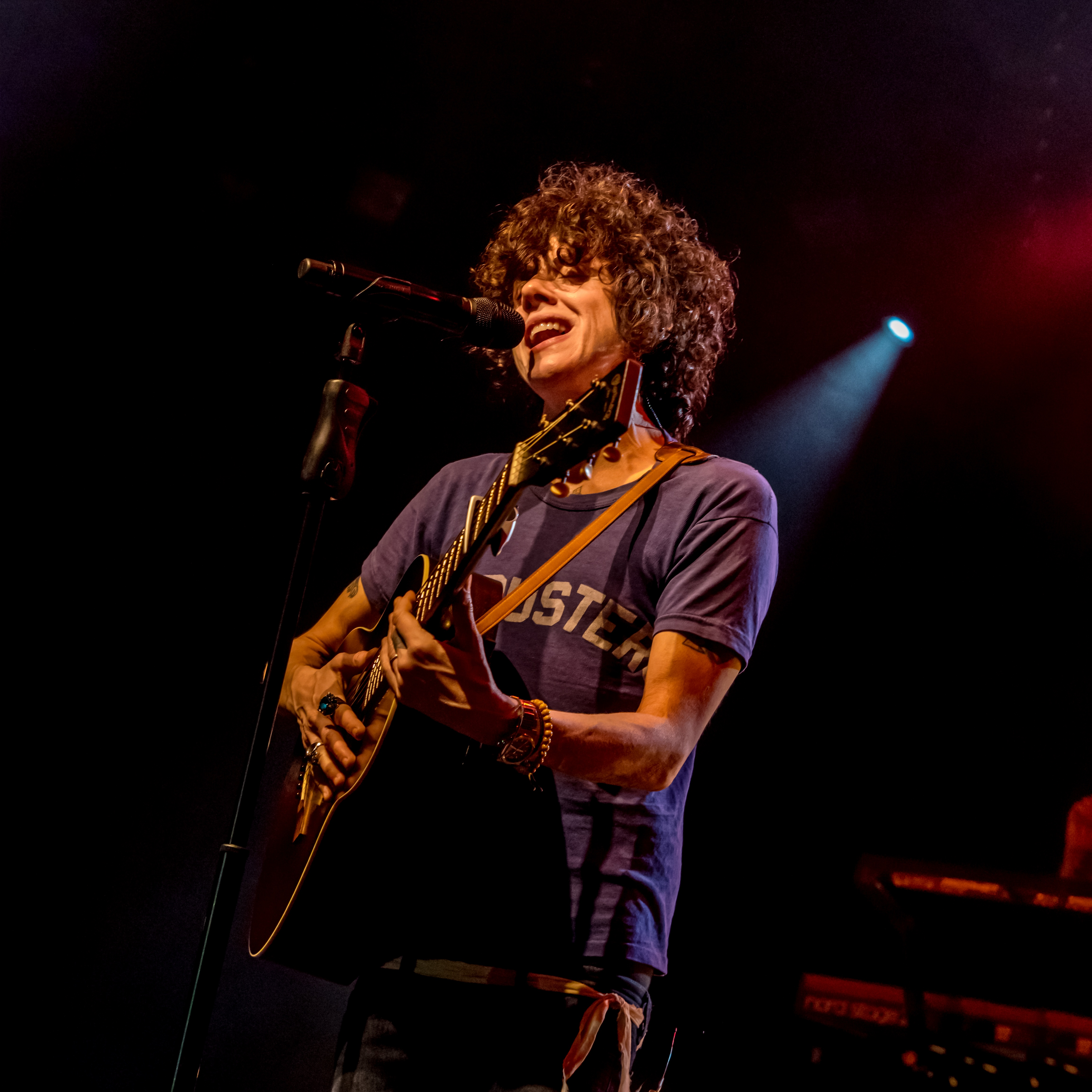
LP at the Zelt-Musik-Festival 2018 in Freiburg, Germany

In May 2012, LP was the Artist of the Week in Vogue magazine. Over the next two years, they completed recording an album that included collaborations with Billy Steinberg, Isabella "Machine" Summers (from Florence and the Machine), Josh Alexander, Claude Kelly, Justyn Pilbrow, Carl Ryden, and Rob Kleiner. The album was produced by Rob Cavallo, Warner Bros. Records' chairman and producer. On April 1, 2014, it was announced that LP's third full-length studio album would be titled Forever for Now and was scheduled to be released on June 3. The album was promoted by the lead single "Night Like This". A second single, "Someday", was released in June 2014 in Canada. On September 16, a video for "Tokyo Sunrise" premiered on Time magazine's website.

In September 2015, the song "Muddy Waters" was released as the first single from LP's fourth studio album, Lost on You. In November 2015, one of LP's best-known songs, "Lost on You", was released to great success. LP's songs also include their whistling.

In June 2016, "Muddy Waters" featured in the closing scene of the season four finale of Netflix's original series Orange Is the New Black. It was also featured in the trailer for the NBC show Shades of Blue. "Muddy Waters" clarifies the ending of season 5, episode 4 of the Starz show Power. In November, the single "Lost on You" was released, while LP held a residency at the No Vacancy club. Both songs originate from a collaboration with Mike Del Rio. The EP Death Valley was released on June 17, 2016.

On April 25, 2017, LP appeared on the BBC Show "Later... With Jools Holland" and performed "Lost on You".

The song "Hi Ho Nobody Home" by David Baerwald featuring LP was used in an episode of Mr. Mercedes. In 2017 LP performed the song "Back Where I Belong" (Otto Knows featuring Avicii) for episode 5 of season 2 of Netflix's original series Sense8.

LP duets with Mylène Farmer on the single N'oublie pas, released on June 22. The single immediately hit number 1 on the French iTunes chart upon release. The track is the second single from Farmer's album Désobéissance.

=== 2018–present ===
On June 15, 2018, LP announced on their Facebook page that they had been working on a new album. A day later, the first track from the record, "Girls Go Wild", was released. "Recovery" was released later.

In September 2018, LP recorded two songs for Morrissey's new album of cover songs.

In October 2019, the song "Strange" was featured in a commercial for the Samsung Galaxy phone.

In June 2019, LP gave an exclusive interview to ÖMC Dergi, Turkey's biggest digital music magazine, as part of the promotion of the album Heart to Mouth, and became the cover star of a magazine for the first time in Turkey. Sharing the cover photo of ÖMC Dergi, which introduced their album for the first time and gave an interview, LP posted on all their social media accounts, "Interview + Cover Artist for June!! Ankara – See you Soon!" The director and photographer Darren Craig took the photoshoot for ÖMC Dergi's June 2019 issue. LP performed three big concerts in Istanbul, İzmir, and Ankara after giving the interview.

"How Low Can You Go" and "The One That You Love" were released in 2020. "One Last Time", "Goodbye", and "Angles" were released in 2021. All five songs were released as singles for the album Churches, which was released on December 3 that year. In 2021, LP released the song "Fighter" with Imanbek.

In October 2022, LP was featured on the song "Line It Up" on American band Palaye Royale's album Fever Dream`.

In September 2023, they released their album Love Lines which featured singles "Golden", "One Like You" and "Long Goodbye".

In February 2024, LP appeared in a Russian hoodie in an Instagram video, which they said was a gift from their Russian fans. Their concert in Kaunas, Lithuania, was later canceled in response.

LP appeared in Christian Louboutin's presentation at Paris Fashion Week in 2024 and sang "Lost On You".

On April 29, 2026, they released the song "Shelly" which is the lead single off of their upcoming album, Room 12. The album will be supported by the All Is Not Lost Tour which is celebrating 10 years of the Lost on You album.

== Personal life ==
Pergolizzi is a lesbian, and said in a 2016 interview: "It's not important to prove myself as a lesbian. But nevertheless visibility is important. We are normal people just like anybody else."

Pergolizzi wrote the song "Lost on You" after a breakup with actress Tamzin Brown. Pergolizzi was later in a relationship with American singer-songwriter Lauren Ruth Ward, who appears in the video. LP also dated Mexican actress Julieta Grajales; their relationship ended in 2022. In 2023 LP began a relationship with Czech model Iveta Maurerová.

Pergolizzi is gender-neutral but said in 2018 they are "equally comfortable" being considered a "garden variety lesbian woman". In 2021, Pergolizzi shifted to using they/them pronouns, saying in an interview, "I’m kind of transitioning over to the they/them thing; it's more my kind of vibe". As of May 2023, Pergolizzi's official bio also uses the singular they.

== Discography ==
=== Studio albums ===
List of studio albums, with selected chart positions
| Title | Album details | Peak chart positions | | | | | | | | | | Sales | Certifications |
| Title | Album details | US | BEL (WA) | CZE | FRA | ITA | POL | SVK | SPA | SWI | UK | Sales | Certifications |
|---|---|---|---|---|---|---|---|---|---|---|---|---|---|
| Heart-Shaped Scar | Released: 2001; Label: Koch; Formats: CD, digital download | — | — | — | — | — | — | — | — | — | — | | |
| Suburban Sprawl & Alcohol | Released: June 29, 2004; Label: Lightswitch; Formats: CD, digital download | — | — | — | — | — | — | — | — | — | — | | |
| Forever for Now | Released: June 2, 2014; Label: Warner Bros.; Format: CD, digital download, LP | 132 | 73 | 41 | — | — | — | 70 | — | — | — | US: 16,000 (Note: United States sales figures for Forever for Now as of September 2016.) | |
| Lost on You | Released: December 9, 2016; Label: Vagrant; Format: CD, digital download, LP | — (Note: Lost on You did not enter the US Billboard 200, but peaked at number seven on the US Heatseekers Albums Chart.) | 4 | 4 | 6 | 8 | 5 | 12 | 61 | 7 | 17 | POL: 40,000 | FIMI: Platinum; SNEP: Platinum; ZPAV: 2× Platinum |
| Heart to Mouth | Released: December 7, 2018; Label: BMG, Vagrant; Format: CD, digital download, LP, streaming | — (Note: Heart to Mouth did not enter the US Billboard 200, but peaked at number two on the US Heatseekers Albums Chart.) | 34 | 6 | 48 | 29 | 6 | 47 | 62 | 22 | — (Note: Heart to Mouth did not enter the UK Albums Chart, but peaked at number 33 on the UK Album Downloads Chart.) | POL: 10,000 | ZPAV: Gold |
| Churches | Released: December 3, 2021; Label: PIAS; Format: CD, digital download, LP, streaming | — | 54 | 8 | 75 | 88 | 39 | — | — | 33 | — (Note: Churches did not enter the UK Albums Chart, but peaked at number 26 on the UK Album Downloads Chart.) | | |
| Love Lines | Released: September 29, 2023; Label: Ukerazy Productions, BMG; Formats: CD, digital download, LP, streaming | — | 20 | — | 85 | — | 67 | — | 57 | 26 | — (Note: Love Lines did not enter the UK Albums Chart, but peaked at number 46 on the UK Album Sales Chart.) | | |
| Room 12 | Released: September 2, 2026; Label: Music for Now; Formats: LP digital download, streaming | TBA | | | | | | | | | | | |
"—" denotes releases that did not chart or were not released in that territory.

=== Live albums ===
List of live albums, with selected chart positions
| Title | Album details |
|---|---|
| Live in Moscow | Released: May 29, 2020; Label: BMG, Vagrant; Format: Digital download, LP, streaming |

=== Extended plays ===
List of extended plays, with selected chart positions
| Title | Details | Peak chart positions | | | | | Sales | Certifications |
| Title | Details | US Heat | US SA | FRA | POL | SWI | Sales | Certifications |
|---|---|---|---|---|---|---|---|---|
| Into the Wild: Live at EastWest Studios | Released: April 24, 2012; Label: Warner Bros. Records; Format: CD/DVD, digital download, LP | 6 | 6 | — | — | — | | |
| Spotify Sessions | Released: October 2, 2012; Format: Streaming | —N/a | | | | | | |
| Death Valley | Released: June 17, 2016; Format: Digital download | — | — | 75 | 4 | 41 | US: 3,000 (Note: United States sales figures for Death Valley as of September 2016.); POL: 10,000 | ZPAV: Gold |
"—" denotes items which were not released in that country or failed to chart.

=== Singles ===
List of singles, with selected chart positions
| Title | Year | Peak chart positions | | | | | | | | | | Certifications | Album |
| Title | Year | US Rock | AUT | BEL (WA) | CZE | FRA | GRE | ITA | POL | SVK | SWI | Certifications | Album |
|---|---|---|---|---|---|---|---|---|---|---|---|---|---|
| "Good with You" | 2007 | — | — | — | — | — | — | — | — | — | — | | Non-album single |
| "Into the Wild" (Live) | 2012 | — | — | — | — | — | — | — | — | — | — | | Into the Wild: Live at EastWest Studios |
| "Into the Wild" | 2012 | — | — | — | — | — | — | — | — | — | — | | Forever for Now |
| "Night Like This" | 2014 | — | — | — | — | — | — | — | — | — | — | | Forever for Now |
| "Someday" | 2014 | — | — | — | — | — | — | — | — | — | — | | Forever for Now |
| "Muddy Waters" | 2015 | 42 | — | — | — | 171 | — | — | — | — | — | | Death Valley and Lost on You |
| "Lost on You" | 2015 | 42 | 4 | 1 | 1 | 1 | 1 | 5 | 1 | 1 | 5 | BPI: Silver; FIMI: 4× Platinum; IFPI AUT: Gold; IFPI GRE: Platinum; IFPI SWI: Platinum; SNEP: Diamond; ZPAV: Platinum | Death Valley and Lost on You |
| "Other People" | 2016 | — | — | 42 | — | 117 | 5 | 45 | 7 | — | — | FIMI: Platinum | Death Valley and Lost on You |
| "N'oublie pas" (with Mylène Farmer) | 2018 | — | — | — (Note: "N'oublie pas" did not reach the region's Ultratop 50 chart, but charted at number 17 on the Ultratip Bubbling Under ranking.) | — | 1 | — | — | — | — | — | | Désobéissance |
| "Girls Go Wild" | 2018 | — | — | — (Note: "Girls Go Wild" did not reach the region's Ultratop 50 chart, but charted at number 2 on the Ultratip Bubbling Under ranking.) | 1 | — | — | 77 | 8 | 2 | — (Note: "Girls Go Wild" did not enter the Swiss Singles chart, but charted at number 74 on the Swiss Airplay chart.) | FIMI: Gold; ZPAV: Gold | Heart to Mouth |
| "Recovery" | 2018 | — | — | — (Note: "Recovery" did not reach the region's Ultratop 50 chart, but charted at number 2 on the Ultratip Bubbling Under ranking.) | — | 70 | — | 89 | — | — | — | | Heart to Mouth |
| "The One That You Love" | 2020 | — | — | — (Note: "The One That You Love" did not reach the region's Ultratop 50 chart, but charted at number 33 on the Ultratip Bubbling Under ranking.) | 50 | — | — | — | — | 87 | — | | Churches |
| "How Low Can You Go" | 2020 | — (Note: "How Low Can You Go" did not enter the Hot Rock & Alternative Songs chart, but peaked at number 31 on the Triple A Airplay chart.) | — | — (Note: "How Low Can You Go" did not reach the region's Ultratop 50 chart, but charted at number 37 on the Ultratip Bubbling Under ranking.) | — | — | — | — | 23 | 86 | — | | Churches |
| "One Last Time" | 2021 | — | — | — | — | — | — | — | — | 82 | — (Note: "One Last Time" did not enter the Swiss Singles chart, but charted at number 84 on the Swiss Airplay chart.) | | Churches |
| "Goodbye" | 2021 | — | — | — | — | — | — | — | — | — | — | | Churches |
| "Fighter" (with Imanbek) | 2021 | — | — | — | — | — | — | — | — | — | — | | Non-album single |
| "Angels" | 2021 | — | — | — | 98 | — | — | — | — | — | — | | Churches |
| "Golden" | 2023 | — | — | — | — | — | — | — | — | 79 | — | | Love Lines |
| "One Like You" | 2023 | — (Note: "One Like You" did not enter the Hot Rock & Alternative Songs chart, but peaked at number 23 on the Triple A Airplay chart.) | — | — | — | — | — | — | — | — | — | | Love Lines |
| "Love Song" | 2023 | — | — | — | — | — | — | — | — | — | — | | Love Lines |
| "Long Goodbye" | 2023 | — | — | — | — | — | — | — | — | — | — | | Love Lines |
| "Human" (with Cheat Codes) | 2025 | — | — | — | — | — | — | — | — | — | — | | Future Renaissance |
| "Get To Love You" (with 220 KID) | 2025 | — | — | — | — | — | — | — | — | — | — | | Yellow Butterflies |
| "Shelly" | 2026 | — | — | — | — | — | — | — | — | — | — | | Room 12 |
| "Love Is All I Have" | 2026 | — | — | — | — | — | — | — | — | — | — | | Room 12 |
| "Best in Life" | 2026 | — | — | — | — | — | — | — | — | — | — | | Room 12 |
| "Mi Corazón" | 2026 | — | — | — | — | — | — | — | — | — | — | | Room 12 |
| "Don't stop" | 2026 | — | — | — | — | — | — | — | — | — | — | | |
"—" denotes items which were not released in that country or failed to chart.

=== Other charted songs ===
| Title | Year | Peak chart positions | | | | Album |
| Title | Year | CZE | FRA | POL | SVK | Album |
|---|---|---|---|---|---|---|
| "No Witness" | 2016 | — | — | 33 | — | Lost on You |
| "Tightrope" | 2016 | — | 56 | — | 58 | Lost on You |
| "Strange" | 2016 | 44 | — | — | — | Lost on You |
| "Death Valley" | 2016 | — | 50 | — | — | Lost on You |
| "When We're High" | 2017 | — | 123 | 18 | — | Lost on You |
"—" denotes items which were not released in that country or failed to chart.

=== Music videos ===
| Title | Year |
|---|---|
| "Wasted" | 2004 |
| "Good with You"/"Cling to Me" | 2007 |
| "Someday" | 2011 |
| "Into the Wild" | 2012 |
| "Tokyo Sunrise" | 2014 |
| "Halo" | 2016 |
| "Lost on You" | 2016 |
| "Night like This" | 2016 |
| "Other People" (2 versions) | 2016/2017 |
| "Tightrope" | 2017 |
| "When We're High" | 2017 |
| "No Witness" | 2017 |
| "N'oublie pas" | 2018 |
| "Girls Go Wild" | 2018 |
| "Recovery" | 2018 |
| "Shaken" (Animated) | 2019 |
| "Lost on You" (Live in Moscow) | 2020 |
| "The One That You Love" | 2020 |
| "How Low Can You Go" | 2020 |
| "One Last Time" | 2021 |
| "Goodbye" | 2021 |
| "Fighter" | 2021 |
| "Angels" | 2021 |
| "Conversation" | 2021 |

== Songwriting credits ==
| Year | Artist | Song | Album |
|---|---|---|---|
| 2007 | Backstreet Boys | "Love Will Keep You Up All Night" | Unbreakable |
| 2010 | Erik Hassle | "Standing Where You Left Me" | Taken EP |
| 2010 | Lolene | "Limousine" | Electrick Hotel |
| 2010 | Lolene | "Messed Up" | Electrick Hotel |
| 2010 | Heidi Montag | "Look How I'm Doin'" | Superficial |
| 2010 | Heidi Montag | "More is More" | Superficial |
| 2010 | Heidi Montag | "Twisted" | Superficial |
| 2010 | Heidi Montag | "Hey Boy" | Superficial |
| 2010 | Heidi Montag | "I'll Do It" | Superficial |
| 2010 | Heidi Montag | "Love It or Leave It" | Superficial |
| 2010 | Heidi Montag | "Sex Ed" | Non-album single |
| 2010 | Christina Aguilera | "Beautiful People" | Burlesque: Original Motion Picture Soundtrack |
| 2011 | Rihanna | "Cheers (Drink to That)" | Loud |
| 2011 | Hitomi | "2010 ~金儲けのHeaven & Paradise~" | SPIRIT |
| 2011 | Greyson Chance featuring Charice | "Waiting Outside the Lines" Remix | Non-album single |
| 2011 | Vicci Martinez (The Voice) | "Afraid to Sleep" | Non-album single |
| 2012 | Luciana | "I'm Still Hot" | Non-album single |
| 2012 | Chiddy Bang | "Happening" | Non-album single |
| 2012 | Joe Walsh | "Hi-Roller Baby" | Analog Man |
| 2012 | Rita Ora | "Shine Ya Light" | Ora |
| 2012 | The Veronicas | "Lolita" | Non-album single |
| 2012 | Leona Lewis | "Fingerprint" | Glassheart |
| 2012 | Mr. Downstairs | "Superhero Heart" | Superhero Heart EP |
| 2013 | Cher | "Red" | Closer to the Truth |
| 2013 | Cher | "Pride" | Closer to the Truth |
| 2014 | Karmin | "Tidal Wave" | Pulses |
| 2014 | Cher Lloyd | "Human" | Sorry I'm Late |
| 2014 | The Veronicas | "Line of Fire" | The Veronicas |
| 2015 | Ella Henderson | "Mirror Man" | Chapter One |
| 2015 | Andee | "Beautiful Bullet" | Black and White Heart |
| 2015 | Dave Audé featuring Jessica Sutta | "Gonna Get U" | Non-album single |
| 2016 | Cazzette | "Solo Para Ti" | Desserts EP |
| 2016 | Nick Fradiani | "Every Day" | Hurricane |
| 2016 | Nick Fradiani | "Nothing to Lose" | Hurricane |
| 2016 | The Years | "The Fear" | Street Queen |
| 2016 | Hypercolor featuring Julietta | "Animal" | Non-album single |
| 2017 | Will Heard | "I Better Love You" | Trust EP |
| 2017 | Marina Kaye | "Miracle" | Explicit |
| 2017 | Charlotte OC | "Blackout" | Careless People |
| 2017 | Charlotte OC | "Medicine Man" | Careless People |
| 2017 | The Kooks | "Broken Vow" | The Best of... So Far |
| 2017 | Serena Ryder | "Rollercoaster" | Utopia |
| 2017 | Aria | "Sunshine" | Sunshine EP |
| 2017 | Spoon | "Tear it Down" | Hot Thoughts |
| 2019 | Mylène Farmer | "Des larmes" | Désobéissance |
| 2019 | Celine Dion | "Change My Mind" | Courage |
| 2019 | EMIN | "Pedestal" | Good Love |
| 2019 | Elisa | "Thirst (For You Only)" | Diari aperti |
| 2021 | Spencer Ludwig | "Down-n-out in California" | Non-album single |
| 2022 | Noah Cyrus | "I Just Want a Lover" | The Hardest Part |

== Awards and nominations ==
| Award | Year | Nominee(s) | Category | Result | Ref. |
|---|---|---|---|---|---|
| Žebřík Music Award | 2020 | LP | Best International Female | Won | |
