= Into the Wild: Live at EastWest Studios =

EP by LP
- Released: April 24, 2012
- Studio: EastWest Studios, Hollywood, CA
- Genre: Alternative rock; indie rock; indie pop
- Label: Warner Bros.

LP chronology
Suburban Sprawl & Alcohol (2004)	Into the Wild: Live at EastWest Studios (2012)	Forever for Now (2014)

Singles from Into the Wild (Live at EastWest Studios)
- 1. "Into the Wild (Live)" Released: February 24, 2012

Professional ratings
Review scores
Source	Rating
AllMusic	3/5 stars

Into the Wild: Live at EastWest Studios is a five-track live EP, released by American singer LP on April 24, 2012 through Warner Bros. Records.

== Release ==
The EP was initially released as a CD/DVD and digital download. On April 20, 2013, a 12" vinyl version, featuring a bonus track "It's Over", was released for the 2013 Record Store Day in a number of 1850 copies.

== Track listing ==
CD / 12" Vinyl
No.	Title	Length
1.	"Into the Wild" (Live)	4:01
2.	"Levitator" (Live)	4:30
3.	"Tokyo Sunrise" (Live)	4:17
4.	"Wasted Love" (Live)	4:13
5.	"Someday" (Live)	4:30
6.	"Into the Wild"	3:53

12" Vinyl Bonus Track
No.	Title	Length
7.	"It's Over"

DVD
No.	Title	Length
1.	"Into the Wild" (Live)	3:50
2.	"Levitator" (Live)	4:29
3.	"Tokyo Sunrise" (Live)	4:16
4.	"Wasted Love" (Live)	4:06
5.	"Someday" (Live)	4:31

== Charts ==
Chart (2012)	Peak Position
US Heatseekers Albums (Billboard)	6

== Release history ==
Region	Date	Formats	Label
United States	April 24, 2012	CD/DVD, digital download	Warner Bros.
Poland	April 19, 2013	12" limited edition vinyl	Warner Bros.
United States	April 20, 2013	12" limited edition vinyl	Warner Bros.
