= Call of the Wild (disambiguation) =

The Call of the Wild is a 1903 novel by Jack London.

Call of the Wild may also refer to:

== Film and television ==
=== Adaptations of London's novel ===
- The Call of the Wild (1923 film), an American film by Hal Roach starring Jack Mulhall
- Call of the Wild (1935 film), an American film starring Clark Gable and Loretta Young
- The Call of the Wild (1972 film), a British film starring Charlton Heston
- The Call of the Wild (1976 film), an American TV film with a screenplay by James Dickey
- Call of the Wild (1993), an American TV film starring Rick Schroder
- The Call of the Wild: Dog of the Yukon (1997), a Canadian TV film starring Rutger Hauer
- Call of the Wild (TV series), a 2000 adventure series on Animal Planet, that is later condensed into a feature-length film
- Call of the Wild (2009 film), an American film starring Christopher Lloyd
- The Call of the Wild (2020 film), an American film starring Harrison Ford
  - The Call of the Wild (soundtrack)

=== Other films ===
- The Call of the Wild (1908 film), an American short film directed by D.W. Griffith
- The Call of the Wild (2007 film), a documentary by Ron Lamothe about the American wanderer Christopher McCandless

=== Television ===
- "Call of the Wild" (Due South), a two-part episode of Due South
- "Call of the Wild" (The Cosby Show), an episode of The Cosby Show

== Music ==
=== Albums ===
- Call of the Wild (Powerwolf album), 2021
- Call of the Wild (Lee Aaron album), 1985
- Call of the Wild (Wild Willy Barrett album), 1979
- Call of the Wild (D-A-D album), 1986
- Call of the Wild (Frankie Laine album), 1962
- Call of the Wild (Ted Nugent and the Amboy Dukes album), or the title song
- Call of the Wild (Aaron Tippin album), or the title song
- Call of the Wild, an album by Ellen Shipley and its title song

=== Songs ===
- "Call of the Wild" (song), a 1987 song by Deep Purple
- "Call of the Wild", by Black Sabbath from Headless Cross
- "Call of the Wild", by Chris LeDoux from Whatcha Gonna Do with a Cowboy
- "Call of the Wild", by Die Toten Hosen from Unsterblich
- "Call of the Wild", by Heart from Brigade
- "Call of the Wild", by Heltah Skeltah from Magnum Force
- "Call of the Wild", by Jimi Tenor, covered by GusGus from Attention
- "Call of the Wild", a 1979 single from Lindisfarne
- "Call of the Wild", a 1985 single by Midge Ure
- "Call of the Wild", by Peter Frampton from Premonition
- "Call of the Wild", by Pitbull from Pitbull Starring in Rebelution
- "Call of the Wild", by Roxette from Pearls of Passion
- "Call of the Wild", by Saxon from Innocence Is No Excuse
- "Call of the Wild", by the Tom Tom Club from Boom Boom Chi Boom Boom
- "The Call of the Wild" (song), a 1993 song by artist Aaron Tippin
- "The Call of the Wild", by Alan Parsons from The Time Machine (Alan Parsons album)
- "The Call of the Wild", by David Byrne from Rei Momo
- "Call of the Wild", by Viagra Boys from the 2017 EP of the same name

== Other uses in arts, entertainment, and media ==
- Call of the Wild, a radio program hosted by Monstercat
- "The Call of the Wild", a poem by Robert W. Service
- theHunter: Call of the Wild, a 2017 videogame by Avalanche Studios Group
