= Skylar Kergil =

American singer-songwriter

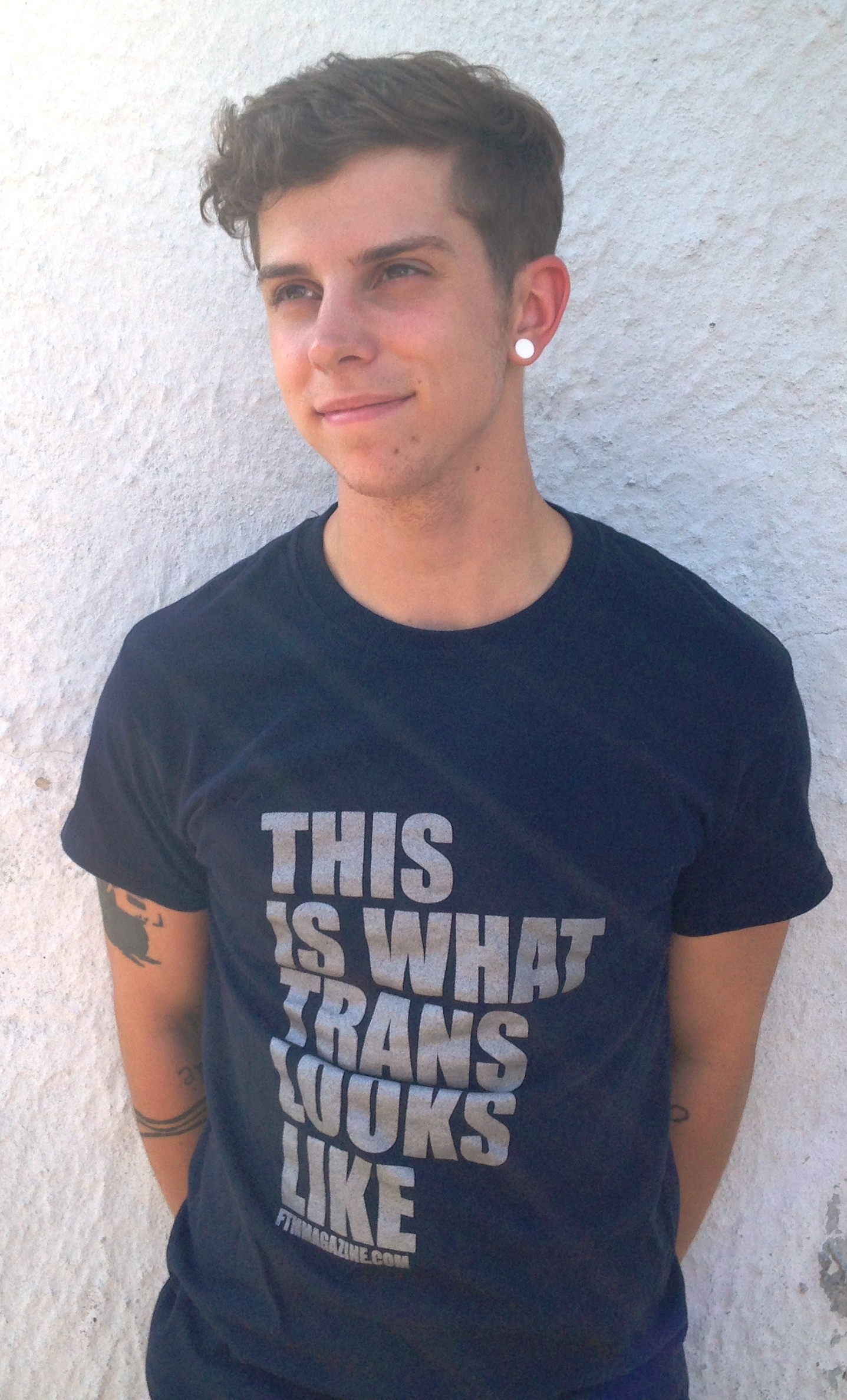
- Kergil in 2015
- Occupations: Vlogger; singer-songwriter

YouTube information
- Channel: skylarkeleven
- Years active: 2009–present
- Subscribers: 108 thousand
- Views: 12.2 million
- Last updated: February 25, 2025
- Website: skylarkergil.com

Skylar Kergil (skylarkeleven on YouTube) is an American YouTube personality and singer-songwriter.

== Personal life ==
Growing up, Kergil presented himself as a tomboy, and associated with a butch lesbian group in high school, cutting his hair and wearing baggy clothes, and playing in a punk rock band. At age 15, Kergil met a trans woman, which led Kergil to realize he was a trans man. Over the next several years, Kergil met with a gender therapist and started going by a gender-neutral name. He later came out to his parents as trans, and began taking testosterone in early 2009, his senior year of high school, in order to attend Skidmore College presenting as a man.

== Career ==
Kergil has been documenting his transition from female-to-male on YouTube since 2009 to educate viewers about gender identity, gender-affirming procedures, and his life as a trans man.

In 2015, Kergil featured on the first episode of PBS's First Person series, an LGBTQ-themed web series, as well as in a Transgender Today editorial from The New York Times. He was awarded the "Youth Innovator Award" by the Trevor Project in 2014.

Kergil's music style has been described by Billboard as "a folk sound that sends a statement".
