= Lost on You =

2015 song by LP

- One of the various artworks used to digitally commercialize "Lost on You" worldwide

Single by LP

from the album Death Valley and Lost on You
- Released: November 20, 2015
- Genre: Indie rock; folk rock
- Length: 4:26
- Label: Vagrant
- Songwriters: LP; Michael Gonzales; Nate Campany; Erick Landero
- Producers: Nate Campany; Mike Del Rio

LP singles chronology
"Muddy Waters" (2015)	"Lost on You" (2015)	"Other People" (2016)

"Lost on You" is a song recorded by American recording artist LP (Laura Pergolizzi). It was released on November 20, 2015, as the second single from their third EP, Death Valley and the fourth studio album of the same name (2016). The song experienced commercial success, mostly in Central and Eastern Europe and Western Asia, and topped the charts of thirteen countries.

The single was certified quadruple Platinum by the Federation of the Italian Music Industry for sales exceeding 200,000 units. By November 2018, "Lost on You" received a release as a single in Mexico to much success. It was among the most-played songs on Top 40 radio stations in the country, mainly popular in Mexico City. In 2023, the song was included in the soundtrack of the Brazilian telenovela Terra e Paixão.

== Background ==
Being about a failed relationship in their life, LP wrote the song after realizing that their girlfriend was not going to be their partner anymore. "I felt like my lover was drifting away – slowly leaving the building – and there was nothing that I could do," they stated. "It's a breakup song, but it happened almost a year before we broke up, and it was kind of like, 'Hey, do you see what's happening? Is it lost on you that this is going to die?' And then it did." The song was misconstrued, according to LP, although they did not mind it. "People would make it that it was romantic, like, I'm lost on you...Like it's about being lost being in love with you, and that's not really what 'Lost On You' is about. That's the beauty of songs."

== Composition ==
Lasting 4 minutes and 26 seconds, the midtempo song is described as having "a really laid-back vibe, no beats and no rapping...just some strange wailing which sounds like an animal in its death throes, alone somewhere on the bleak tundra, with only the darkness of winter for company." Forbes called the song "an anthem, a juggernaut..." Toronto Star described it as a "post-breakup arena-folk anthem" and The Brag Media described it as a "southern-infused, ukulele-blues, whistling cry from a broken heart".

The song is written in the key of F minor, with a shuffle rhythm, and has a tempo of 86 beats per minute. LP plays ukulele during the course of the song, in addition to intermittent whistles.

== Reception ==
Forbes praised the song as being "a cry from a broken heart watching the fading embers of a dying love... It is a break-up song that has resonated with millions of people all over the world...It is resigned and hopeful, fragile and strong; the intimate lyrics and stadium-sized chorus capture the emotional rollercoaster of a heartbreak." Rachael Scarsbrook from Renowned For Sound said the song "is reserved yet nuanced enough to strike a real connection between artist and listener." Michelle Blakey from The Lesbian Review describes 'Lost on You' as "a deeply emotional song chronicling the demise of a relationship...It climbs steadily toward a chorus in which her voice erupts into an injured rage...It is a gut-wrenching song that anyone who has ever felt betrayed by a loved one can relate to."

=== Success ===
Although the song was released in November 2015, with the singer already playing the song to various record companies, it did not initially achieve any chart success. In May 2016, however, the song managed to jump to number one in the Greek charts. The song held this top position for 18 weeks, making it the most successful song of the year in Greece. Billboard said the reason for their success was that many vacationers heard their music on the beach and the song was then able to spread across Greece over the summer months. At the end of June 2016, the song also reached the French and Italian charts. In France, the title also reached the top position. In Italy, the song peaked in the top 5 and stayed in the top 10 of the singles chart for over three months. The song was also the fourth most Shazamed song in the world. Regarding its success in Greece, Panagiotis Loulourgas, head of international and A&R manager at the Greek record label Cobalt Music, said it was due to "the feeling of the track, it’s everything. It touches you". In Russia the "Lost on You" Swanky Tunes & Going Deeper Remix was No. 12 on the iTunes sales chart.

After the song became a huge hit in Europe, LP stated "...I was already fuckin' 30 to 40 songs away in my writing. I get these interviews that are very kind and in awe of the whole thing and they'll be, like, 'You must have known it was a huge hit when you wrote it.' And I didn’t know shit. I was on Warner Brothers, they got new people in who didn't like me, who didn't sign me, who didn't care, and they basically said 'Hey, come in and play us your new shit, so we can decide if we want to keep you on the label." LP says that although they still have the scars of the breakup, they are very proud of the song's success.

LP appeared in Christian Louboutin's presentation at Paris Fashion Week in 2024 and sang "Lost On You".

== Music video ==
In the music video, LP alternates with a red-haired woman. The woman is photo model Laura Hanson Sims. LP knows her privately, but has no close relationship with her. LP often looks yearnful in the music video and drinks to get over the grief, thus representing their own character. LP's girlfriend Lauren Ruth Ward can be seen kissing LP passionately in the final seconds of the video. Also featured in the video is LP's band member, bassist Brian Stanley.

== Charts ==
=== Weekly charts ===
2016–2017 weekly chart performance
Chart (2016–2017)	Peak position
Austria (Ö3 Austria Top 40)	4
Belgium (Ultratop 50 Flanders)	18
Belgium (Ultratop 50 Wallonia)	1
Bulgaria Airplay (National Top 40)	1
CIS Airplay (TopHit) Swanky Tunes & Going Deeper Remix	1
Croatia International Airplay (Top lista)	5
Czech Republic Airplay (ČNS IFPI)	1
Czech Republic Singles Digital (ČNS IFPI)	24
France (SNEP)	1
Germany (GfK)	42
Germany Airplay (BVMI)	20
Greece Airplay (IFPI)	1
Greece Digital Song Sales (Billboard)	1
Hungary (Dance Top 40)	6
Hungary (Rádiós Top 40)	2
Hungary (Single Top 40)	4
Israel International Airplay (Media Forest)	1
Italy (FIMI)	5
Latvia (Latvijas Top 40)	3
Lebanon (Lebanese Top 20)	16
Luxembourg Digital Song Sales (Billboard)	2
Netherlands (Airplay Top 50)	16
Netherlands (Dutch Top 40)	26
Netherlands (Single Top 100)	72
Poland Airplay (ZPAV)	1
Poland Dance (ZPAV)	1
Portugal (AFP)	65
Romania (Airplay 100)	1
Romania Airplay (Media Forest)	2
Romania TV Airplay (Media Forest)	1
Russia Airplay (TopHit) Swanky Tunes & Going Deeper Remix	1
San Marino Airplay (SMRTV Top 50)	2
Scottish Singles Sales (Official Charts)	36
Slovakia Airplay (ČNS IFPI)	1
Slovakia Singles Digital (ČNS IFPI)	13
Slovenia Airplay (SloTop50)	1
Spain (Promusicae)	60
Sweden Heatseekers (Sverigetopplistan)	5
Switzerland (Schweizer Hitparade)	5
Switzerland (Media Control Romandy)	1
Turkey International Airplay (MusicTopTR)	1
Ukraine Airplay (TopHit) Swanky Tunes & Going Deeper Remix	1
UK Singles Downloads (OCC)	38
US Alternative Airplay (Billboard)	34
US Adult Alternative Airplay (Billboard)	4
US Adult Pop Airplay (Billboard)	26

2019 weekly chart performance
Chart (2019)	Peak position
Mexico Anglo Airplay (Monitor Latino)	11

2025 weekly chart performance
Chart (2025)	Peak position
Israel International Airplay (Media Forest)	9

2026 weekly chart performance
Chart (2026)	Peak position
Ukraine Airplay (TopHit)	68

=== Year-end charts ===
Chart (2016)	Position
Belgium (Ultratop Flanders)	99
Belgium (Ultratop Wallonia)	37
CIS (Tophit)	7
Hungary (Single Top 40)	38
Israel International Airplay (Media Forest)	7
Italy (FIMI)	29
Poland (ZPAV)	10
Russia Airplay (Tophit)	7
Switzerland (Schweizer Hitparade)	54
Ukraine Airplay (Tophit)	27
Chart (2017)	Position
Belgium (Ultratop Wallonia)	44
Hungary (Rádiós Top 40)	18
Hungary (Single Top 40)	20
Israel International Airplay (Media Forest)	11
Latvia Airplay (LaIPA)	53
Slovenia Airplay (SloTop50)	4
Switzerland (Schweizer Hitparade)	62
Chart (2018)	Position
Hungary (Rádiós Top 40)	61
Hungary (Single Top 40)	91
Slovenia (SloTop50)	38
Chart (2022)	Position
Hungary (Rádiós Top 40)	40
Chart (2023)	Position
Hungary (Rádiós Top 40)	49
Chart (2024)	Position
Hungary (Rádiós Top 40)	73
Chart (2025)	Position
Belarus Airplay (TopHit) Swanky Tunes and Going Deeper Remix	149

== Certifications ==
Region	Certification	Certified units/sales
Austria (IFPI Austria)	Gold	15,000^{‡}
Belgium (BRMA)	Gold	10,000^{‡}
Brazil (Pro-Música Brasil)	3× Platinum	180,000^{‡}
Denmark (IFPI Danmark)	Gold	45,000^{‡}
France (SNEP)	Diamond	233,333^{‡}
Germany (BVMI)	Gold	200,000^{‡}
Greece (IFPI Greece)	Platinum	6,000^{^}
Italy (FIMI)	4× Platinum	200,000^{‡}
New Zealand (RMNZ)	Gold	15,000^{‡}
Norway (IFPI Norway)	Platinum	60,000^{‡}
Poland (ZPAV)	Platinum	20,000^{‡}
Portugal (AFP)	Gold	5,000^{‡}
Spain (Promusicae)	2× Platinum	80,000^{‡}
Switzerland (IFPI Switzerland)	Platinum	30,000^{‡}
United Kingdom (BPI)	Silver	200,000^{‡}
Streaming
Greece (IFPI Greece)	Platinum	2,000,000^{†}
Sweden (GLF)	Platinum	8,000,000^{†}
^{^} Shipments figures based on certification alone.^{‡} Sales+streaming figures based on certification alone.^{†} Streaming-only figures based on certification alone.

== See also ==
- List of Airplay 100 number ones of the 2010s
