= FTM Magazine =

American transgender magazine

- First issue: January 2014
- Country: United States of America
- Based in: Albany, New York
- ISSN: 2377-7737
- OCLC: 904603486

FTM Magazine is a company founded in Rochester, New York, then based in Albany, New York, that specifically represented FTM (female to male) trans men. It aimed to be a medium for trans masculine people to read other people's stories and encourage people to share their own. Popular topics included fashion, fitness, community stories, interviews, tips, and reviews.

== History ==
FTM Magazine was co-founded by Jason Robert Ballard and Leo Reichstetter. It was initially funded through Kickstarter in November 2013, and the first issue was published in 2014. Ballard ran the company independently for the first three years.

In April 2015, the magazine released a photo of model Aydian Dowling recreating the famous Adam Levine mostly-nude photo which was featured in the Cosmopolitan (UK) for testicular and prostate cancer awareness. As a result of this photo's popularity, the magazine launched their clothing line, called This Is What Trans Looks Like.

The October 2017 issue was postponed due to some backlash for being a binary exclusive company, and a funding deficit.

In 2017, FTM Magazine launched Trans Men Magazine, a downloadable magazine with monthly topics, horoscopes, and an advice column.

In 2018, Aidan Faiella took over as CEO of the company.

The magazine stopped publishing online after March 2020. As of July 2025, the official website no longer exists.

=== Issues ===
Date	Theme	Cover Model
Spring of 2014	The Founding Issue	Jason Robert Ballard
Summer 2014		Giovanni Carlo
Fall 2014	The YouTube Issue	Skylar Kergil
Winter 2015	Bodybuilding	Shawn Stinson
Spring 2015	Viral Photo	Aydian Dowling
Summer 2016	Web Series	Seven King, Emmett Jack Lundberg, and Jake Graf
Fall 2016	Documentary: Transgender, At War And Love	Logan Ireland
Winter 2016		Laith Ashley
Spring 2017		Tiq Milan
Summer 2017		Malcolm Rene Ribot
Summer 2018		Hanson Gobron
Fall 2018		Sir Knight

=== Articles ===
The founder of FTM Magazine is Jason Robert Ballard. Ballard published an autobiographical article on The New York Times website and wrote about his personal experiences as a trans man. He said his inspiration for the magazine stemmed from the support he received from his own family and friends. He also acknowledged that there is a long way to go as far as visibility and normalization of trans people in the eyes of the public and the media.

On June 23, 2014, an article written by Mitch Kellaway entitled ‘LOOK: Will This Magazine Become the GQ of Trans Men?’ was published on the Advocate website. The article includes an interview in which Ballard discusses his vision for the magazine, and says he noticed that the initial idea came while he was reading GQ magazine, hence the title of the article.

== Personnel ==
- Jason Robert Ballard - Founder of FTM Magazine
- Aidan Faiella - CEO of FTM Magazine
- Chris Rhodes - Founder of Flavnt, trans clothing company.
- Mason Fitzpatrick - Staff Writer for Trans Men Magazine
- Rory Q. Kelling - Staff Writer for Trans Men Magazine
- Coach Cody - Staff Writer for Trans Men Magazine
- Transformation Coach Cody - Staff Writer for Trans Men Magazine
- Isaac Volbrecht - Staff Writer for Trans Men Magazine, Monthly Horoscopes
- Malcolm R Ribot - FTM Traveler
- Dani Farrell - Writer for FTM Magazine. Founder of Trans In Color and TBuddy.
- Maxwell Hunter
- Dash Hudson
- Guest Writers - Many of the articles published in FTM Magazine are written by guest writers. There are open submissions for guest writers to submit their writing, which is then edited and published.
