= Into the Wild (LP song) =

2012 single by LP

Single by LP

from the album Forever for Now
- Released: May 21, 2012
- Recorded: 2011
- Genre: Indie rock, indie pop, alternative rock
- Length: 3:53
- Label: Warner Bros. Records
- Songwriters: PJ Bianco, LP

LP singles chronology
"'Into the Wild' (Live)" (2012)	"Into the Wild" (2012)	"Night Like This" (2014)

"Into the Wild" is a break-through song by American indie rock recording artist LP. The song, which is best known for being featured in a Citibank commercial, was released as a single on May 21, 2012 through Warner Bros. Records. The song was also included on LP's third studio album, Forever for Now (2014).

== Citibank commercial ==
In the end of 2011, "Into the Wild" was prominently used in a Citibank ThankYou Card national TV ad campaign, featuring rock climbers Katie Brown and Alex Honnold. The song received vast exposure in the commercial, as it had millions of plays on YouTube. Both the commercial and the lyrics to the song were a subject of discussion: "Viewers of the commercial are almost as curious about the lyrics to the song", said Jeanne Moos on CNN.

== Music video ==
A music video for the song was shot at the Four Aces in Palmdale, California over the summer of 2012. Released onto YouTube on 4 October 2012, the video was directed by Shane Drake and features Brittany Snow and Haley Bennett.

== Track listing ==
No.	Title	Length
1.	"Into the Wild"	3:53

== Live version ==
"Into the Wild (Live)"

Single by LP

from the album Into the Wild: Live at EastWest Studios
- Released: 24 February 2012
- Recorded: 2011
- Length: 4:01
- Songwriters: PJ Bianco, LP

LP singles chronology
"Into the Wild (Live)" (2012)	"Into the Wild" (2012)

On February 24, 2012, a version of "Into the Wild" recorded in the historic EastWest Studios in Hollywood was released to promote LP's live EP. The Into the Wild: Live at EastWest Studios EP was released on April 24, 2012 through Warner Bros. Records.

=== Track listing ===
No.	Title	Length
1.	"Into the Wild" (Into the Wild: Live at EastWest Studios Version)	4:01
