= Mike Del Rio =

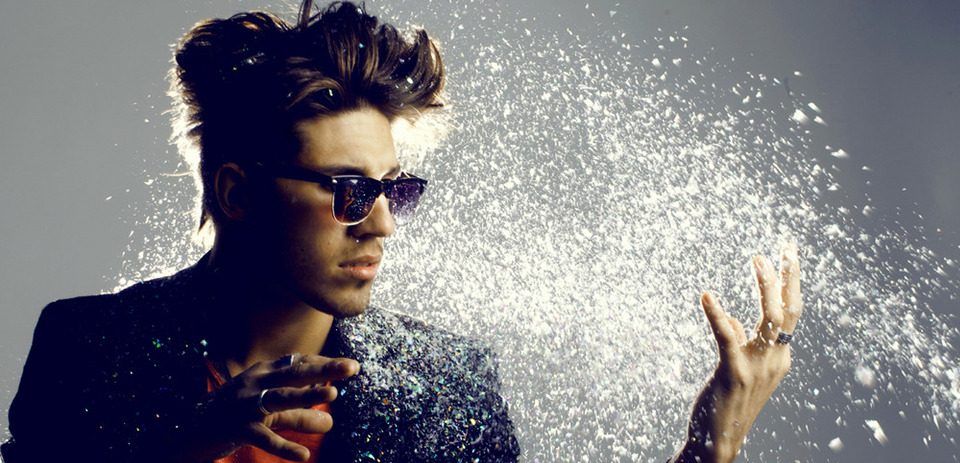

Background information
- Also known as: Michael Francis Gonzalez
- Born: March 8, 1990 (age 36); Queens, New York, U.S.
- Origin: New York, United States
- Genres: Pop, indie rock
- Years active: 2008–present
- Label: Republic Records / AWAL
- Website: www.MikeDelRio.com

Michael Francis Gonzalez (born March 8, 1990), also known by his stage name Mike Del Rio, is a musical artist, producer, and songwriter from New York, NY now based in Los Angeles, CA. He is the co creator and lead member of the alternative group POWERS along with songwriter, vocalist and instrumentalist Crista Ru signed to Republic Records. As a record producer, Del Rio's eclectic style and musicality has led him to work with an array of artist such as Kylie Minogue, Selena Gomez, Eminem, Christina Aguilera, CeeLo Green, Cheryl Cole, The Knocks, Skylar Grey, Jamie N Commons, Mylene Farmer and X Ambassadors. Del Rio executive produced recording artist LP global multi platinum album Lost on You containing the global hit title track "Lost on You". He was signed to Alex Da Kid's publishing company KidinaKorner distributed through Universal Music Group.

Del Rio is one half of RIO KOSTA.

== POWERS ==
Together with Crista Ru, he also is part of the alternative duo POWERS, which they started in late 2013. The band is signed to Republic Records.

== RIO KOSTA ==
Started in 2022, Del Rio in partnership with Kosta Galanopoulos started the project RIO KOSTA.
