= PJ Bianco =

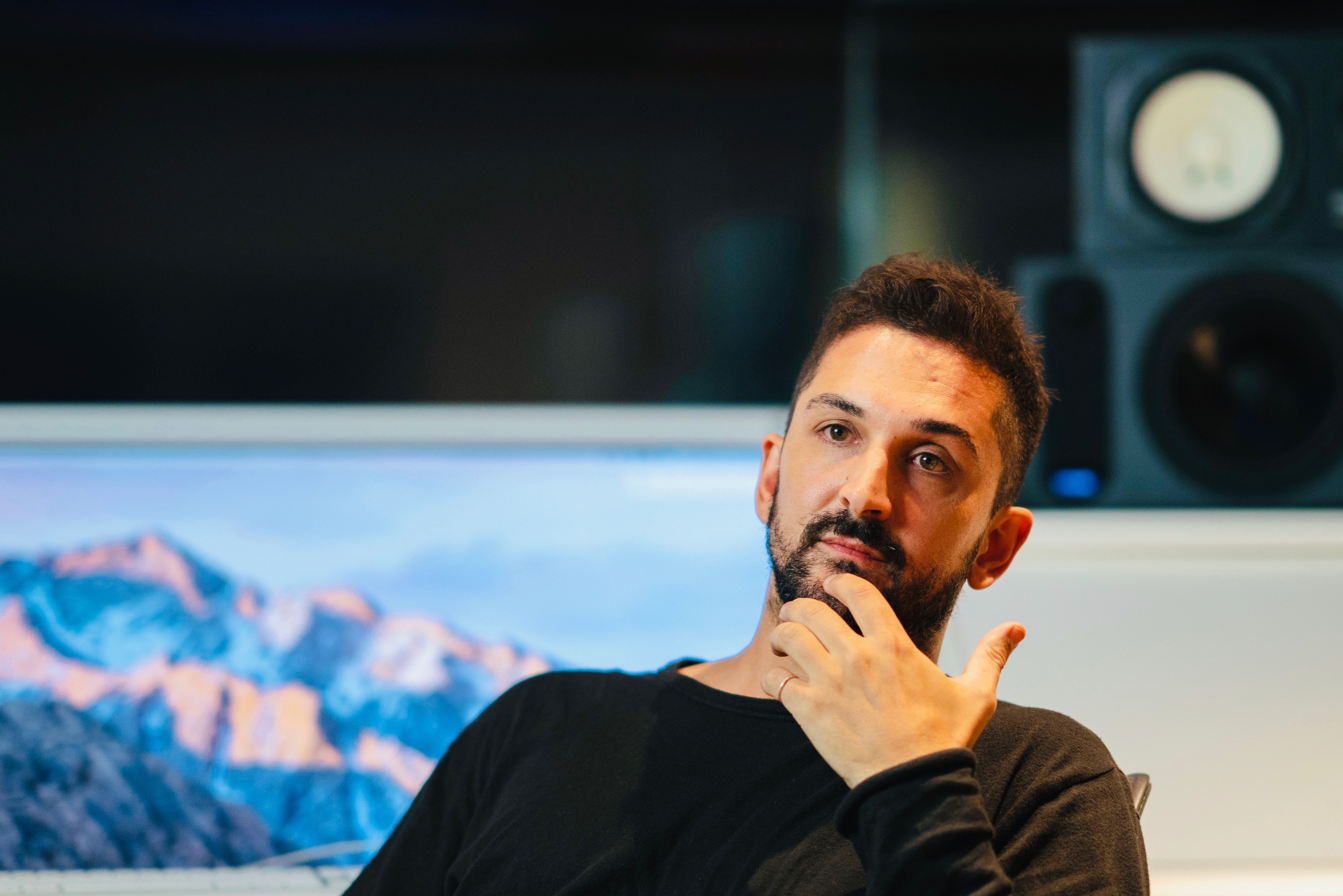
- PJ Bianco in 2019

Background information
- Born: 1981 (age 44–45); Bronxville, New York, U.S.
- Genres: Pop, Alternative, pop rock, dance-pop, electropop, hip hop
- Occupations: Musician, record producer, songwriter
- Instruments: Guitar, drum kit, vocals, bass guitar, piano, electronic keyboard
- Years active: 2001–present

PJ Bianco (born 1981) is an American record producer and songwriter.

== Early life and education ==
Bianco earned a bachelor of fine arts in music from the Conservatory of Music at SUNY Purchase College in New York, where he studied composition. He interned with Quad Recording Studio and The Loft Recording Studio during his study period.

== Career ==
After graduating, Bianco signed with Denise Rich Songs and began working closely with songwriter and philanthropist Denise Rich to develop his skills as a lyricist. Later, Bianco began collaborating with the Jonas Brothers, for whom he produced and co-wrote "Time for Me to Fly" for their 2006 debut album It's About Time, which was featured in the film Aquamarine.

Bianco produced "Rear View Mirror" for recording artist Mýa, featuring Sean Paul, that was included on her album, K.I.S.S.

PJ gained recognition for his work in the early 2010s, and co-wrote "Stop the World" for Demi Lovato's U.S. Billboard 200 number one album, Here We Go Again. Bianco worked with Warner Bros. singer-songwriter and recording artist LP, producing and co-writing music for album Forever for Now. Bianco additionally co-wrote "Into the Wild" with LP, which became prominent when it was used in a Citibank's commercial. In 2018, Bianco co-produced "With or Without You" for Genesis Jones along with DJ Snake.

During his career, Bianco has written songs for musicians such as Arizona, Demi Lovato, Fifth Harmony, Jonas Brothers, LP, Metro Station, and Mýa. His produced music has been included in the Billboard Canadian Hot 100, Canada CHR/Top 40, Canada Hot AC, Billboard Hot Rock & Alternative, and the Billboard Dance/Mix Show Airplay.

Bianco is the founder of a studio that is based in Los Angeles.

== Discography ==
Songwriting and production credits

Title	Year	Artist(s)	Album	Credits	Written with	Produced with
Time For Me to Fly	2006	Jonas Brothers	It's About Time	Co-Writer	Jonas Brothers	-
	2007	The Veronicas	Single	Co-Writer, Producer	-	-
When You Look Me In The Eyes	2008	Jonas Brothers	A Little Bit Longer	Co-Writer	Raymond Boyd, Jonas Brothers	-
Can't Have You	2008	Jonas Brothers	A Little Bit Longer	Co-Writer	Nick Jonas	-
Us Against The World	2009	Mitchel Musso, Katelyn Tarver	Mitchel Musso	Co-Writer, Producer	Brian Malouf, Eddie Galan	Brian Malouf
Movin In	2009	Mitchel Musso	Mitchel Musso	Co-Writer	Eddie Galan, Sam Musso, Leland Grant, Steve Sundholm	Brian Malouf
Stop The World	2009	Demi Lovato	Here We Go Again	Co-Writer	Nick Jonas, Demi Lovato	-
Over You	2009	Honor Society	Fashionably Late	Co-Writer	Nick Jonas, Michael Bruno, Jason Rosen, Alexander Noyes	-
Magic	2009	Meaghan Martin	Wizards of Waverly Place	Producer	-	Ric Ocasek
YourBiggestFan	2010	Jonas Brothers	Jonas L.A.	Co-Writer, Producer	Jonas Brothers, China McClain	-
Last Time Around	2010	Nick Jonas & The Administration	Who I Am	Co-Writer	Nick Jonas, Greg Garbowsky	-
Vesper's Goodbye	2010	Nick Jonas & The Administration	Who I Am	Co-Writer	Nick Jonas.	-
In The End	2010	Nick Jonas & The Administration	Who I Am	Co-Writer	Nick Jonas, Greg Garbowsky	-
Where's My Angel	2010	Metro Station	Single	Producer	-	-
I'm Just Fine	2010	Olivia Somerlyn	Olivia Somerlyn EP	Co-Writer	Curt Schneider, Olivia Somerlyn	-
Rear View Mirror	2011	Mya, Sean Paul	K.I.S.S. Keep It Sexy & Simple	Producer	-	-
We're The Kids	2012	Parade of Lights	Born to Live, Born to Love	Co-Writer, Producer	Ryan Daly, Anthony Improgo	-
Into The Wild	2012	L.P.	Into the Wild	Co-Writer, Producer	L.P.	Jonathan Malone, Rob Cavallo
Tokyo Sunrise	2012	L.P.	Into the Wild	Co-Writer	L.P.	-
Who Are You	2013	Fifth Harmony	Better Together	Co-Writer, Producer	Julian Bunetta, Allyson Hernandez, Normani Hamilton, Dinah Hansen, Nasri Atweh, Karla Camila Cabello, Lauren Jauregui	
Me & My Girls	2013	Fifth Harmony	Better Together	Co-Writer, Producer	Allyson Brooke, Karla Cabello, Lauren Jauregui, Normani Kordei, Dinah Jane Hansen, Julian Bunetta, Beau Alexandrè Dozier, John Ryan	-
I Still Love You	2013	Metro Station	Middle of the Night EP	Co-Writer, Producer	-	-
Take You Home	2013	Metro Station	Middle of the Night EP	Co-Writer, Producer	-	-
Every Time I Touch You	2013	Metro Station	Middle of the Night EP	Co-Writer, Producer	-	-
Barcelona	2013	Metro Station	Middle of the Night EP	Co-Writer, Producer	-	-
Ain't Nobody Got Time For That	2013	Blush	Single	Co-Writer	Beau Dozier, Blush, Drew Ryan Scott	-
The Lost Get Loud	2014	Elektrik People	The Lost Get Loud	Co-Writer	Evan Caleb Robinson, Reid Alan Curby, Svend Lerche	-
Break This	2014	Elektrik People	The Lost Get Loud	Co-Writer	Evan Caleb Robinson, Reid Alan Curby, Svend Lerche	-
Lunatic	2014	Elektrik People	The Lost Get Loud	Co-Writer	Evan Caleb Robinson, Reid Alan Curby, Svend Lerche	-
Painted Gold	2014	Elektrik People	The Lost Get Loud	Co-Writer	Evan Caleb Robinson, Reid Alan Curby, Svend Lerche	-
I Love My Life	2014	Elektrik People	The Lost Get Loud	Co-Writer	Evan Caleb Robinson, Reid Alan Curby, Svend Lerche	-
The Girl Is Back In Town	2014	Chantal Claret	Single	Co-Writer	Chantal Claret	-
For You	2015	Genevieve	Show Your Colors	Co-Writer	Genevieve	-
Tonight	2015	Landon Williams	Single	Co-Writer, Producer	Landon Williams	Landon Williams
Smoke Signals	2015	The Golden Hippie, Badflower	Flowers on the Sun	Co-Writer	Marissa Renee Shipp, Eddie Jackson, Daniel Mestanza, Jordan Mcgraw	-
Dancing Glorious	2015	The Golden Hippie	Flowers on the Sun	Co-Writer	Marissa Renee Shipp, Eddie Jackson, Daniel Mestanza, Jordan Mcgraw	-
Coke + Mirror War	2015	The Golden Hippie	Flowers on the Sun	Co-Writer	Marissa Renee Shipp, Eddie Jackson, Daniel Mestanza, Jordan Mcgraw	-
Champagne Problems	2016	Nick Jonas	Last Year Was Complicated	Co-Writer	Nick Jonas, Jason Evigan, Sean Douglas, Jonathan Tucker	-
Conquer	2016	RIVVRS	Unfamiliar Skin	Co-Writer	Brandon Zahursky, Lee Ann Mccollum	-
Grave of Broken Dreams	2017	Mat Bastard	Loov	Co-Writer	Mat Bastard	-
Oceans Away	2017	A R I Z O N A	GALLERY	Co-Writer	David Labuguen, Nathan Esquite, Zachary Charles	-
Annie	2017	A R I Z O N A	GALLERY	Co-Writer	Dan Avery, David Labuguen, Nathan Esquite, Zachary Charles	-
Not a Single Day	2017	A R I Z O N A	GALLERY	Co-Writer	David Labuguen, Nathan Esquite, Zachary Charles	-
Brave Enough	2017	A R I Z O N A	GALLERY	Co-Writer	David Labuguen, Nathan Esquite, Zachary Charles	-
Running	2017	A R I Z O N A	GALLERY	Co-Writer	Ryan Pulford, David Labuguen, Nathan Esquite, Zachary Charles	-
Are You	2017	A R I Z O N A	GALLERY	Co-Writer	David Labuguen, Nathan Esquite, Zachary Charles	-
Watch Me	2017	Nick Jonas	Ferdinand (Original Motion Picture Soundtrack)	Co-Writer	Jonathon Tucker, Jason Evigan, Sean Douglas, Nick Jonas	-
Cross My Mind	2017	A R I Z O N A	GALLERY	Co-Writer	David Labuguen, Nathan Esquite, Zachary Charles	-
Up Against Me	2017	L.P.	Lost On You	Co-Writer	L.P.	-
Fangs	2017	Rey Pila	Fangs	Producer	-	Diego Solorzano
I Like It Like That	2017	VILLA, Landon Williams	I Like it Like That	Producer	-	-
Knifed	2017	VILLA, Elektrik People	Single	Producer	-	-
You Want It All	2017	L.P.	Single	Co-Writer, Producer	Mike Del Rio, Jonathan Malone, L.P.	Jonathan Malone
Nobody Else	2018	Axwell	Single	Co-Writer	Axel Hedfors, Johannes Klahr, Robert Thiele, Jr.William Denham	
The Wave	2018	R3HAB, Lia Marie Johnson	Single	Co-Writer	Fadil El Ghoul, Sophia Black, Lia Marie Johnson, Nicholas Audino, Lewis Hughes, Khales Rohaim	
Just The Same	2018	Charlotte Lawrence	Young EP	Co-Writer	MAG, Charlotte Lawrence, Louis Schoorl	-
Freaking Out	2018	A R I Z O N A	COLD NIGHTS // SUMMER DAYS	Co-Writer	David Labuguen, Nathan Esquite, Zachary Hannah	-
White Gold	2018	Landon Williams	Single	Co-Writer	Dan Book Joel Shifflet Landon Williams	
u never did that 4 me	2018	Sage Charmaine	Don't leave me	Co-Writer, Producer	Rocky Lynch	Rocky Lynch
What She Wants	2018	A R I Z O N A	COLD NIGHTS // SUMMER DAYS	Co-Writer	Madison Emiko Love, Zachary Hannah, Nathan Esquite, David Labuguen	-
Summer Days	2018	A R I Z O N A	COLD NIGHTS // SUMMER DAYS	Co-Writer	David Labuguen, Nathan Esquite, Ryan Pulford, Zachary Charles	
It Will Never Be Enough	2018	Vesperteen	The Hype Is Dead	Co-Writer, Producer	Vesperteen, Colin Rigsby	Vesperteen, Colin Rigsby
June	2018	Sage Charmaine	don't leave me	Co-Writer, Producer	Sage Charmaine	
Hold The Line	2019	Avicii, A R I Z O N A	Tim	Co-Writer	Andrew Jackson, David Labuguen, Lucas von Bahder, Nathan Esquite, Tim Bergling, Zachary Hannah	
Problems	2019	A R I Z O N A	ASYLUM	Co-Writer, Producer	Chord Overstreet, David Labuguen, Hanni Ibrahim, Jim Lavigne, Nathan Esquite, Patrick Patrikios, Zachary Charles	A R I Z O N A
Nostalgic	2019	A R I Z O N A	ASYLUM	Co-Writer, Producer	David Labuguen, James Abrahart, Jordan Johnson, Michael Pollack, Nathan Esquite, Oliva Holt, Stefan Johnson, Zachary Charles	A R I Z O N A
Let Me Know	2019	A R I Z O N A	ASYLUM	Co-Writer, Producer	David Labuguen, Jacob Torrey, Nathan Esquite, Tim McEwan, Zachary Charles	A R I Z O N A
Where You Are	2019	A R I Z O N A	ASYLUM	Co-Writer, Producer	David Labuguen, Jonny Price, Madison Love, Nathan Esquite, Zachary Charles	A R I Z O N A
Don't Leave	2019	A R I Z O N A	ASYLUM	Co-Writer, Producer	David Labuguen, Eric Ciano, Nathan Esquite, Zachary Charles	A R I Z O N A
Find Someone	2019	A R I Z O N A	ASYLUM	Co-Writer, Producer	David Labuguen, Nathan Esquite, Samuel Harris, Zachary Charles	A R I Z O N A
Trouble	2019	A R I Z O N A	ASYLUM	Co-Writer, Producer	David Labuguen, Jacob Torrey, Nathan Esquite, Zachary Charles	A R I Z O N A
Still Alive	2019	A R I Z O N A	ASYLUM	Co-Writer, Producer	Andrew Jackson, David Labuguen, Nathan Esquite, Zachary Charles	A R I Z O N A
I'll Be Waiting For You	2019	Valen	Winona Forever	Co-Writer	Valentina Mitzkat	
1984 (Infinite Jest)	2020	The Used	Heartwork	Co-Writer	John Feldmann, Dan Whitesides	-
I'm With You	2020	Neon Dreams	Single	Co-Writer	Adrian Morris, Corey LeRue, Frank Kadillac	-
People Are Strange	2020	Liv Strange	Single	Co-Writer, Producer	-	-
Good Love	2020	Elektrik People	Cruel World	Co-Writer, Producer	Svend Lerche	-
Something More	2020	Elektrik People	Cruel World	Co-Writer, Producer	Evan Robinson, Svend Lerche	-
More	2021	Huxlxy	More	Co-Writer, Producer	Joshua Williamson, Matthew Mcnulty	Joshua Williamson
Flavor of the Month	2022	Hailey Haus	Single	Co-Writer	Hailey Joy Trevino, David Burris, Natania Lalwani, Mirandy Glory	-
Longest I've Been Stoned	2022	SUMMER Rios	Single	Co-Writer, Producer	Abe Abraham, Summer Rios	-
Real Love	2022	Rioma, phem	Single	Producer	-	-
Rose Petals	2022	Rioma, SUMMER Rios	Single	Producer	-	JM
I'll Wait For You	2022	ayokay	Digital Dreamscape	Co-Writer	ayokay	-
Fever	2022	Kygo, Lukas Graham	Thrill Of The Chase	Co-Writer	Kygo, Lukas Graham	-
Pit of Friends	2022	Rioma	Single	Producer	-	Nissou Beat
Borrowed Time	2022	Gigi Rowe	Laura	Co-Writer, Producer	Gigi Rowe	-
Lonely Together	2022	Gigi Rowe	Laura	Co-Writer, Producer	Gigi Rowe	-
When The Time Comes	2022	Gigi Rowe	Laura	Co-Writer, Producer	Gigi Rowe	-
I'll Get Where I'm Going	2022	Gigi Rowe	Laura	Co-Writer, Producer	Gigi Rowe	-
Lips	2022	Gigi Rowe	Laura	Co-Writer, Producer	Gigi Rowe, Zachary Hannah	Zachary Hannah
Running From The Grave	2022	Gigi Rowe	Laura	Co-Writer, Producer	Gigi Rowe	-
I Don't Wanna Be Saved	2022	Gigi Rowe	Laura	Co-Writer, Producer	Gigi Rowe	-
Velvet	2022	Gigi Rowe	Laura	Co-Writer, Producer	Gigi Rowe	-
Somebody For Me	2022	Gigi Rowe	Laura	Co-Writer, Producer	Gigi Rowe	-
Vintage Dream	2022	Gigi Rowe	Laura	Co-Writer, Producer	Gigi Rowe	-
Rich Like Biebs	2022	Rioma, Youngin	Single	Producer	-	Nick Lee
