= Where Are You Now =

Where Are You Now may refer to:

- Where Are You Now? (novel), by Mary Higgins Clark, 2008
- Where Are You Now (Cerrone X), a 1983 album by Cerrone

== Songs ==
- "Where Are You Now" (2 Unlimited song), 1993
- "Where Are You Now" (Clint Black song), 1991
- "Where Are You Now" (Jimmy Harnen song), 1989
- "Where Are You Now" (Lost Frequencies song), 2021, featuring Calum Scott
- "Where Are You Now?" (Roxus song), 1991
- "Where Are You Now" (Trisha Yearwood song), 2000
- "Where Are You Now (My Love)", by Jackie Trent, 1965
- "Where Are Ü Now", by Jack Ü and Justin Bieber, 2015
- "Where Are You Now?", by Brandy from the Batman Forever film soundtrack, 1995
- "Where Are You Now", by Britney Spears from Oops!... I Did It Again, 2000
- "Where Are You Now", by Donna De Lory from Sky Is Open, 2006
- "Where Are You Now", by Honor Society from Fashionably Late, 2009
- "Where Are You Now?", by ItaloBrothers, 2008
- "Where Are You Now", by J. Holiday from Guilty Conscience, 2014
- "Where Are You Now", by Janet Jackson from Janet, 1993
- "Where Are You Now?", by Justin Bieber from My World 2.0, 2010
- "Where Are You Now?", by Michelle Branch from Hotel Paper, 2003
- "Where Are You Now", by Mumford & Sons from Babel, 2012
- "Where Are You Now", by Nazareth from their album Sound Elixir, 1983
- "Where Are You Now?", by Royal Blood from How Did We Get So Dark?, 2016
- "Where Are You Now", by Union J from Union J, 2013
- "Where Are You Now?", by Ian Van Dahl from Lost & Found, 2004

== See also ==
- WAYN (website) (an acronym for "Where Are You Now?"), a social networking website
- Where Are You (disambiguation)
