= Mood lighting =

Indoor lighting intended to influence state of mind

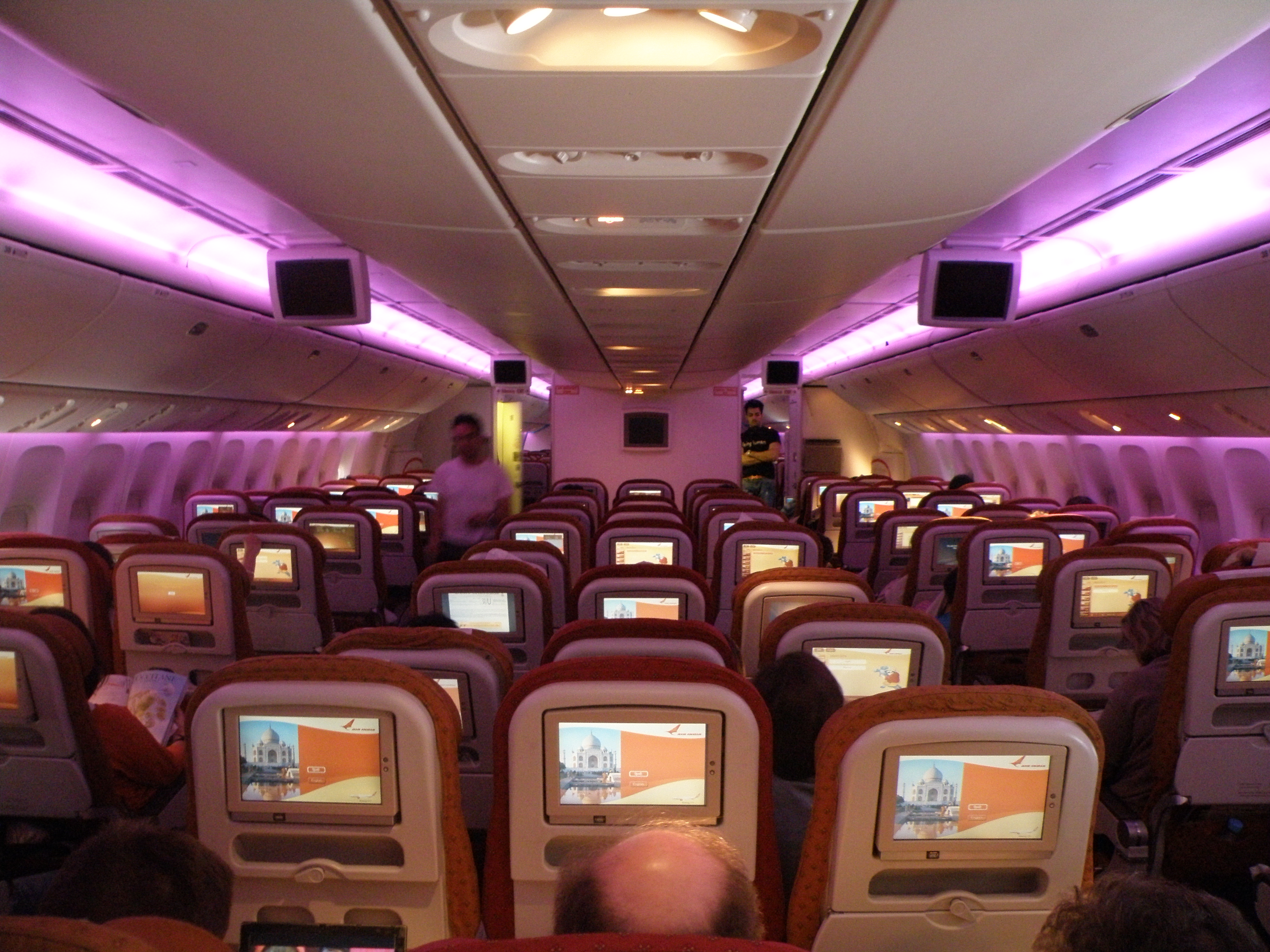
Mood lighting on an airplane

Mood lighting is the use of specific colours or brightness in ambient illumination with the intention of promoting a specific, temporary state of mind or feeling. While not specific to indoor settings, it is most commonly used in indoor environments.

== Use and effects on humans in indoor settings ==
Indoor lighting can have a variety of effects on human subjects living or working within an artificial indoor environment. A study with ninety-six subjects, ages ranging from 18 to 55, were examined on how a variety of lighting could impact their mood and cognition. Subjects showed higher problem-solving abilities for females in a warm vs. cool white light source. The opposite result was shown for the male subjects. Field studies have also shown that in office settings, blue-enriched lighting over the course of several weeks can lead to improved alertness, performance, and sleep quality in comparison to lighting with a lower color temperature.

A 2022 psychology study in China found that artificial lighting changes a person's perception of visual objects. Between the participants of the experiment, red and blue light reduced feelings of calmness and stability and increased feelings of irritation and nervousness, while green light reduces the feeling of pleasure and yellow light reduces irritated feelings. Another study states that "increasing evidence from both human and animal studies imply that a specialized class of retinal ganglion cells, intrinsically photosensitive retinal ganglion cells (ipRGCs), plays an important role in the light-regulated effects on mood and behavioral state." A study also found that among people working indoors, "it became evident that the light and colour of the workplace itself also had an influence on the mood of persons working there. The workers' mood was at its lowest when the lighting was experienced as much too dark. The mood then improved and reached its highest level when the lighting was experienced as just right, but when it became too bright the mood declined again."

Deliberate manipulation of ambient lighting is common in indoor or public places where a specific action is intended to be promoted. A common example is the use of ambient lighting in long-haul flights. In 2017, Qantas started Project Sunrise, a series of non-stop, ultra-long-haul flights from Australia's east coast to London and New York that would include in-plane features aimed at minimizing jetlag and improving customer wellbeing. After a series of research flights, Qantas and the University of Sydney attempted to research the optimal spectral irradiance of light in order to promote circadian adaption, sleep, and wake. The trial produced a series of 12 unique lighting scenes that would be used for project Sunrise flights with the 3 main ones being: Awake, blue lighting to dissuade tiredness among passengers; Sunset - an immersive transition from daytime mode into dark that gradually imitates the colors of a natural sunset into a night sky including moonlight and a snow effect; and Sunrise - a gradual transition from night to day. The lights were implemented, tested, and "adjusted for eye comfort and appearance" all with the intention of helping passengers adjust to their destination's time zone before their arrival, thus reducing or eliminating jet-lag. Australian Industrial designer David Coan stated that "aircraft lighting doesn’t cross the mind of most travelers, but the external light cycle of night and day has more impact on our circadian rhythm and the impact of jetlag than any other factor." Besides passenger wellbeing, the experiment also recorded crew and pilot energy and alertness levels in response to the changes in the ambient lighting. An article by Collins Aerospace states that "light is a key influence in the body’s regulation of the hormone melatonin, the release of which is directly correlated to the time of day and associated light exposure. Melatonin release increases during evening hours to promote sleep and decreases during daylight to encourage alertness – something that is lost when rapidly crossing multiple time zones in a jet." Electrical engineer Eric Johannessen also stated, “a specific blue wavelength that helps to keep us alert during the daytime is removed from the color mix during boarding. This simulates the low levels of light in the evening, allowing passengers to relax and fall asleep faster, even with all the lights on. This system then seamlessly adds the same blue wavelength light back to the color mixture prior to landing, ensuring passengers wake and arrive more rested and alert.” Today, most flights utilize various lighting scenes during food and drink service and rest periods.

Another common use of ambient lighting is in restaurants. For instance, fine dining restaurants and bars frequently use dim lighting, meanwhile brothels and strip clubs frequently use dim, red lighting, such as red-light districts. An article by the New York Times states that dim, red light offers a unique juxtaposition with the normalcy and brightness of outside ambience, thus it "embrace[s...] darkroom-core as a way to signal a transition to a nocturnal atmosphere." A customer at one red-light darkroom bar stated, "Red is easy on the eyes...It's fiery. It illuminates, but doesn't overwhelm." Even if the specific color of lighting may not have biologically wired effects, some specific colors in the present have gradually become associated with specific emotions, a phenomenon known as color symbolism. This includes red, which has become a symbol of various intense emotions, such as passion, anger, and danger, yet warmth at the same time. Other considerations on the impacts of ambient-lighting on mood include how dark lighting could increase anonymity, thus temporarily reducing social anxiety, promoting social interaction, risk-taking, and creativity. A psychological meta-analysis titled "Freedom from constraints: Darkness and dim illumination promote creativity" found that over six studies, darkness and dim illumination improved creative performance. Additionally, the studies demonstrated that darkness elicits a feeling of being free from constraints and triggers a risky, explorative processing style. The meta-analysis stated:

"In the dark or dim illumination, individuals experience less social control and need for compliance to social norms because their behavior is hidden in the dark... [D]arkness induces a sense of being anonymous and unobservable...Overall, dim light apparently creates a cozy atmosphere and induces a feeling of being free from social constraints...Second,...dark and dim lighting conditions also increase risky and disinhibited behavior in the form of prosocial and antisocial deviance from norms. Compared to a well lit room, participants in a dim room were more likely to cheat for their own benefit...However, in dim rooms, participants were also more likely to hug unknown people and disclose private information to others...All these behaviors can be seen as risky because people risk being caught committing negative transgressions and subsequently facing punishment."

== Types of mood lighting ==
Mood lighting can come in several variations ranging from ambient, natural, or artificial lighting. Below are a few examples:

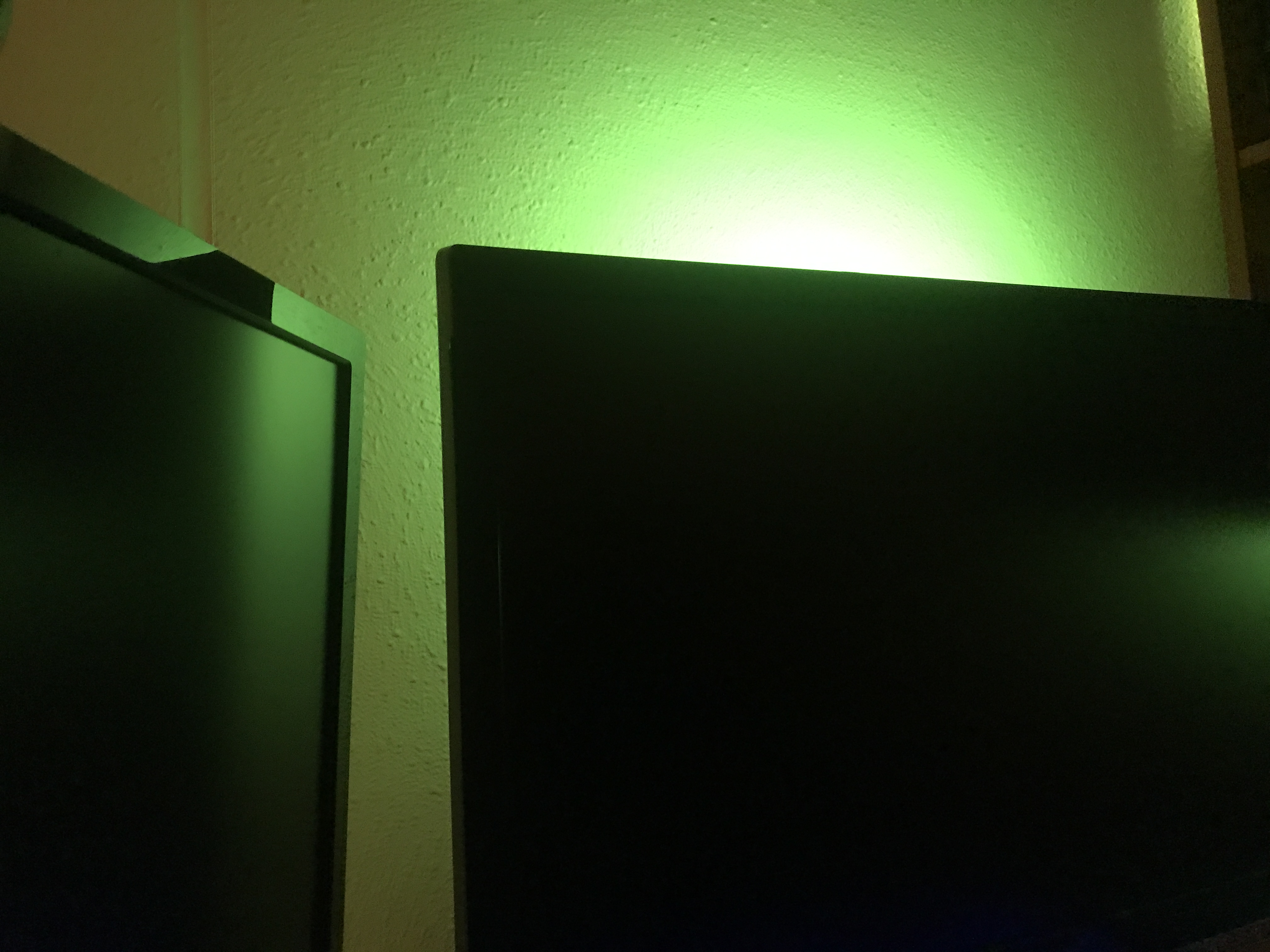
Green Mood Lighting

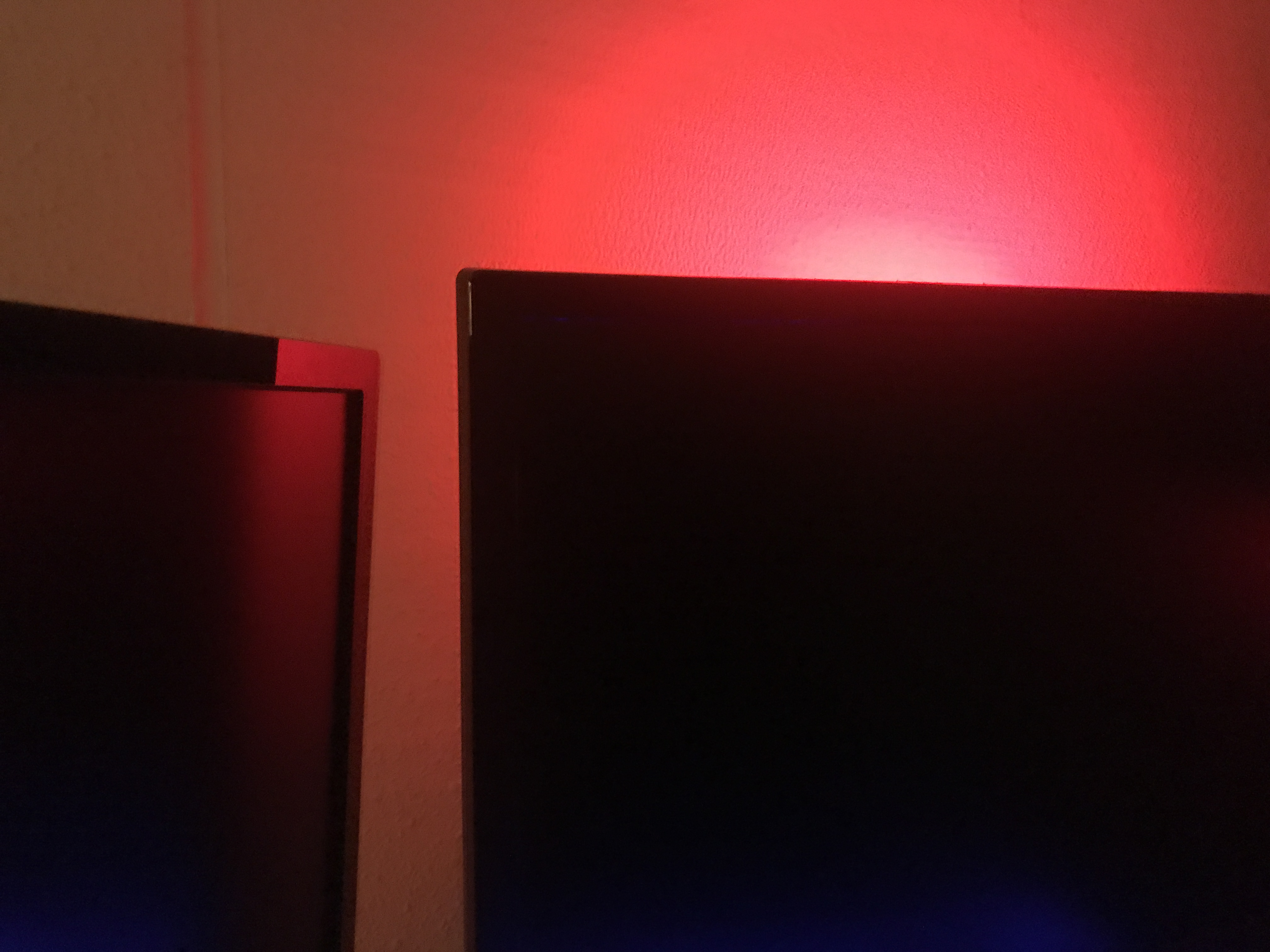
Red Mood Lighting

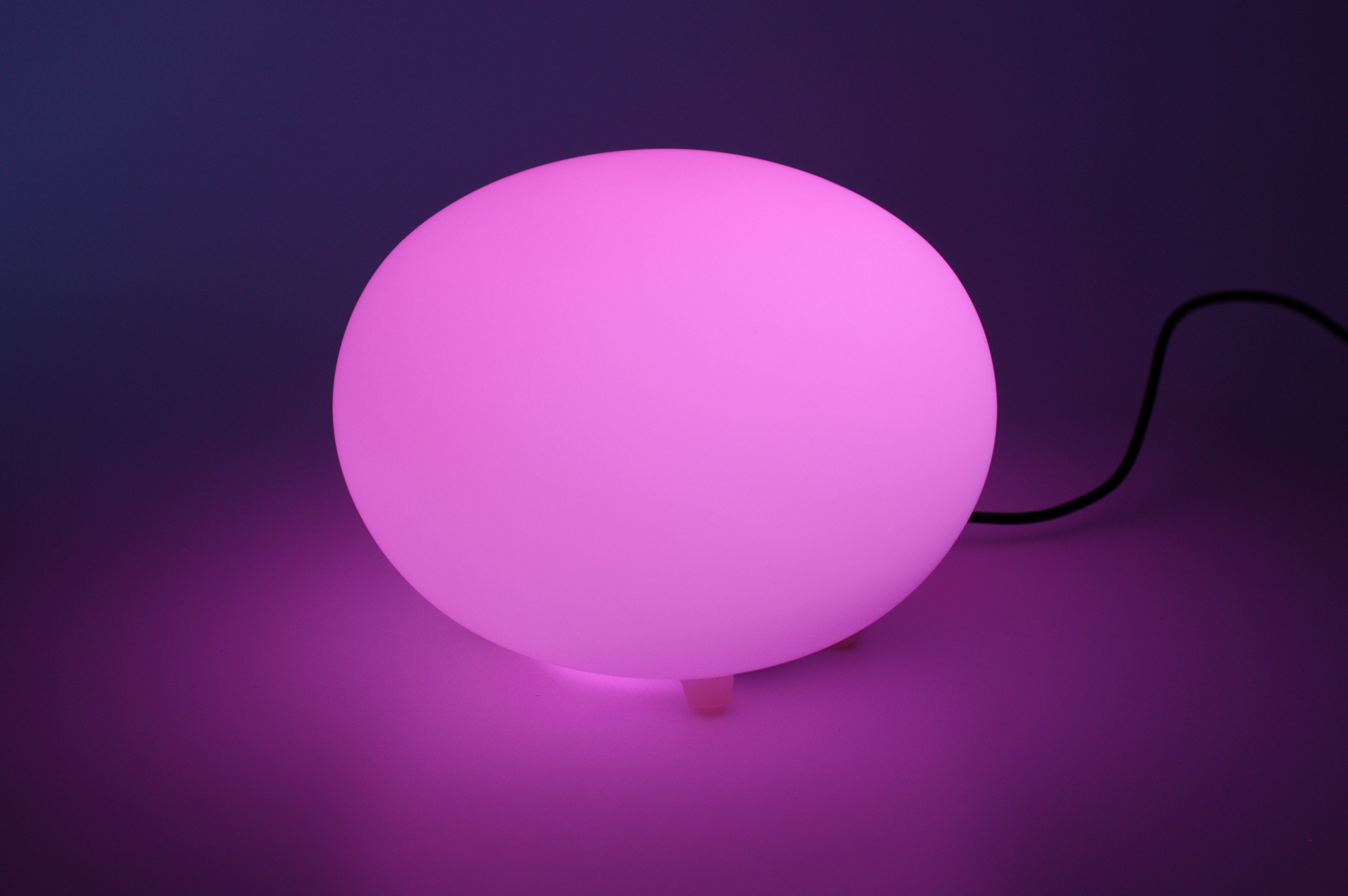
DIY magenta mood light
