= Where You Are =

Where You Are may refer to:

- Where You Are (album), by Socialburn, 2003
- "Where You Are" (CNBLUE song), 2012
- "Where You Are" (Jessica Simpson song), 2000
- "Where You Are" (Rahsaan Patterson song), 1997
- "Where You Are" (PinkPantheress song), 2022
- "Where You Are", a song by 50 Cent from the 2009 album Forever King
- "Where You Are", a 1928 song by Alice Faye
- "Where You Are", a 2010 song by Cali Swag District
- "Where You Are", a song by Gavin DeGraw from the 2011 album Sweeter
- "Where You Are", a song by Jay Sean from the 2013 album Neon
- "Where You Are", a 2023 single by Nico Santos and Fast Boy.
- "Where You Are", a song from the 2016 soundtrack Moana
- "Where You Are", a 2004 song by Rascal Flatts from Feels Like Today
- "Where You Are", a 2022 song by SM Town from 2022 Winter SM Town: SMCU Palace
- "Where You Are", a song by Whitney Houston from the 1987 album Whitney

== See also ==
- Where Are You (disambiguation)
