= Over You (Honor Society song) =

- Remix cover

Single by Honor Society

from the album Fashionably Late
- Released: September 15, 2009
- Genre: Pop rock
- Length: 3:04
- Label: Hollywood/Jonas
- Songwriters: Nick Jonas, PJ Bianco, Michael Bruno, Alexander Noyes, Jason Rosen, Andrew Lee Schmidt
- Producers: John Fields, Jonas Brothers

Honor Society singles chronology
"Where Are You Now" (2009)	"Over You" (2009)	"Full Moon Crazy" (2009)

"Over You" is a song by American pop rock band Honor Society. It is the opening and first single from their debut studio album Fashionably Late (2009), through Hollywood Records and Jonas Records. Nick Jonas of the Jonas Brothers and producer PJ Bianco contributed to the song as a songwriters. The music video was premiered on November 10, 2009, two months after the single debuted.

== Music video ==
The music video for "Over You" was directed by Shane Drake. The band shows performing in a train's dining car, while lead vocalist Michael Bruno follows a woman in a red dress. The video premiered on November 10, 2009 on JSYK.

== Reception ==
Sandra Gordon of Billboard noted that in the song's quieter moments, "inhale shifts to exhale and romantic frustration becomes fun", adding that if this is what a breakup sounds like, it might be worth the pain.

== Personnel ==
Credits are adapted from the Fashionably Late booklet.

Honor Society

- Michael Bruno – guitars, vocals
- Jason Rosen – guitars, backing vocals, keyboards
- Alexander Noyes – drums
- Andrew Lee – bass, backing vocals

Writing and production

- Nick Jonas – songwriter
- PJ Bianco – songwriter
- John Fields – producer
- Jonas Brothers – producer
