= Feeling Electric =

Studio album by Parade of Lights
- Released: June 2, 2015
- Genre: Electronic rock, electropop, indietronica
- Label: Astralwerks

Parade of Lights chronology
| Golden (2014) | Feeling Electric (2015) |

Singles from Feeling Electric
- 1. "We're The Kids" Released: June 13, 2013; 2. "Golden" Released: January 17, 2014; 3. "Feeling Electric" Released: April 22, 2015

Feeling Electric is the first studio album by electronic rock band Parade of Lights. It was released on June 2, 2015 via Astralwerks.

== Track listing ==
| No. | Title | Length |
|---|---|---|
| 1. | "////" | 0:48 |
| 2. | "Feeling Electric" | 3:42 |
| 3. | "Wake Up" | 3:12 |
| 4. | "Golden" | 3:05 |
| 5. | "Undefeatable" | 3:30 |
| 6. | "We're the Kids" | 2:57 |
| 7. | "Can't Have You" | 3:10 |
| 8. | "Silver and Gold" | 3:29 |
| 9. | "The Island" | 3:36 |
| 10. | "Burn" | 2:59 |
| 11. | "Memory" | 3:36 |
| Total length: | | 34:53 |

== Charts ==
| Chart (2015) | Peak position |
|---|---|
| US Top Dance/Electronic Albums (Billboard) | 24 |
