= Golden (EP) =

EP by Parade of Lights
- Released: March 25, 2014
- Recorded: 2012–2014
- Genre: Electronic rock; electropop; power pop; nu gaze; indietronica
- Length: 12:35
- Label: Astralwerks
- Producer: Ryan Daly, Anthony Improgo

Parade of Lights chronology
Born To Live, Born To Love (2012)	Golden (2014)	Feeling Electric (2015)

Singles from Golden
- 1. "We're The Kids" Released: June 13, 2013; 2. "Golden" Released: January 17, 2014

Golden is the second extended play by Californian electronic rock outfit, Parade of Lights. It was the band's first release on Astralwerks after previously self-releasing their previous extended play. The EP was released on March 25, 2014 to iTunes and Spotify.

== Track listing ==
No.	Title	Length
1.	"Golden"	3:04
2.	"We're The Kids"	2:57
3.	"The Island"	3:36
4.	"Burn"	2:58
Total length:		12:35

== Charting ==
Chart (2014)	Peak position
US Top Heatseekers Albums (Billboard)	44
