= Kahan Ho Tum =

Kahan Ho Tum (lit. 'Where Are You') may refer to:

- Kahan Ho Tum (film), a 2003 Indian Hindi-language thriller film by Vijay Kumar, starring Sharman Joshi, Samir Soni, Sonu Sood, Ishitta Arun and Shwetha Menon
- Kahan Ho Tum (TV series), a 2018 Pakistani TV series

== See also ==
- Where Are You (disambiguation)
