= Bandslam (soundtrack) =

Soundtrack album by Various artists
- Released: August 11, 2009
- Recorded: 2008–2009
- Genre: Soundtrack
- Length: 56:40
- Label: Hollywood

Singles from Bandslam
- 1. "Where Are You Now?" Released: July 21, 2009; 2. "Everything I Own" Released: July 21, 2009

Bandslam is the soundtrack album for Summit Entertainment's film of the same name. The soundtrack was released on August 11, 2009 through Hollywood Records.

Despite its good reviews, the soundtrack album failed to chart within the Billboard 200. The film failed to chart in the top 10 in the United States, grossing $12,231,273 on its opening weekend while distributed at 2,121 theatres.

== Album information ==
The soundtrack features tracks from the Burning Hotels, the Velvet Underground and David Bowie. Mitchell Leib, president of music and soundtracks at Walt Disney Pictures, describes the album as a "real music picture in a way Cameron Crowe would make a music picture".

== Track listing ==
No.	Title	Performer(s)	Length
1.	"Rebel Rebel"	David Bowie	4:30
2.	"Amphetamine"	I Can't Go On, I'll Go On featuring Aly Michalka	3:18
3.	"24 Hours"	Shack	4:12
4.	"Where Are You Now"	Honor Society	3:49
5.	"Lunar One"	Seventeen Evergreen	3:59
6.	"Femme Fatale"	The Velvet Underground & Nico	2:38
7.	"Twice Is Too Much"	Exist	4:15
8.	"Road"	Nick Drake	2:01
9.	"Someone to Fall Back On"	I Can't Go On, I'll Go On featuring Aly Michalka	4:16
10.	"I Want You to Want Me"	Aly Michalka	4:13
11.	"Pretend"	Scott Porter and the Glory Dogs	4:25
12.	"Stuck in the Middle"	The Burning Hotels	3:17
13.	"Blizzard Woman Blues"	The Daze	3:28
14.	"Everything I Own"	I Can't Go On, I'll Go On featuring Vanessa Hudgens	5:39
15.	"What Light"	Wilco	3:33

== Charts ==
Chart (2009)	Peak position
Irish Compilations Chart	15

== Critical reception ==
Professional ratings
Review scores
Source	Rating
AllMusic	3/5 stars
Entertainment Weekly	B

Entertainment Weekly's Leah Greenblatt praises Hudgens and Michalka's singing abilities in Bread's "Everything I Own" and Cheap Trick's "I Want You to Want Me", while Allmusic's Heather Phares remarks that "Bandslam tries to be and do a lot of things, and while it doesn't always succeed, it works well enough that fans of the movie (and their parents) won't be disappointed by the soundtrack." Michael Rechtshaffen wrote on his review, that the soundtrack is "authentic" and "eclectic".

== Personnel ==
The following people contributed to the album:

- Executive producer – Todd Graff
- Soundtrack producer – Lindsay Fellows
- Producers – John Fields, Adam Lasus, Joseph Magee, Jasmina Kopic
- Music supervisor – Lindsay Fellows
- Soundtrack director – Desirée Craig Ramos
- Music clearance – Christine Bergren
- Mixing – Paul David Hager, Joseph Magee
- Mastering – Patricia Sullivan
- Engineers – John Fields
- Liner notes – Todd Graff
- Design – Enny Joo

== Release history ==
Region	Date
Poland	August 10, 2009
United Kingdom	August 10, 2009
United States	August 11, 2009
Brazil	August 11, 2009
Netherlands	August 26, 2009
Italy	September 25, 2009
Germany	November 20, 2009
New Zealand	December 7, 2009
