= We're the Kids =

Single by Parade of Lights

from the album Golden and Feeling Electric
- Released: June 13, 2013
- Genre: Electronic rock; electropop; indietronica; power pop
- Length: 2:57
- Label: Astralwerks
- Songwriter(s): Ryan Daly, Anthony Improgo

Parade of Lights singles chronology
"We're the Kids" (2013)	"Golden" (2014)

"We're the Kids" is the debut single from Californian electronic rock band Parade of Lights. The single was released on June 13, 2013 as the lead-off single for the band's second extended play, Golden, as well as their 2015 debut album Feeling Electric.

It was the first song by the band to chart, reaching #41 in the Billboard Hot Dance Club Songs.

== Music video ==
The music video for "We're the Kids" was first released onto YouTube and Vevo on November 23, 2013. The video shows the band performing the song in a dark, abandoned house.

== Commercial performance ==
- Billboard Hot Dance Club Songs: 41
