= Honor Society (band) =

American pop rock band (2004–2013)

- Honor Society in 2008. From left to right: Noyes, Bruno, Schmidt, Rosen

Background information
- Origin: Rockland County, New York and Midland Park, New Jersey, U.S.
- Genre: Pop rock
- Years active: 2004–2013
- Labels: Walt Disney; Hollywood; Universal; Jonas; Republic
- Past members: Andrew Lee Schmidt; Michael Bruno; Alexander Noyes; Jason Rosen
- Website: honorsociety.com

Honor Society was an American pop rock band that formed in New York City in 2004. The band consisted of Michael Bruno (vocals/guitar), Jason Rosen (guitar/keyboard), Andrew Lee Schmidt (bass), and Alexander Noyes (drums); however from late 2012 Rosen was no longer a part of the band. They were previously signed to Jonas Records in affiliation with Hollywood Records but parted ways in 2011.

The band released its debut album Fashionably Late on September 15, 2009, including the first single "Over You". The album debuted at No. 18 on the Billboard 200. One of the notable singles from the album was "Where Are You Now", which became the band's most successful single and signature as a one-hit wonder especially in the Philippines, and the song included chart MYX International Top 20. October 2011, the band released their second album, A Tale of Risky Business: Part II. It debuted at No. 29 on the Independent Album charts. In September 2013, Bruno, Noyes and Schmidt announced that they would disband. The band was based in Midland Park, New Jersey.

== History ==
=== 2004–2008: First two EPs and career beginnings ===
Honor Society was formed in 2004, although Noyes was not yet a part of the band. In 2006, they released The Green Light EP (2006). The band released its second EP, A Tale of Risky Business in May 2008.

=== 2008–2010: Discovery, Fashionably Late, and Where Are You Now ===
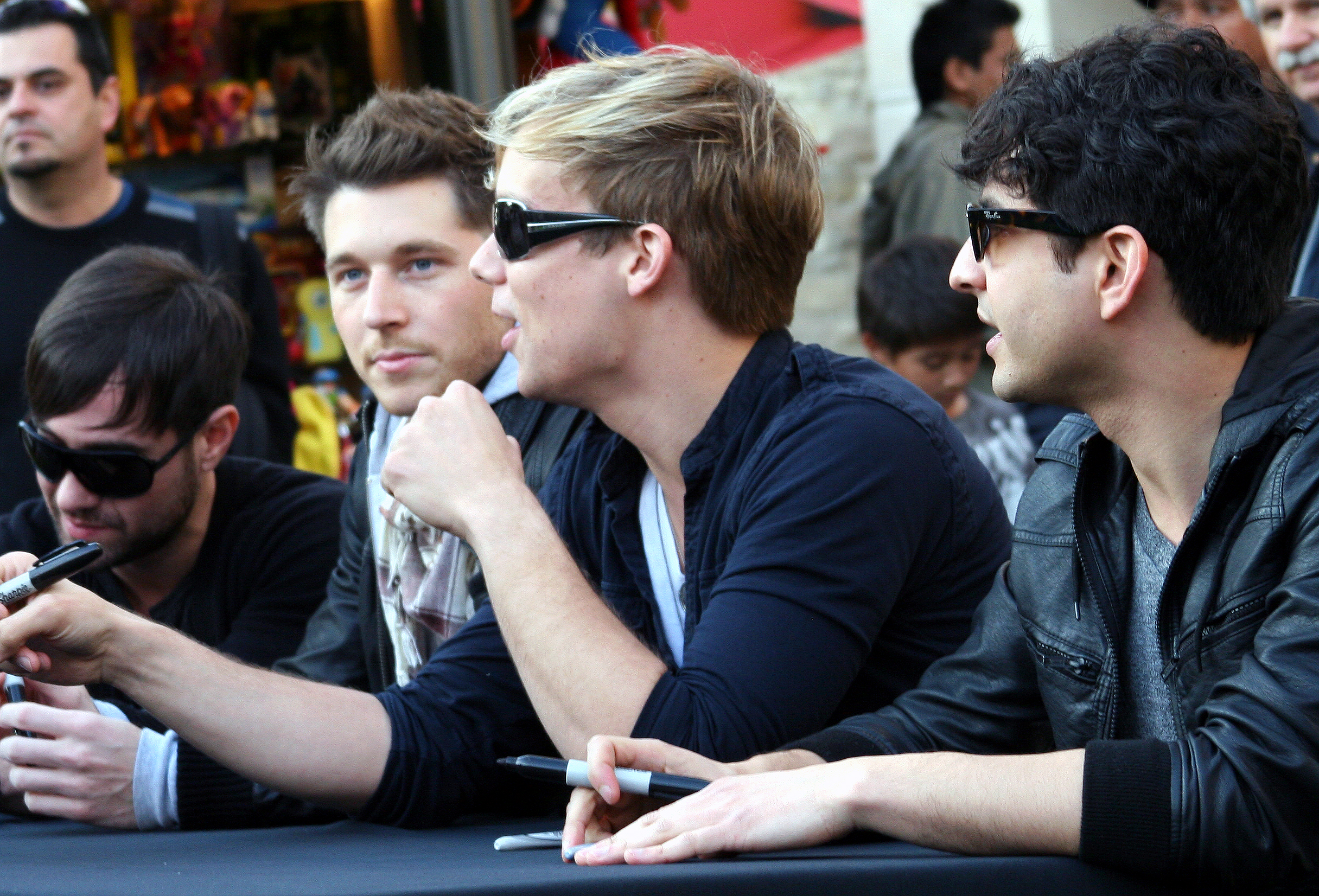
Honor Society at the Grove in Los Angeles on January 29, 2010

The Jonas Brothers discovered Honor Society in late 2008 and soon after signed them to the record label along with Hollywood Records. Since the Spring of 2009, Honor Society has been named one of the six breakout bands to watch by Rolling Stone Magazine. and identified as a Buzzworthy band by MTV.

Honor Society's debut album, Fashionably Late, was released on September 15, 2009. The band performed as an opening act on the Jonas Brothers World Tour 2009 and as headliners on the Fashionably Late Tour. The debut album reached No. 18 on the Billboard 200 in its first week.

On August 27, 2009, Honor Society uploaded a music video titled "Where Are You Now" and it became a big hit in the Philippines. The song is included in the American musical film Bandslam as soundtrack.

In Alvin and the Chipmunks: The Squeakquel, Honor Society performed "You Really Got Me" during the opening scene with the film's main characters.

On December 14, 2009, Honor Society rang the opening bell for the New York Stock Exchange.

In January 2010, Honor Society supported Timbaland on six dates on his Shock Value II Tour. Also the band performed in the National Anthem and later a musical performance at the 2010 National Scout Jamboree on July 31, 2010.

In the Fall of 2010, Honor Society started the #HONORsystem. Releasing several new songs for free downloaded at HonorSocietyMusic.com.

=== 2011–2013: A Tale of Risky Business: Part II, Serendipity, Rosen's departure and break–up ===
The band released their second full-length album, A Tale of Risky Business: Part II on October 25, 2011. The album spawned two singles: "Living a Lie" and "Hurricane". The album debuted on the Billboard 200 in the No. 133 position and No. 29 on the Independent Album charts. The following year, on September 18, 2012, they released their third EP, titled Serendipity. The title track was released as the lead single in July 2012.

In late 2012, lead guitarist, keyboardist and founding member Jason Rosen left the band on good terms. The band shared that the decision was mutual and expressed their support for Rosen's future endeavors. The remaining members continued as a trio until announcing their breakup in September 2013. They planned to finish their fan-funded documentary and soundtrack, along with a few farewell shows before officially ending their journey.

== Band members ==
Returns members

- Michael Bruno – lead vocals, guitar (2004–2013)
- Andrew Lee Schmidt – bass guitar, backing vocals (2004–2013)
- Alexander Noyes – drums, backing vocals (2006–2013)
- Jason Rosen – guitar, keyboards, backing vocals (2004–2012)

== Tours ==
=== Jonas Brothers World Tour 2009 ===
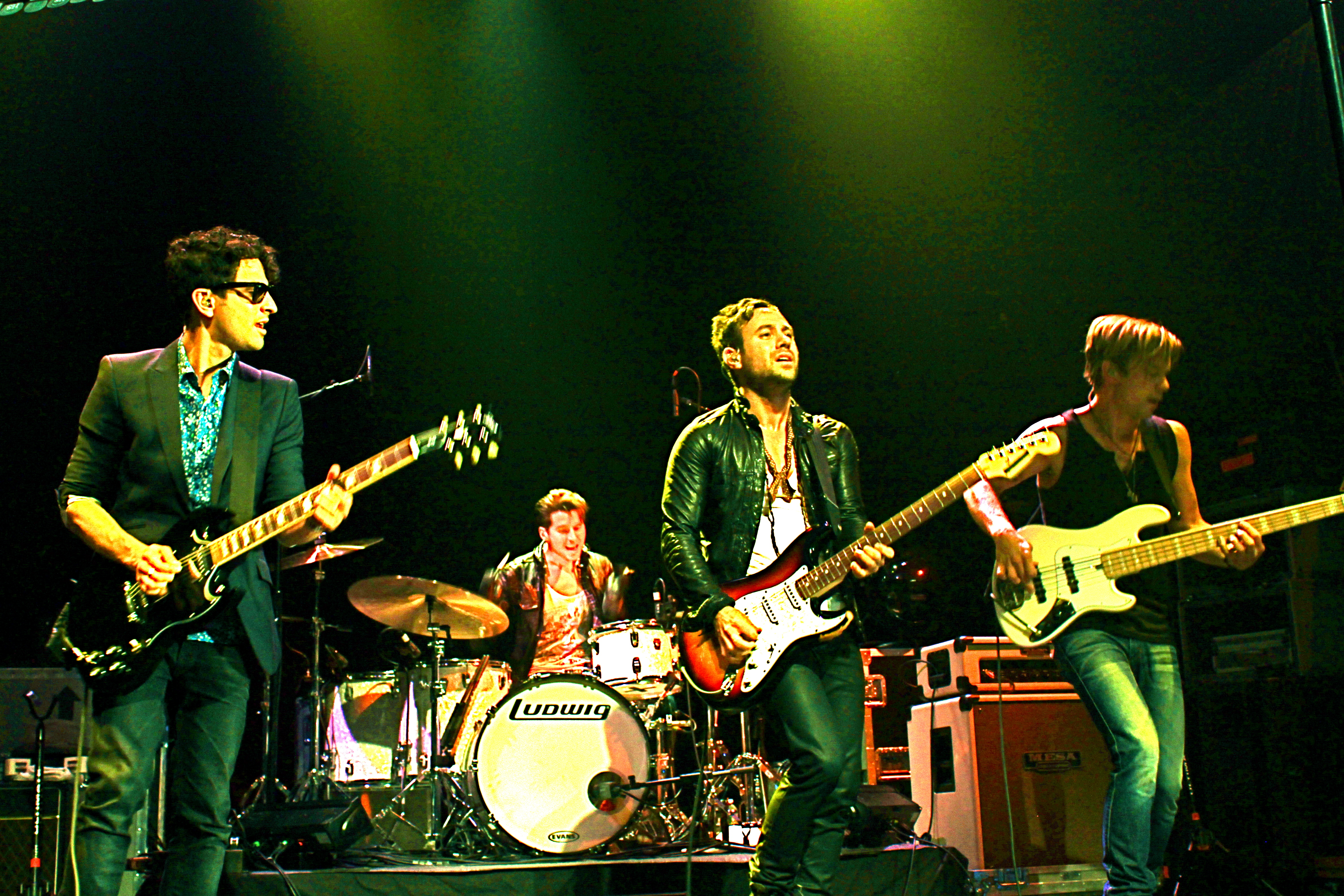
Honor Society at the Gramercy Theater in New York City on June 26, 2011

Honor Society's first national tour. They were an opening/supporting act on the Jonas Brothers' 2009 World Tour alongside Jordin Sparks and the Wonder Girls. During the tour, Honor Society also did its own headlining shows called "The Full Moon Crazy Tour." The tour became the 7th highest selling tour in 2009 after Britney Spears, Beyoncé, Madonna, U2, Justin Bieber, and Miley Cyrus.

=== Fashionably Late Tour ===
To support the release of its debut album, in September 2009, the band headlined the "Fashionably Late Tour," a 20 city tour through North America. YouTube Sensation Esmee Denters was a supporting and opening act on this tour.

=== Shock Value II Tour ===
In January 2010, Honor Society had the opportunity to open six shows on Timbaland's Shock Value II Tour. Special guests included: Justin Timberlake, Jay Sean, Katy Perry, and Miley Cyrus.

=== Here Comes Trouble Tour ===
Honor Society continued touring through the Spring of 2010 on their third headlining tour, the Here Comes Trouble Tour. It was a 32 city tour and featured Ashlyne Huff and Just Kait as the opening acts.

=== Wherever You Are Tour ===
After a year off the road, the band returned with its fourth national headlining tour called the "Wherever You Are Tour". It was a 22 city tour and featured Action Item and Katelyn Tarver as the opening act.

=== Rock the Red Kettle Tour ===
In the fall of 2011, Honor Society went back on tour headlining the Salvation Army's Rock the Red Kettle Tour. It was a 17 city tour that started in Orlando, Florida and ended in West Hollywood, California. It featured Sunderland, The Trace, and Aaron Camper as the opening acts.

=== Summer of Love Tour ===
Honor Society served as the supporting headliner on Allstar Weekend's Summer of Love Tour, which ran from July 24 to August 20, 2012.

=== Serendipity: The Tour ===
In Spring 2013, Honor Society went on an 18-date tour running from March 10 to April 13, including free shows at iPlay and Macy's stores and some private events.

== Television ==
At the beginning of 2010, the band performed on Jimmy Kimmel Live!. This episode was later cited as one of the highest rated of the show.

The band performed "Over You" and "See U in the Dark" on Skate for the Heart on January 31, 2010, that was aired on NBC.

The band performed the national anthem at the NFL Pro Bowl on January 31, 2010.

Honor Society sang the National Anthem at 6 baseball games in 2010 – San Francisco Giants on April 1, Kansas City Royals on April 7, Milwaukee Brewers on April 9, Detroit Tigers on April 11, Minnesota Twins on April 14 and New York Mets on April 23.

Alexander Noyes was featured on Kevin Jonas' When I Was 17 episode that aired on MTV. He talked about Kevin and their friendship while in high school.

The band was featured on MTV's 10 on Top at No. 6 in 2010.

The band appeared in an episode on the third season of MTV's Silent Library.

== Discography ==
=== Albums ===
- 2009: Fashionably Late
- 2011: A Tale of Risky Business: Part II

=== Extended plays ===
- 2006: The Green Light
- 2008: A Tale of Risky Business
- 2012: Serendipity

=== Singles ===
Year	Title	Peak chart positions	Album
Year	Title	US	Album
2009	"Where Are You Now"	—	Bandslam/Fashionably Late
2009	"Over You"	—	Fashionably Late
2009	"Two Rebels"	—	Fashionably Late
2010	"Here Comes Trouble"	—	Fashionably Late
2011	"Hurricane"	—	A Tale of Risky Business: Part II
2012	"Serendipity"	—	Serendipity

=== Soundtracks ===
Year	Song	Album
2009	"Where Are You Now"	Bandslam
2009	"Magic"	Wizards of Waverly Place
2009	"White Christmas"	All Wrapped Up Vol.2
2009	"You Really Got Me"	Alvin and the Chipmunks: The Squeakquel: Original Motion Picture Soundtrack
2010	"Real Gone"	Disneymania 7
2010	"Can't Box Me In"	Team USA Olympics 2010 Soundtrack
