= Livvia =

American singer

LIVVIA
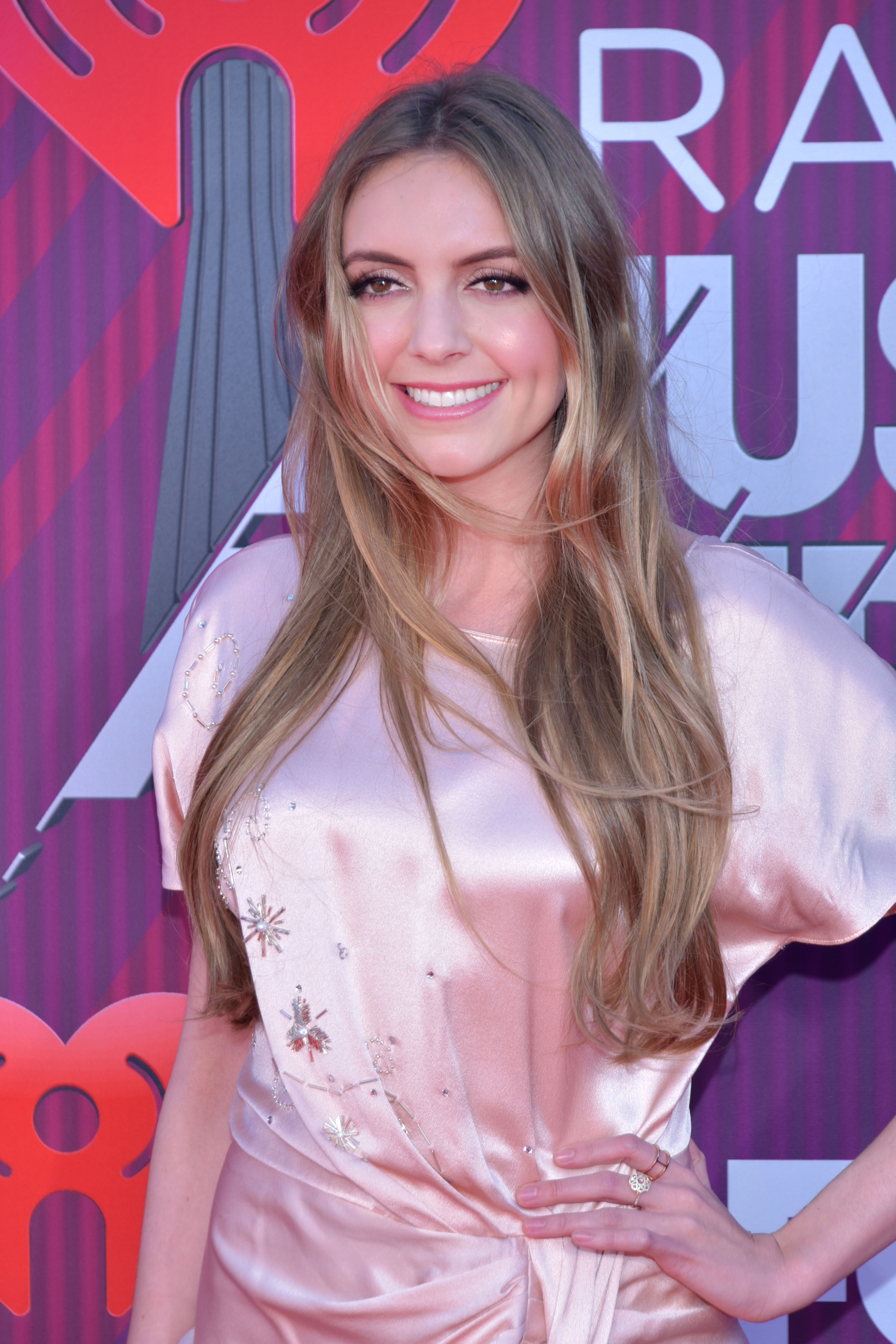
- LIVVIA at the 2019 iHeartRadio Music Awards in Los Angeles California

Background information
- Born: Olivia Somerlyn Hollins Christensen; June 4, 1994 (age 32); San Francisco, California, U.S.
- Genres: Pop, EDM
- Occupation: Musician
- Instruments: Voice, piano, keyboard, guitar
- Years active: 2010–present
- Website: livvia music

Olivia Somerlyn Hollins Christensen (born June 4, 1994) known professionally as LIVVIA (and previously known as Olivia Somerlyn), is an American pop singer-songwriter, best known for her singles "Parachute" (2014), "Catch a Body" featuring Quavo (2018), "Damn" (2018) and "Dizzy" (2019).

== Early life and education ==
Somerlyn was born and raised in San Francisco, California. She started writing songs when she was 13. While attending San Francisco University High school, she spent weekends in Los Angeles in an effort to work with writers and producers in the music industry. She resides in Los Angeles. She graduated from the University of California, Berkeley, in 2018, with a degree in economics. She will soon start at the top-rated MBA program in the world at the Stanford Graduate School of Business.

== Career ==
=== As Olivia Somerlyn (2010–17) ===
Somerlyn writes or co-writes all her own music and lyrics, and plays piano, keyboards and guitar. Her songs range from straightforward pop to danceable pop to piano ballads. Her self-titled debut EP was released in 2010. The music video for the single "I'm Just Fine" was featured on the homepages of MySpace and MySpace Music, AOL Music and JSYK.

In 2013, she released her third single, "Better With You". That year, the music video for "Before It Began" was voted the No. 1 video on Musiqtone's music video countdown, receiving over 2 million votes.

In 2014, she released the single "Parachute", which she co-wrote with Nick Jonas, who also produced the song. After debuting at number 45 in August 2014, the song reached number 1 on the Billboard Dance Club Songs chart in October 2014, with remixes from Jose Nunez, Steve Smart and Reid Stefan. The music video for the song premiered on Billboard's website on October 20, 2014. Somerlyn wanted to do some of her own stunts (though most stunts that appear in the music video were performed by the professional stuntwoman hired to double her for the production, Kelly Richardson). Olivia may have designed her own costume for the video, which was shot in the desert outside Los Angeles. Also in 2014, Somerlyn was selected as one of 25 participants in Macy's third annual iHeartRadio Rising Star Program, where singers compete for the opportunity to perform at the iHeartRadio Festival in Las Vegas in September 2015. She was voted into the top five, finishing as a finalist. Also in 2015, Somerlyn released "OXO", which was her second number one on the US dance chart.

Somerlyn is managed by Kevin Jonas, Sr., and she is signed with Creative Artists Agency.

In August 2016, Paul Gore, who directed the music video for the Katy Perry song "Rise", was accused of stealing the concept from the video for Somerlyn's song "Parachute", an allegation he denied.

=== Name change to LIVVIA (2018–present) ===
In 2018, Somerlyn adopted LIVVIA as her new stage name. Her first single under the new name was "Catch a Body" featuring Quavo from the rap group Migos, produced by Rock Mafia. It reached number 37 on the Billboard Mainstream Top 40, number 10 on Spotify's US Viral 50, and number 15 on the Global Viral 50. On June 8, 2018, her single "Gratitude" was released. On October 5, 2018, she released her third single as LIVVIA, "Damn". It went to number 31 on the Mainstream Top 40. Her single "Dizzy" was released on May 10, 2019.

== Performances ==
Somerlyn has toured the UK with Jessie J and Lawson, including two shows at The O2 Arena in London, and has also opened for the Jonas Brothers. She toured with Big Time Rush and Victoria Justice on Live Nation's 2013 Nickelodeon Summer Break Tour of over 30 cities in the United States. She then toured with Big Time Rush again in Central America and South America. In 2014, she was the featured performer at Sony Pictures Classics' annual Oscar Pre-Awards dinner party. She also performed at that year's New York Fashion Week, at shows for Charlotte Ronson and Isabella Rose Taylor. In 2015, she opened for Meghan Trainor in Glasgow, Manchester, London, Birmingham and also for the dates in Europe for Trainor's That Bass Tour. She also opened for Lindsey Stirling in the same year in the United States. In 2019 and 2020 she toured America and Europe with the Jonas Brothers.

== Honors ==
- TeenNick Top 10 Fresh Artist of the Month, May 2013
- Next Up Artist of the Week, KIIS-FM (Los Angeles, CA), April 2014
- Finalist, Macy's iHeartRadio Rising Star, 2014

== Discography ==
=== Extended plays ===
List of extended plays, with selected details
Title	Album details
Olivia Somerlyn	Released: December 21, 2010; Label: Olivia Somerlyn; Formats: Digital download

=== Singles ===
Year	Single	Peak positions			Album
Year	Single	US Dance	US Dance/Elec.	US Top 40	Album
2010	"I'm Just Fine"	—	—	—	Olivia Somerlyn
2010	"Not Your Girl"	—	—	—	Olivia Somerlyn
2010	"Only in the Movies"	—	—	—	Olivia Somerlyn
2013	"Better with You"	—	—	—	Non-album singles
2014	"Parachute"	1	—	—	Non-album singles
2015	"OXO"	1	—	—	Non-album singles
2016	"Only" (feat. tyDi)	6	35	—	Non-album singles
2018	"Catch a Body" (feat. Quavo)	—	—	37	Non-album singles
2018	"Gratitude"	—	—	—	Non-album singles
2018	"Damn"	—	—	31	Non-album singles
2019	"Dizzy"	—			Non-album singles
2020	"Say It"	—	—	—	
"—" denotes a recording that did not chart or was not released.
