= Fashionably Late (Honor Society album) =

Studio album by Honor Society
- Released: September 15, 2009
- Recorded: 2008–2009
- Studio: Wishbone (Los Angeles)
- Genre: Pop rock
- Length: 45:21
- Label: Jonas/Hollywood
- Producer: John Fields

Honor Society chronology
Fashionably Late (2009)	A Tale of Risky Business: Part II (2011)

Singles from Fashionably Late
- 1. "Over You" Released: September 15, 2009

Professional ratings
Review scores
Source	Rating
AllMusic	2/5 stars

Fashionably Late is the debut album by Honor Society and the first album to be released under Jonas Records through Hollywood Records. The album was released on September 15, 2009. "Over You" was the album's first single.

== Singles ==
- "Where Are You Now" was a single from Fashionably Late. It originally appeared on the soundtrack for the feature film Bandslam and was released as the soundtrack's first single on July 21, 2009.
- "Over You" is the first official single from this album released on September 15, 2009. The music video premiered on November 10, 2009.

== Chart performance ==
The album debuted on the Billboard 200 at number 18. It fell to number 183 the following week.

In its first week, the album sold a total of 22,000 units.

== Track listing ==
No.	Title	Writer(s)	Producer(s)	Length
1.	"Over You"	Nick Jonas; P.J. Bianco; Michael Bruno; Alexander Noyes; Jason Rosen; Andrew Lee	John Fields; Jonas Brothers	3:04
2.	"Full Moon Crazy"	Bruno; Noyes; Rosen; Lee; Greg Garbowsky	Fields	3:07
3.	"My Own Way"	N. Jonas; Bianco; Bruno; Noyes; Rosen; Lee	Fields; Jonas Brothers	3:38
4.	"Two Rebels"	Bruno; Noyes; Rosen; Lee	Fields	3:32
5.	"Why Didn't I"	Bruno; Rosen; Jay Levine	Fields	3:45
6.	"Goodnight My Love"	Bruno; Rosen; Levine	Fields	3:32
7.	"Here Comes Trouble"	Bruno; Noyes; Rosen; Lee; Jared Scharff; Ross Golan	Fields	3:17
8.	"See U in the Dark"	Bruno; Noyes; Rosen	Fields	3:07
9.	"Nobody Has to Know"	Bruno; Noyes; Rosen	Fields	2:53
10.	"Sing for You"	Bruno; Noyes; Rosen; Lee; N. Jonas; Joe Jonas	Fields	3:45
11.	"Rock with You"	N. Jonas; J. Jonas; Kevin Jonas; John Fields	Fields	3:44
12.	"Don't Close the Book"	Bruno; Noyes; Rosen; Lee	Fields	4:09
13.	"Where Are You Now"	Tom Higgenson	Fields	3:49
Total length:				45:21

== Personnel ==
Adapted from the Fashionably Late booklet.

Honor Society

- Michael Bruno – lead vocals, guitar
- Jason Rosen – keyboard, guitar, vocals
- Andrew Lee – bass, vocals
- Alexander Noyes – drums, vocals

Additional musicians

- John Fields – guitars, keyboards, bass, programming (all tracks)
- Ken Chastain – percussion (all tracks)
- Chris Theis – programming, engineer (5)
- Nick Jonas – vocals (3, 7, 8, 10, 12)
- Joe Jonas – vocals (8, 10, 12)
- Kevin Jonas – vocals (8, 12)
- Stephen Lu – string arrangements, conductor, keyboards (1, 3, 6, 12)
- Eric Gorfain – violin (1, 3, 6, 12)
- Daphne Chen – violin (1, 3, 6, 12)
- Wes Precourt – violin (1, 3, 6, 12)
- Radu Pieptea – violin (1, 3, 6, 12)
- Alma Fernandez – viola (1, 3, 6, 12)
- Jessica Van Velzen-Freer – viola (1, 3, 6, 12)
- Richard Dodd – cello (1, 3, 6, 12)
- Michael B. Nelson – horn arrangement, trombone (2)
- Steve Strand – lead trumpet (2)
- Dave Jensen – trumpet (2)
- Kenni Holmen – tenor sax (2)
- Kathy Jensen – baritone sax (2)
- Dorian Crozier – drums (11)
- Brian Gallagher – saxophone (11)

Production

- John Fields – producer, mixing
- Paul David Hager – mixing
- Dave McNair – mastering

Imagery

- David Snow – creative director
- Mark Albiani – photography
- Enny Joo – art direction of photography
- Gavin Taylor – packaging, art direction and design

== Charts ==
Chart performance
Chart (2009)	Peak position
Canadian Albums (Nielsen SoundScan)	47
US Billboard 200	18
