= Born to Live, Born to Love =

Born To Live, Born To Love

EP by Parade of Lights
- Released: September 30, 2012
- Recorded: 2011–2012
- Genres: Indie rock; electropop
- Length: 23:24
- Label: Self-released
- Producers: Ryan Daly, Anthony Improgo

Parade of Lights chronology
Born To Live, Born To Love (2012)	Golden (2014)

Born To Live, Born To Love is the debut extended play by Californian electronic rock outfit, Parade of Lights. It was self-released by the band on SoundCloud on September 30, 2012, and was re-released on Bandcamp on March 17, 2013.

== Track listing ==
No.	Title	Length
1.	"Just Give It Up"	2:41
2.	"Only Human"	3:48
3.	"Flash of Light"	3:06
4.	"Talk To You"	3:07
5.	"Wild"	4:34
6.	"Other Voices" (Bandcamp bonus track)	2:56
7.	"I'll Never Let You Go" (Bandcamp bonus track)	3:12
Total length:		23:24
