= Where Are You Now (Honor Society song) =

2009 single by Honor Society

- Cover art for the Bandslam soundtrack

Single by Honor Society

from the album Fashionably Late and Bandslam: Original Soundtrack
- Released: July 21, 2009 (soundtrack released)
- Genre: Pop rock; power pop
- Length: 3:49
- Label: Hollywood
- Songwriter: Tom Higgenson
- Producer: John Fields

Honor Society singles chronology
"Don't Close the Book" (2009)	"Where Are You Now" (2009)	"Over You" (2009)

Music video
- "Where Are You Now" on YouTube

"Where Are You Now" is a song by American pop rock band Honor Society from their debut album, Fashionably Late (2009), appearing as the last track from the album. Written by the Plain White T's vocalist Tom Higgenson, the song's music video premiered on August 27, 2009, and originally appeared on the soundtrack for the film Bandslam (2009).

The song is the band's most successful single and signature as a one-hit wonder, especially in the Philippines, and included chart MYX International Top 20. Also the song garnered almost 10 million streams on Spotify.

== Background ==
In an interview, guitarist Jason Rosen described "Where Are You Now" as a song that evokes the nostalgia of high school, capturing those unforgettable moments shared with friends and the later reflection on how those experiences shape who we become. The band recorded the song for the Bandslam soundtrack, which was released earlier that week. The recording was associated with a collaboration with Summit Entertainment as part of the soundtrack's production and release.

== Music video ==
The music video was released to Honor Society's channel on August 27, 2009. In the video features the band performing the song near a swimming pool. The music video has reached almost eight million views on YouTube. Another video was featured in the music-comedy, Bandslam, where it is used to various scenes from the movie.

== Track listing ==
1. "Where Are You Now" – 3:49
2. "Where Are You Now" (live) – 3:47

== Personnel ==
Credits are adapted from Apple Music.

- Honor Society – performer
- Tom Higgenson – songwriter
- John Fields – producer
- Paul David Hager – mixing

== Release history ==
Release history for "Where Are You Now"
Region	Date	Format	Label	Ref.
Various	January 1, 2009	Digital download; streaming	Hollywood	

== Cover versions ==
- Filipino vocal group the Company released a cover version of the song for their album LightHearted OPM 2.
- In 2010, Filipino singer Princess covered the song.
- In 2011, Filipino duo the Lamars covered the song for their EP titled Kung Puede Lang.
