= Parade of Lights =

American rock band

- Origin: Los Angeles, California
- Genres: Electronic rock, indie pop, alternative dance, nu gaze
- Years active: 2010–2018
- Members: Ryan Daly; Anthony Improgo; Randy Schulte; Michelle Ashley

Parade of Lights is an American electronic rock band from Los Angeles, California. It currently consists of lead vocalist and guitarist Ryan Daly, bassist Randy Schulte, keyboardist Michelle Ashley, and drummer Anthony Improgo.

== History ==
Shortly after meeting in 2006, Daly and Improgo formed the band Polus. After releasing a four-song EP entitled "Wish" and garnering a significant buzz in the L.A. area, Polus was put on hiatus due to considerable demand for both Daly and Improgo as touring musicians. Even with their rigorous touring schedules, the two managed to keep their friendship intact and exchanged song ideas via email until 2010 when they decided to officially reunite as Parade of Lights. They spent that year and 2011 releasing new music and playing shows in Southern California, Utah and Nevada, opening for artists like Imagine Dragons, Fitz And The Tantrums and 30 Seconds To Mars, among others.

In June 2013, the band released their single "We're the Kids", which quickly gained online recognition and was added to SiriusXM's Alt Nation channel, where it's spent four weeks on the Alt 18 Countdown charting as high as #14. The song was included in the 2014 EP Golden. The song charted as high as #41 in the Billboard Dance Club Songs chart.

Their 2014 EP Golden reached number 44 on the Billboard Top Heatseekers album chart.

"Feeling Electric" is featured on EA Sports game, FIFA 16, as its title song. The game was released worldwide on September 25, 2015.

In June 2017, the band released their single "Touch", before a second one, "Victorious", in September 2017.

In January 2018, they released a third new single, "Tidal Waves." These three singles plus new songs "Human Condition" and "Inside My Head" were included on the EP Human Condition - Pt. 1, released in May 2018.

In May 2018, the band were featured on the soundtrack to season two of 13 Reasons Why with the song "Tangled Up".

In August 2018, they released their new EP "Let's Be Friends" which has been included in their later album Human Condition Pt.II, that also contained another EP the band has released called "I Want It All" in September 2018, in which the song "I Want It All" is featured on EA Sports game, NHL 19.

== Discography ==
=== Studio albums ===
- Feeling Electric (2015)

=== EPs ===
- Born To Live, Born To Love (2012)
- Golden (2014)
- Human Condition - Pt. 1 (2018)
- Human Condition - Pt. 2 (2018)

=== Remixes ===
- "Golden" (Attom remix)
- We're The Kids Remixes (2014)

=== Singles ===
- "We're The Kids" (2013)
- "Golden" (2014)
- "Feeling Electric" (2015)
- "Touch" (2017)
- "Victorious" (2017)
- "Tidal Waves" (2018)
- "Let's Be Friends" (2018)
- "I Want It All" (2018)

== Members ==
- Ryan Daly - lead vocals, guitar
- Anthony Improgo - drums
- Randy Schulte - bass
- Michelle Ashleys - keyboards
