= Where Are You =

Where Are You may refer to:

== Albums ==
- Where Are You? (Frank Sinatra album), 1957
- Where Are You? (Mal Waldron album), 1989

== Songs ==
- "Where Are You?" (1937 song), written by Jimmy McHugh and Harold Adamson, covered by many performers
- "Where Are You" (Bee Gees song), 1966
- "Where Are You?" (Imaani song), 1998
- "Where Are You?", by 16 Bit, 1986
- "Where Are You (Cat Stevens song), 1967
- "Where Are You?", by Days of the New from Days of the New, 2001
- "Where Are You?", by Gotthard from Firebirth, 2012
- "Where Are You?", by Kavana from Kavana, 1997
- "Where Are You?", by Our Lady Peace from Healthy in Paranoid Times, 2005
- "Where Are You?", by Saves the Day from In Reverie, 2003
- "Where Are You (B.o.B vs. Bobby Ray)", by B.o.B from Strange Clouds, 2012

== Films ==
- Where Are You (film), a 2021 American drama film

== See also ==
- Where Are You Now (disambiguation)
- Kahan Ho Tum (disambiguation) (lit. 'Where Are You')
