= Red dress effect =

Psychological phenomenon

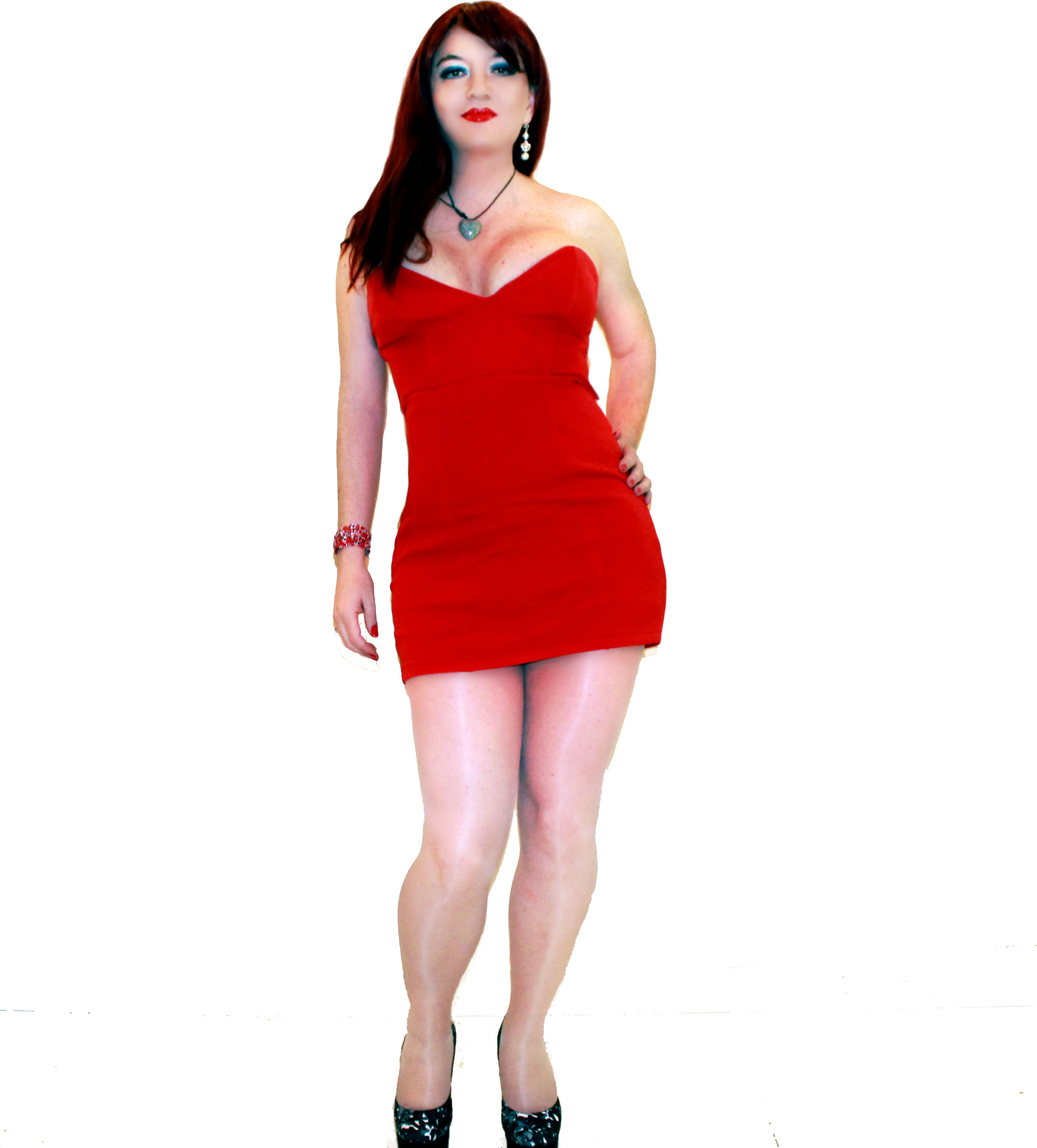
Red dress effect

The red dress effect, which can be broadened to the general red-attraction effect, the red-romance effect, or the romantic red effect, is a phenomenon in which the color red increases physical attraction, sexual desire, and romantic sentiments in comparison to other colors.

It has been asserted that this effect acts subconsciously because participants rarely report that they used color in their attractiveness judgments. In past decades, increased interest in color psychology has prompted multiple studies to investigate the red-attraction effect and the extent of this association. The scientific literature on the red-attraction effect is mixed, with sound evidence that both support and oppose the validity of the connection.

== Hypothesis ==
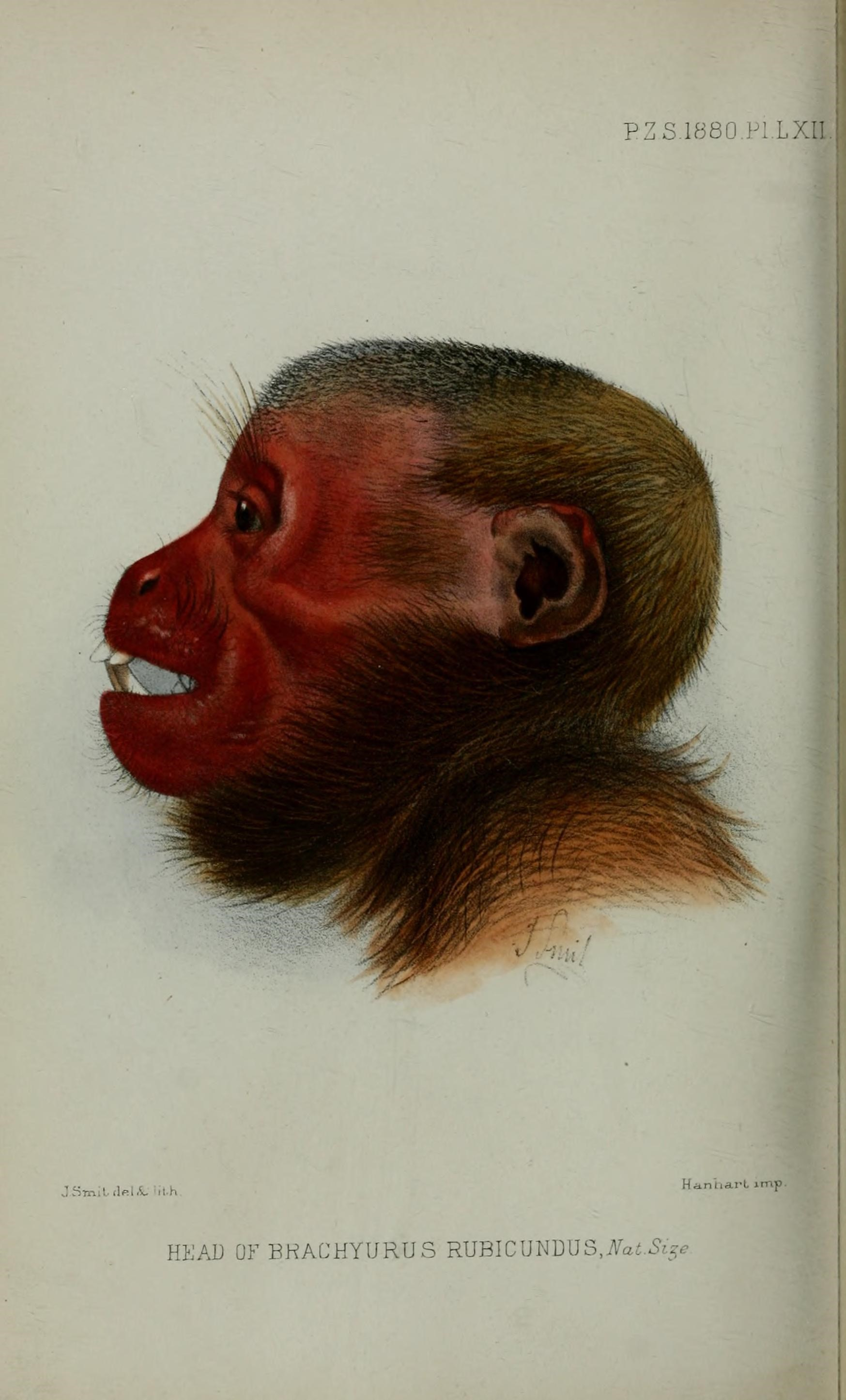
Red face uakari monkey.

=== Evolution ===
A plant's entomophilous flowers make a display when fertile to attract pollinating insects, bats, birds or other animals. In the wild, when many species of non-human primate females become fertile, their estrogen level rises, which causes their blood vessels to open up, leading to redness on the skin, especially near the face, chest and genitalia. The color display on some female primates is called sexual swelling. This increase in redness has been shown to attract male counterparts, expressed by their increased activity in sex, self-stimulation, and attention towards the females. Reddening of the skin is also associated with sexual attraction in humans. When people experience romantic affection or sexual attraction towards another, blushing of the neck, face, and chest are common. Red skin can also indicate peak fertile stages of the menstrual cycle, as estrogen levels increase in relation to progesterone levels and increase blood flow. Therefore, there are reasons to believe in the existence of evolutionary instincts that associate red with fertility, assuming the animal in question can perceive colour with its eyes.

Near hairless red face Japanese macaque.

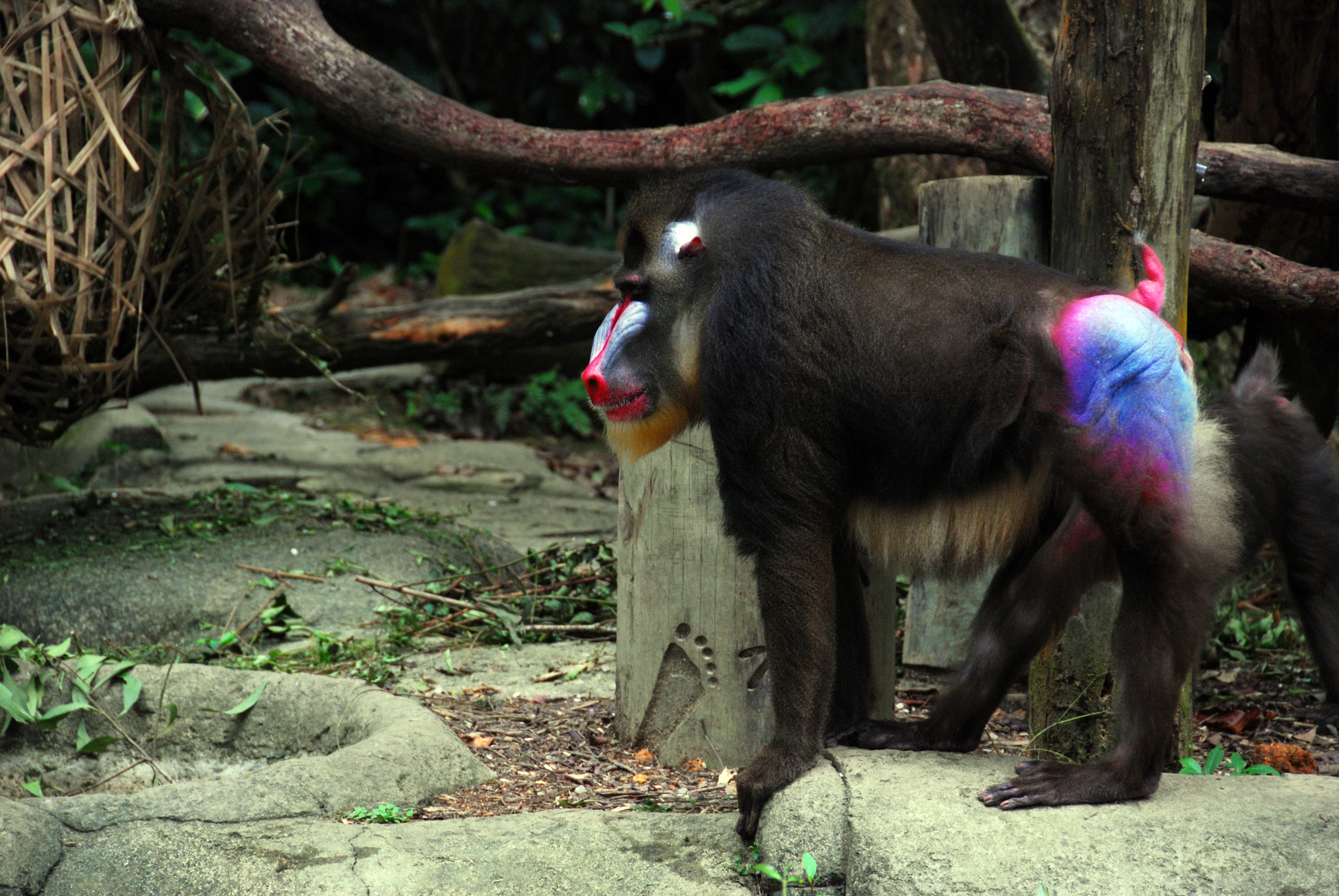
Colorful display on a male mandrill.

=== Social conditioning ===
The connection between the color red and sexual attraction may be a result of social conditioning. In ancient mythology and folklore, red is associated with fertility. Similarly, red was used as a symbol of fertility in the rituals of ancient civilizations. Women are thought to have worn the equivalent of a red lipstick as early as 10,000 B.C. As such, the link between sexual receptiveness and red may be a result of social conditioning; however, this social conditioning may have originated for biological and evolutionary reasons, and is simply an extension of our primal instincts.

== Evidence for and against the red-attraction effect ==
A large portion of the research into the red-attraction effect focuses on the impact on the visual presentation of the color red paired with the presentation of a person to whom participants indicate their attraction. In a study by Pazda it was shown that females wearing red are rated more attractive by males. They explained this by referring to the biological aspect that sexually receptive women are more attractive because of them having a higher probability for engaging in sexual activity, as well as a higher probability for the males to successfully reproduce. Elliot and Nesta from the University of Rochester found that men reported more romantic feelings towards women when the women were wearing red or presented on a red background.

The same effect seems to work for females rating males. In a disputed study by Elliot, it was shown that males wearing red are rated more attractive by females. In another experiment of Elliot's study, women rated men as more attractive and reported being more sexually attracted to them when their photos were presented against a red background than when their photos were presented on a gray background. In an attempt to quell doubts about this study overall, other researchers have attempted to replicate this specific experiment. Overall, the multiple replication studies countered the conclusions of the original study, showing that changing the color of the background had no significant effect on the perceived attraction

A large replication study by Peperkoorn et al. found no evidence for the red dress effect. Indeed, another large experiment found no evidence that red color cues are systematically associated with attractiveness ratings, casting doubt on the underlying mechanisms typically used to explain the red-attraction effect.

A study out of South Korea also supported the red-attraction link, as male participants rated a female model as more attractive when wearing a red shirt when compared to gray or blue shirts.

Some studies evaluated the red-romance link without investigating the role of red clothing. One study refuted the red-attraction link, showing that participants categorized red as being more related to anger-related words than to romance-related words, and that the romance-related words were categorized more with the color pink. Another study examined the effect of the word "red" when verbally spoken, and found that when men were described as wearing red shirts they were rated as more attractive when compared to men described as wearing gray shirts, and when compared to men wearing green shirts. Therefore, this study also supported the red-attraction effect.

One study specifically evaluated the use of red clothing as a signal of sexual attraction, and found that women chose to wear a red shirt rather than a green shirt more often when they were told that they would be conversing with an attractive man than when they were told they were meeting with an unattractive man.

Research conducted in Germany seems to extend the red-attraction effect to self-attraction. Participants wore either a red or blue shirt, and were then directed to rate their own attractiveness. Both males and females that wore red shirts rated themselves as more attractive, even when accounting for factors that typically influence self-attraction like BMI or mood. Red may be influential by increasing one's own perceived attractiveness, which in turn boosts self-confidence, and increased confidence is generally associated with higher levels of attraction from others.

== Possible explanations ==
There seem to be multiple factors that influence the strength or presence of the red-attraction effect, which may account for the unclear evidence about the effect overall.

One possible explanation, that the red-attraction effect is ingrained and independent from societal influence, is supported by a study conducted in isolated rural communities of Burkina Faso. When males were asked to indicate the attraction of women photographed against red and blue backgrounds, those in the red condition rated the women as more attractive. Therefore, this study supports the universality of the red-attraction effect. However, they did not report a stronger sexual desire towards the women, which led to the conclusion that the red-attraction effect may be constrained by culturally appropriate expressions of attraction. This may explain why some studies have not supported the red-attraction effect.

Another study examined the role of sexual dimorphism as a possible moderator. Sexual dimorphism, morphological differences between the sexes of a species, are the differences between masculine and feminine facial features in this context. The study, conducted in China, found that the red-attraction effect only held true when males were rating faces with highly feminine cues. Feminine cues were determined by averaging several female faces together, and averaging several male faces together and isolating the differences. When males rated faces with more masculinity cues, the color red seemed to have no impact on perceived attraction. Sexual dimorphism could be a possible explanation for variying results in studies of the red-attraction effect.

However, there may also be reason to conclude that the red-romance effect could be due to the awareness of the proposed connection between the color red and the object or person that is being rated. One study concludes that the typical red-attraction link only occurs when an explicit pairing of the color red and the target occurs, rather than an implicit or unconscious cue. As such, high awareness of the color-target pair is a necessary constraint of the red-attraction effect.

The red-attraction effect is strongly limited by a baseline or prior level of attraction. The red-attraction effect only held true when males rated females that they initially rated as attractive. In females rated as unattractive, the presentation of the color red did not increase perceived attraction.

== Conclusion ==
Further research on the red-attraction effect could improve on the methods used to evaluate this effect, as the quality of studies on the red-attraction effect is not favorable. The majority of existing research fails to consider color production and color presentation, and future research could also take into account sample size and the complexity of color psychology. Additionally, the conclusions for male participants are clearer than those for female participants. Studies of higher quality could yield a clearer conclusion about the true effect, if any, of red on attraction.

== See also ==
- Color psychology
- Lipstick
- Peafowl
- Ribbon-tailed astrapia
- Female cosmetic coalitions
